= Charles Dickens =

English writer and journalist (1812–1870)

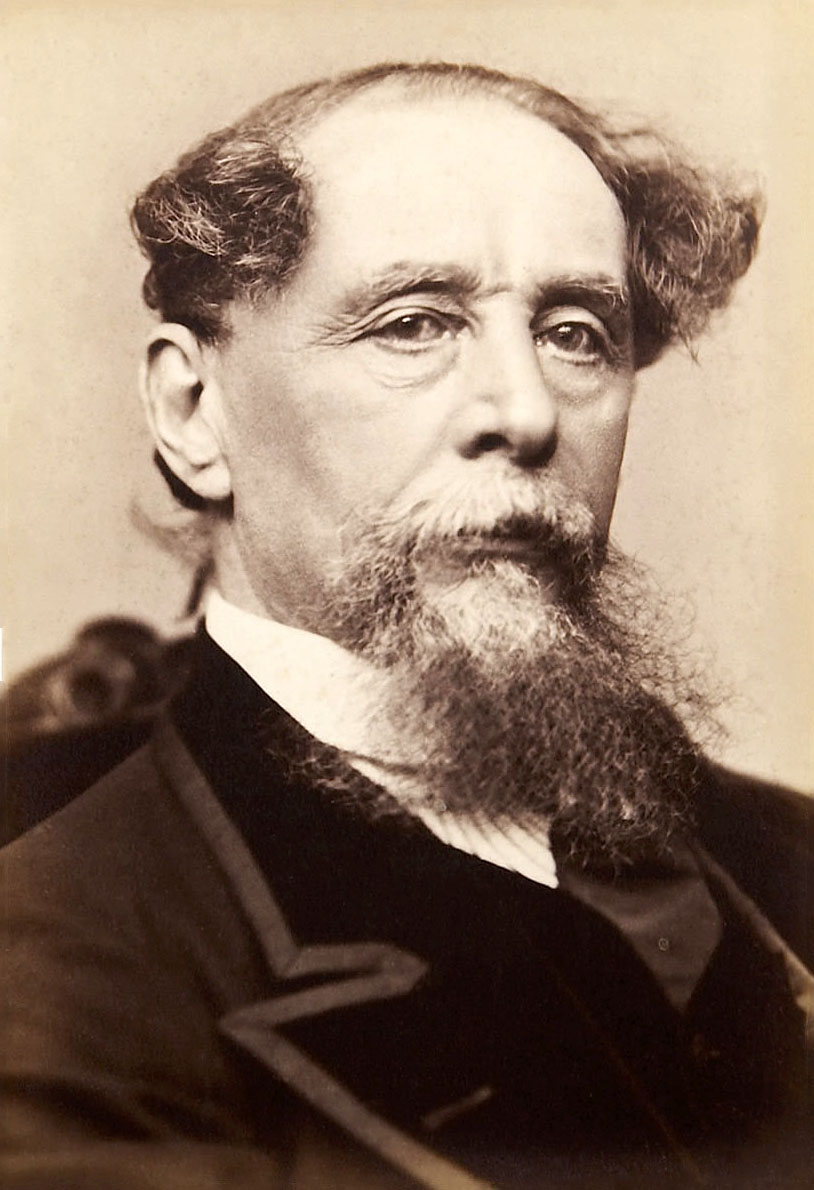
- Portrait by Jeremiah Gurney, c. 1867–1868
- Born: Charles John Huffam Dickens; 7 February 1812; Portsmouth, Hampshire, England
- Died: 9 June 1870 (aged 58); Higham, Kent, England
- Resting place: Poets' Corner, Westminster Abbey, England; 51°29′57″N 0°7′39″W
- Occupation: Novelist
- Spouse: Catherine Thomson Hogarth (m. 1836; sep. 1858)
- Partner: Ellen Ternan (1857–1870, his death)
- Children: Charles Dickens Jr.; Mary Dickens; Kate Perugini; Walter Landor Dickens; Francis Dickens; Alfred D'Orsay Tennyson Dickens; Sydney Smith Haldimand Dickens; Henry Fielding Dickens; Dora Annie Dickens; Edward Dickens
- Writing career
- Notable works: The Pickwick Papers; Oliver Twist; Nicholas Nickleby; The Old Curiosity Shop; A Christmas Carol; David Copperfield; Bleak House; Little Dorrit; A Tale of Two Cities; Great Expectations
- Works related to Charles Dickens at Wikisource

Charles John Huffam Dickens (/ˈdɪkɪnz/; 7 February 1812 – 9 June 1870) was an English writer and journalist. He created some of literature's best-known fictional characters, and is regarded by many as the greatest novelist of the Victorian era. His works enjoyed unprecedented popularity during his lifetime and, by the 20th century, critics and scholars had recognised him as a literary genius. His novels and short stories are widely read today.

Born in Portsmouth, Dickens left school at age 12 to work in a boot-blacking factory when his father John was incarcerated in a debtors' prison. After three years, he returned to school before beginning his literary career as a journalist. Dickens edited a weekly journal for 20 years; wrote 15 novels, 5 novellas, hundreds of short stories and nonfiction articles; lectured and performed readings extensively; was a tireless letter writer; and campaigned vigorously for children's rights, education and other social reforms.

Dickens's literary success began with the 1836 serial publication of The Pickwick Papers, a publishing phenomenon—thanks largely to the introduction of the character Sam Weller in the fourth episode—that sparked Pickwick merchandise and spin-offs. Within a few years, Dickens had become an international literary celebrity, famous for his humour, satire and keen observation of character and society. His novels, most of them published in monthly or weekly instalments, pioneered the serial publication of narrative fiction, which became the dominant Victorian mode for novel publication. Cliffhanger endings in his serial publications kept readers in suspense. The installment format allowed Dickens to evaluate his audience's reaction, and he often modified his plot and character development based on such feedback. For example, when his wife's podiatrist expressed distress at the way Miss Mowcher in David Copperfield seemed to reflect her own disabilities, Dickens improved the character with positive features. His plots were carefully constructed and he often wove elements from topical events into his narratives. Masses of the illiterate poor would individually pay a halfpenny to have each new monthly episode read to them, opening up and inspiring a new class of readers.

His 1843 novella A Christmas Carol remains especially popular and continues to inspire adaptations in every creative medium. Oliver Twist and Great Expectations are also frequently adapted and, like many of his novels, evoke images of early Victorian London. His 1853 novel Bleak House, a satire on the judicial system, helped support a reformist movement that culminated in the 1870s legal reform in England. A Tale of Two Cities (1859; set in London and Paris) is regarded as his best-known work of historical fiction. The most famous celebrity of his era, he undertook, in response to public demand, a series of public reading tours in the later part of his career. The term Dickensian is used to describe something that is reminiscent of Dickens and his writings, such as poor social or working conditions, or comically repulsive characters.

== Early life ==
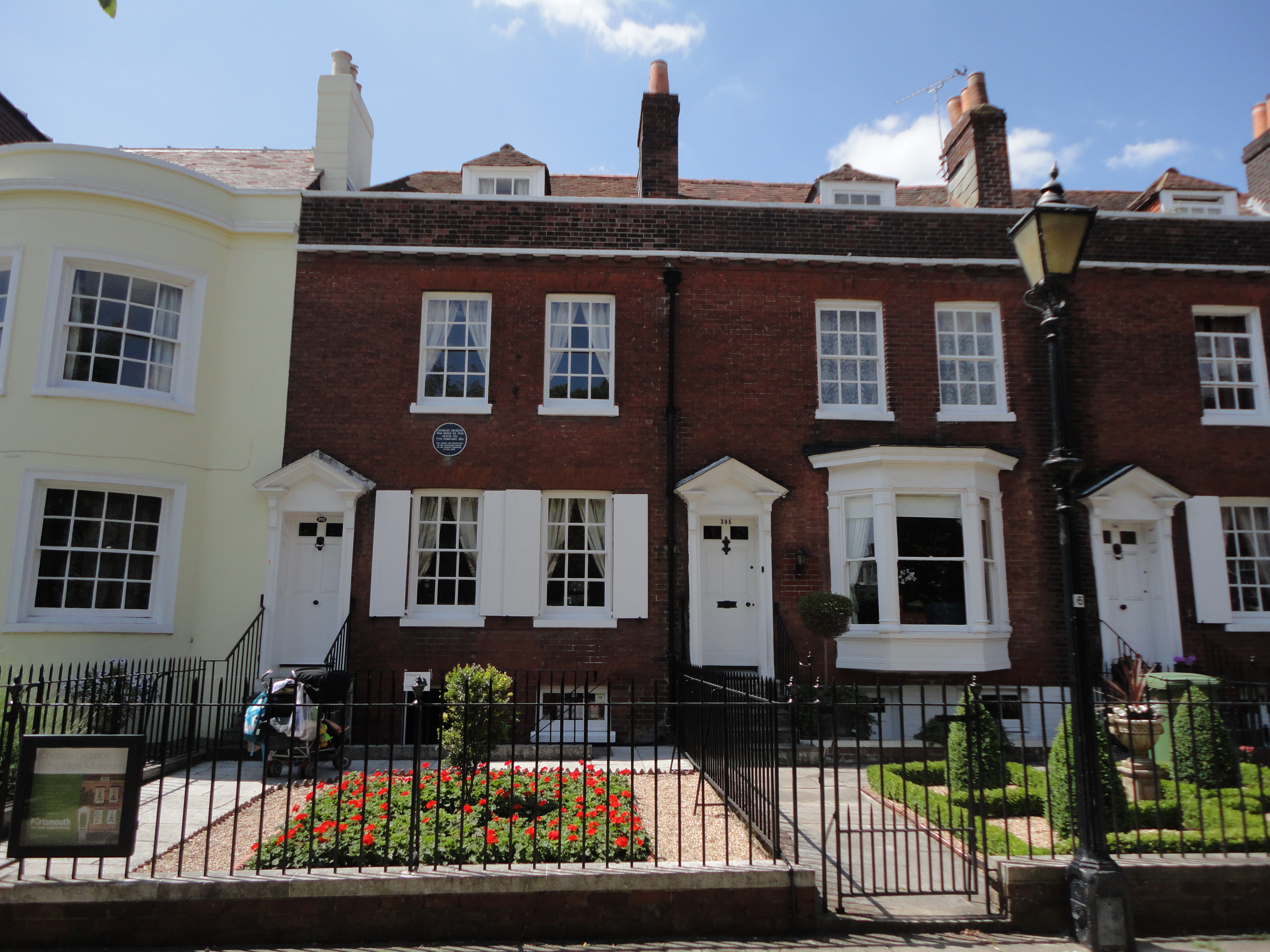
Charles Dickens's birthplace, 393 Commercial Road, Portsmouth, Hampshire

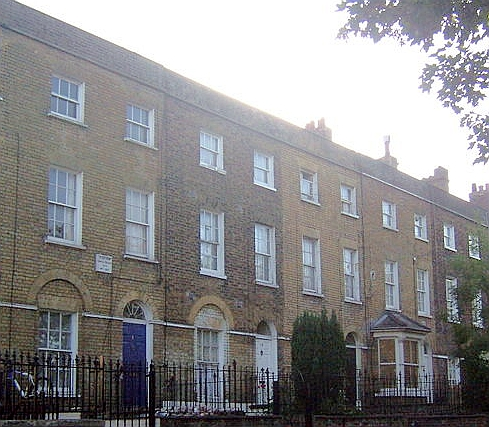
2 Ordnance Terrace (house on the left), Chatham, Kent, Dickens's home from 1817 to 1821

Charles John Huffam Dickens was born on 7 February 1812 at 1 Mile End Terrace (now 393 Commercial Road), Landport in Portsea Island (Portsmouth), Hampshire, the second of eight children of Elizabeth Dickens (née Barrow; 1789–1863) and John Dickens (1785–1851). His father was a clerk in the Royal Navy Pay Office and was temporarily stationed in the district. He asked Christopher Huffam, rigger in the Royal Navy and head of an established firm, to act as godfather to Charles. Huffam is thought to be the inspiration for Paul Dombey, the owner of a shipping company in Dickens's novel Dombey and Son (1848).

In January 1815 John Dickens was called back to London, and the family moved to Norfolk Street, Fitzrovia. When Charles was four they relocated to Sheerness and thence to Chatham, Kent, where he spent his formative years until the age of 11. His early life seems to have been idyllic, though he thought himself a "very small and not-over-particularly-taken-care-of boy".

Charles spent time outdoors, but also read voraciously, including the picaresque novels of Tobias Smollett and Henry Fielding, as well as Robinson Crusoe and Gil Blas. He read and re-read The Arabian Nights and the Collected Farces of Elizabeth Inchbald. Aged seven, he first saw Joseph Grimaldi—the father of modern clowning—perform at the Star Theatre in Rochester, Kent. He later imitated Grimaldi's clowning on several occasions, and would also edit the Memoirs of Joseph Grimaldi. (Note: John Forster quotes an unpublished letter in which Dickens responds to the accusation that he must not have seen Grimaldi in person: "Now, Sir, although I was brought up from remote country parts in the dark ages of 1819 and 1820 to behold the splendour of Christmas pantomimes and the humour of Joe, in whose honour I am informed I clapped my hands with great precocity, and although I even saw him act in the remote times of 1823 ... I am willing ... to concede that I had not arrived at man's estate when Grimaldi left the stage". When Dickens arrived in America for the first time in 1842, he stayed at the Tremont House, America's "pioneer first-class hotel". Dickens "bounded into the Tremont's foyer shouting out 'Here we are!', Grimaldi's famous catch-phrase and as such entirely appropriate for a great and cherished entertainer making his entrance upon a new stage." Later, Dickens was known to imitate Grimaldi's clowning on several occasions.) He retained poignant memories of childhood, helped by an excellent memory of people and events, which he used in his writing. His father's brief work as a clerk in the Navy Pay Office afforded him a few years of private education, first at a dame school and then at a school run by William Giles, a dissenter, in Chatham.

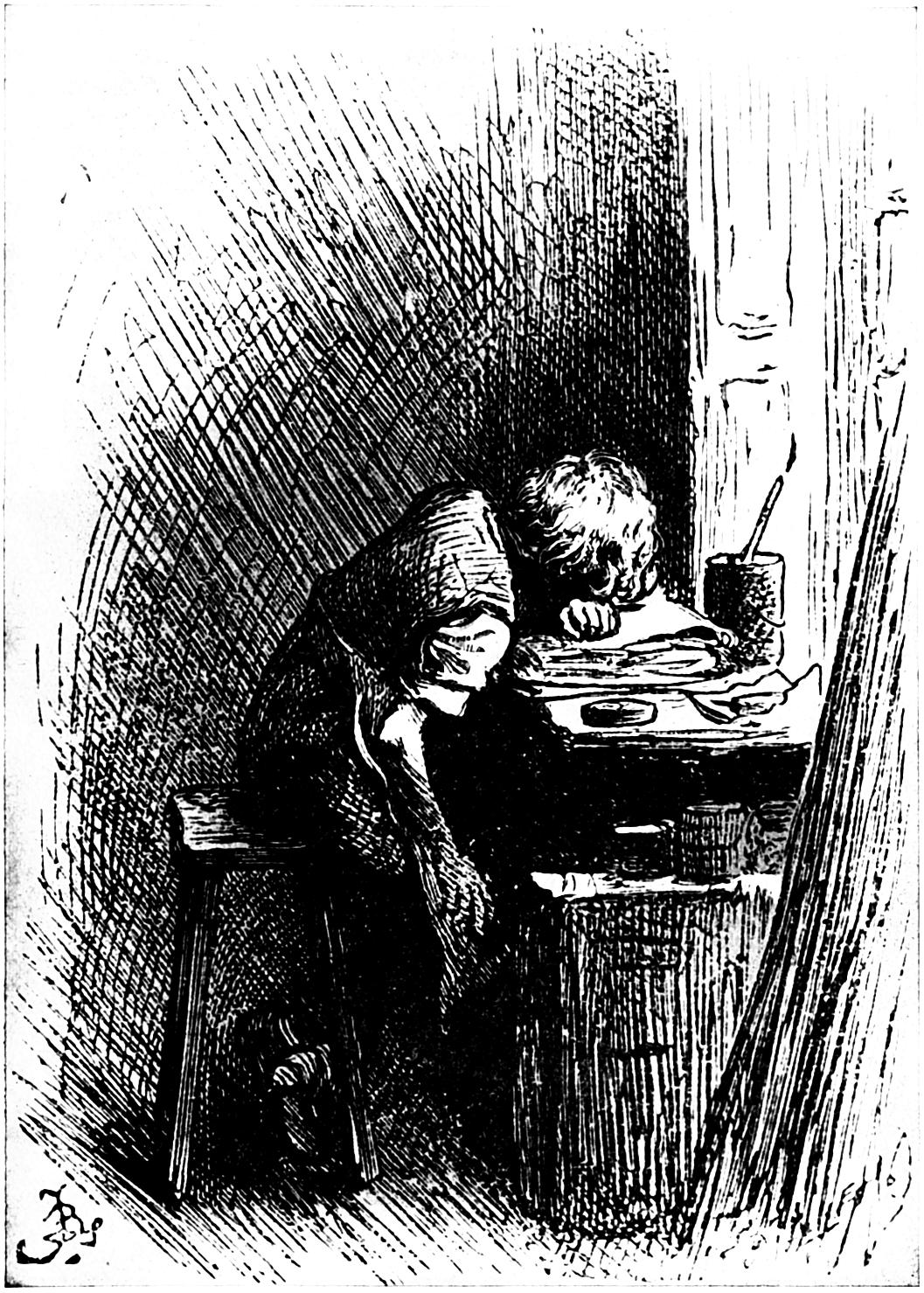
An illustration by Fred Bernard of Dickens at work in a shoe-blacking factory after his father had been sent to the Marshalsea, published in the 1892 edition of Forster's Life of Charles Dickens

This period came to an end in June 1822, when John Dickens was recalled to Navy Pay Office headquarters at Somerset House and the family (except for Charles, who stayed behind to finish his final term at school) moved to Camden Town in London. The family had left Kent amidst rapidly mounting debts and, living beyond his means, John Dickens was forced by his creditors into the Marshalsea debtors' prison in Southwark, London, in 1824. His wife and youngest children joined him there, as was the practice at the time. Charles, then 12 years old, boarded with Elizabeth Roylance, a family friend, at 112 College Place, Camden Town. Mrs Roylance was "a reduced impoverished old lady, long known to our family", whom Dickens later immortalised, "with a few alterations and embellishments", as "Mrs Pipchin" in Dombey and Son. Later, he lived in a back-attic in the house of an agent for the Insolvent Court, Archibald Russell, "a fat, good-natured, kind old gentleman ... with a quiet old wife" and lame son, in Lant Street in Southwark. They provided the inspiration for the Garlands in The Old Curiosity Shop.

On Sundays—with his sister Frances, free from her studies at the Royal Academy of Music—he spent the day at the Marshalsea. Dickens later used the prison as a setting in Little Dorrit. To pay for his board and to help his family, Dickens was forced to leave school and work ten-hour days at Warren's Blacking Warehouse, on Hungerford Stairs, near the present Charing Cross railway station, where he earned six shillings a week pasting labels on pots of boot blacking. The strenuous and often harsh working conditions made a lasting impression on Dickens and later influenced his fiction and essays, becoming the foundation of his interest in the reform of socio-economic and labour conditions, the rigours of which he believed were unfairly borne by the poor. He later wrote that he wondered "how I could have been so easily cast away at such an age". As he recalled to John Forster (from Life of Charles Dickens):

The blacking-warehouse was the last house on the left-hand side of the way, at old Hungerford Stairs. It was a crazy, tumble-down old house, abutting of course on the river, and literally overrun with rats. Its wainscoted rooms, and its rotten floors and staircase, and the old grey rats swarming down in the cellars, and the sound of their squeaking and scuffling coming up the stairs at all times, and the dirt and decay of the place, rise up visibly before me, as if I were there again. The counting-house was on the first floor, looking over the coal-barges and the river. There was a recess in it, in which I was to sit and work. My work was to cover the pots of paste-blacking; first with a piece of oil-paper, and then with a piece of blue paper; to tie them round with a string; and then to clip the paper close and neat, all round, until it looked as smart as a pot of ointment from an apothecary's shop. When a certain number of grosses of pots had attained this pitch of perfection, I was to paste on each a printed label, and then go on again with more pots. Two or three other boys were kept at similar duty down-stairs on similar wages. One of them came up, in a ragged apron and a paper cap, on the first Monday morning, to show me the trick of using the string and tying the knot. His name was Bob Fagin; and I took the liberty of using his name, long afterwards, in Oliver Twist.

When the warehouse was moved to Chandos Street in the smart, busy district of Covent Garden, the boys worked in a room in which the window gave onto the street. Small audiences gathered and watched them at work—in Dickens's biographer Simon Callow's estimation, the public display was "a new refinement added to his misery".

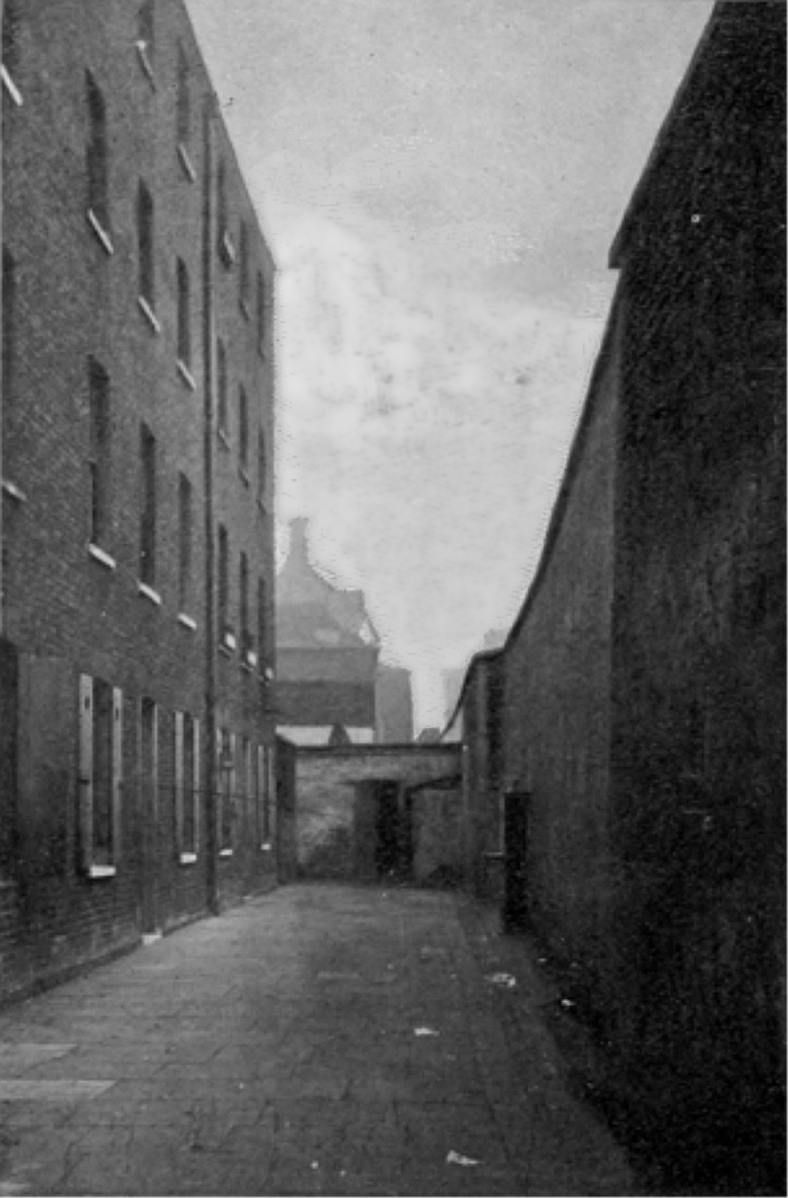
The Marshalsea around 1897, after it had closed. Dickens based several of his characters on the experience of seeing his father in the debtors' prison, most notably Amy Dorrit from Little Dorrit.

A few months after his imprisonment, John Dickens's mother, Elizabeth Dickens, died and bequeathed him £450. On the expectation of this legacy, Dickens was released from prison. Under the Insolvent Debtors Act, Dickens arranged for payment of his creditors, and he and his family left the Marshalsea, for the home of Mrs Roylance.

Charles's mother, Elizabeth Dickens, did not immediately support his removal from the boot-blacking warehouse. This influenced Dickens's view that a father should rule the family and a mother find her proper sphere inside the home: "I never afterwards forgot, I never shall forget, I never can forget, that my mother was warm for my being sent back." His mother's failure to request his return was a factor in his dissatisfied attitude towards women.

Righteous indignation stemming from his own situation and the conditions under which working-class people lived became major themes of his works, and it was this unhappy period in his youth to which he alluded in his favourite and most autobiographical novel, David Copperfield: "I had no advice, no counsel, no encouragement, no consolation, no assistance, no support, of any kind, from anyone, that I can call to mind, as I hope to go to heaven!"

Dickens was eventually sent to the Wellington House Academy in Camden Town, where he remained until March 1827, having spent about two years there. He did not consider it to be a good school: "Much of the haphazard, desultory teaching, poor discipline punctuated by the headmaster's sadistic brutality, the seedy ushers and general run-down atmosphere, are embodied in Mr Creakle's Establishment in David Copperfield."

Dickens worked at the law office of Ellis and Blackmore, attorneys, of Holborn Court, Gray's Inn, as a junior clerk from May 1827 to November 1828. He was a gifted mimic and impersonated those around him: clients, lawyers and clerks. Captivated with London's theatre scene, he went to theatres obsessively: he claimed that for at least three years he went to the theatre every day. His favourite actor was Charles Mathews and Dickens learnt his "monopolylogues" (farces in which Mathews played every character) by heart. Then, having learned Thomas Gurney's system of shorthand in his spare time, he left to become a freelance reporter. A distant relative, Thomas Charlton, was a freelance reporter at Doctors' Commons and Dickens was able to share his box there to report the legal proceedings for nearly four years.

In 1830 Dickens met his first love, Maria Beadnell, thought to have been the model for the character Dora in David Copperfield. Maria's parents disapproved of the courtship and ended the relationship by sending her to school in Paris.

== Career ==
=== Journalism and writing ===
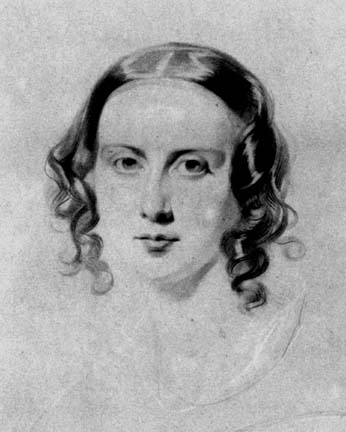
Portrait of Catherine Hogarth Dickens by Samuel Laurence, 1838. She met the author in 1834, and they became engaged the following year before marrying in April 1836.

In 1832, at the age of 20, Dickens was energetic and increasingly self-confident. He enjoyed mimicry and popular entertainment, lacked a sense of what he wanted to become, and yet knew he wanted fame. Drawn to the theatre—he became an early member of the Garrick Club—he landed an acting audition at Covent Garden, where the manager George Bartley and the actor Charles Kemble were to see him. Dickens prepared meticulously and decided to imitate the comedian Charles Mathews, but ultimately he missed the audition because of a cold. Before another opportunity arose, he had set out on his career as a writer.

In 1833 Dickens submitted his first story, "A Dinner at Poplar Walk", to the London periodical Monthly Magazine. His uncle William Barrow offered him a job on The Mirror of Parliament and he worked in the House of Commons for the first time early in 1832. He rented rooms at 15 Buckingham Street and later at Furnival's Inn and worked as a political journalist, reporting on Parliamentary debates, and he travelled across Britain to cover election campaigns for the Morning Chronicle.

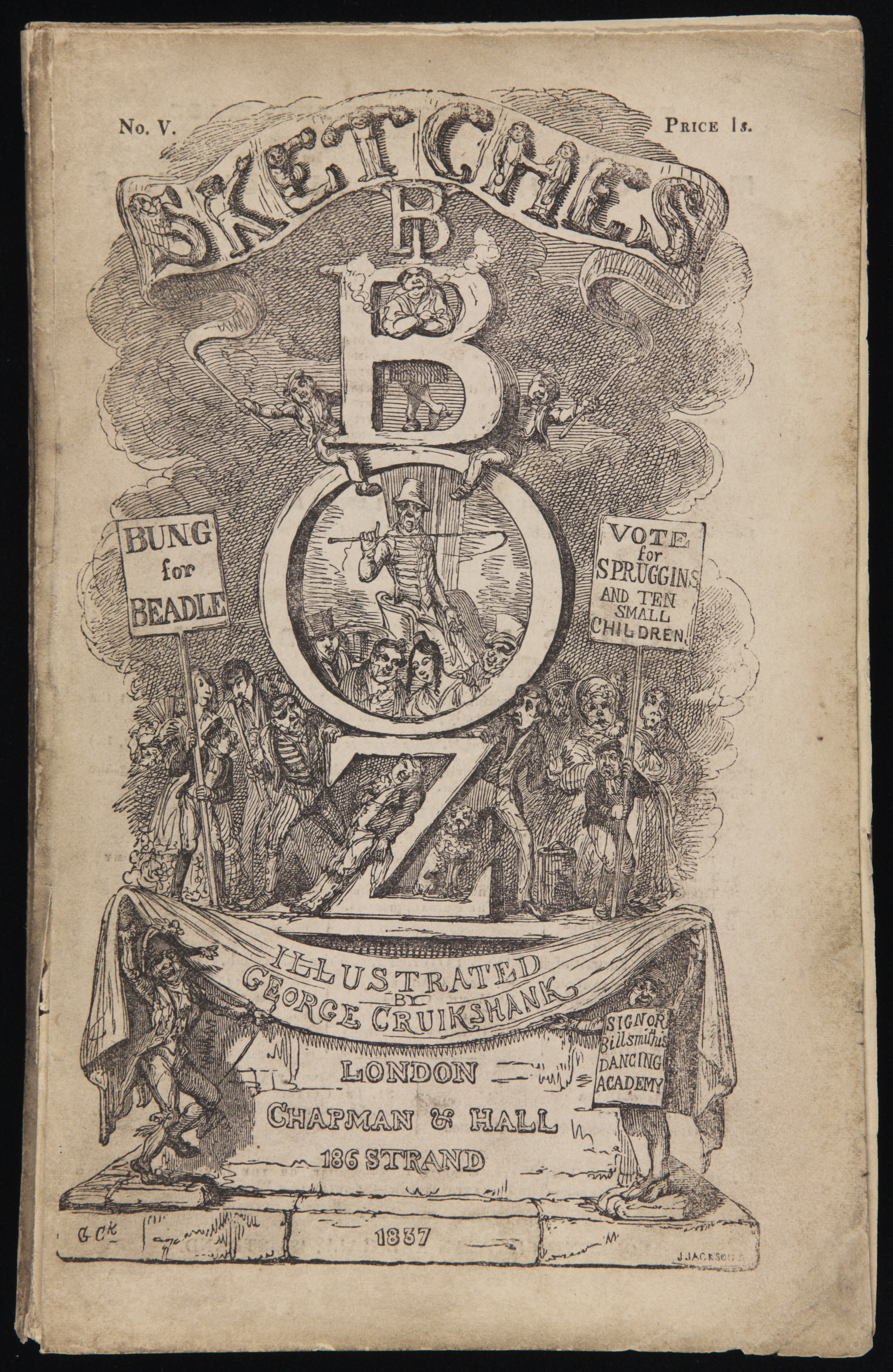
Frontispiece, Sketches by Boz—Boz being a family nickname—written by Dickens with illustrations by George Cruikshank, 1837

His journalism, in the form of sketches in periodicals, formed his first collection of pieces, published in 1836: Sketches by Boz—Boz being a family nickname he employed as a pseudonym for some years. Dickens apparently adopted it from the nickname 'Moses', which he had given to his youngest brother Augustus Dickens, after a character in Oliver Goldsmith's The Vicar of Wakefield. When pronounced by anyone with a head cold, "Moses" became "Boses"—later shortened to Boz.

Dickens's name was considered "queer" by a contemporary critic, who wrote in 1849: "Mr Dickens, as if in revenge for his own queer name, does bestow still queerer ones upon his fictitious creations". Dickens contributed to and edited journals throughout his literary career. In January 1835, the Morning Chronicle launched an evening edition, under the editorship of the Chronicle's music critic, George Hogarth. Hogarth invited him to contribute Street Sketches and Dickens became a regular visitor to his Fulham house—excited by Hogarth's friendship with Walter Scott (whom Dickens greatly admired) and enjoying the company of Hogarth's three daughters, Georgina, Mary and 19-year-old Catherine.

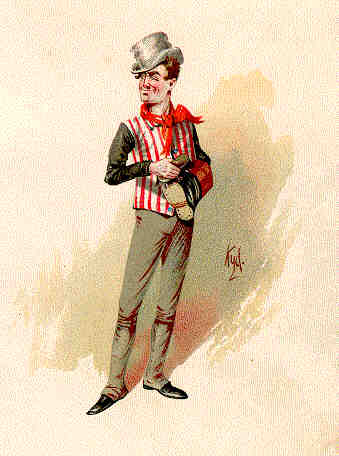
The humorous, warm-hearted servant Sam Weller from The Pickwick Papers—a publishing phenomenon that sparked numerous spin-offs and Pickwick merchandise—made the 24-year-old Dickens famous.

Dickens made rapid progress professionally and socially. He began a friendship with William Harrison Ainsworth, the author of the highwayman novel Rookwood (1834), whose bachelor salon in Harrow Road had become the meeting place for a set that included Daniel Maclise, Benjamin Disraeli, Edward Bulwer-Lytton and George Cruikshank. All these became his friends and collaborators, with the exception of Disraeli, and he met his first publisher, John Macrone, at the house.

The success of Sketches by Boz led to a proposal from publishers Chapman and Hall for Dickens to supply text to match Robert Seymour's engraved illustrations in a monthly letterpress. Seymour committed suicide after the second instalment and Dickens, who wanted to write a connected series of sketches, hired "Phiz" to provide the engravings (which were reduced from four to two per instalment) for the story. The resulting story became The Pickwick Papers and, although the first few episodes were not successful, the introduction of the Cockney character Sam Weller in the fourth episode (the first to be illustrated by Phiz) marked a sharp climb in its popularity. The final instalment sold 40,000 copies. On the impact of the character, The Paris Review stated in 2015, "arguably the most historic bump in English publishing is the Sam Weller Bump." A publishing phenomenon, John Sutherland, Professor of Modern English Literature at University College London, called The Pickwick Papers "[t]he most important single novel of the Victorian era". The unprecedented success led to numerous spin-offs and merchandise including Pickwick cigars, playing cards, china figurines, Sam Weller puzzles, Weller boot polish and joke books. Pickwick launched Dickens's career, and Nina Martyris in The Paris Review wrote:

The Sam Weller Bump testifies not merely to Dickens's comic genius but to his acumen as an "authorpreneur", a portmanteau he inhabited long before The Economist took it up. For a writer who made his reputation crusading against the squalor of the Industrial Revolution, Dickens was a creature of capitalism; he used everything from the powerful new printing presses to the enhanced advertising revenues to the expansion of railroads to sell more books. Dickens ensured that his books were available in cheap bindings for the lower orders as well as in morocco-and-gilt for people of quality; his ideal readership included everyone from the pickpockets who read Oliver Twist to Queen Victoria, who found it "exceedingly interesting".

On its impact on mass culture, Nicholas Dames in The Atlantic writes, "'Literature' is not a big enough category for Pickwick. It defined its own, a new one that we have learned to call 'entertainment'." In November 1836 Dickens accepted the position of editor of Bentley's Miscellany, a position he held for three years, until he fell out with the owner. In 1836, as he finished the last instalments of The Pickwick Papers, he began writing the beginning instalments of Oliver Twist—writing as many as 90 pages a month—while continuing work on Bentley's and also writing four plays, the production of which he oversaw. Oliver Twist, published in 1838, became one of Dickens's better known stories and was the first Victorian novel with a child protagonist.

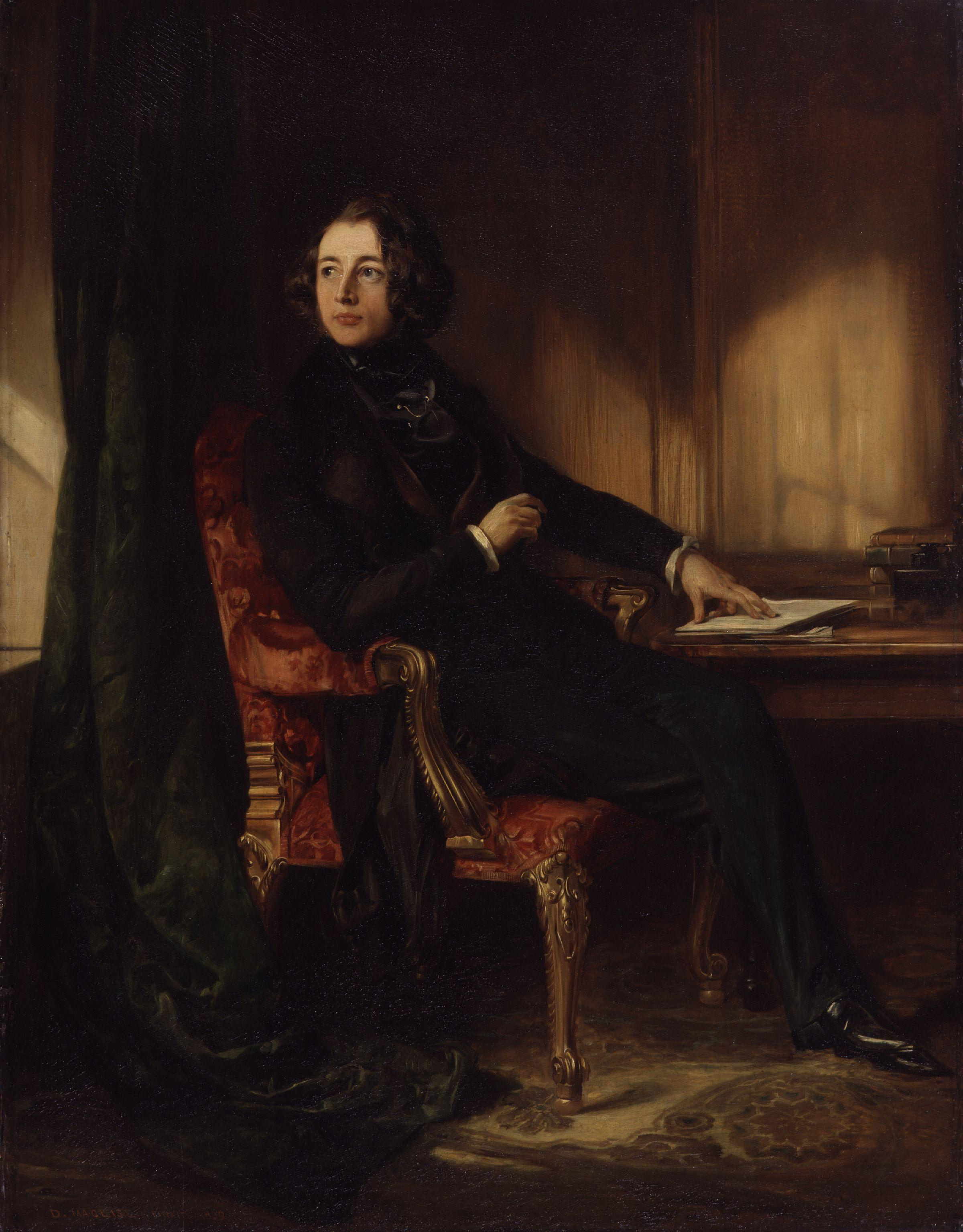
Portrait of Charles Dickens by Daniel Maclise, 1839

On 2 April 1836, after a one-year engagement, and between episodes two and three of The Pickwick Papers, Dickens married Catherine Thomson Hogarth (1815–1879), the daughter of George Hogarth, editor of the Evening Chronicle. They were married in St Luke's Church, Chelsea, London. After a brief honeymoon in Chalk in Kent, the couple returned to lodgings at Furnival's Inn. The first of their ten children, Charles, was born in January 1837 and a few months later the family set up home in Bloomsbury at 48 Doughty Street, London (on which Charles had a three-year lease at £80 a year) from 25 March 1837 until December 1839. Dickens's younger brother Frederick and Catherine's 17-year-old sister Mary Hogarth moved in with them. Dickens became very attached to Mary, and she died in his arms after a brief illness in 1837. Unusually for Dickens, as a consequence of his shock, he stopped working, and he and Catherine stayed at a little farm on Hampstead Heath for a fortnight. Dickens idealised Mary; the character he fashioned after her, Rose Maylie, he found he could not now kill, as he had planned, in his fiction, and, according to Ackroyd, he drew on memories of her for his later descriptions of Little Nell and Florence Dombey. His grief was so great that he was unable to meet the deadline for the June instalment of The Pickwick Papers and had to cancel the Oliver Twist instalment that month as well. The time in Hampstead was the occasion for a growing bond between Dickens and John Forster to develop; Forster soon became his unofficial business manager and the first to read his work.

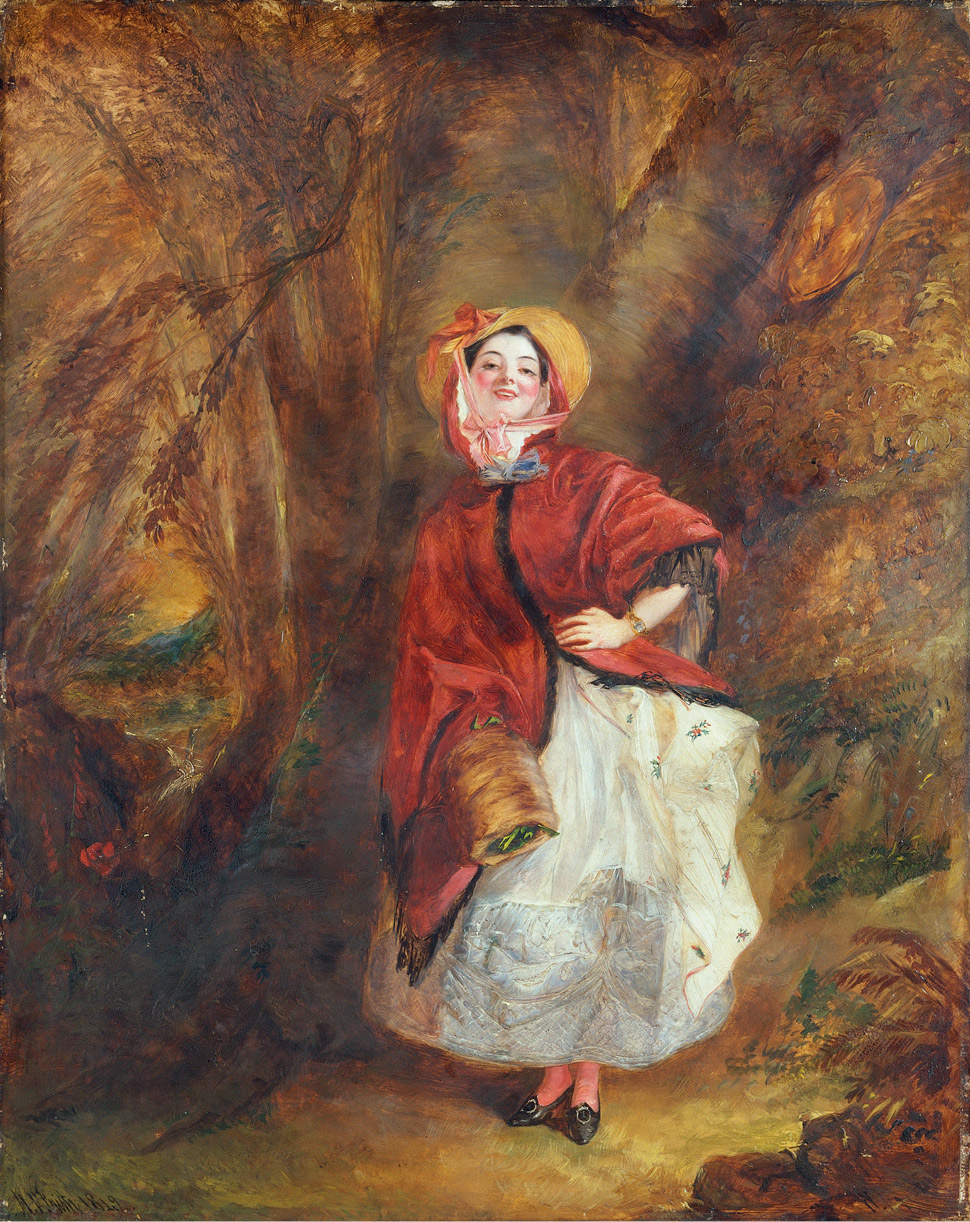
Barnaby Rudge was Dickens's first popular failure but the character of Dolly Varden—pictured in an 1842 oil painting by William Powell Frith—"pretty, witty, sexy, became central to numerous theatrical adaptations".

His success as a novelist continued. The young Queen Victoria read both Oliver Twist and The Pickwick Papers, staying up until midnight to discuss them. Nicholas Nickleby (1838–39), The Old Curiosity Shop (1840–41) and, finally, his first historical novel, Barnaby Rudge: A Tale of the Riots of 'Eighty, as part of the Master Humphrey's Clock series (1840–41), were all published in monthly instalments before being made into books. Dickens's biographer Peter Ackroyd has called Barnaby Rudge "one of Dickens's most neglected, but most rewarding, novels". The poet Edgar Allan Poe read Barnaby Rudge, and the novel's talking raven, Grip, who Dickens named after his own talking pet raven Grip, inspired in part Poe's 1845 poem "The Raven". Three ravens of the Tower of London have been named after Grip, the latest in 2012 to mark the bicentenary of Dickens's birth.

In the midst of all his activity during this period, there was discontent with his publishers and John Macrone was bought off, while Richard Bentley signed over all his rights in Oliver Twist. Other signs of a certain restlessness and discontent emerged; in Broadstairs he flirted with Eleanor Picken, the young fiancée of his solicitor's best friend and one night grabbed her and ran with her down to the sea. He declared they were both to drown there in the "sad sea waves". She finally got free, and afterwards kept her distance. In June 1841, he precipitously set out on a two-month tour of Scotland and then, in September 1841, telegraphed Forster that he had decided to go to America. His weekly periodical Master Humphrey's Clock ended, though Dickens was still keen on the idea of the weekly magazine, an appreciation that had begun with his childhood reading of Samuel Johnson's The Idler and the 18th-century magazines Tatler and The Spectator.

Dickens was perturbed by the return to power of the Tories, whom he described as "people whom, politically, I despise and abhor." He had been tempted to stand for the Liberal Party in Reading, but decided against it due to financial straits. He wrote three anti-Tory verse satires ("The Fine Old English Gentleman", "The Quack Doctor's Proclamation" and "Subjects for Painters") which were published in The Examiner.

=== First visit to the United States ===
On 22 January 1842, Dickens and his wife arrived in Boston, Massachusetts, aboard the RMS Britannia during their first trip to the United States and Canada. At this time Georgina Hogarth, another sister of Catherine, joined the Dickens household, now living at Devonshire Terrace, Marylebone, to care for the young family they had left behind. She remained with them as housekeeper, organiser, adviser and friend until Dickens's death in 1870. Dickens modelled the character of Agnes Wickfield after Georgina and Mary.

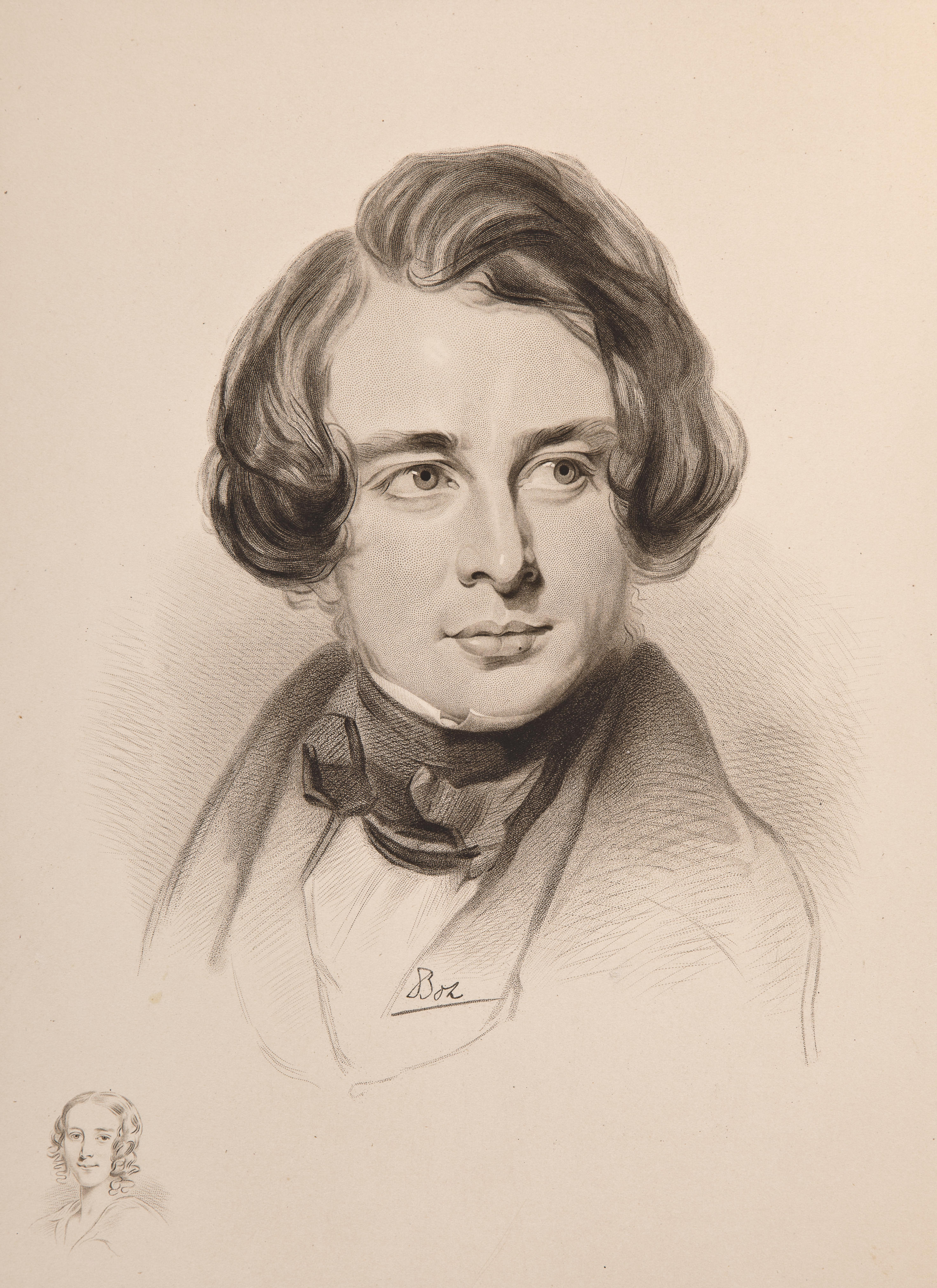
A sketch of Dickens in 1842 during his first American tour. Sketch of Dickens's sister Fanny, bottom left

He described his impressions in a travelogue, American Notes for General Circulation. In it Dickens includes a powerful condemnation of slavery which he had attacked as early as The Pickwick Papers, correlating the emancipation of the poor in England with the abolition of slavery abroad citing newspaper accounts of runaway slaves disfigured by their masters. In spite of the abolitionist sentiments gleaned from his trip to America, some modern commentators have pointed out inconsistencies in Dickens's views on racial inequality. For instance, he has been criticised for his subsequent acquiescence in Governor Edward John Eyre's harsh crackdown during the 1860s Morant Bay rebellion in Jamaica and his failure to join other British progressives in condemning it. From Richmond, Virginia, Dickens returned to Washington, D.C., and started a trek westwards, with brief pauses in Cincinnati and Louisville, Kentucky, to St. Louis. While there he expressed a desire to see an American prairie before returning east. A group of 13 men then set out with Dickens to visit Looking Glass Prairie, a trip 30 miles into Illinois.

During his American visit, Dickens spent a month in New York City, giving lectures, raising the question of international copyright laws and the pirating of his work in America. He persuaded a group of 25 writers, headed by Washington Irving, to sign a petition for him to take to the US Congress, but the press were generally hostile to this, saying that he should be grateful for his popularity and that it was mercenary to complain about his work being pirated.

The popularity he gained caused a shift in his self-perception according to the critic Kate Flint, who writes that he "found himself a cultural commodity, and its circulation had passed out his control", causing him to become interested in and delve into themes of public and personal personas in the next novels. She writes that he assumed a role of "influential commentator", publicly and in his fiction, evident in his next few books. His trip to the US ended with a trip to Canada—Niagara Falls, Toronto, Kingston, Ontario, and Montreal—where he appeared on stage in light comedies.

=== Return to England ===
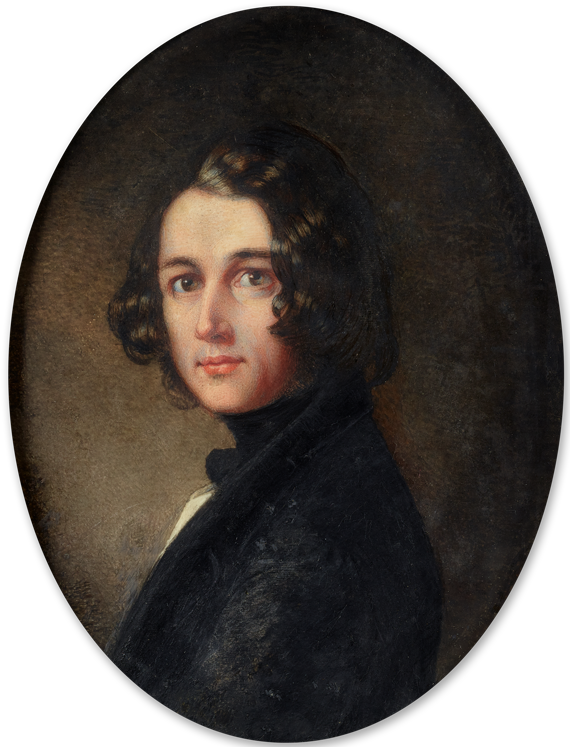
Dickens's portrait by Margaret Gillies, 1843. Painted during the period when he was writing A Christmas Carol, it was in the Royal Academy of Arts' 1844 summer exhibition. After viewing it there, Elizabeth Barrett Browning said that it showed Dickens with "the dust and mud of humanity about him, notwithstanding those eagle eyes".

Soon after his return to England, Dickens began work on the first of his Christmas stories, A Christmas Carol, written in 1843, which was followed by The Chimes in 1844 and The Cricket on the Hearth in 1845. Of these, A Christmas Carol was most popular and, tapping into an old tradition, did much to promote a renewed enthusiasm for the joys of Christmas in Britain and America. The seeds for the story became planted in Dickens's mind during a trip to Manchester to witness the conditions of the manufacturing workers there. This, along with scenes he had recently witnessed at the Field Lane Ragged School, caused Dickens to resolve to "strike a sledge hammer blow" for the poor. As the idea for the story took shape and the writing began in earnest, Dickens became engrossed in the book. He later wrote that as the tale unfolded he "wept and laughed, and wept again" as he "walked about the black streets of London fifteen or twenty miles many a night when all sober folks had gone to bed".

Between 1843 and 1844 Martin Chuzzlewit, the last of his picaresque novels, was serialised. It includes the character of Sarah Gamp, a nurse who is dissolute, sloppy and generally drunk, and also features one of the first literary private detective characters, Mr Nadgett. After living briefly in Italy (1844), Dickens travelled to Switzerland (1846), where he began work on Dombey and Son (1846–48).

At about this time, he was made aware of a large embezzlement at the firm where his brother, Augustus, worked (John Chapman & Co). It had been carried out by Thomas Powell, a clerk, who was on friendly terms with Dickens and who had acted as mentor to Augustus when he started work. Powell was also an author and poet and knew many of the famous writers of the day. After further fraudulent activities, Powell fled to New York and published a book called The Living Authors of England with a chapter on Charles Dickens, who was not amused by what Powell had written. One item that seemed to have annoyed him was the assertion that he had based the character of Paul Dombey (Dombey and Son) on Thomas Chapman, one of the principal partners at John Chapman & Co. Dickens immediately sent a letter to Lewis Gaylord Clark, editor of the New York literary magazine The Knickerbocker, saying that Powell was a forger and thief. Clark published the letter in the New-York Tribune and several other papers picked up on the story. Powell began proceedings to sue these publications and Clark was arrested. Dickens, realising that he had acted in haste, contacted John Chapman & Co to seek written confirmation of Powell's guilt. Dickens did receive a reply confirming Powell's embezzlement, but once the directors realised this information might have to be produced in court, they refused to make further disclosures. Owing to the difficulties of providing evidence in America to support his accusations, Dickens eventually made a private settlement with Powell out of court.

==== Philanthropy ====
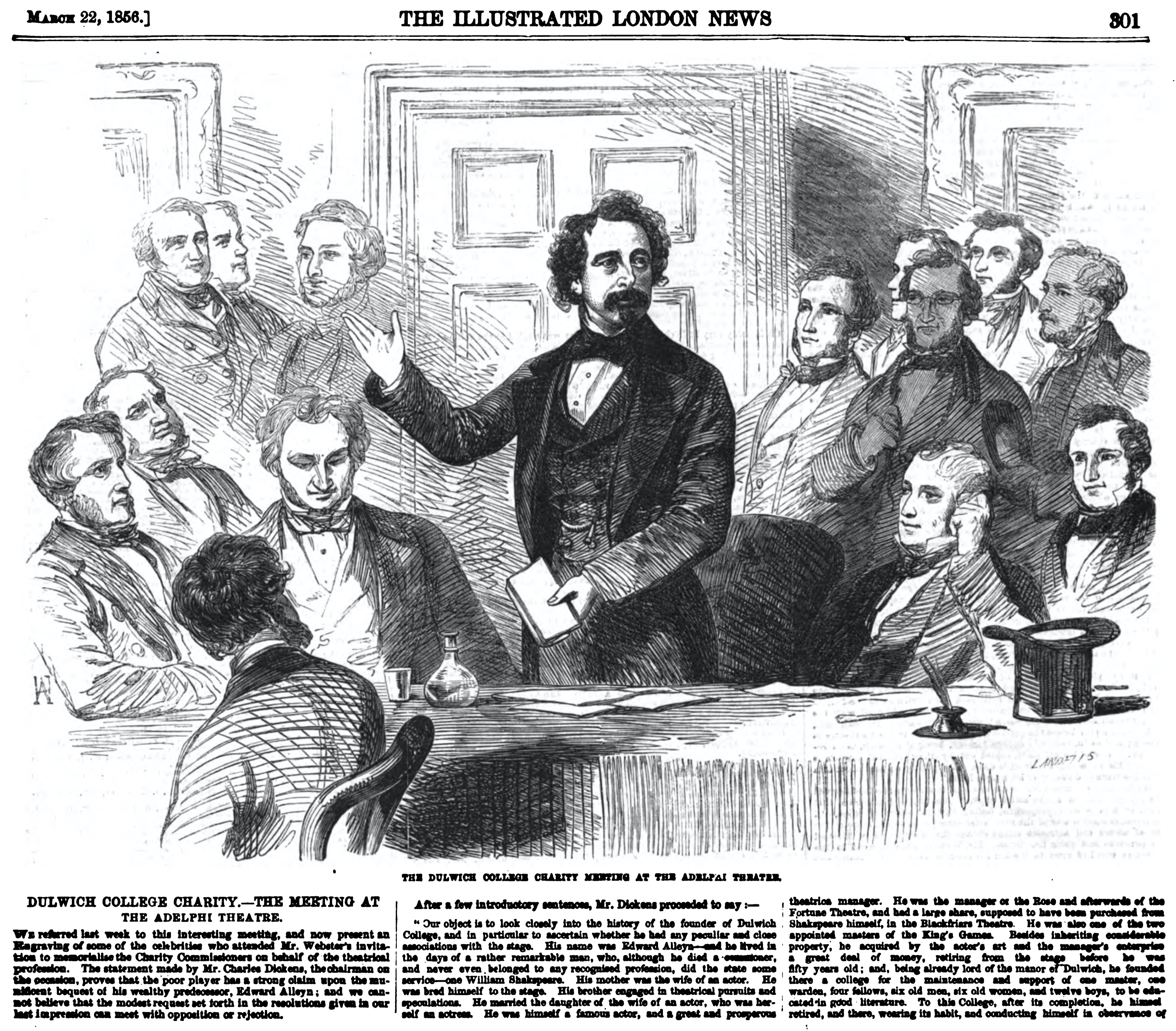
Dickens presiding over a charity meeting to discuss the future of the College of God's Gift; from The Illustrated London News, March 1856

Angela Burdett Coutts, heir to the Coutts banking fortune, approached Dickens in May 1846 about setting up a home for the redemption of fallen women of the working class. Coutts envisioned a home that would replace the punitive regimes of existing institutions with a reformative environment conducive to education and proficiency in domestic household chores. After initially resisting, Dickens eventually founded the home, named Urania Cottage, in the Lime Grove area of Shepherd's Bush, which he managed for ten years, setting the house rules, reviewing the accounts and interviewing prospective residents. Emigration and marriage were central to Dickens's agenda for the women on leaving Urania Cottage, from which it is estimated that about 100 women graduated between 1847 and 1859.

==== Religious views ====
As a young man, Dickens expressed a distaste for certain aspects of organised religion. In 1836, in a pamphlet titled Sunday Under Three Heads, he defended the people's right to pleasure, opposing a plan to prohibit games on Sundays. "Look into your churches—diminished congregations and scanty attendance. People have grown sullen and obstinate, and are becoming disgusted with the faith which condemns them to such a day as this, once in every seven. They display their feeling by staying away [from church]. Turn into the streets [on a Sunday] and mark the rigid gloom that reigns over everything around."

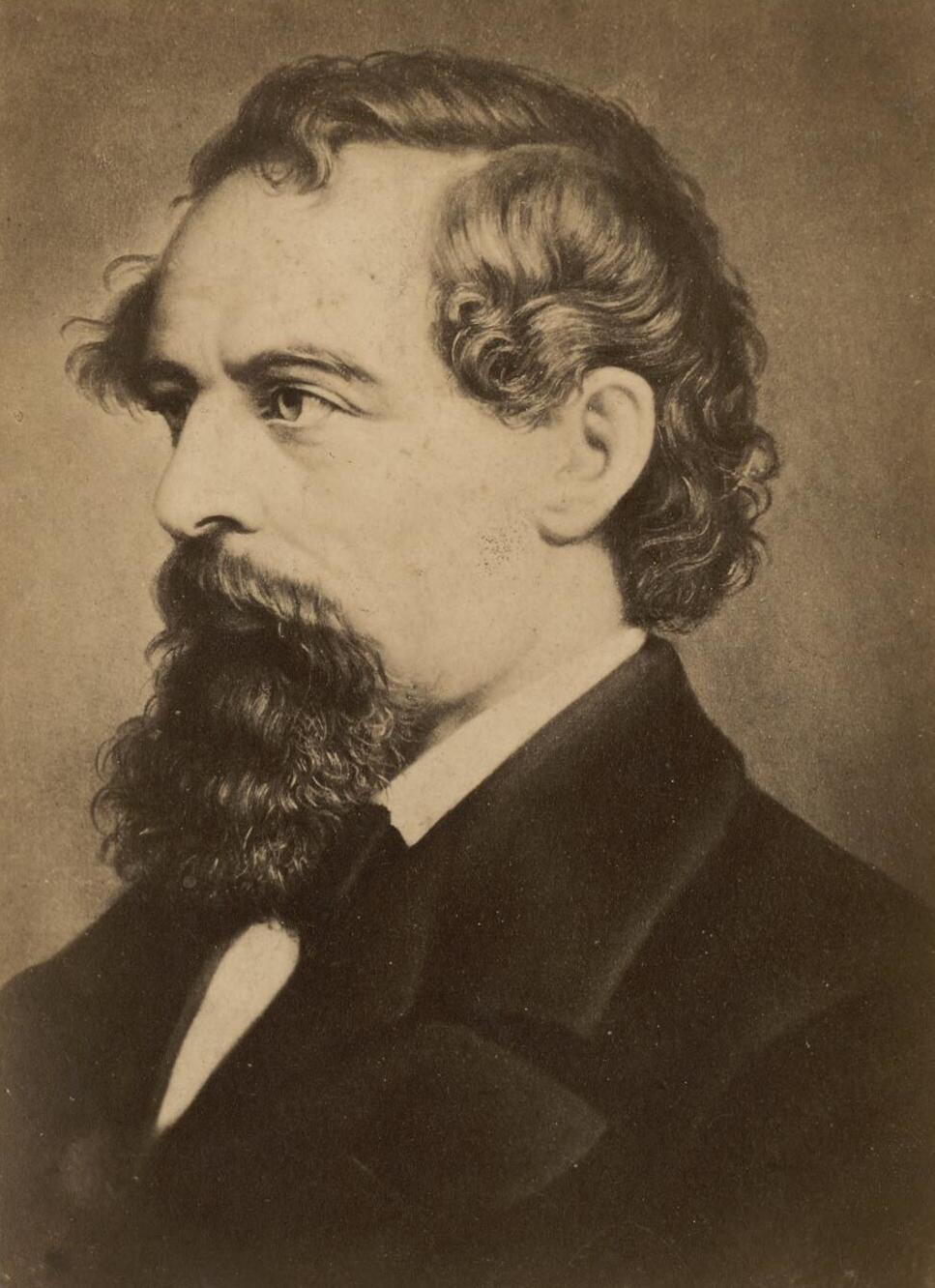
Portrait of Dickens, c. 1850, National Library of Wales

Dickens honoured the figure of Jesus Christ. He is regarded as a professing Christian. His son, Henry Fielding Dickens, described him as someone who "possessed deep religious convictions". In the early 1840s, he had shown an interest in Unitarian Christianity and Robert Browning remarked that "Mr Dickens is an enlightened Unitarian." Professor Gary Colledge has written that he "never strayed from his attachment to popular lay Anglicanism". Dickens authored a work called The Life of Our Lord (1846), a book about the life of Christ, written with the purpose of sharing his faith with his children and family. In a scene from David Copperfield, Dickens echoed Geoffrey Chaucer's use of Luke 23:34 from Troilus and Criseyde (Dickens held a copy in his library), with G. K. Chesterton writing, "among the great canonical English authors, Chaucer and Dickens have the most in common."

Dickens disapproved of Catholicism and 19th-century evangelicalism, seeing both as extremes of Christianity and likely to limit personal expression, and was critical of what he saw as the hypocrisy of religious institutions and philosophies like spiritualism, all of which he considered deviations from the true spirit of Christianity, as shown in the book he wrote for his family in 1846. While Dickens advocated equal rights for Catholics in England, he strongly disliked how individual civil liberties were often threatened in countries where Catholicism predominated and referred to the Catholic Church as "that curse upon the world." Dickens also rejected the Evangelical conviction that the Bible was the infallible word of God. His ideas on Biblical interpretation were similar to the Liberal Anglican Arthur Penrhyn Stanley's doctrine of "progressive revelation". Leo Tolstoy and Fyodor Dostoyevsky referred to Dickens as "that great Christian writer".

== Middle years ==
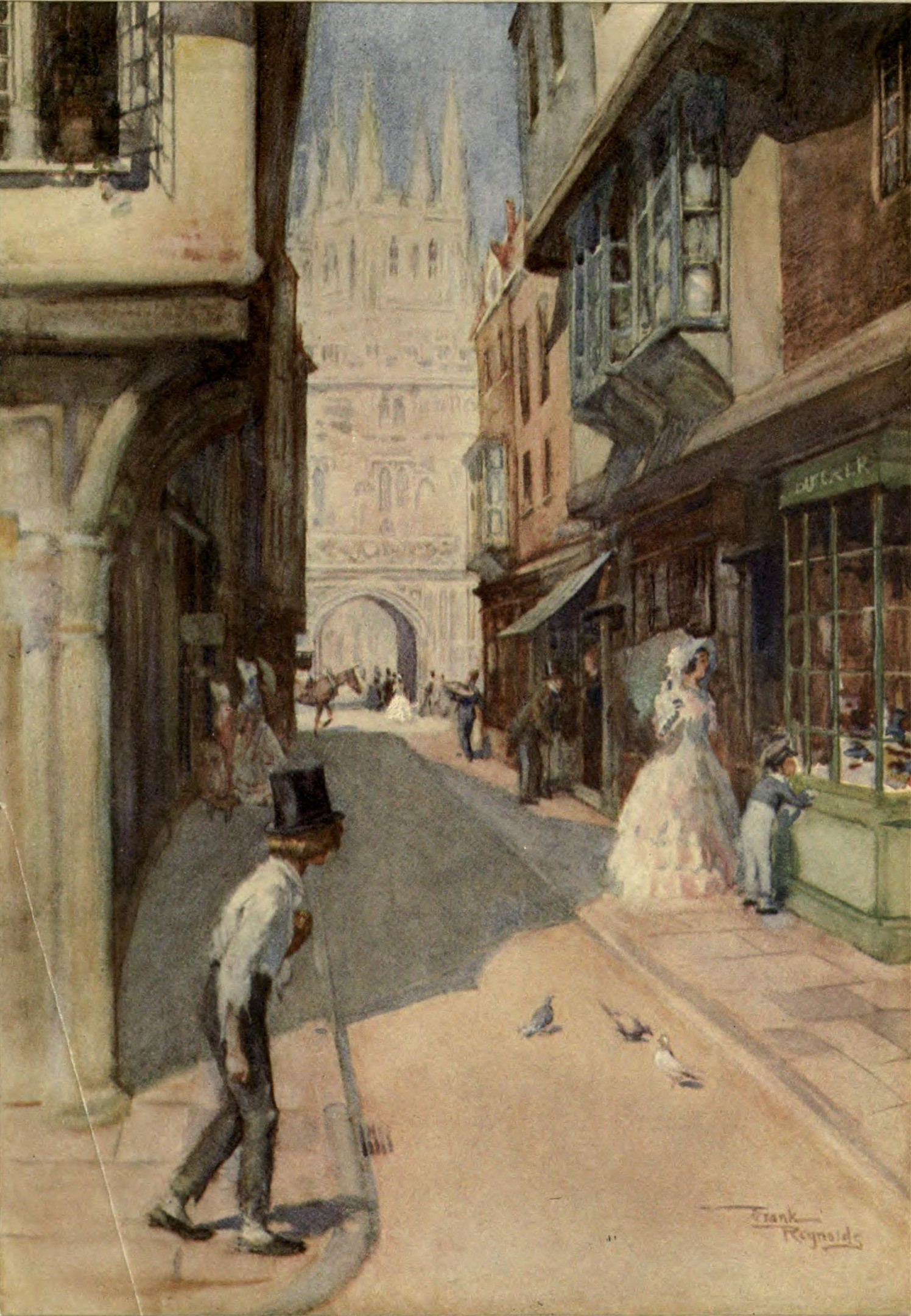
David reaches Canterbury, from David Copperfield. The character incorporates many elements of Dickens's own life. Artwork by Frank Reynolds.

In December 1845 Dickens took up the editorship of the London-based Daily News, a liberal paper through which Dickens hoped to advocate, in his own words, "the Principles of Progress and Improvement, of Education and Civil and Religious Liberty and Equal Legislation." Among the other contributors Dickens chose to write for the paper were the radical economist Thomas Hodgskin and the social reformer Douglas William Jerrold, who frequently attacked the Corn Laws. Dickens lasted only ten weeks on the job before resigning due to a combination of exhaustion and frustration with one of the paper's co-owners.

A Francophile, Dickens often holidayed in France and, in a speech delivered in Paris in 1846 in French, called the French "the first people in the universe". During his visit to Paris, Dickens met the French literati Alexandre Dumas, Victor Hugo, Eugène Scribe, Théophile Gautier, François-René de Chateaubriand and Eugène Sue. In early 1849 Dickens started to write David Copperfield. It was published between 1849 and 1850. In Dickens's biography, Life of Charles Dickens (1872), John Forster wrote of David Copperfield, "underneath the fiction lay something of the author's life". It was Dickens's personal favourite among his novels, as he wrote in the preface to the 1867 edition. His collection of letters, of which more than 14,000 are known, covered a wide range of subject-matter. Letters during this period included a correspondence with Mary Tyler, dated 6 November 1849, on the comedic merits of Punch and Judy, a puppet show dominated by the anarchic clowning of Mr. Punch, and his review of the Great Exhibition, the first in a series of world's fairs, which he attended at Hyde Park, London, in 1851. After the First Opium War Dickens viewed China through a lens of both mockery and fear, alluding to the Western "yellow peril" stereotype. During his visit to the Great Exhibition, he scorned Chinese exhibits as symbols of stagnation, labelling them a "glory of yellow jaundice", writing progress was hindered by the isolationist approach of the Qing dynasty with "China, shutting itself up, as far as possible, within itself."

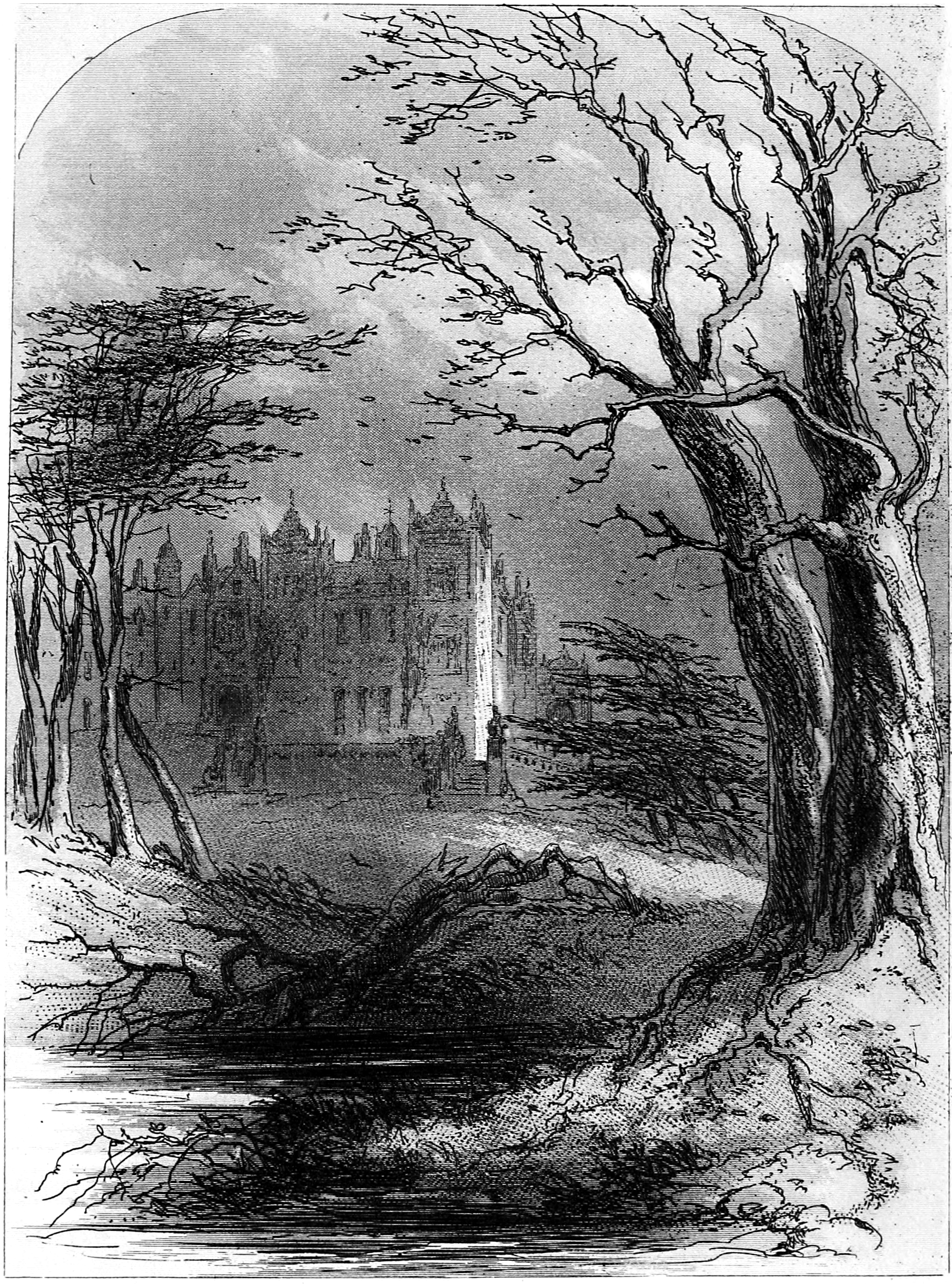
Illustration by Phiz of Chesney Wold, the Lincolnshire estate in Bleak House

In late 1851, Dickens moved into Tavistock House where he wrote Bleak House (1852–53), Hard Times (1854) and Little Dorrit (1855–57). A work incorporating Gothic elements such as the depiction of London as a murky city swathed in fog, Bleak House is credited with introducing urban fog to the novel, which would become a frequent characteristic of urban Gothic literature and film. Reflecting the public enthusiasm for dinosaurs that first developed in Victorian England, the opening of Bleak House contains an early mention of dinosaurs in literature: "it would not be wonderful to meet a Megalosaurus, forty feet long or so, waddling like an elephantine lizard up Holborn Hill".

While at Tavistock Dickens indulged in amateur theatricals, and he worked closely with the novelist and playwright Wilkie Collins. In 1856, his income from writing allowed him to buy Gads Hill Place in Higham, Kent. As a child Dickens had walked past the house and dreamt of living in it. The area was also the scene of some of the events of William Shakespeare's Henry IV, Part 1 and this literary connection pleased him. During this time Dickens was also the publisher, editor and a major contributor to the journals Household Words (1850–1859) and All the Year Round (1858–1870), with both titles deriving from a Shakespearean quotation. The journals contained a mix of fiction and non-fiction, and dealt with aspects in the culture. For example, the latter included Dickens's assessment of Madame Tussauds, a wax museum established in Baker Street in 1835, which he called "something more than an exhibition, it is an institution." In 1854, at the behest of Sir John Franklin's widow Lady Jane, Dickens viciously attacked Arctic explorer John Rae in Household Words for his report to the Admiralty, based on interviews with local Inuit, that the members of Franklin's lost expedition had resorted to cannibalism. These attacks would later be expanded on his 1856 play The Frozen Deep, a collaboration with Wilkie Collins, which satirises Rae and the Inuit. Twentieth-century archaeology work in King William Island later confirmed that the members of the Franklin expedition resorted to cannibalism.

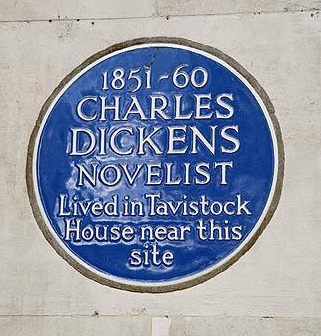
Commemorative blue plaque in Tavistock Square, London where Dickens lived between 1851 and 1860

In 1855, when Dickens's good friend the Liberal MP Austen Henry Layard formed an Administrative Reform Association to demand significant reforms of Parliament, Dickens joined and volunteered his resources in support of Layard's cause. With the exception of Lord John Russell, who was the only leading politician in whom Dickens had any faith and to whom he later dedicated A Tale of Two Cities, Dickens believed that the political aristocracy and their incompetence were the death of England. When he and Layard were accused of fomenting class conflict, Dickens replied that the classes were already in opposition and the fault was with the aristocratic class. Dickens used his pulpit in Household Words to champion the Reform Association. He also commented on foreign affairs, declaring his support for Giuseppe Garibaldi and Giuseppe Mazzini, helping raise funds for their campaigns and stating that "a united Italy would be of vast importance to the peace of the world, and would be a rock in Louis Napoleon's way," and that "I feel for Italy almost as if I were an Italian born." Dickens also published dozens of writings in Household Words supporting vaccination, including multiple laudations for the vaccine pioneer Edward Jenner.

Following the Indian Mutiny of 1857, Dickens joined in the widespread criticism of the East India Company for its role in the event, but reserved his fury for Indians, wishing that he was the commander-in-chief in India so that he would be able to "do my utmost to exterminate the Race upon whom the stain of the late cruelties rested."

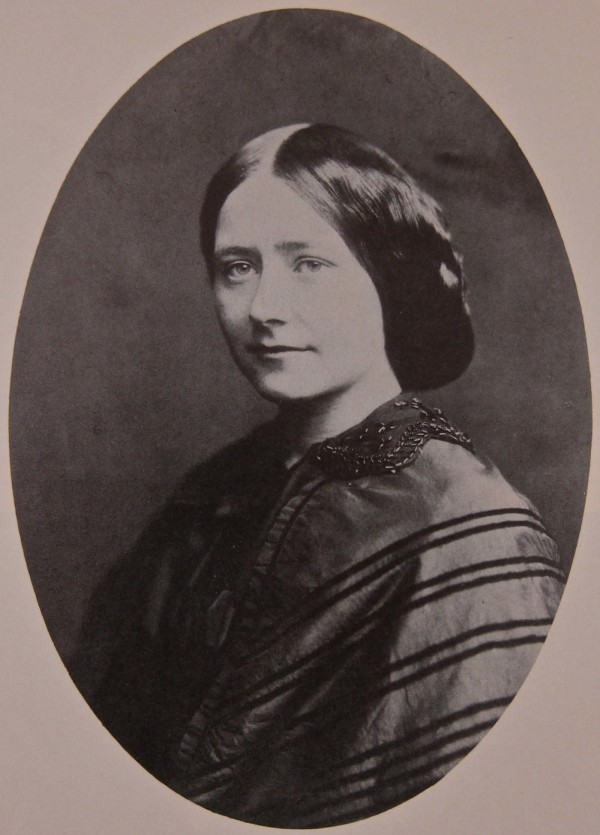
The actress Ellen Ternan (pictured in 1858) drew the attention of Dickens after he saw her on stage in 1857.

In 1857 Dickens hired professional actresses for The Frozen Deep, which he and his protégé Wilkie Collins had written. Dickens fell in love with one of the actresses, Ellen Ternan, and this passion was to last the rest of his life. In 1858, when Dickens was 45 and Ternan 18, divorce would have been scandalous for someone of his fame. After publicly accusing Catherine of not loving their children and suffering from "a mental disorder"—statements that disgusted his contemporaries, including Elizabeth Barrett Browning—Dickens attempted to have Catherine institutionalised. When his scheme failed, they separated. Catherine left, never to see her husband again, taking with her one child. Her sister Georgina, who stayed at Gads Hill, raised the other children.

During this period, whilst pondering a project to give public readings for his own profit, Dickens was approached through a charitable appeal by Great Ormond Street Hospital to help it survive its first major financial crisis. His "Drooping Buds" essay in Household Words earlier on 3 April 1852 was considered by the hospital's founders to have been the catalyst for the hospital's success. Dickens, whose philanthropy was well-known, was asked by his friend, the hospital's founder Charles West, to preside over the appeal, and he threw himself into the task, heart and soul. Dickens's public readings secured sufficient funds for an endowment to put the hospital on a sound financial footing; one reading on 9 February 1858 alone raised £3,000.

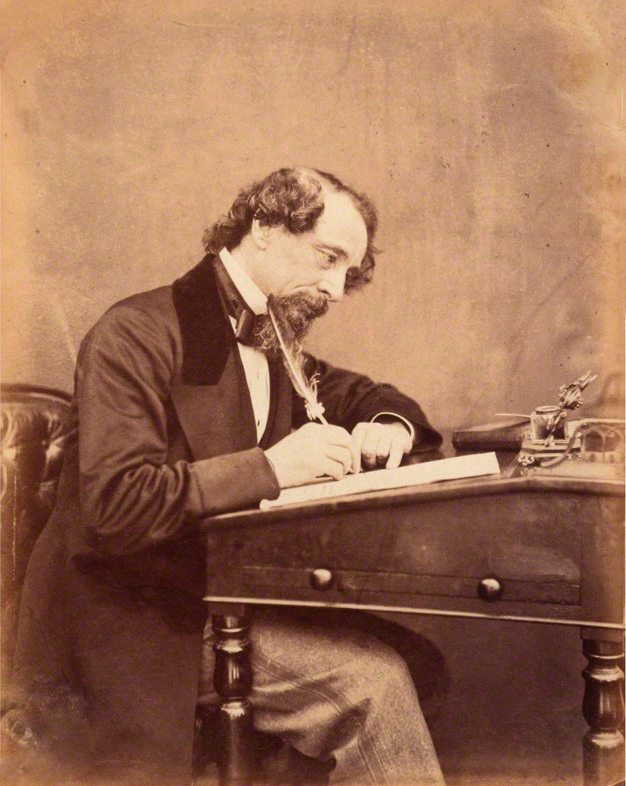
Dickens at his desk, 1858, by Herbert Watkins

After separating from Catherine, Dickens undertook a series of popular and remunerative reading tours which, together with his journalism, were to absorb most of his creative energies for the next decade, in which he was to write only two novels. His first reading tour, lasting from April 1858 to February 1859, consisted of 129 appearances in 49 towns throughout England, Scotland and Ireland. Dickens's continued fascination with the theatrical world was written into the theatre scenes in Nicholas Nickleby, and he found an outlet in public readings. In 1866, he undertook a series of public readings in England and Scotland, with more the following year in England and Ireland.

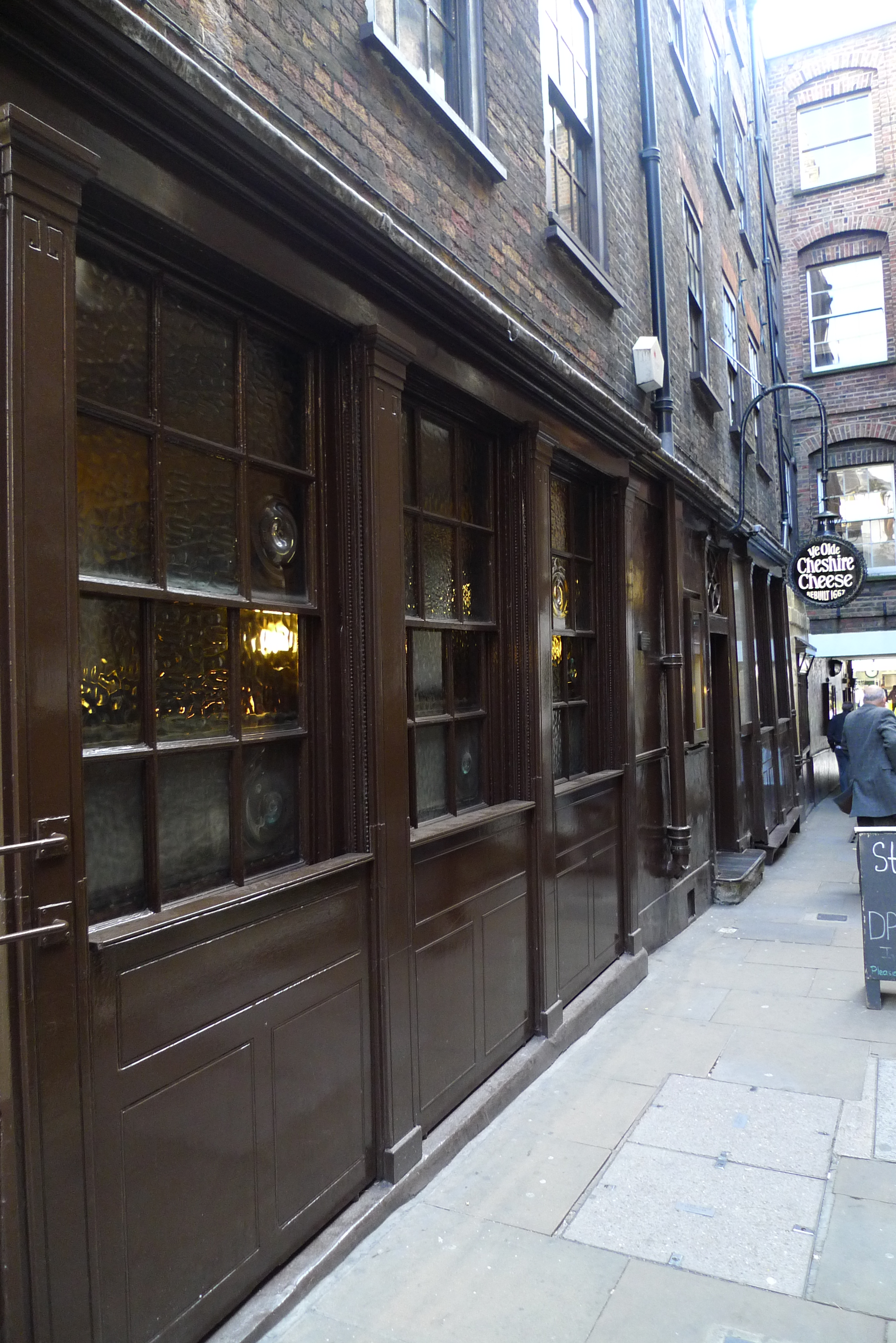
Dickens was a regular patron at Ye Olde Cheshire Cheese pub in Fleet Street, London. He included the venue in A Tale of Two Cities.

Other works soon followed, including A Tale of Two Cities (1859) and Great Expectations (1861), which were resounding successes. Set in London and Paris, A Tale of Two Cities is his best-known work of historical fiction and includes the famous opening sentence "It was the best of times, it was the worst of times." It is regularly touted as one of the best-selling novels of all time. Themes in Great Expectations include wealth and poverty, love and rejection, and the eventual triumph of good over evil.

In early September 1860, in a field behind Gads Hill, Dickens made a bonfire of most of his correspondence; he spared only letters on business matters. Since Ellen Ternan also destroyed all of his letters to her, the extent of the affair between the two remains speculative. In the 1930s, Thomas Wright recounted that Ternan had unburdened herself to a Canon Benham and gave currency to rumours they had been lovers. Dickens's daughter, Kate Perugini, stated that the two had a son who died in infancy to biographer Gladys Storey in an interview before the former's death in 1929. Storey published her account in Dickens and Daughter, though no contemporary evidence was given. On his death, Dickens settled an annuity on Ternan which made her financially independent. Claire Tomalin's book The Invisible Woman argues that Ternan lived with Dickens secretly for the last 13 years of his life. The book was turned into a play, Little Nell, by Simon Gray, and a 2013 film. During the same period, Dickens furthered his interest in the paranormal, becoming one of the early members of The Ghost Club in London. In Christmas Eve of 1862, a theatrical production of his novella, The Haunted Man and the Ghost's Bargain, saw the first public demonstration of "Pepper's ghost"—a method of projecting the illusion of a ghost into a theatre (named after its developer John Henry Pepper)—which caused a sensation among those in attendance at the Regent Street theatre.

In June 1862 he was offered £10,000 for a reading tour of Australia. He was enthusiastic, and even planned a travel book, The Uncommercial Traveller Upside Down, but ultimately decided against the tour. Two of his sons, Alfred D'Orsay Tennyson Dickens and Edward Bulwer Lytton Dickens, migrated to Australia, Edward becoming a member of the Parliament of New South Wales as Member for Wilcannia between 1889 and 1894.

== Later life ==
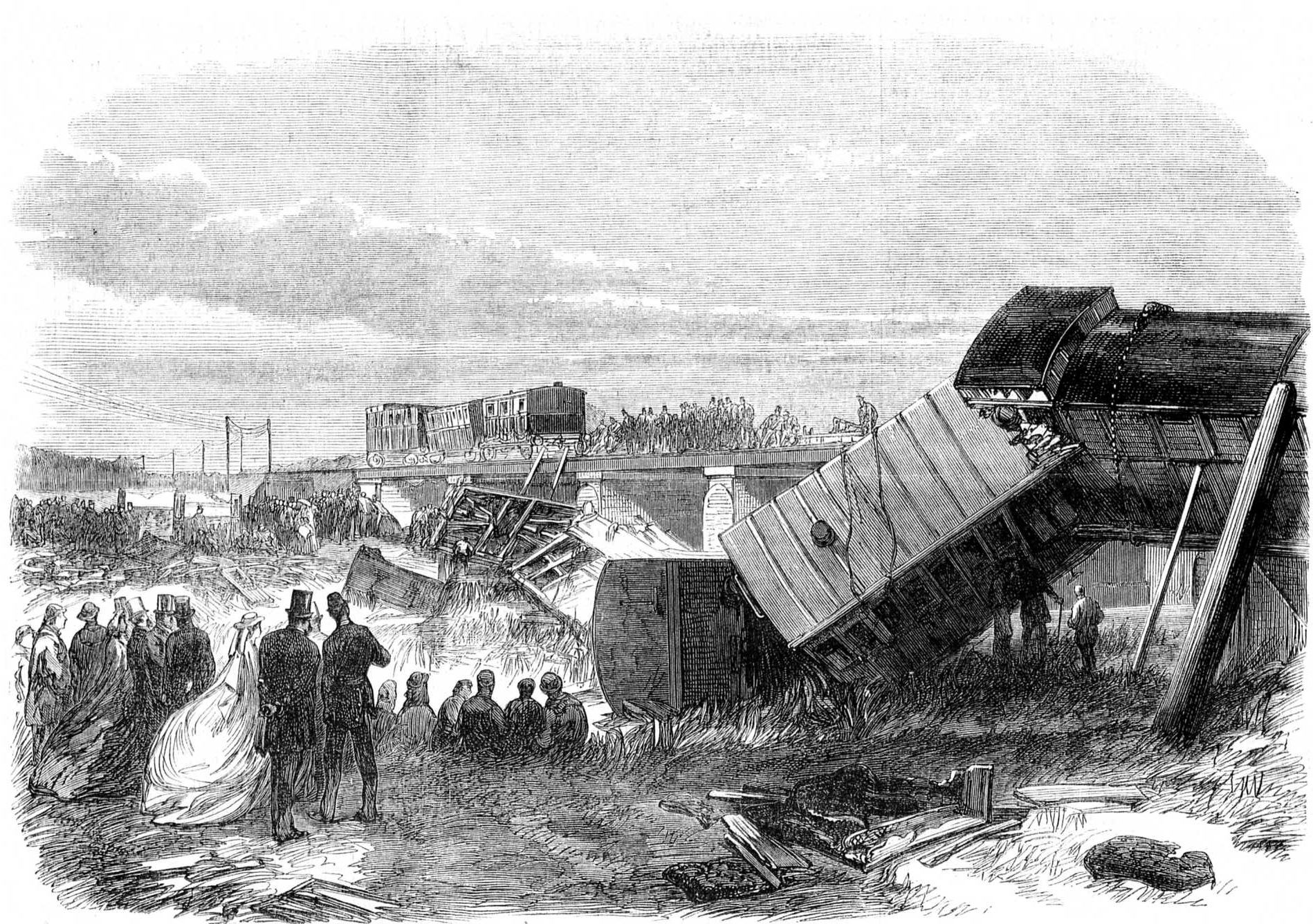
Aftermath of the Staplehurst rail crash in 1865

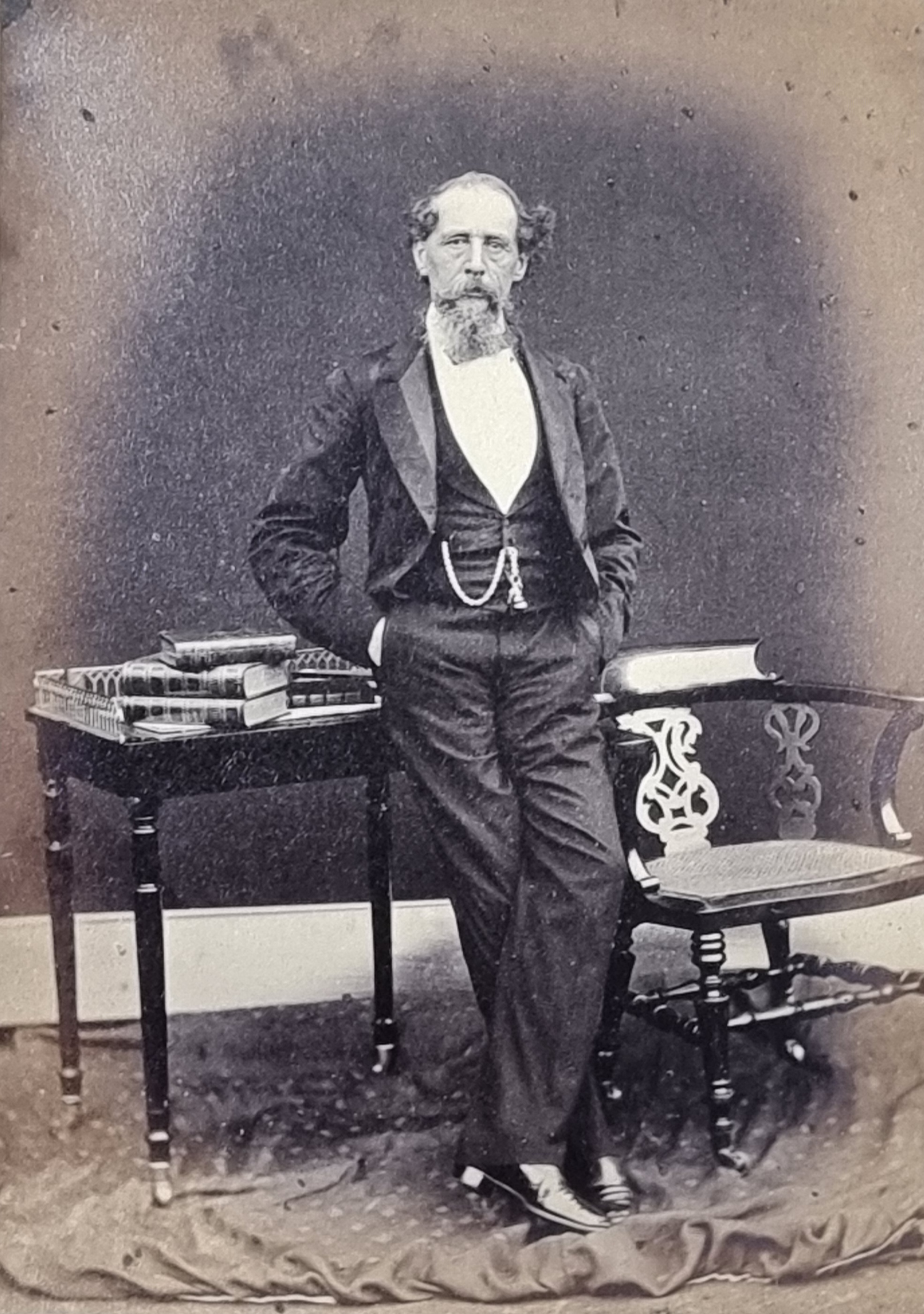
Dickens, c. 1866, by Ernest Edwards

On 9 June 1865, while returning from Paris with Ellen Ternan, Dickens was involved in the Staplehurst rail crash in Kent. The train's first seven carriages plunged off a cast iron bridge that was under repair and ten passengers were killed. The only first-class carriage to remain on the track—which was left hanging precariously off the bridge—was the one in which Dickens was travelling. For three hours before rescuers arrived, Dickens tended and comforted the wounded and the dying with a flask of brandy and a hat refreshed with water. Before leaving, he remembered the unfinished manuscript for Our Mutual Friend, and he returned to his carriage to retrieve it.

Dickens later used the experience of the crash as material for his short ghost story, "The Signal-Man", in which the central character has a premonition of his own death in a rail crash. He also based the story on several previous rail accidents, such as the Clayton Tunnel rail crash in Sussex of 1861. Dickens managed to avoid an appearance at the inquest to avoid disclosing that he had been travelling with Ternan and her mother, which would have caused a scandal. After the crash, Dickens was nervous when travelling by train and would use alternative means when available. In 1868 he wrote, "I have sudden vague rushes of terror, even when riding in a hansom cab, which are perfectly unreasonable but quite insurmountable." Dickens's son, Henry, recalled, "I have seen him sometimes in a railway carriage when there was a slight jolt. When this happened he was almost in a state of panic and gripped the seat with both hands."

=== Second visit to the United States ===
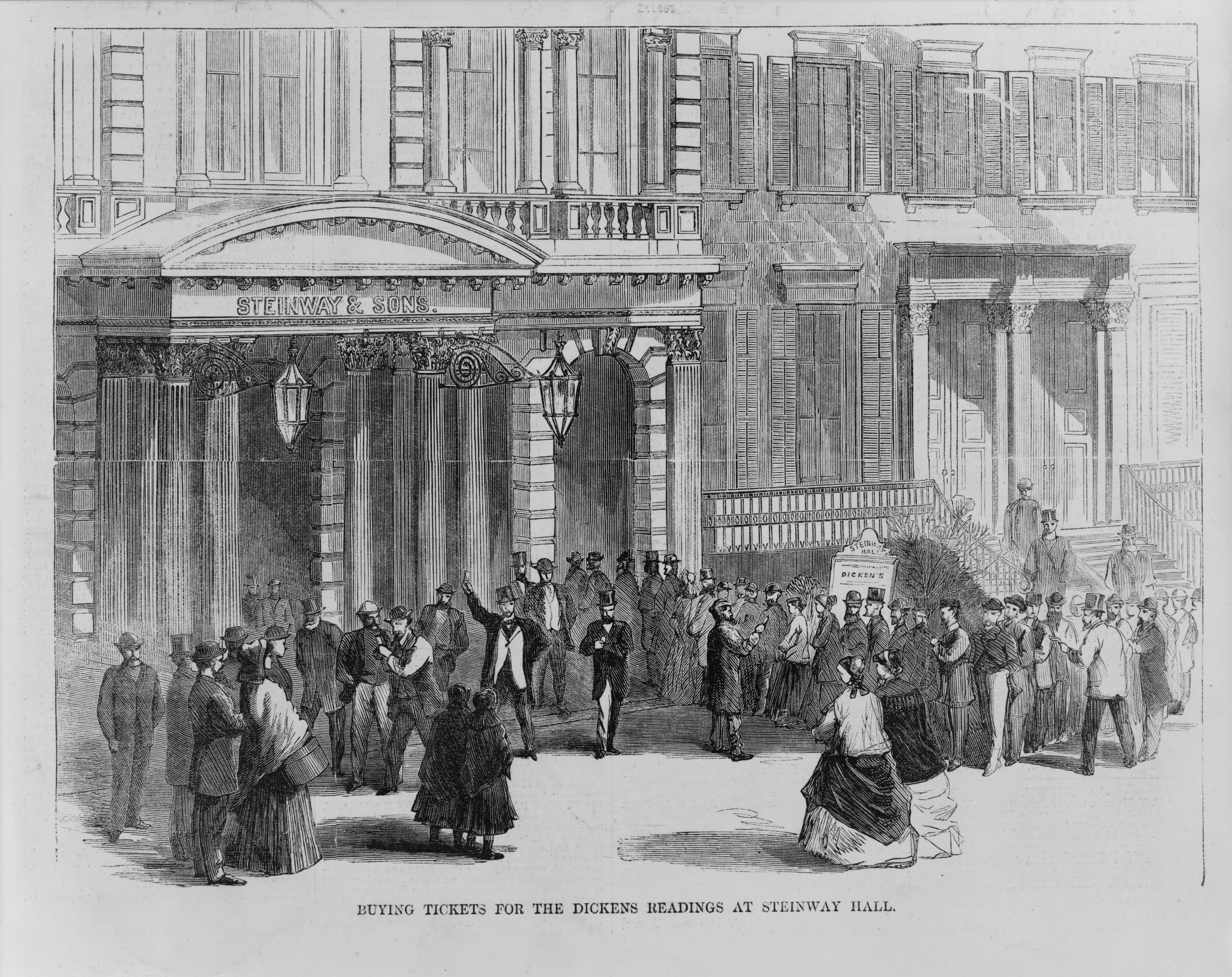
Crowd of spectators buying tickets for a Dickens reading at Steinway Hall, New York City, in 1867

While he contemplated a second visit to the United States, the outbreak of the Civil War in America in 1861 delayed his plans. On 9 November 1867, over two years after the war, Dickens set sail from Liverpool for his second American reading tour. Landing in Boston, he devoted the rest of the month to a round of dinners with such notables as Ralph Waldo Emerson, Henry Wadsworth Longfellow and his American publisher, James T. Fields. In early December, the readings began. He performed 76 readings, netting £19,000, from December 1867 to April 1868. Dickens shuttled between Boston and New York, where he gave 22 readings at Steinway Hall. Although he had started to suffer from what he called the "true American catarrh", he kept to a packed schedule, even managing to squeeze in some sleighing in Central Park.

During his travels, he saw a change in the people and the circumstances of America. His final appearance was at a banquet the American Press held in his honour at Delmonico's on 18 April, when he promised never to denounce America again. By the end of the tour Dickens could hardly manage solid food, subsisting on champagne and eggs beaten in sherry. On 23 April he boarded the Cunard liner Russia to return to Britain, barely escaping a federal tax lien against the proceeds of his lecture tour.

=== Farewell readings ===
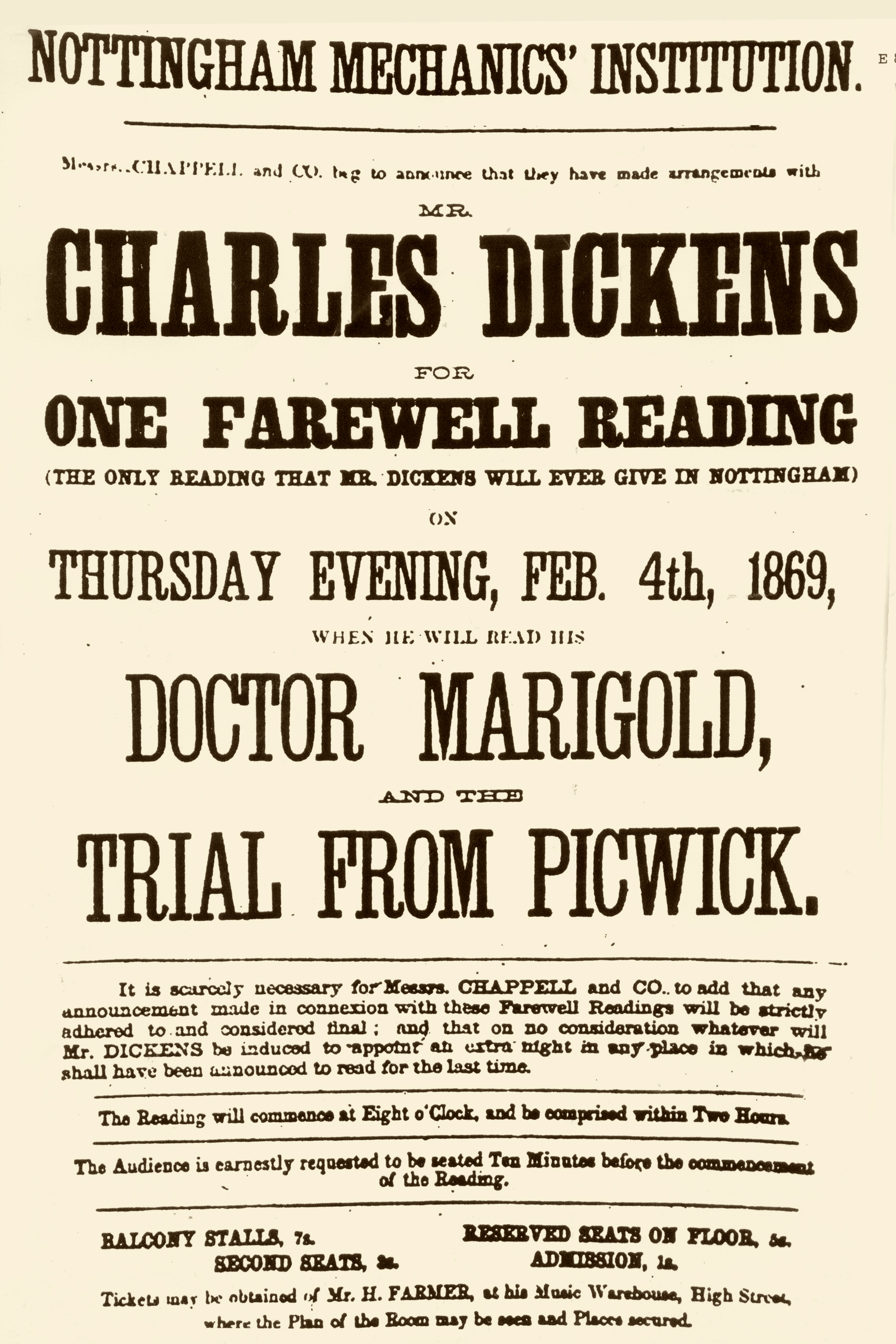
Poster promoting a reading by Dickens in Nottingham dated 4 February 1869, two months before he had a mild stroke

In 1868–69 Dickens gave a series of "farewell readings" in England, Scotland and Ireland, beginning on 6 October. He managed, of a contracted 100 readings, to give 75 in the provinces, with a further 12 in London. As he pressed on he was affected by giddiness and fits of paralysis. He had a stroke on 18 April 1869 in Chester. He collapsed on 22 April 1869, in Preston, Lancashire; on doctor's advice, the tour was cancelled. After further provincial readings were cancelled, he began work on his final novel, The Mystery of Edwin Drood. Described as a "dark and gothic" tale, his unfinished novel focuses on Drood's uncle, John Jasper, a drug-addicted choirmaster. It was fashionable in the 1860s to 'do the slums' and, in company, Dickens visited opium dens in Shadwell in the East End of London, where he witnessed an elderly addict called "Laskar Sal", who formed the model for "Opium Sal" in Edwin Drood.

After Dickens regained enough strength, he arranged, with medical approval, for a final series of readings to partly make up to his sponsors what they had lost due to his illness. There were 12 performances, on 11 January to 15 March 1870; the last at 8:00pm at St James's Hall, London. Though in grave health by then, he read A Christmas Carol and The Trial from Pickwick. On 2 May, he made his last public appearance at a Royal Academy banquet in the presence of the Prince and Princess of Wales, paying a special tribute on the death of his friend the illustrator Daniel Maclise.

=== Death ===
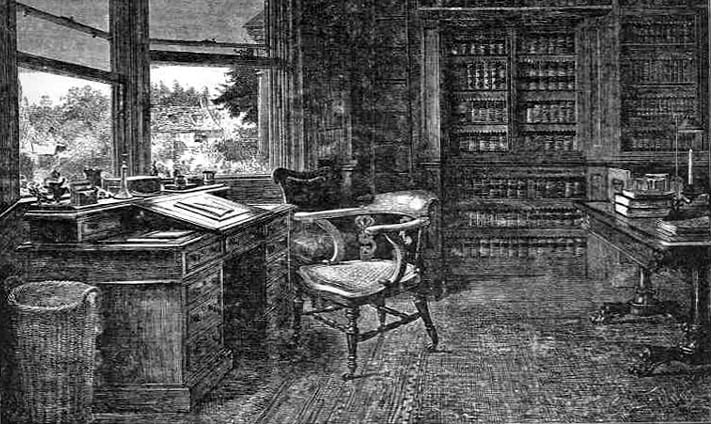
Samuel Luke Fildes – The Empty Chair. Fildes was illustrating Edwin Drood at the time of Dickens's death. The engraving shows Dickens's empty chair in his study at Gads Hill Place. It appeared in the Christmas 1870 edition of The Graphic and thousands of prints of it were sold.

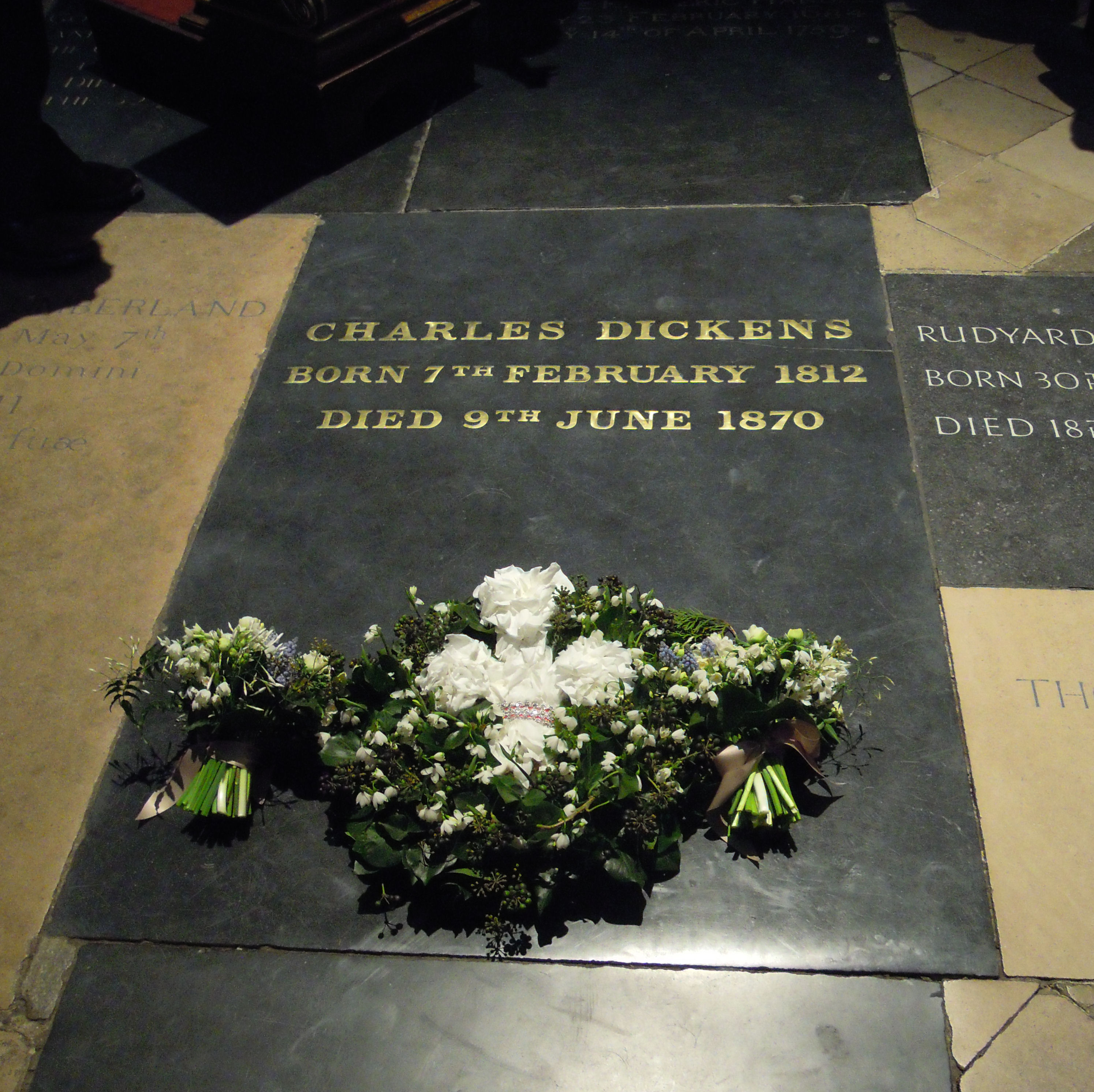
Dickens's grave in Westminster Abbey

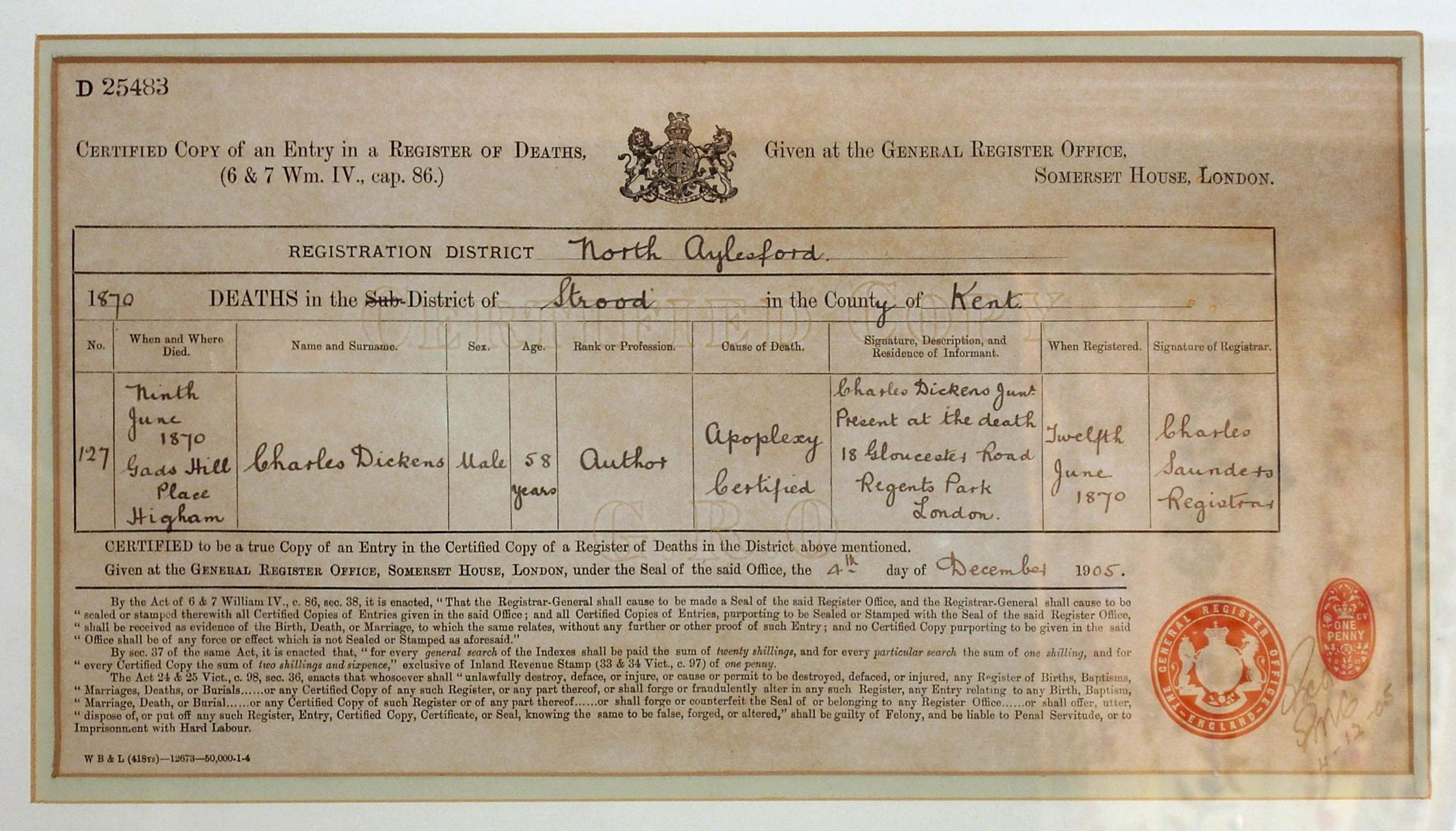
A 1905 transcribed copy of the death certificate of Charles Dickens

On 8 June 1870 Dickens had another stroke at his home after a full day's work on Edwin Drood. He never regained consciousness. The next day, he died at Gads Hill Place, aged 58. His biographer Claire Tomalin has suggested Dickens was actually in Peckham when he had had the stroke and his mistress Ellen Ternan and her maids had him taken back to Gads Hill so that the public would not know the truth about their relationship. Contrary to his wish to be buried at Rochester Cathedral "in an inexpensive, unostentatious, and strictly private manner", he was laid to rest in Poets' Corner in Westminster Abbey. A printed epitaph circulated at the time of the funeral reads:

To the Memory of Charles Dickens (England's most popular author) who died at his residence, Higham, near Rochester, Kent, 9 June 1870, aged 58 years. He was a sympathiser with the poor, the suffering, and the oppressed; and by his death, one of England's greatest writers is lost to the world.

A letter from Dickens to the Clerk of the Privy Council in March indicates he had been offered and accepted a baronetcy, which was not gazetted before his death. His last words were "On the ground" in response to his sister-in-law Georgina's request that he lie down. (Note: A contemporary obituary in The Times, alleged that Dickens's last words were: "Be natural my children. For the writer that is natural has fulfilled all the rules of Art." Reprinted from The Times, London, August 1870 in Bidwell 1870, p. 223.) On Sunday, 19 June 1870, five days after Dickens was buried in the Abbey, Dean Arthur Penrhyn Stanley delivered a memorial elegy, lauding "the genial and loving humorist whom we now mourn", for showing by his own example "that even in dealing with the darkest scenes and the most degraded characters, genius could still be clean, and mirth could be innocent". Pointing to the fresh flowers that adorned the novelist's grave, Stanley assured those present that "the spot would thenceforth be a sacred one with both the New World and the Old, as that of the representative of literature, not of this island only, but of all who speak our English tongue."

In his will, drafted more than a year before his death, Dickens left the care of his £80,000 estate (£8,000,000 in 2025) to his long-time colleague John Forster and his "best and truest friend" Georgina Hogarth who, along with Dickens's two sons, also received a tax-free sum of £8,000 (equivalent to £800,000 in 2025). He confirmed his wife Catherine's annual allowance of £600 (£60,000 in 2025). He bequeathed £19 19s (£2,000 in 2025) to each servant in his employment at the time of his death.

== Literary style ==
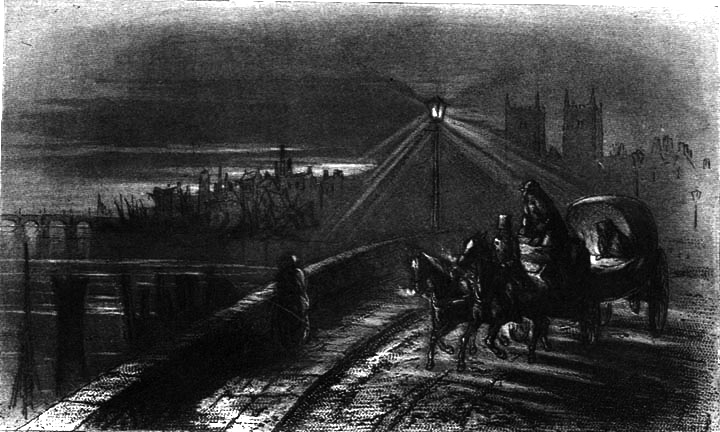
"The Night" scene in Bleak House, depicting a murky Westminster Bridge in London. Dickens set the Gothic novel in an urban environment.

Dickens's approach to the novel is influenced by various things, including the picaresque novel tradition, melodrama and the novel of sensibility. According to Ackroyd, other than these, perhaps the most important literary influence on him was derived from the fables of The Arabian Nights. Satire and irony are central to the picaresque novel. Comedy is also an aspect of the British picaresque novel tradition of Laurence Sterne, Henry Fielding and Tobias Smollett. Fielding's Tom Jones was a major influence on the 19th-century novelist including Dickens, who read it in his youth and named a son Henry Fielding Dickens after him. Influenced by Gothic fiction—a literary genre that began with The Castle of Otranto (1764) by Horace Walpole—Dickens incorporated Gothic imagery, settings and plot devices in his works. Victorian gothic moved from castles and abbeys into contemporary urban environments: in particular London, such as Dickens's Oliver Twist and Bleak House. The jilted bride Miss Havisham from Great Expectations is one of Dickens's best-known gothic creations; living in a ruined mansion, her bridal gown effectively doubles as her funeral shroud.

No other writer had such a profound influence on Dickens as William Shakespeare. On Dickens's veneration of Shakespeare, Alfred Harbage wrote in A Kind of Power: The Shakespeare-Dickens Analogy (1975) that "No one is better qualified to recognise literary genius than a literary genius". Regarding Shakespeare as "the great master" whose plays "were an unspeakable source of delight", Dickens's lifelong affinity with the playwright included seeing theatrical productions of his plays in London and putting on amateur dramatics with friends in his early years. In 1838, Dickens travelled to Stratford-upon-Avon and visited the house in which Shakespeare was born, leaving his autograph in the visitors' book. Dickens would draw on this experience in his next work, Nicholas Nickleby (1838–39), expressing the strength of feeling experienced by visitors to Shakespeare's birthplace: the character Mrs Wititterly states, "I don't know how it is, but after you've seen the place and written your name in the little book, somehow or other you seem to be inspired; it kindles up quite a fire within one."

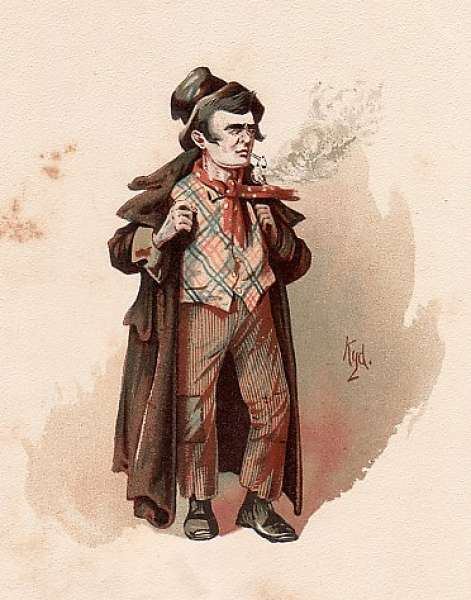
The Artful Dodger from Oliver Twist. His dialect is rooted in Cockney English.

Dickens's writing style is marked by a profuse linguistic creativity. Satire, flourishing in his gift for caricature, is his forte. An early reviewer compared him to the artist and social critic William Hogarth for his keen practical sense of the ludicrous side of life, though his acclaimed mastery of varieties of class idiom may in fact mirror the conventions of contemporary popular theatre. Dickens worked intensively on developing arresting names for his characters that would reverberate with associations for his readers and assist the development of motifs in the storyline, giving what one critic calls an "allegorical impetus" to the novels' meanings. To cite one of numerous examples, the name Mr Murdstone in David Copperfield conjures up twin allusions to murder and stony coldness. His literary style is also a mixture of fantasy and realism. His satires of British aristocratic snobbery—he calls one character the "Noble Refrigerator"—are often popular. Comparing orphans to stocks and shares, people to tug boats or dinner-party guests to furniture are just some of Dickens's acclaimed flights of fancy. On his ability to elicit a response from his works, the English screenwriter Sarah Phelps writes, "He knew how to work an audience and how to get them laughing their heads off one minute or on the edge of their seats and holding their breath the next. The other thing about Dickens is that he loved telling stories and he loved his characters, even those horrible, mean-spirited ones."

The author worked closely with his illustrators, supplying them with a summary of the work at the outset and thus ensuring that his characters and settings were exactly how he envisioned them. He briefed the illustrator on plans for each month's instalment so that work could begin before he wrote them. Marcus Stone, illustrator of Our Mutual Friend, recalled that the author was always "ready to describe down to the minutest details the personal characteristics, and ... life-history of the creations of his fancy". Dickens employs Cockney English in many of his works, denoting working-class Londoners. Cockney grammar appears in terms such as ain't, and consonants in words are frequently omitted, as in 'ere (here) and wot (what). An example of this usage is in Oliver Twist. The Artful Dodger uses cockney slang which is juxtaposed with Oliver's 'proper' English, when the Dodger repeats Oliver saying "seven" with "sivin".

=== Characters ===
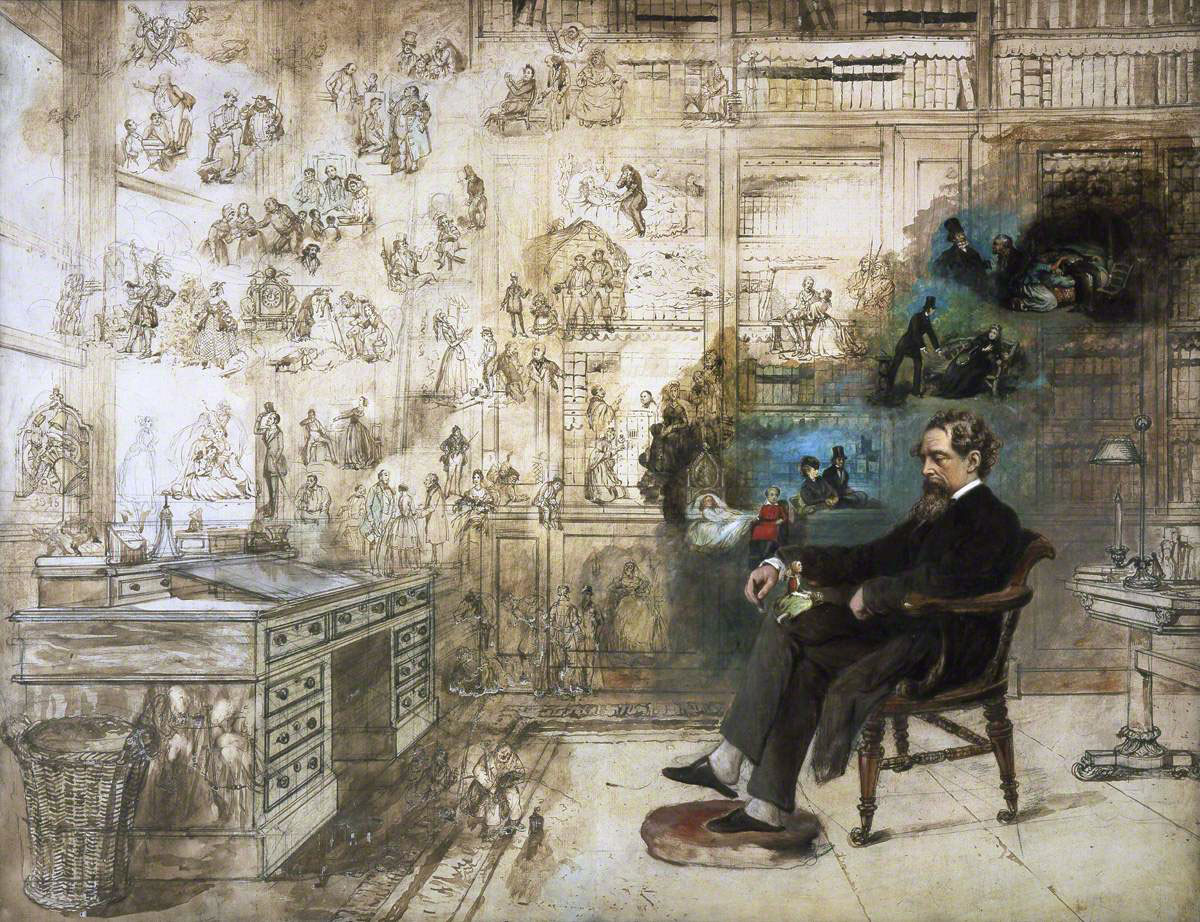
Dickens's Dream by Robert William Buss, portraying Dickens at his desk at Gads Hill Place surrounded by many of his characters

Dickens's biographer Claire Tomalin regards him as the greatest creator of characters in English fiction after Shakespeare. Dickensian characters are amongst the most memorable in English literature, especially so because of their typically whimsical names. The likes of Ebenezer Scrooge, Tiny Tim, Jacob Marley and Bob Cratchit (A Christmas Carol); Oliver Twist, The Artful Dodger, Fagin and Bill Sikes (Oliver Twist); Pip, Miss Havisham, Estella and Abel Magwitch (Great Expectations); Sydney Carton, Charles Darnay and Madame Defarge (A Tale of Two Cities); David Copperfield, Uriah Heep and Mr Micawber (David Copperfield); Daniel Quilp and Nell Trent (The Old Curiosity Shop), Samuel Pickwick and Sam Weller (The Pickwick Papers); and Wackford Squeers (Nicholas Nickleby) are so well known as to be part and parcel of popular culture, and in some cases have passed into ordinary language: a scrooge, for example, is a miser or someone who dislikes Christmas festivity.

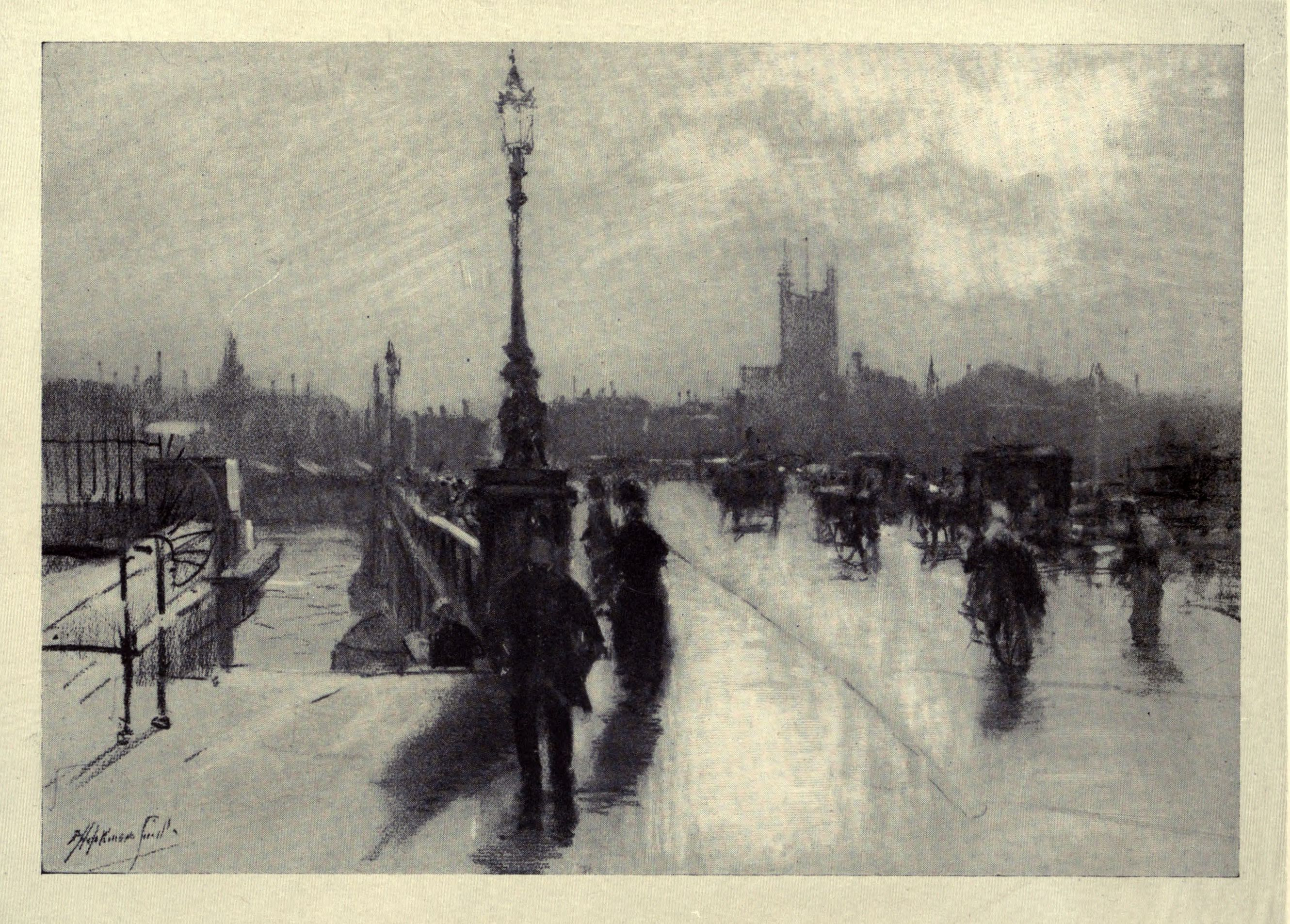
Illustration of London Bridge (from the 1914 book In Dickens's London) which Nancy crossed in Oliver Twist

His characters were often so memorable that they took on a life of their own outside his books. "Gamp" became a slang expression for an unwieldy umbrella from the character Mrs Gamp because she always carries one, and "Pickwickian", "Pecksniffian" and "Gradgrind" all entered dictionaries due to Dickens's original portraits of such characters who were, respectively, quixotic, hypocritical and vapidly factual. Sam Weller, the character that made Dickens famous, became known for his Wellerisms—one-liners that turn proverbs on their heads.

Many characters were drawn from real life: Mrs Nickleby is based on his mother, although she did not recognise herself in the portrait, just as Mr Micawber is constructed from aspects of his father's 'rhetorical exuberance'; Harold Skimpole in Bleak House is based on Leigh Hunt; his wife's dwarfish chiropodist recognised herself in Miss Mowcher in David Copperfield. Perhaps Dickens's impressions on his meeting with Hans Christian Andersen informed the delineation of Uriah Heep (a term synonymous with sycophant).

Virginia Woolf maintained that "we remodel our psychological geography when we read Dickens" as he produces "characters who exist not in detail, not accurately or exactly, but abundantly in a cluster of wild yet extraordinarily revealing remarks". T. S. Eliot wrote that Dickens "excelled in character; in the creation of characters of greater intensity than human beings". One "character" vividly drawn throughout his novels is London itself. Dickens described London as a magic lantern, inspiring the places and people in many of his novels. From the coaching inns on the outskirts of the city to the lower reaches of the Thames, all aspects of the capital—Dickens's London—are described over the course of his body of work. Walking the streets (particularly around London) formed an integral part of his writing life, stoking his creativity. Dickens was known to regularly walk at least a dozen miles (19 km) per day, and once wrote, "If I couldn't walk fast and far, I should just explode and perish."

=== Autobiographical elements ===
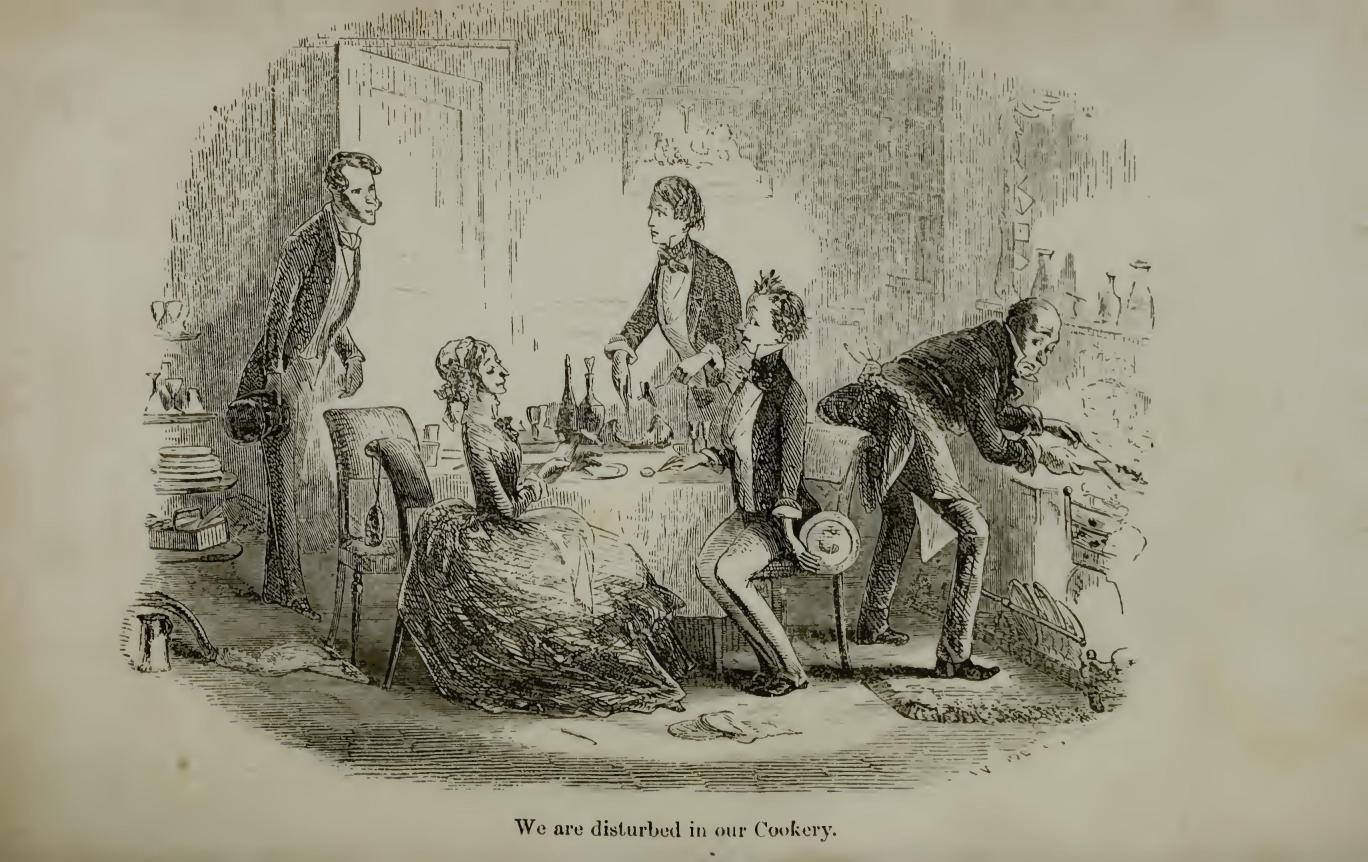
An original illustration by Phiz from the novel David Copperfield, which is widely regarded as Dickens's most autobiographical work

Authors frequently draw their portraits of characters from people they have known in real life. David Copperfield is regarded by many as a veiled autobiography of Dickens. The scenes of interminable court cases and legal arguments in Bleak House reflect Dickens's experiences as a law clerk and court reporter, and in particular his direct experience of the law's procedural delay during 1844 when he sued publishers in Chancery for breach of copyright. Dickens's father was sent to prison for debt, and this became a common theme in many of his books, with the detailed depiction of life in the Marshalsea prison in Little Dorrit resulting from Dickens's own experiences of the institution. Lucy Stroughill, a childhood sweetheart, may have affected several of Dickens's portraits of girls such as Little Em'ly in David Copperfield and Lucie Manette in A Tale of Two Cities. (Note: Slater also detects Ellen Ternan in the portrayal of Lucie Manette.)

Dickens may have drawn on his childhood experiences, but he was also ashamed of them and would not reveal that this was where he gathered his realistic accounts of squalor. Very few knew the details of his early life until six years after his death, when John Forster published a biography on which Dickens had collaborated. Though Skimpole brutally sends up Leigh Hunt, some critics have detected in his portrait features of Dickens's own character, which he sought to exorcise by self-parody.

=== Episodic writing ===
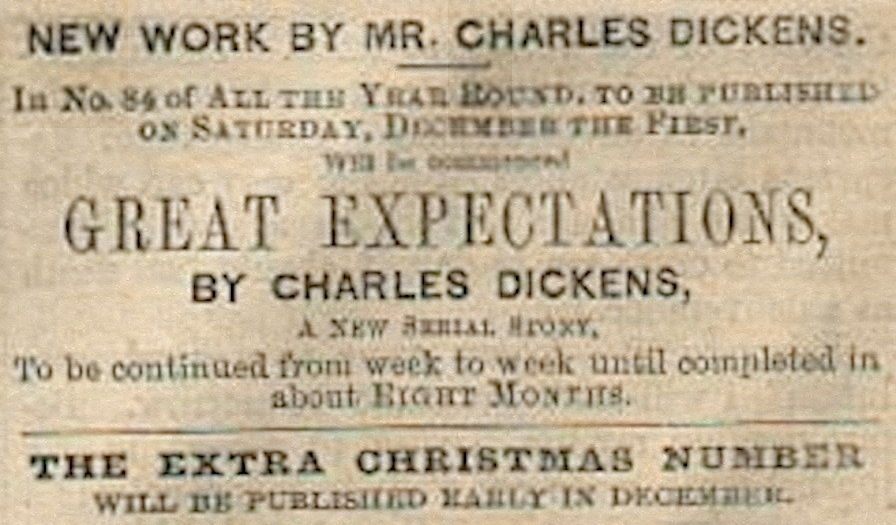
Advertisement for Great Expectations, serialised in the weekly literary magazine All the Year Round from December 1860 to August 1861. The advert contains the plot device "to be continued".

A pioneer of the serial publication of narrative fiction, Dickens wrote most of his major novels in monthly or weekly instalments in journals such as Master Humphrey's Clock and Household Words, later reprinted in book form. These instalments made the stories affordable and accessible, with the audience more evenly distributed across income levels than before. His instalment format inspired a narrative that he would explore and develop throughout his career, and the regular cliffhangers made each new episode widely anticipated. When The Old Curiosity Shop was being serialised, American fans waited at the docks in New York harbour, shouting out to the crew of an incoming British ship, "Is little Nell dead?" Dickens was able to incorporate this episodic writing style but still end up with a coherent novel at the end. He wrote, "The thing has to be planned for presentation in these fragments, and yet for afterwards fusing together as an uninterrupted whole."

Another important impact of Dickens's episodic writing style resulted from his exposure to the opinions of his readers and friends. His friend Forster had a significant hand in reviewing his drafts, an influence that went beyond matters of punctuation; he toned down melodramatic and sensationalist exaggerations, cut long passages (such as the episode of Quilp's drowning in The Old Curiosity Shop), and made suggestions about plot and character. It was he who suggested that Charley Bates should be redeemed in Oliver Twist. Dickens had not thought of killing Little Nell and it was Forster who advised him to entertain this possibility as necessary to his conception of the heroine. When in 1863 the Jewish English reader Eliza Davis wrote to rebuke him for having "encouraged a vile prejudice against the despised Hebrew" with the character of Fagin in Oliver Twist, Dickens halted the second printing of the novel and made some changes to the original 1837 text. He also created a group of sympathetic Jewish characters in his next novel, Our Mutual Friend, published 1864–1865.

At the helm in popularising cliffhangers and serial publications in Victorian literature, Dickens's influence can also be seen in television soap operas and film series, with The Guardian stating that "the DNA of Dickens's busy, episodic storytelling, delivered in instalments and rife with cliffhangers and diversions, is traceable in everything." His serialisation of his novels also drew comments from other writers. In the Scottish author Robert Louis Stevenson's novel The Wrecker, Captain Nares, investigating an abandoned ship, remarked: "See! They were writing up the log," said Nares, pointing to the ink-bottle. "Caught napping, as usual. I wonder if there ever was a captain yet that lost a ship with his log-book up to date? He generally has about a month to fill up on a clean break, like Charles Dickens and his serial novels."

=== Social commentary ===
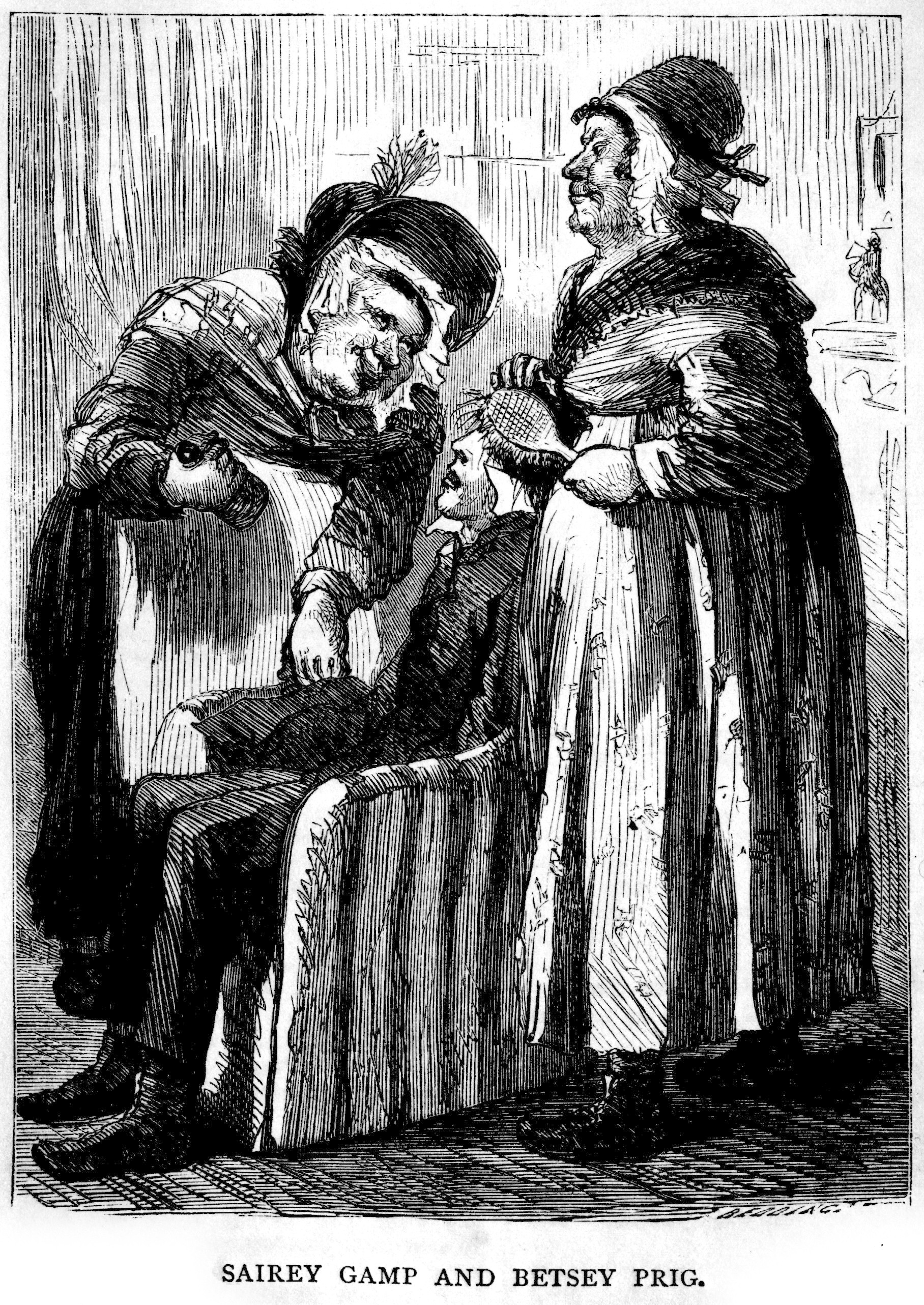
Sarah Gamp (left) from Martin Chuzzlewit became a stereotype of untrained and incompetent nurses of the early Victorian era, before the reforms of Florence Nightingale.

Dickens's novels were, among other things, works of social commentary. Simon Callow states, "From the moment he started to write, he spoke for the people, and the people loved him for it." He was a fierce critic of the poverty and social stratification of Victorian society. In a New York address, he expressed his belief that "Virtue shows quite as well in rags and patches as she does in purple and fine linen". Dickens's second novel, Oliver Twist (1839), shocked readers with its images of poverty and crime: it challenged middle class polemics about criminals, making impossible any pretence to ignorance about what poverty entailed. Today, Dickensian is a term applied to insanitary social conditions or grim institutions akin to those denounced by Dickens in his work, with the Oxford professor Peter Conrad writing, "Dickens, like Banksy, writes blackly prophetic graffiti on the wall."

At a time when Britain was the major economic and political power of the world, Dickens highlighted the life of the forgotten poor and disadvantaged within society. Through his journalism he campaigned on specific issues—such as sanitation and the workhouse—but his fiction probably demonstrated its greatest prowess in changing public opinion in regard to class inequalities. He often depicted the exploitation and oppression of the poor and condemned the public officials and institutions that not only allowed such abuses to exist, but flourished as a result. His most strident indictment of this condition is in Hard Times (1854), Dickens's only novel-length treatment of the industrial working class. In this work, he uses vitriol and satire to illustrate how this marginalised social stratum was termed "Hands" by the factory owners; that is, not really "people" but rather only appendages of the machines they operated. His writings inspired others, in particular journalists and political figures, to address such problems of class oppression. For example, the prison scenes in The Pickwick Papers are claimed to have been influential in having the Fleet Prison shut down. Karl Marx asserted that Dickens "issued to the world more political and social truths than have been uttered by all the professional politicians, publicists and moralists put together". George Bernard Shaw even remarked that Great Expectations was more seditious than Marx's Das Kapital. The exceptional popularity of Dickens's novels, even those with socially oppositional themes (Bleak House, 1853; Little Dorrit, 1857; Our Mutual Friend, 1865), not only underscored his ability to create compelling storylines and unforgettable characters, but also ensured that the Victorian public confronted issues of social justice that had commonly been ignored. Bleak House, a satire of protracted legal cases with Jarndyce and Jarndyce—a fictional long-running Chancery case which has been cited by courts as a symbol of a legal case that interminably drags on—the central plot of the novel, helped support a judicial reform movement that culminated in the enactment of legal reform in England in the 1870s.

It has been argued that his technique of flooding his narratives with an 'unruly superfluity of material' that, in the gradual dénouement, yields up an unsuspected order, influenced the organisation of Charles Darwin's On the Origin of Species.

=== Literary techniques ===
Dickens is often described as using idealised characters and highly sentimental scenes to contrast with his caricatures and the ugly social truths he reveals. The story of Nell Trent in The Old Curiosity Shop (1841) was received as extremely moving by contemporary readers but viewed as ludicrously sentimental by Oscar Wilde. "One must have a heart of stone to read the death of little Nell", he said in a famous remark, "without dissolving into tears ... of laughter." G. K. Chesterton stated, "It is not the death of little Nell, but the life of little Nell, that I object to", arguing that the maudlin effect of his description of her life owed much to the gregarious nature of Dickens's grief, his "despotic" use of people's feelings to move them to tears in works like this.

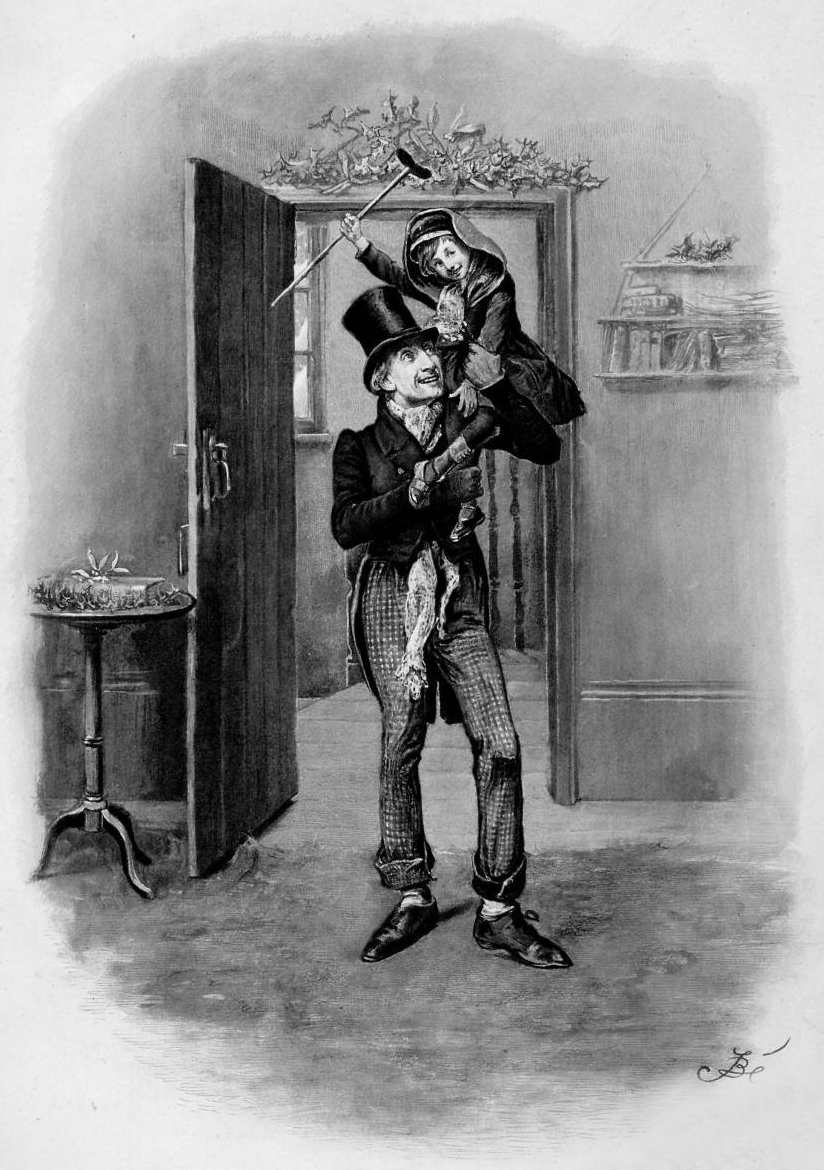
Unfortunate characters, such as Tiny Tim (held aloft by Bob Cratchit), are often used by Dickens in sentimental ways.

The question as to whether Dickens belongs to the tradition of the sentimental novel is debatable. Valerie Purton, in her book Dickens and the Sentimental Tradition, sees him continuing aspects of this tradition, and argues that his "sentimental scenes and characters [are] as crucial to the overall power of the novels as his darker or comic figures and scenes", and that "Dombey and Son is [ ... ] Dickens's greatest triumph in the sentimentalist tradition". The Encyclopædia Britannica online comments that, despite "patches of emotional excess", such as the reported death of Tiny Tim in A Christmas Carol (1843), "Dickens cannot really be termed a sentimental novelist".

In Oliver Twist, Dickens provides readers with an idealised portrait of a boy so inherently and unrealistically good that his values are never subverted by either brutal orphanages or coerced involvement in a gang of young pickpockets. While later novels also centre on idealised characters (Esther Summerson in Bleak House and Amy Dorrit in Little Dorrit), this idealism serves only to highlight Dickens's goal of poignant social commentary. Dickens's fiction, reflecting what he believed to be true of his own life, makes frequent use of coincidence, either for comic effect or to emphasise the idea of providence. For example, Oliver Twist turns out to be the lost nephew of the upper-class family that rescues him from the dangers of the pickpocket group. Such coincidences are a staple of 18th-century picaresque novels, such as Henry Fielding's Tom Jones, which Dickens enjoyed reading as a youth.

== Reputation ==
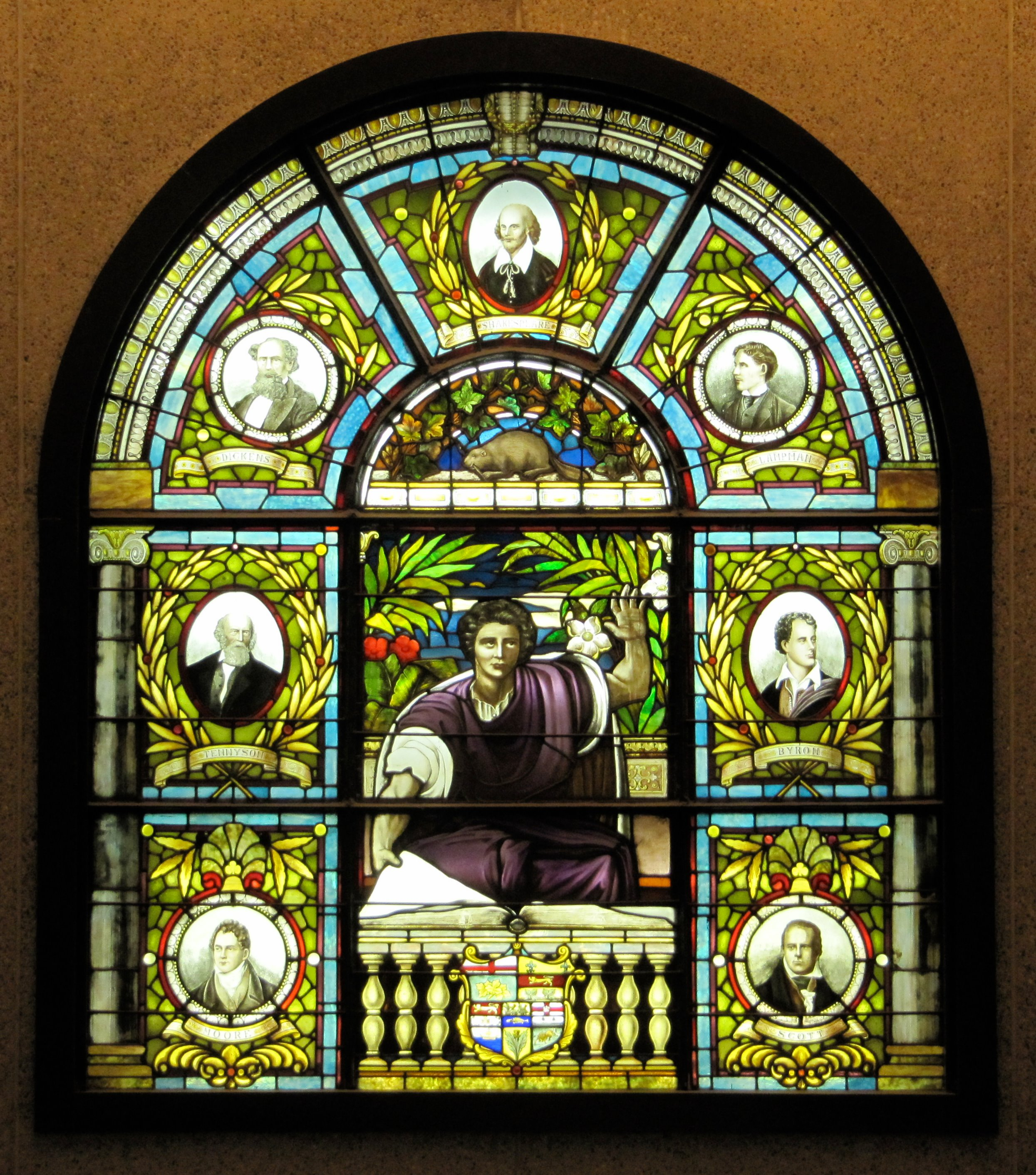
Dickens's portrait (top left), in between Shakespeare and Tennyson, on a stained glass window at the Ottawa Public Library, Ottawa, Canada

Dickens was the most popular novelist of his time, and remains one of the best-known and most-read of English authors. His works have never gone out of print, and have been adapted continually for the screen since the invention of cinema, with at least 200 motion pictures and television adaptations based on Dickens's works documented. Many of his works were adapted for the stage during his own lifetime—early productions included A Christmas Carol; or, Past, Present, and Future in 1844, staged within weeks of the novella's publication, with Dickens appearing at several stage rehearsals during which he made suggestions, and The Haunted Man in 1848, both of which were performed at the Adelphi Theatre in the West End—and, as early as 1901, the British silent film Scrooge, or, Marley's Ghost was made by Walter R. Booth. Contemporaries such as the publisher Edward Lloyd cashed in on Dickens's popularity with cheap imitations of his novels, resulting in his own popular 'penny dreadfuls'.

Dickens created some of the world's best-known fictional characters and is regarded by many as the greatest British novelist of the Victorian era. From the beginning of his career in the 1830s, his achievements in English literature were compared to those of Shakespeare. Dickens's literary reputation, however, began to decline with the publication of Bleak House in 1852–53. Philip Collins calls Bleak House "a crucial item in the history of Dickens's reputation". Reviewers and literary figures during the 1850s, 1860s and 1870s, saw a "drear decline" in Dickens, from a writer of "bright sunny comedy ... to dark and serious social commentary". The Spectator called Bleak House "a heavy book to read through at once ... dull and wearisome as a serial"; Richard Simpson, in The Rambler, characterised Hard Times as "this dreary framework"; Fraser's Magazine thought Little Dorrit "decidedly the worst of his novels". All the same, despite these "increasing reservations amongst reviewers and the chattering classes, 'the public never deserted its favourite'". Dickens's popular reputation remained unchanged, sales continued to rise, and Household Words and later All the Year Round were highly successful.

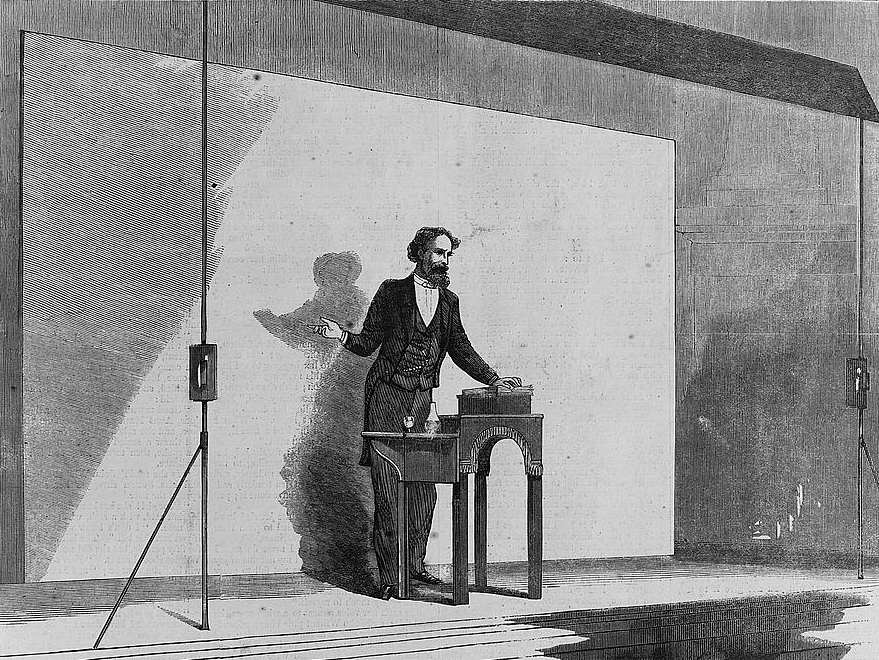
"Charles Dickens as he appears when reading." Wood engraving from Harper's Weekly, 7 December 1867.

As his career progressed, Dickens's fame and the demand for his public readings were unparalleled. In 1868, The Times wrote, "Amid all the variety of 'readings', those of Mr Charles Dickens stand alone." A Dickens biographer, Edgar Johnson, wrote: "It was [always] more than a reading; it was an extraordinary exhibition of acting that seized upon its auditors with a mesmeric possession." The author David Lodge called him the "first writer to be an object of unrelenting public interest and adulation". Juliet John backed the claim for Dickens "to be called the first self-made global media star of the age of mass culture". The word "celebrity" first appeared in the Oxford English Dictionary in 1851, and the BBC states "Charles Dickens was one of the first figures to be called one". Comparing his reception at public readings to those of a contemporary pop star—the BBC compared his reception in the US to the Beatles—The Guardian states, "People sometimes fainted at his shows. His performances even saw the rise of that modern phenomenon, the 'speculator' or ticket tout (scalpers)—the ones in New York City escaped detection by borrowing respectable-looking hats from the waiters in nearby restaurants."

"Dickens's vocal impersonations of his own characters gave this truth a theatrical form: the public reading tour. No other Victorian could match him for celebrity, earnings, and sheer vocal artistry. The Victorians craved the author's multiple voices: between 1853 and his death in 1870, Dickens performed about 470 times."

— Peter Garratt in The Guardian on Dickens's fame and the demand for his public readings

Among fellow writers, there was a range of opinions on Dickens. William Wordsworth thought him a "very talkative, vulgar young person", adding he had not read a line of his work, while the novelist George Meredith (1828–1909) found Dickens "intellectually lacking". In 1888 Leslie Stephen commented in the Dictionary of National Biography that "if literary fame could be safely measured by popularity with the half-educated, Dickens must claim the highest position among English novelists". Anthony Trollope's Autobiography famously declared Thackeray, not Dickens, to be the greatest novelist of the age. However, both Leo Tolstoy and Fyodor Dostoyevsky were admirers. Dostoyevsky commented: "We understand Dickens in Russia, I am convinced, almost as well as the English, perhaps even with all the nuances. It may well be that we love him no less than his compatriots do. And yet how original is Dickens, and how very English!" Tolstoy referred to David Copperfield as his favourite book, and he later adopted the novel as "a model for his own autobiographical reflections". The French writer Jules Verne called Dickens his favourite writer, writing his novels "stand alone, dwarfing all others by their amazing power and felicity of expression". Dutch painter Vincent van Gogh was inspired by Dickens's novels in several of his paintings, such as Vincent's Chair, and in an 1889 letter to his sister stated that reading Dickens, especially A Christmas Carol, was one of the things that was keeping him from committing suicide. Oscar Wilde generally disparaged his depiction of character, while admiring his gift for caricature. Henry James denied him a premier position, calling him "the greatest of superficial novelists": Dickens failed to endow his characters with psychological depth, and the novels, "loose baggy monsters", betrayed a "cavalier organisation". Joseph Conrad described his own childhood in bleak Dickensian terms, noting he had "an intense and unreasoning affection" for Bleak House dating back to his boyhood. The novel influenced his own gloomy portrait of London in The Secret Agent (1907). Virginia Woolf had a love-hate relationship with Dickens, finding his novels "mesmerizing" while reproving him for his sentimentalism and a commonplace style.

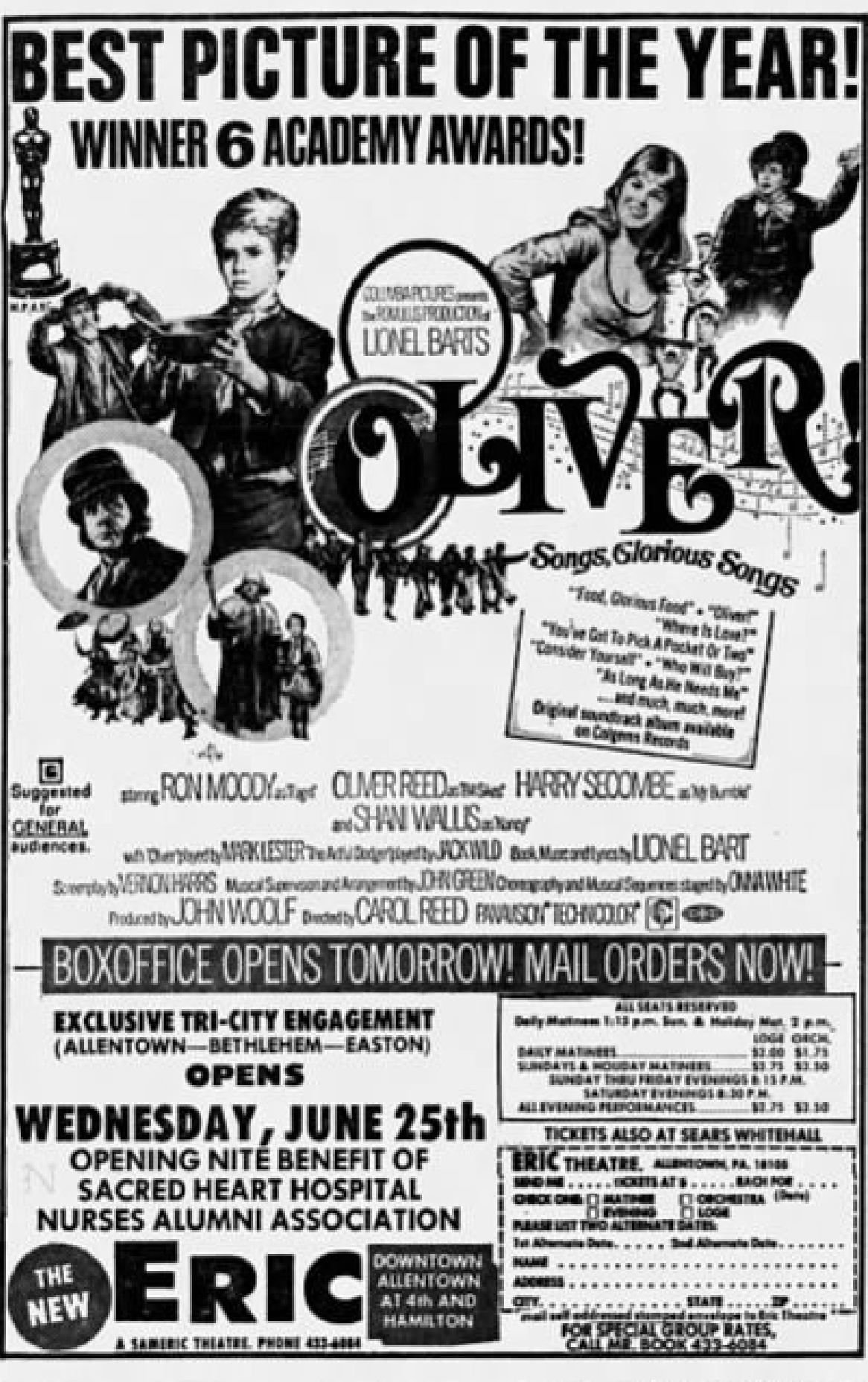
Advert for the Best Picture Oscar winner Oliver! (1968), an adaptation of Oliver Twist and one of over 200 works based on Dickens's novels

Around 1940–41, the attitude of the literary critics began to warm towards Dickens—led by George Orwell in Inside the Whale and Other Essays (March 1940), Edmund Wilson in The Wound and the Bow (1941) and Humphry House in Dickens and His World. However, even in 1948, F. R. Leavis, in The Great Tradition, asserted that "the adult mind doesn't as a rule find in Dickens a challenge to an unusual and sustained seriousness"; Dickens was indeed a great genius, "but the genius was that of a great entertainer", though he later changed his opinion with Dickens the Novelist (1970, with Q. D. (Queenie) Leavis): "Our purpose", they wrote, "is to enforce as unanswerably as possible the conviction that Dickens was one of the greatest of creative writers". In 1944 the Soviet film director Sergei Eisenstein wrote an essay on Dickens's influence on cinema, such as cross-cutting—where two stories run alongside each other, as seen in novels such as Oliver Twist.

In the 1950s, "a substantial reassessment and re-editing of the works began, and critics found his finest artistry and greatest depth to be in the later novels: Bleak House, Little Dorrit and Great Expectations—and (less unanimously) in Hard Times and Our Mutual Friend". Dickens was among the favourite authors of the best-selling children's author Roald Dahl who would include three of Dickens's novels among those read by the title character in his 1988 novel Matilda. In 2005, Paul McCartney, an avid reader of Dickens, named Nicholas Nickleby his favourite novel. On Dickens he states, "I like the world that he takes me to. I like his words; I like the language", adding, "A lot of my stuff—it's kind of Dickensian." The screenwriter Jonathan Nolan's screenplay for The Dark Knight Rises (2012) was inspired by A Tale of Two Cities, with Nolan calling the depiction of Paris in the novel "one of the most harrowing portraits of a relatable, recognisable civilisation that completely folded to pieces". On 7 February 2012, the 200th anniversary of Dickens's birth, Philip Womack wrote in The Telegraph: "Today there is no escaping Charles Dickens. Not that there has ever been much chance of that before. He has a deep, peculiar hold upon us".

== Legacy ==
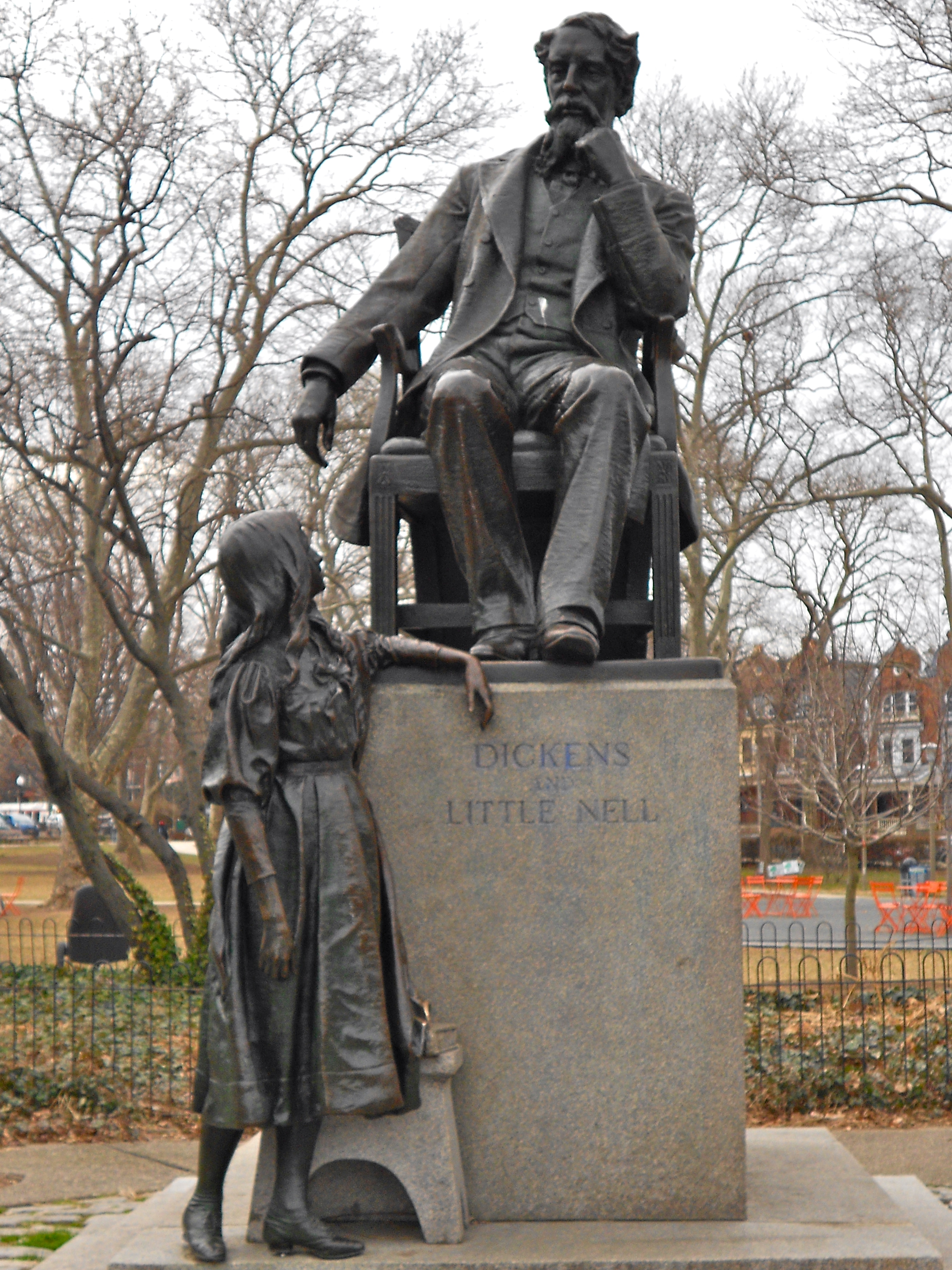
Dickens and Little Nell statue in Philadelphia, Pennsylvania

Dickens is credited as one of the 528 original Founding Members of the London Library, alongside Thomas Carlyle, John Forster, and others. He was also a committee member of the Library in its early years, from 1846-1847.

Museums and festivals celebrating Dickens's life and works exist in many places with which Dickens was associated. These include the Charles Dickens Museum in London, the historic home where he wrote Oliver Twist, The Pickwick Papers and Nicholas Nickleby; and the Charles Dickens' Birthplace Museum in Portsmouth, the house in which he was born. The original manuscripts of many of his novels, as well as printers' proofs, first editions and illustrations from the collection of Dickens's friend John Forster are held at the Victoria and Albert Museum. Dickens's will stipulated that no memorial be erected in his honour—"I conjure to my friends on no account to make me the subject of any monument, memorial or testimonial whatsoever. I rest my claims to the remembrance of my country upon my published works". Nonetheless, a life-size bronze statue of Dickens entitled Dickens and Little Nell, cast in 1890 by Francis Edwin Elwell, stands in Clark Park in the Spruce Hill neighbourhood of Philadelphia, United States. Another life-size statue of Dickens is located at Centennial Park in Sydney, Australia. In 1960 a bas-relief sculpture of Dickens, notably featuring characters from his books, was commissioned from the sculptor Estcourt J Clack to adorn the office building built on the site of his former home at 1 Devonshire Terrace, London. In 2014, a life-size statue was unveiled near his birthplace in Portsmouth on the 202nd anniversary of his birth; this was supported by his great-great-grandsons, Ian and Gerald Dickens.

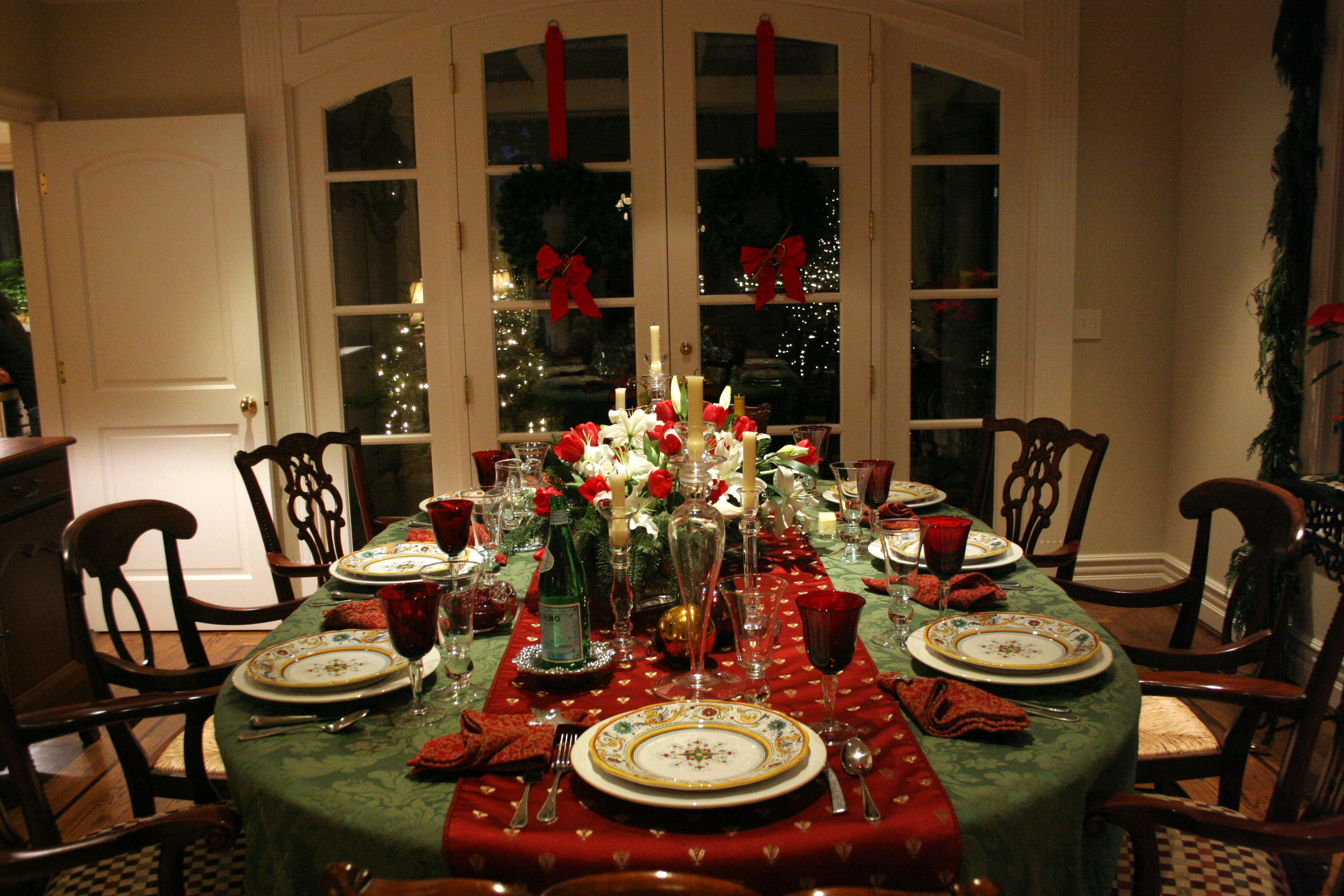
A Christmas Carol significantly influenced the modern celebration of Christmas in many countries.

A Christmas Carol is most probably his best-known story, with frequent new adaptations. It is also the most-filmed of Dickens's stories, with many versions dating from the early years of cinema. According to the historian Ronald Hutton the current state of the observance of Christmas is largely the result of a mid-Victorian revival of the holiday spearheaded by A Christmas Carol. Dickens catalysed the emerging Christmas as a family-centred festival of generosity, in contrast to the dwindling community-based and church-centred observations, as new middle-class expectations arose. Its archetypal figures (Scrooge, Tiny Tim, the Christmas ghosts) entered into Western cultural consciousness. "Merry Christmas", a prominent phrase from the tale, was popularised following the appearance of the story. The term Scrooge became a synonym for miser, and his exclamation "Bah! Humbug!'", a dismissal of the festive spirit, likewise gained currency as an idiom. The Victorian-era novelist William Makepeace Thackeray called the book "a national benefit, and to every man and woman who reads it a personal kindness".

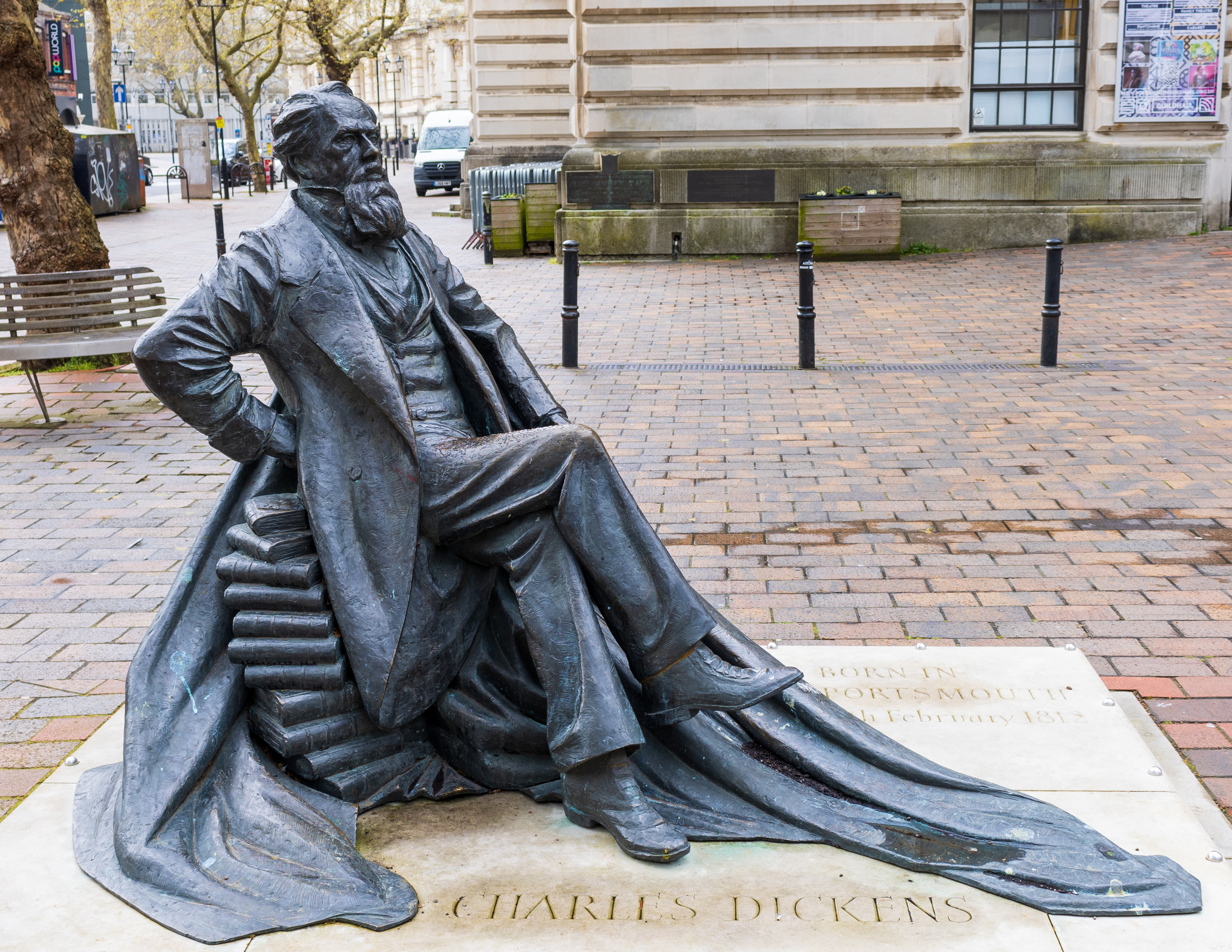
A statue of Dickens in his birthplace Portsmouth, Hampshire

Dickens was commemorated on the £10 note issued by the Bank of England that circulated between 1992 and 2003. His portrait appeared on the reverse of the note accompanied by a scene from The Pickwick Papers. The Charles Dickens School is a high school in Broadstairs, Kent. A theme park, Dickens World, was open in Chatham from 2007 to 2016. To celebrate the 200th anniversary of his birth in 2012, the Museum of London held the UK's first major exhibition on the author in 40 years. From September 2011 to February 2012, the Morgan Library & Museum in New York celebrated him with its exhibition Charles Dickens at 200 with manuscripts, photographs, and original illustrations.

In 2002 Dickens was number 41 in the BBC's poll of the 100 Greatest Britons. American literary critic Harold Bloom placed Dickens among the greatest Western writers of all time. In the 2003 UK survey The Big Read carried out by the BBC, five of Dickens's books were named in the Top 100.

Actors who have portrayed Dickens on screen include Anthony Hopkins, Derek Jacobi, Simon Callow, Dan Stevens and Ralph Fiennes, the latter playing him in The Invisible Woman (2013) which depicts Dickens's alleged secret love affair with Ellen Ternan which lasted for thirteen years until his death in 1870.

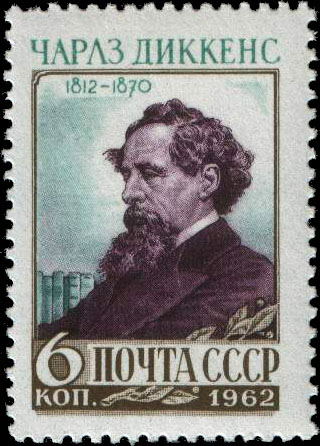
A Soviet postage stamp commemorating Dickens

Dickens and his publications have appeared on a number of postage stamps in countries including: the United Kingdom (1970, 1993, 2011 and 2012 issued by the Royal Mail—their 2012 collection marked the bicentenary of Dickens's birth), the Soviet Union (1962), Antigua, Barbuda, Botswana, Cameroon, Dubai, Fujairah, Saint Lucia and the Turks and Caicos Islands (1970), Saint Vincent (1987), Nevis (2007), Alderney, Gibraltar, Jersey and Pitcairn Islands (2012), Austria (2013) and Mozambique (2014). In 1976 a crater on the planet Mercury was named in his honour.

In November 2018 it was reported that a previously lost portrait of a 31-year-old Dickens, by Margaret Gillies, had been found in Pietermaritzburg, South Africa. Gillies was an early supporter of women's suffrage and had painted the portrait in late 1843 when Dickens, aged 31, wrote A Christmas Carol. It was exhibited, to acclaim, at the Royal Academy of Arts in 1844. The Charles Dickens Museum is reported to have paid £180,000 for the portrait.

== Works ==
Dickens published 15 major novels, several novellas, a large number of short stories (including a number of Christmas-themed stories), a handful of plays and several non-fiction books.

=== Novels and novellas ===
Most of Dickens's work was initially published in serial form, either weekly in magazines or monthly in free-standing instalments, then reprinted in standard book formats.

- The Pickwick Papers (The Posthumous Papers of the Pickwick Club; monthly serial, April 1836 to November 1837). Novel.
- Oliver Twist (The Adventures of Oliver Twist; monthly serial in Bentley's Miscellany, February 1837 to April 1839). Novel.
- Nicholas Nickleby (The Life and Adventures of Nicholas Nickleby; monthly serial, April 1838 to October 1839). Novel.
- The Old Curiosity Shop (weekly serial in Master Humphrey's Clock, April 1840 to November 1841). Novel.
- Barnaby Rudge (Barnaby Rudge: A Tale of the Riots of Eighty; weekly serial in Master Humphrey's Clock, February to November 1841). Novel.
- Martin Chuzzlewit (The Life and Adventures of Martin Chuzzlewit; monthly serial, January 1843 to July 1844). Novel.
- A Christmas Carol (A Christmas Carol in Prose: Being a Ghost-story of Christmas; 1843). Novella.
- The Chimes (The Chimes: A Goblin Story of Some Bells That Rang an Old Year Out and a New Year In; 1844). Novella.
- The Cricket on the Hearth (The Cricket on the Hearth: A Fairy Tale of Home; 1845). Novella.
- Dombey and Son (Dealings with the Firm of Dombey and Son: Wholesale, Retail and for Exportation; monthly serial, October 1846 to April 1848). Novel.
- The Battle of Life (The Battle of Life: A Love Story; 1846). Novella.
- The Haunted Man (The Haunted Man and the Ghost's Bargain: A Fancy for Christmas-time; 1848). Novella.
- David Copperfield (The Personal History, Adventures, Experience and Observation of David Copperfield the Younger of Blunderstone Rookery [Which He Never Meant to Publish on Any Account]; monthly serial, May 1849 to November 1850). Novel.
- Bleak House (monthly serial, March 1852 to September 1853). Novel.
- Hard Times (Hard Times: For These Times; weekly serial in Household Words, 1 April 1854, to 12 August 1854). Novel.
- Little Dorrit (monthly serial, December 1855 to June 1857). Novel.
- A Tale of Two Cities (weekly serial in All the Year Round, 30 April 1859, to 26 November 1859). Novel.
- Great Expectations (weekly serial in All the Year Round, 1 December 1860 to 3 August 1861). Novel.
- Our Mutual Friend (monthly serial, May 1864 to November 1865). Novel.
- The Mystery of Edwin Drood (monthly serial, April 1870 to September 1870). Novel. Left unfinished due to Dickens's death.

== See also ==
- Charles Dickens bibliography
- List of Dickensian characters
- Depiction of contemporary England in Dickens' Dombey and Son
- Racism in the work of Charles Dickens

== Sources ==
- Ackroyd, Peter (1990). Dickens. London: Sinclair-Stevenson. ISBN 978-1-85619-000-8. Archived from the original on 26 September 2015.
- Atkinson, Paul (1990). The Ethnographic Imagination: Textual Constructions of Reality. London: Routledge. p. 48. ISBN 978-0-415-01761-9.
- Bidwell, Walter Hilliard, ed. (July–December 1870). "The Eclectic Magazine: Foreign Literature". Eclectic Magazine: Foreign Literature, Science and Art. New Series (Charles Dickens Obituary). 12: 222–224. Archived from the original on 8 October 2015.
- Black, Joseph Laurence (2007). "Charles Dickens". In Black, Joseph Laurence (ed.). The age of romanticism. The Victorian era. The twentieth century and beyond. The Broadview Anthology of British Literature. Vol. 2. Broadview Press. pp. 735–743. ISBN 978-1-55111-869-7. Archived from the original on 19 November 2016.
- Bodenheimer, Rosemarie (2011). "London in the Victorian Novel". In Manley, Lawrence (ed.). The Cambridge Companion to the Literature of London. Cambridge University Press. pp. 142–159. ISBN 978-0-521-72231-5. Archived from the original on 19 November 2016.
- Bowen, John (2019). "Madness and the Dickens Marriage: a New Source". The Dickensian. 115 (507): 5–20.
- Cain, Lynn (2008). Dickens, family, authorship: psychoanalytic perspectives on kinship and creativity. Ashgate Publishing. ISBN 978-0-7546-6180-1. Archived from the original on 18 October 2015.
- Callow, Simon (2012). Charles Dickens and the Great Theatre of the World. Vintage. ISBN 978-0-345-80323-8.
- Callow, Simon (2009). Dickens's Christmas: A Victorian Celebration. Frances Lincoln Ltd. ISBN 978-0-7112-3031-6. Archived from the original on 19 September 2015.
- Chesterton, G.K. (2005) [1906]. Charles Dickens: A Critical Study. Kessinger Publishing. ISBN 978-1-4179-1996-3. Archived from the original on 19 November 2016.
- Chesterton, G.K. (1911). Appreciations and Criticisms of the Works of Charles Dickens. J M Dent. p. 54.
- Cochrane, Robertson (1996). Wordplay: origins, meanings, and usage of the English language. University of Toronto Press. ISBN 978-0-8020-7752-3.
- Cohen, Jane R. (1980). Charles Dickens and His Original Illustrators. Ohio State University Press. ISBN 978-0-8142-0284-5. Archived from the original on 20 September 2015.
- Colledge, Gary L. (2009). God and Charles Dickens. Baker Books. ISBN 978-1-4412-3778-1. Archived from the original on 22 September 2015.
- Davis, Paul (1998). Charles Dickens A to Z. Facts on File, Inc. ISBN 978-0-8160-2905-1.
- Hartley, Jenny (2009). Charles Dickens and The House of Fallen Women. London: Methuen. ISBN 978-0-413-77643-3. Archived from the original on 8 October 2015.
- Morrison, Richard (3 February 2012). "Champion of the little people". The Australian. Archived from the original on 2 February 2012.
- Davies, James A (1983). John Forster, a Literary Life. Rowman & Littlefield. ISBN 978-0-389-20391-9. Archived from the original on 19 November 2016.
- Dickens, Henry Fielding (1934). The Recollections of Sir Henry Fielding Dickens, KC. William Heinemann Ltd.
- Ellmann, Richard (1988) [1987]. Oscar Wilde. London: Penguin Books. ISBN 978-0-14-009661-3.
- Flint, Kate (2001). "The middle novels: Chuzzlewit, Dombey and Copperfield". In Jordan, John O (ed.). The Cambridge Companion to Charles Dickens. Cambridge University Press. ISBN 978-0-521-66964-1.
- Forster, John (2006) [1872–1874]. Life of Charles Dickens. London: Diderot Publishing. ISBN 978-90-77932-03-2. Archived from the original on 21 September 2015.
- Foxcroft, Louise (2007). The Making of Addiction: The 'Use and Abuse' of Opium in Nineteenth-Century Britain. Ashgate Publishing. ISBN 978-0-7546-5633-3. Archived from the original on 30 October 2015.
- Furneaux, Holly (2011). "Childhood". In Ledger, Sally; Furneaux, Holly (eds.). Dickens in Context. Cambridge University Press. pp. 186–193. ISBN 978-0-521-88700-7. Archived from the original on 25 October 2015.
- Glancy, Ruth (1999). Student Companion to Charles Dickens. Westport, Connecticut: Greenwood Publishing Company. ISBN 978-0-313-30611-2. Archived from the original on 20 September 2015.
- Grossman, Jonathan H (2012). Charles Dickens's Networks: Public Transport and the Novel. Oxford: Oxford University Press. ISBN 978-0-19-964419-3. Archived from the original on 19 November 2016.
- Hardwick, Michael; Hardwick, Mollie (1973). The Charles Dickens Encyclopedia. Ware, UK: Wordsworth. ISBN 1853269727.
- Hauser, Arnold (1999) [1951]. The Social History of Art: Naturalism, impressionism, the film age. Vol. 4. London: Routledge. ISBN 978-0-415-19948-3. Archived from the original on 17 October 2015.
- Hawes, Donald (1998). Who's Who in Dickens. Psychology Press. ISBN 978-0-415-13604-4. Archived from the original on 20 September 2015.
- Henson, Louise (2004). "'In the Natural Course of Physical Things': Ghosts and Science in Charles Dickens's All the Year Round". In Henson, Louise; Cantor, Geoffrey; Dawson, Gowan; Noakes, Richard; Shuttleworth, Sally; Topham, Jonathan R (eds.). Culture and Science in the Nineteenth-Century Media. Ashgate Publishing. pp. 113–124. ISBN 978-0-7546-3574-1. Archived from the original on 30 October 2015.
- Hobsbaum, Philip (1998) [1972]. A reader's guide to Charles Dickens. Syracuse University Press. p. 270. ISBN 978-0-8156-0475-4.
- Hughes, William Richard (1891). A week's tramp in Dickens-Land: together with personal reminiscences of the 'Inimitable Boz'. Oxford: Chapman & Hall.
- Hutton, Ronald (2001). The Stations of the Sun: A History of the Ritual Year in Britain. Oxford University Press. ISBN 978-0-19-285448-3. Archived from the original on 22 September 2015.
- Jackson, Kenneth T (1995). The Encyclopedia of New York City. New York Historical Society. ISBN 978-0-300-05536-8.
- Johnson, E D H (1969). Charles Dickens: An Introduction to His Novels. Random House Studies in Language and Literature. Random House. ASIN B0011BLL8W. Archived from the original on 29 June 2019.
- Jones, Richard (2004). Walking Dickensian London. Globetrotter walking guides. London: New Holland Publishers. ISBN 978-1-84330-483-8. Archived from the original on 19 November 2016.
- Jones, Sam (6 February 2012). "Ebenezer Scrooge named most popular Dickens character". The Guardian. Archived from the original on 12 November 2020.
- Kucich, John; Sadoff, Dianne F (2006). "Charles Dickens". In Kastan, David Scott (ed.). The Oxford Encyclopedia of British Literature, Volume. Vol. 1. Oxford University Press. pp. 154–164. ISBN 978-0-19-516921-8. Archived from the original on 19 November 2016.
- Levin, Harry (Autumn 1970). "Charles Dickens (1812–1870)". The American Scholar. 39 (4).
- Lodge, David (2002). Consciousness and the Novel. Harvard, Massachusetts: Harvard University Press. p. 118. ISBN 978-0-674-00949-3.
- Marlow, James E. (1994). Charles Dickens: The Uses of Time. Susquehanna University Press. ISBN 978-0-945636-48-9. Archived from the original on 26 October 2015.
- Mazzeno, Laurence W. (2008). The Dickens industry: critical perspectives 1836–2005. Studies in European and American literature and culture. Literary criticism in perspective. Camden House. ISBN 978-1-57113-317-5. Archived from the original on 23 September 2015.
- Mee, Jon (2010). The Cambridge Introduction to Charles Dickens. Cambridge Introductions to Literature. Cambridge University Press. ISBN 978-0-521-67634-2. Archived from the original on 22 October 2015.
- Moore, Grace (2004). Dickens and Empire:Discourses of Class, Race and Colonialism in the Works of Charles Dickens. Ashgate Publishing. ISBN 978-0-7546-3412-6. Archived from the original on 22 October 2015.
- Nayder, Lillian (2011). The other Dickens: a life of Catherine Hogarth. Cornell University Press. ISBN 978-0-8014-4787-7.
- Nisbet, Ada (1952). Dickens & Ellen Ternan. University of California Press. p. 37.
- Page, Norman (1999). Charles Dickens:Family History. Routledge. ISBN 978-0-415-22233-4. Archived from the original on 30 October 2015.
- Patten, Robert L (2001). "From Sketches to Nickleby". In Jordan, John O (ed.). The Cambridge Companion to Charles Dickens. Cambridge University Press. ISBN 978-0-521-66964-1.
- Polloczek, Dieter (1999). "Aporias of Retribution and questions of responsibility: the legacy of incarceration in Dickens's Bleak House". Literature and Legal Discourse: Equity and Ethics from Sterne to Conrad. Cambridge University Press. pp. 124–201. ISBN 978-0-521-65251-3. Archived from the original on 26 September 2015.
- Pope-Hennessy, Una (1945). Charles Dickens 1812–1870. Chatto and Windus.
- Raina, Badri (1986). Dickens and the Dialectic of Growth. University of Wisconsin Press. p. 25. ISBN 978-0-299-10610-2.
- Robinson, David J. (2005). Disordered personalities (3 ed.). Rapid Psychler Press. ISBN 978-1-894328-09-8. Archived from the original on 20 September 2015.
- Sasaki, Toru (2011). "Modern screen adaptations". In Ledger, Sally; Furneaux, Holly (eds.). Dickens in Context. Cambridge University Press. pp. 67–73. ISBN 978-0-521-88700-7. Archived from the original on 19 September 2015.
- Schlicke, Paul, ed. (1999). Oxford Reader's Companion to Dickens. Oxford University Press. ISBN 978-0-19-866213-6.
- Schlicke, Paul (2011). The Oxford Companion to Charles Dickens (Anniversary ed.). Oxford University Press. ISBN 978-0199640188.
- Slater, Michael (1983). Dickens and Women. Stanford University Press. ISBN 978-0-8047-1180-7. Archived from the original on 18 October 2015.
- Slater, Michael (2009). Charles Dickens: A Life Defined by Writing. New Haven / London: Yale University Press. ISBN 978-0-300-11207-8.
- Smiley, Jane (2002). Charles Dickens. New York: Penguin. ISBN 978-0-670-03077-4.
- Smith, Grahame (2001). "The Life and Times of Charles Dickens". In Jordan, John O (ed.). The Cambridge Companion to Charles Dickens. Cambridge University Press. ISBN 978-0-521-66964-1.
- Stanley, Arthur Penrhyn (1870). "Dean Stanley on Charles Dickens". Speeches, letters, and sayings of Charles Dickens. Harper. Archived from the original on 8 October 2015.
- Stone, Harry (1987). Dickens's working notes for his novels. Chicago: University of Chicago Press. ISBN 978-0-226-14590-7. Archived from the original on 20 September 2015.
- Sutherland, John (1990). The Stanford Companion to Victorian Fiction. Stanford, California: Stanford University Press. ISBN 978-0-8047-1842-4. Archived from the original on 19 October 2015.
- Swift, Simon (18 April 2007). "What the Dickens?". The Guardian. Archived from the original on 24 December 2012.
- Tomalin, Claire (2011). Charles Dickens: A Life. Viking. ISBN 978-0-670-91767-9.
- Tomalin, Claire (1992). The invisible woman: the story of Nelly Ternan and Charles Dickens. Vintage Books. ISBN 978-0-679-73819-0. Archived from the original on 19 September 2015.
- Trollope, Anthony (2007). Bloom, Harold (ed.). Charles Dickens. Bloom's Classic Critical Views. Infobase Publishing. ISBN 978-0-7910-9558-4. Archived from the original on 25 October 2015.
- Van De Linde, Gérard (1978) [1917]. Reminiscences. Ayer Publishing. ISBN 978-0-405-10917-1. Archived from the original on 17 October 2015.
- Vlock, Deborah (1998). Dickens, Novel Reading, and the Victorian Popular Theatre. Cambridge Studies in Nineteenth-Century Literature and Culture. Vol. 19. Oxford University Press. ISBN 978-0-521-64084-8. Archived from the original on 21 September 2015.
- Werner, Alex (9 December 2011). "Exhibition in focus: Dickens and London, the Museum of London". The Daily Telegraph. Archived from the original on 7 April 2012.
- Wilson, Angus (1972). The World of Charles Dickens. Penguin Books. ISBN 978-0-670-02026-3. Archived from the original on 26 September 2015.
- Woolf, Virginia (1986). McNeillie, Andrew (ed.). The Essays of Virginia Woolf: 1925–1928 (2 ed.). Hogarth Press. ISBN 978-0-7012-0669-7. Archived from the original on 19 September 2015.
- Ziegler, Alan (2007). The Writing Workshop Note Book: Notes on Creating and Workshopping. Counterpoint Press. ISBN 978-1-933368-70-2. Archived from the original on 18 October 2015.

Media offices
Preceded by New position	Editor of the Daily News; 1846	Succeeded by John Forster
