= Dickens (surname) =

Dickens is an English surname originating from the name Dick, the diminutive of Richard, stemmed with the patronymic termination ens, meaning belonging to, or the son of. Notable people with the surname include:

== Charles Dickens family/descendants ==
- John Dickens (1785–1851), the father of novelist Charles Dickens
- Charles Dickens (1812–1870), British novelist of the Victorian era
- Catherine Dickens (1815–1879), estranged wife of Charles Dickens
- Frederick Dickens (1820–1868), younger brother of Charles Dickens
- Alfred Lamert Dickens (1822–1860), younger brother of Charles Dickens
- Augustus Dickens (1827–1866), younger brother of Charles Dickens
- Charles Dickens Jr. (1837–1896), editor and writer, first child of Charles Dickens
- Mary Dickens (1838–1896) oldest daughter of Charles Dickens
- Kate Dickens (1839–1929), second daughter of Charles Dickens and an artist
- Walter Landor Dickens (1841–1863) son of Charles Dickens
- Francis Dickens (1844–1886), member of the Royal Canadian Mounted Police, third son of Charles Dickens
- Alfred D'Orsay Tennyson Dickens (1845–1912), son of Charles Dickens and a lecturer on his father's life
- Sydney Smith Haldimand Dickens (1847–1872) son of Charles Dickens and a Royal Navy officer
- Henry Fielding Dickens (1849–1933), son of Charles Dickens and a King's Counsel and barrister
- Dora Annie Dickens, (1850–1851) youngest daughter of Charles Dickens
- Edward Dickens (1852–1902) youngest child of Charles Dickens
- Gerald Charles Dickens (1879–1962), grandson of Charles Dickens and an Admiral in the Royal Navy
- Monica Dickens (1915–1992), British writer, great-granddaughter of Charles Dickens
- Cedric Charles Dickens (1916–2006), great-grandson of Charles Dickens and steward of his literary legacy
- Peter Gerald Charles Dickens (1917–1987), great-grandson of Charles Dickens and a captain in the Royal Navy
- Gerald Charles Dickens (actor) (born 1963), great-great-grandson of Charles Dickens and an actor and performer

== Writers ==
- Charles Dickens (1812–1870), British novelist of the Victorian era
- A. G. Dickens (1910–2001), British academic and author about English Reformation
- Frank Dickens (1932–2016), British cartoonist, creator of the comic strip "Bristow"

== Sports ==
- Ernie Dickens (1921–1985), Canadian hockey defenceman
- Stanley Dickens (born 1952), Swedish race-car driver
- Alan Dickens (footballer) (born 1964), British football midfielder
- Alan Dickens (rugby union) (born 1978), British rugby union player
- Peggy Dickens (born 1975), French slalom canoer
- Kaniel Dickens (born 1978), U.S. basketball player
- Scott Dickens (born 1984), Canadian swimmer
- Phil Dickens (20th century), U.S. head football coach of Indiana University
- Jemondre Dickens (born 1998), South African soccer player

== Politicians, governmental, official ==
- Melchior Guy Dickens (1696–1775), British diplomat
- Samuel Dickens (?–1840), U.S. politician, Congressional Representative from North Carolina
- Francis Dickens (1844–1886), British mounted policeman, third son of Charles Dickens
- Geoffrey Dickens (1931–1995), British Conservative politician
- James Dickens (1931–2013), Labour MP
- Inez Dickens (20th century), U.S. member of the New York City Council
- David Dickens (20th century), former director of the Centre for Strategic Studies New Zealand
- Alan Dickins, British herald

== Music ==
- Little Jimmy Dickens (1920–2015), James Cecil Dickens, U.S. country music singer
- Hazel Dickens (1925–2011), U.S. bluegrass singer
- Andy Dickens (born 1953), British jazz trumpeter, singer, and bandleader

== Actors ==
- Matthew Dickens (1961–2013), American actor
- Kim Dickens (born 1965), U.S. actress

== Arts ==
- Archie Dickens (1907–2004), British pin-up artist

== Scientists ==
- Gerald R. Dickens, Professor of Earth Science at Rice University

== Fictional characters ==
- Eddie Dickens, lead character in several books by British author Philip Ardagh
