= Mary Angela Dickens =

Grandchild of Victorian-era novelist Charles Dickens

- Mary Angela Dickens in about 1900
- Born: 31 October 1862; Kensington, Middlesex, England
- Died: 7 February 1948 (aged 85); Hitchin, Hertfordshire, England
- Occupation: Novelist
- Known for: Oldest grandchild of novelist Charles Dickens
- Father: Charles Dickens Jr.

Mary Angela Dickens (31 October 1862 – 7 February 1948) was an English novelist and journalist of the late Victorian and Edwardian eras, and the oldest grandchild of the novelist Charles Dickens.

== Early years ==
Photographed in 1866

Born at 46 Gloucester Road in London, and named after her aunt, Mary Dickens, Mary Angela Dickens was the eldest of eight children of Charles Dickens, Jr. and his wife Elisabeth Matilda Moule Dickens (née Evans) and the granddaughter of Charles Dickens, the famous novelist and of Frederick Mullett Evans of Bradbury and Evans, Dickens's publisher. She was the niece of the noted barrister and judge, Sir Henry Fielding Dickens, and the painter Kate Perugini. She was christened on 19 December 1862 at St Mark's church in St Pancras in London.

In the Dickens family she was known as 'Mekitty', and as a child she called her grandfather 'Venerables'. Mary Angela Dickens and Charles Dickens were very close, and when she scalded her leg and foot with boiling water while staying at his country home Gads Hill Place he sat beside her bed and held her hand, reassuring her that he would make her well.

As a child she was taken to hear Dickens perform A Christmas Carol during one of his last public readings, and later in life recollected her shock at seeing her grandfather crying over the death of Tiny Tim. She later wrote:

'The "Venerables" on the platform was quite a stranger to me, and his proceedings were so eccentric as to be most alarming. He took no notice of me, or of my mother; and yet it seemed to me that he never took his eyes off me. And to Tiny Tim himself I owe my one intensely painful and distressing memory of my grandfather, for the climax of my discomfort was reached at last when it dawned upon my poor little faculties that "Venerables" was "crying." I never read the little scene in the carol where Bob Cratchit breaks down – the moment, I suppose, of this tragedy – without remembering the horror and dismay which seized upon me then. I knew nothing whatever about acting; any ideas I had about "pretending" were associated with the Christmas pantomime, and did not assimilate at all with the solitary appearance of my grandfather on a dull-looking platform. To me his distress was absolutely real. I had never before seen a grown-up person cry. I had not known that they ever did or ever could do so. And that "Venerables", of all people in the world, should cry with all those people looking on, and that no one should dare – as it seemed to me – to express sympathy, or offer consolation, was nothing short of an upheaval in my universe.'

After the death of Charles Dickens her father bought Gads Hill, and she and her siblings lived there until 1879 when Charles Dickens, Jr. was forced to sell it after getting into financial difficulties.

== Writing career ==
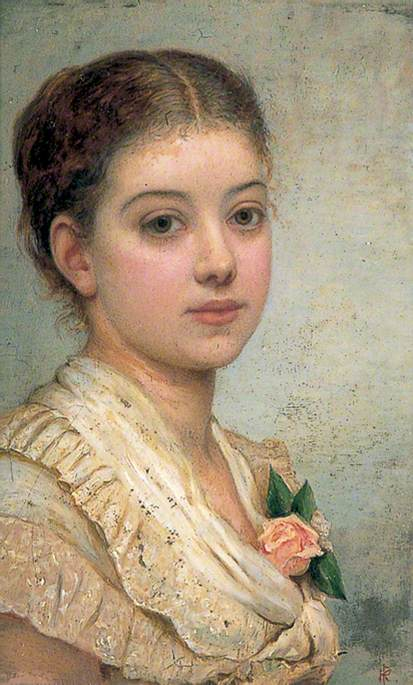
Mary Angela Dickens in 1882, by Kate Perugini

On the death of Charles Dickens, her father inherited the magazine All the Year Round, and Mary Angela Dickens published some of her earliest work in this periodical. She authored several popular sentimental and melodramatic novels during the 1890s, including Cross Currents (1891), probably her best known work, A Mere Cypher (1893), A Valiant Ignorance (1894), and Prisoners of Silence (1895).

Her later works included Against the Tide (1897), and On the Edge of a Precipice (1899). She also produced a number of books for children based on the novels of her grandfather, including Children's Stories from Dickens (1893) and Dickens' Dream Children (1926). These were illustrated by Harold Copping. A 1911 copy of her Children's Stories from Dickens, from a limited edition of 500 copies signed by herself and four other granddaughters of Charles Dickens, was owned by Eleanor Roosevelt. It was sold at auction by Christie's at their New York sale in 2001.

By the early 1900s her sensationalist style of writing had fallen out of fashion, and by about 1916 she had stopped writing. However, her children's books based on the works of her grandfather continued to be popular.

== Later life ==
During her later years she lived at 3 Baliol Road in Hitchin in Hertfordshire with her cousin, Margaret Alice Moule (1861–1939).

Mary Angela Dickens died aged 85 on 7 February 1948, on the 136th anniversary of Charles Dickens's birth. She never married, and on her death left £2,799 10s 2d to her cousin, Margaret Dickens Whinney. She was buried in Hitchin Cemetery in the same grave as Margaret Alice Moule.

== Gallery ==
Mary Angela Dickens in 1896

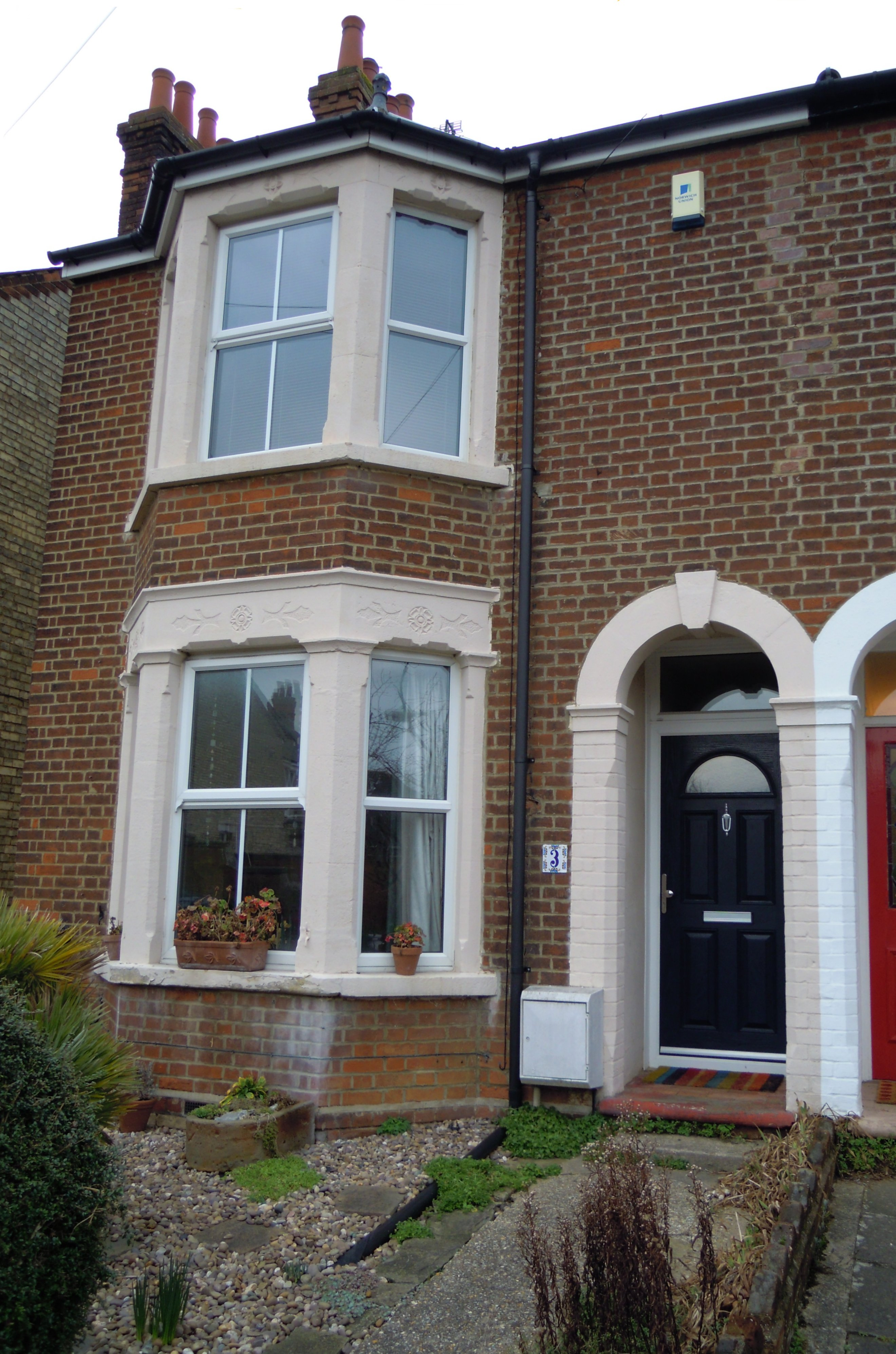
Dickens's last home, 3 Baliol Road in Hitchin

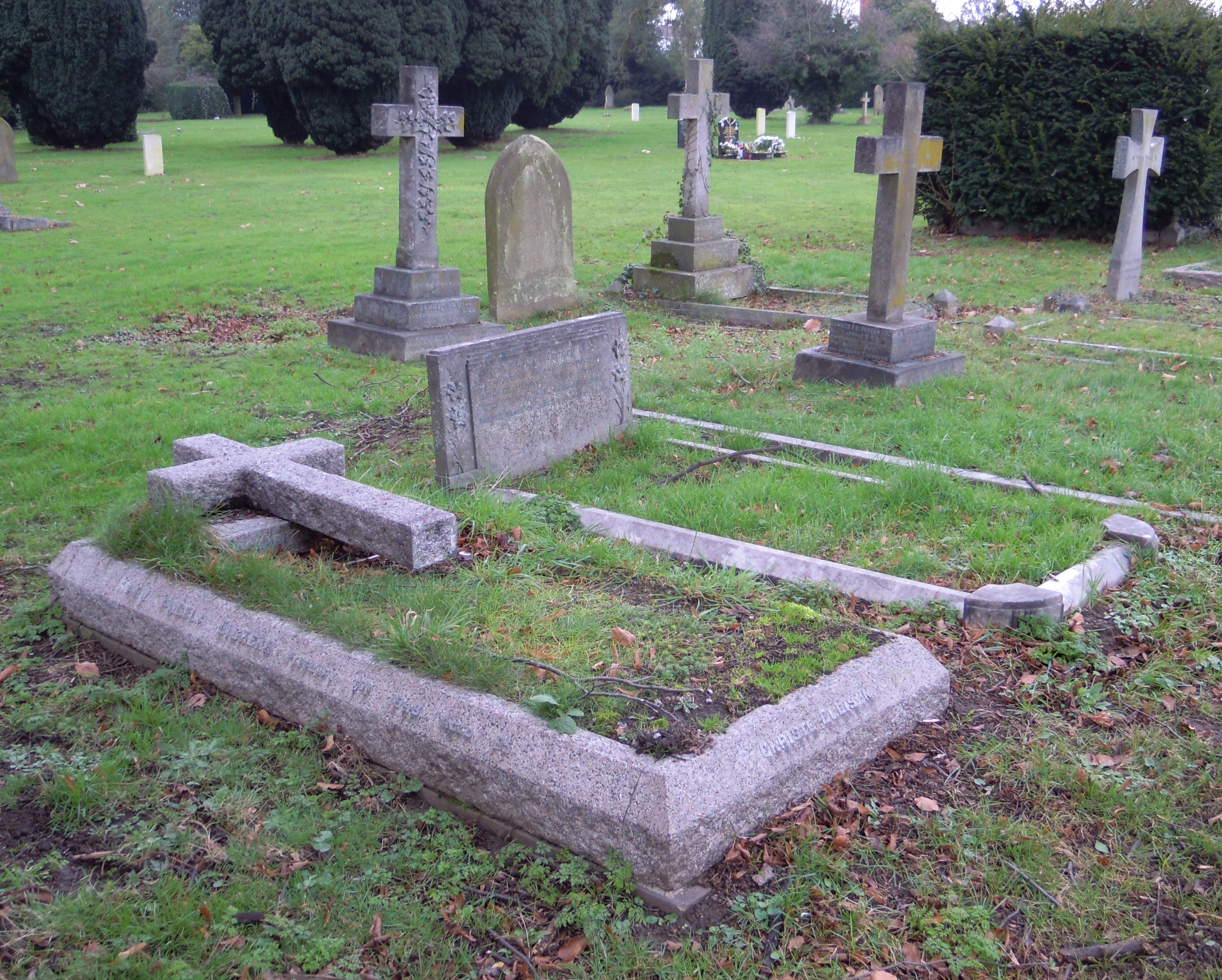
Mary Angela Dickens's grave (foreground) in Hitchin Cemetery

== Selected publications ==
=== Books ===
- A Mist of Error P. F. Collier, Publisher, New York (1890)
- Little David Copperfield, etc. Raphael Tuck & Sons, Ltd. London, Paris, Berlin, New York, (ca. 1890)
- Cross Currents Chapman & Hall, London (1891)
- Nobody's Fault Peter Fenelon Collier, New York (1892)
- A Mere Cypher. A Novel Macmillan & Co., London & New York (1893)
- Children's Stories from Dickens Raphael Tuck & Sons, London (1893)
- A Valiant Ignorance Macmillan & Co., London & New York (1894)
- Prisoners of Silence Osgood, McIlvaine & Co., London (1895)
- Some Women's Ways Jarrold & Sons, London (1896)
- The Love That Was Chicago & New York, Rand McNally, 1897
- Against the Tide Hutchinson & Co., London (1898)
- On the Edge of a Precipice Hutchinson & Co., London (1899)
- The Wastrel Hutchinson & Co., London (1900)
- Unveiled, and Other Stories Digby, Long & Co., London (1906)
- The Debtor Hutchinson & Co., London (1912)
- Sanctuary R. & T. Washbourne, London (1916)
- Dickens' Dream Children Raphael Tuck, (1926)

=== Articles ===
- 'Her Inheritance', in All the Year Round, third series, Vol. 1, Nos. 24 & 25, 1889. This was not credited on publication, but the later 'A Valiant Ignorance' shows her as author of this.
- 'Margery', in All the Year Round, third series, Vol. 2, Nos. 33–35, 1889
- 'Kitty's Victim', in All the Year Round, third series, Vol. 2, Nos. 51 & 52, 1889. This was not credited on publication, but the later 'A Valiant Ignorance' shows her as author of this.
- 'A Social Success', in All the Year Round, Christmas Number, 1889
- 'A Mist of Error', All the Year Round, Extra Summer Number, 1890
- 'Cross Currents', a novel serialised in All the Year Round, third series, Vol. 5 & 6, 1891
- 'An Outstanding Debt', in All the Year Round, Christmas Number, 1891
- 'Out of the Fashion', in All the Year Round, Extra Summer Number, 1892
- 'Taken on Trust', co-authored with Margaret Moule, in All the Year Round, Christmas Number, 1892
- 'A Valiant Ignorance', a novel serialised in All the Year Round, third series, volume 9 & 10, 1893
- 'Miss Keturah', in All the Year Round, Summer Holiday Number, 1893
- 'The Last Witness', in All the Year Round, Extra Christmas Number, 1893; co-authored with Margaret Moule
- 'A Child's Memories of Gad's Hill', in The Strand Magazine, Volume XIII, No. 73, February 1897
- 'The Catch of the Season', in The Strand Magazine, Volume XIV, No. 79, July 1897 (illustrated by Sidney Paget)

== See also ==
Dickens family
