= The King of Kings (2025 film) =

Animated film by Seong-ho Jang

- Theatrical release poster
- Directed by: Seong-ho Jang
- Written by: Seong-ho Jang
- Based on: The Life of Our Lord by Charles Dickens
- Produced by: Seong-ho Jang; Woo-hyung Kim
- Starring: Kenneth Branagh; Uma Thurman; Mark Hamill; Pierce Brosnan; Roman Griffin Davis; Forest Whitaker; Ben Kingsley; Oscar Isaac
- Cinematography: Woo-hyung Kim
- Edited by: Seong-ho Jang
- Music by: Kim Tae-seong
- Production company: Mofac Studios
- Distributed by: (United States) Angel Studios; (South Korea) D-Station
- Release dates: April 11, 2025 (United States); July 16, 2025 (South Korea)
- Running time: 104 minutes
- Countries: United States; South Korea
- Language: English
- Budget: ₩36 billion (~$25.2 million)
- Box office: $83.5 million

The King of Kings is a 2025 English-language South Korean animated Christian film written and directed by Seong-ho Jang, loosely inspired by the children's book The Life of Our Lord by Charles Dickens. The film stars the voices of Kenneth Branagh, Uma Thurman, Mark Hamill, Pierce Brosnan, Roman Griffin Davis, Forest Whitaker, Ben Kingsley, and Oscar Isaac.

The King of Kings was released in the United States by Angel Studios on April 11, 2025. It received mixed reviews from critics and was a box office success, grossing $83.5 million.

== Plot ==
Charles Dickens attempts to recite his story A Christmas Carol to a London theatre audience, but is interrupted by his overly rambunctious son Walter, who enacts the exploits of King Arthur backstage along with his cat, Willa. Dickens considers punishing the boy for ruining the recital, but instead his wife Catherine suggests he tell his son about a king even greater than Arthur: the "King of Kings", Jesus Christ. Initially hesitant, Walter agrees to listen to his father's story, but on condition that he can stop if he finds it boring.

As the tale unfolds, Walter becomes so emotionally involved in the life of Jesus that he demands his father finish the story, despite Charles' warnings that it becomes upsetting. Walter begins to imagine himself and Willa within the story; travelling along with Jesus and the disciples, they witness all the events in Christ's life: the Nativity, the Ministry, the Miracles and the Passion. His father also explains to him the meaning of Jesus' sacrifice by telling him the story of Adam and Eve and the original sin, but Walter has great difficulty accepting and understanding such an atrocious and unjust death.

Deeply saddened by Jesus' death, Walter suddenly finds himself sinking to the bottom of the sea, like the apostle Peter when he attempted to follow Jesus as he walked on water. Walter calls out for help and is rescued by Jesus, who disappears underwater and replaced with an empty cross. Returning to dry land, Walter contemplates the cross and begins to feel redemption and salvation through Jesus' sacrifice and is overwhelmed with admiration and gratitude as he begins to understand Jesus' love for him.

Finally, Walter finds the empty tomb of Jesus, where the resurrected Jesus bids him a silent goodbye before walking towards the horizon. Overjoyed to realize that Jesus still lives, Walter runs to tell his siblings the story, inspiring Dickens to write down the life of Jesus for his children. The film closes with words from the Gospel of John: "I am the way and the truth and the life. No one comes to the Father except through me."

== Voice cast ==
- Kenneth Branagh as Charles Dickens
  - Branagh is also credited as the voice of Scrooge, Joseph, John the Baptist, and God alongside the parentheses (As Dickens Storytelling)
- Uma Thurman as Catherine Dickens
  - Thurman is also credited as the voice of Mary and Angel alongside the parentheses (As Catherine Storytelling)
- Mark Hamill as King Herod
- Pierce Brosnan as Pontius Pilate
- Roman Griffin Davis as Walter Dickens
- Forest Whitaker as Peter
- Ben Kingsley as High Priest Caiaphas
- Oscar Isaac as Jesus, Satan
- Ava Sanger as Mary Dickens
- Dee Bradley Baker as Willa the Cat
- James Arnold Taylor as Melchior, Matthew, Phillip, Thomas, Young Jesus, Herod's Scribe
- Jim Cummings as Pharisee Hillel, Dismas, James the Greater
- Jamie Thomason as Andrew, Simon, John, Judas Iscariot, Possessed Man
- Fred Tatasciore as Pharisee Eleazar
- Vanessa Marshall as Mary of Bethany
- Mick Wingert as Gaspar, Pharisee Mahaliell
- Imari Williams as Balthazar, Bartholomew
- Frank Todaro as Gestas
- Millicent Miereanu as Martha of Bethany

== Production ==
In September 2024, it was announced that an animated adaptation loosely based on The Life of Our Lord by Charles Dickens was in development, with Kenneth Branagh, Uma Thurman, Roman Griffin Davis, Oscar Isaac, Forest Whitaker, Pierce Brosnan, Mark Hamill, and Ben Kingsley joining the cast. In March 2025, veteran voice actors Dee Bradley Baker, James Arnold Taylor, Jim Cummings, Fred Tatasciore, and Vanessa Marshall were each announced to be among the cast through social media.

Despite being a South Korean production, visual effects were done by Animost Studio in Vietnam, the post-production was done at the SunJive Studios in Adelaide, additional animation was done by Lightbox Animation Studios in Spain, and the voice cast are American and British. The total budget cost before marketing was ₩36 billion (around $25.2 million at the time of production).

== Release ==
In November 2024, Angel Studios acquired worldwide rights to the film. The official teaser for the film was released in November 2024. The film was released on April 11, 2025.

== Reception ==
=== Box office ===
The King of Kings grossed $60.3 million in the United States and Canada and $23.2 million in other territories, for a total of $83.5 million worldwide.

In the United States and Canada, The King of Kings was released alongside The Amateur, Warfare, and Drop, and was projected to gross $12–14 million from 3,200 theaters in its opening weekend. The film made $14.6 million in pre-sales heading into its release. The film made $7 million on its first day, including $2 million from Thursday night previews. It went on to overperform and debut to $19.4 million, finishing second at the box office behind A Minecraft Movie. This opening broke the record for the highest weekend debut for an animated biblical film, which had previously been held by The Prince of Egypt ($14 million) since 1998. The record was broken eight months later by David ($22 million), another film from Angel Studios. In its second weekend, which coincided with Good Friday and Easter, the film made $17.6 million (a drop of just 9%), finishing in third behind Sinners and A Minecraft Movie. By the end of April, The King of Kings had surpassed Parasite as the highest-grossing Korean movie in North America.

=== Critical response ===
On the review aggregator website Rotten Tomatoes, 60% of 58 critics' reviews are positive, with an average rating of 5.8/10. The website's consensus reads: "Putting the Christ story in an approachable frame for children, The King of Kings isn't the most sophisticated example of family animation but makes for a solidly watchable Sunday school." Metacritic, which uses a weighted average, assigned the film a score of 42 out of 100, based on six critics, indicating "mixed or average" reviews. Audiences polled by CinemaScore gave the film a rare average grade of "A+", while those surveyed by PostTrak gave it a 94% overall positive score, with 83% saying they would definitely recommend the film.
