= Georgina Hogarth =

Sister-in-law of Charles Dickens (1827–1917)

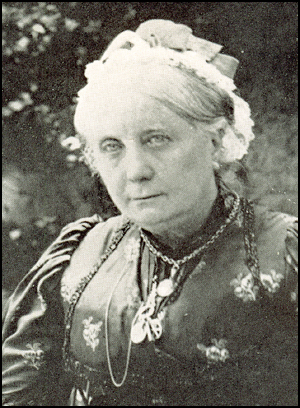
- Georgina Hogarth in c. 1880
- Born: Georgina Hogarth; 22 January 1827; Scotland
- Died: 19 April 1917 (aged 90)
- Parent: George Hogarth (father)
- Relatives: Catherine Dickens (sister)

Georgina Hogarth (22 January 1827 – 19 April 1917) was the sister-in-law, housekeeper, and adviser of English novelist Charles Dickens and the editor of three volumes of his collected letters after his death.

== Biography ==
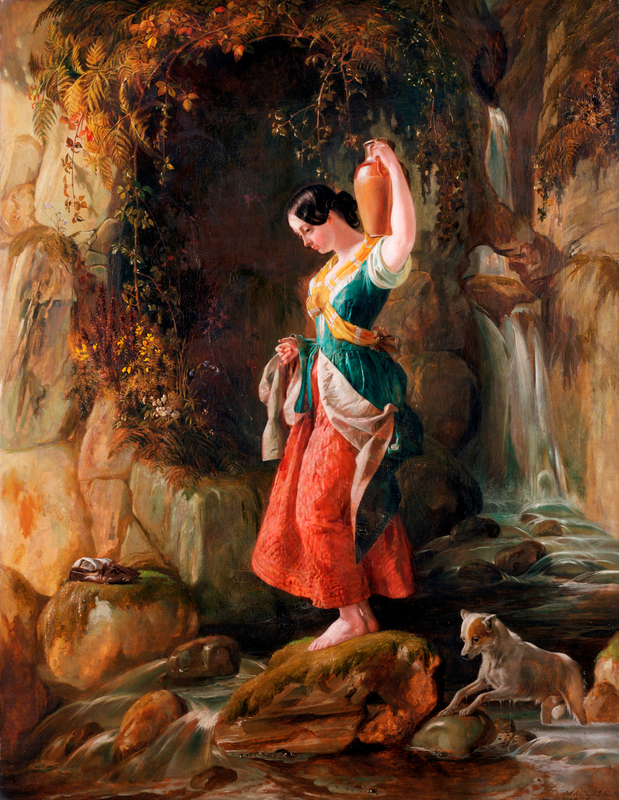
Waterfall at St Nighton's Kieve by Daniel Maclise, 1842

'Georgy' Hogarth was one of 10 children born in Scotland to music critic George Hogarth and his wife Georgina. In 1834, Georgy and her family moved to England where her father had taken a job as a music critic for The Morning Chronicle.

In 1842, aged 15, Georgy Hogarth joined the Dickens family household when Dickens and his wife Catherine (born Hogarth) sailed to America; Georgy cared for the young family they had left behind. She remained with them as housekeeper, organiser, adviser, and friend until her brother-in-law's death in 1870, after which she stayed in regular contact with the surviving members of the Dickens family.

In 1842 she posed for the painting Waterfall at St Nighton's Kieve produced by the Irish artist Daniel Maclise, a friend of Dickens who purchased the work.

== Discord ==
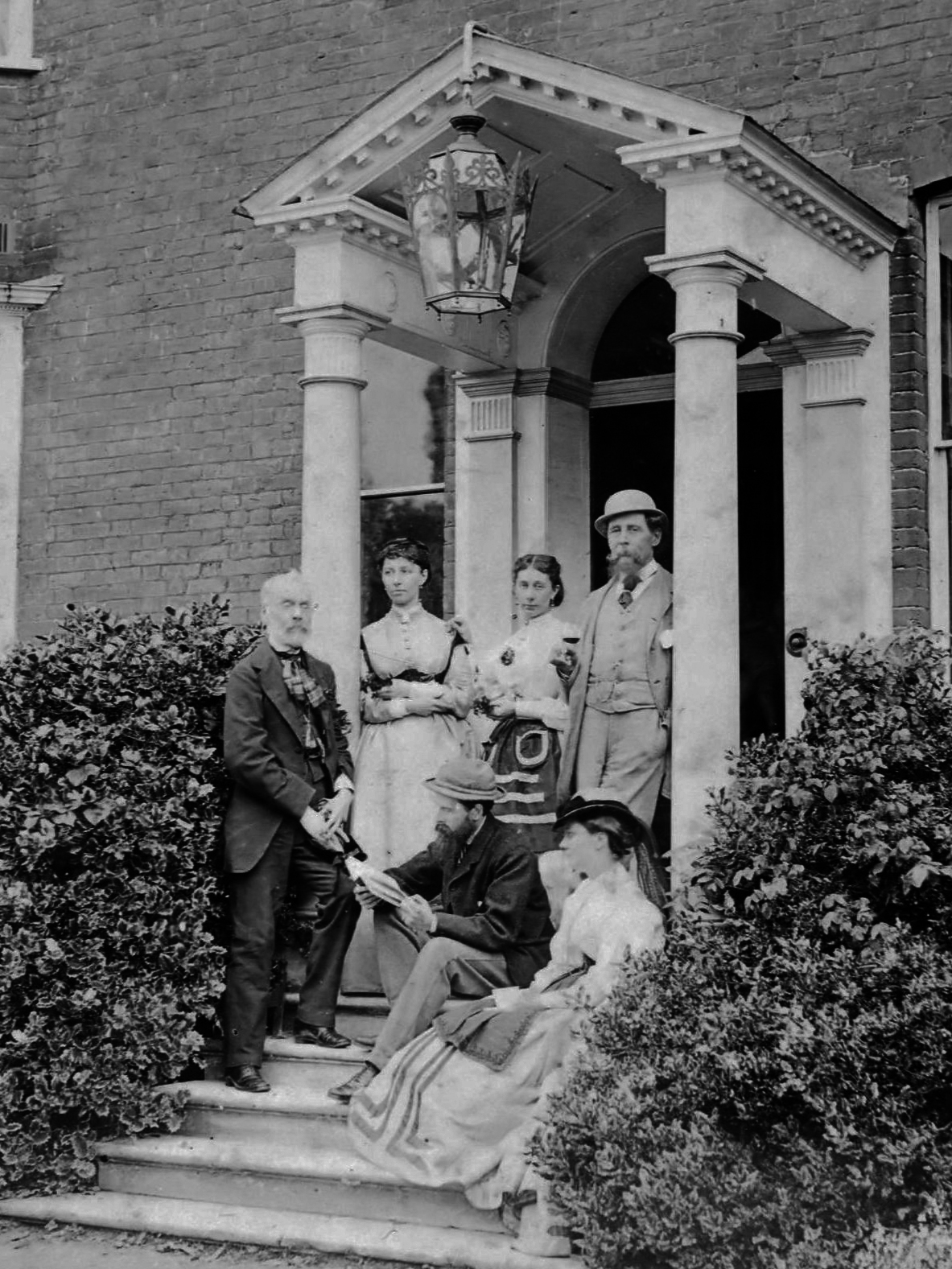
Group portrait in the porch at Gads Hill Place, H.F. Chorley, Kate Dickens, Mamie Dickens, Charles Dickens, C.A. Collins and Georgina Hogarth

In 1858, Georgina Hogarth sided with Dickens in his quarrel with her sister, Catherine, Dickens's wife. This caused the family to break apart. Georgina, Dickens, and all of the children except Charles Dickens, Jr. remained in their home at Tavistock House, while Catherine and Charles Jr. moved out. Georgina ran Dickens' household. On 12 June 1858, Dickens published an article in his journal, Household Words, denying rumours in circulation about his separation without clarifying what they were or indeed the reasons behind the separation.

Some domestic trouble of mine, of long-standing, on which I will make no further remark than that it claims to be respected, as being of a sacredly private nature, has lately been brought to an arrangement, which involves no anger or ill-will of any kind, and the whole origin, progress, and surrounding circumstances of which have been, throughout, within the knowledge of my children. It is amicably composed, and its details have now but to be forgotten by those concerned in it....By some means, arising out of wickedness, or out of folly, or out of inconceivable wild chance, or out of all three, this trouble has been made the occasion of misrepresentations, most grossly false, most monstrous, and most cruel – involving, not only me, but innocent persons dear to my heart.... I most solemnly declare, then – and this I do both in my own name and in my wife's name – that all the lately whispered rumours touching the trouble, at which I have glanced, are abominably false. And whosoever repeats one of them after this denial, will lie as wilfully and as foully as it is possible for any false witness to lie, before heaven and earth.

He sent this statement to the newspapers, including The Times, and many reprinted it. He fell out with Bradbury and Evans, his publishers, because they refused to publish his statement in Punch as they thought it unsuitable for a humorous periodical. A less circumspect public statement appeared in the New York Tribune, which later found its way into several British newspapers. In this statement Dickens declared that it had been only Georgina Hogarth who had held the family together for some time:

...I will merely remark of [my wife] that some peculiarity of her character has thrown all the children on someone else. I do not know – I cannot by any stretch of fancy imagine – what would have become of them but for this aunt, who has grown up with them, to whom they are devoted, and who has sacrificed the best part of her youth and life to them. She has remonstrated, reasoned, suffered, and toiled, again and again, to prevent a separation between Mrs. Dickens and me. Mrs. Dickens has often expressed to her sense of affectionate care and devotion in her home – never more strongly than within the last twelve months.

One day in the same year, William Makepeace Thackeray asserted that Dickens's separation from Catherine was due to a liaison with an actress, Ellen Ternan, rather than with Georgina Hogarth as had been put to him. This remark coming to Dickens' attention, Dickens was so infuriated that it almost put an end to the Dickens-Thackeray friendship.

With rumours that he and Georgina Hogarth were having an affair circulating—at a time that a sexual relationship with a sister-in-law was considered incestuous—Dickens allegedly obtained a doctor's certificate of virginity for her.

== Later years ==
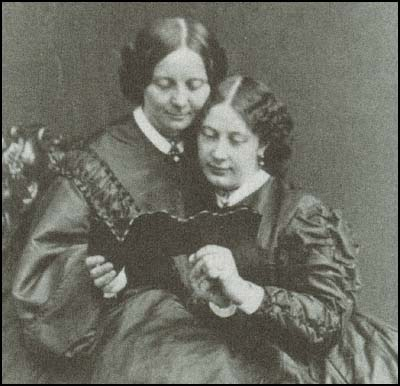
Georgina Hogarth and Mamie Dickens

On the death of Dickens on 9 June 1870, Georgina Hogarth and Ellen Ternan were at his bedside. In his will Dickens left Hogarth the then huge sum of £8,000, and "...all my private papers whatsoever and wheresoever". Among these papers was the manuscript of The Life of Our Lord, written in 1849 by Dickens exclusively for his children, to whom he read it aloud every Christmas. On her death in 1917 it came into the possession of Sir Henry Fielding Dickens, Dickens's last surviving son.

Using the private letters Dickens left to her in his will, working with Dickens's eldest daughter, Mary 'Mamie' Dickens, and using Wilkie Collins as an adviser, Hogarth edited three editions of The Letters of Charles Dickens From 1833 To 1870. This included a two-volume edition published in 1880, with a third volume appearing in 1882, a new and shorter edition in two volumes, also in 1882, and a one-volume edition in 1893. As is typical in a family selection, all letters on private family matters were omitted. No mention was made of the money-troubles of John Dickens, Charles's father, the marital troubles of Fred and Augustus Dickens, Dickens's brothers, Dickens's own separation from Catherine or his worries over his sons Alfred Dickens and Edward Dickens. What was unusual, however, was the editors' methods: if cuts were made in one letter leaving passages stranded, these passages were inserted in letters of a later date.

In the Preface Georgina Hogarth and Mary Dickens stated:

"We intend this Collection of Letters to be a Supplement to the "Life of Charles Dickens," by John Forster. That work, perfect and exhaustive as a biography, is only incomplete as regards correspondence; the scheme of the book having made it impossible to include in its space any letters, or hardly any, besides those addressed to Mr. Forster. As no man ever expressed himself more in his letters than Charles Dickens, we believe that in publishing this careful selection from his general correspondence we shall be supplying a want which has been universally felt."

Georgina Hogarth died in 1917 and was buried at the Old Mortlake Burial Ground in the London Borough of Richmond upon Thames.

== Controversy ==
In January 2009, The Times and other newspapers reported on a diamond ring that was purported to once have belonged to Charles Dickens and which was cited as evidence that he had an illegitimate child with Georgina Hogarth. The previously undocumented gold ring, set with a single 0.9-carat (180 mg) diamond, was auctioned in February 2009, realising a hammer price of £26,000. It sold to an anonymous collector from Northern Ireland. According to an inscription, the ring was presented to Dickens by Alfred Lord Tennyson, the Poet Laureate and a close personal friend, in 1854.

The articles reported that the ring later became the proud possession of Hector Charles Bulwer Lytton Dickens, who had claimed to be the novelist's illegitimate son through a relationship with Georgina Hogarth. The ring was being sold by Hector Dickens's descendants, along with letters, two wills and various newspaper reports which they state support his claim. His family claim that in 1890 Hector Dickens bought the ring from one of Dickens's legitimate sons, Alfred Dickens, who lived in Australia for 45 years and who is said to have fallen on hard times.

Florian Schweizer, the curator of the Charles Dickens Museum in London's Doughty Street is recorded as saying that if genuine the ring could turn Dickens history "...on its head... There have been rumours of them having an affair but it has never been substantiated because there has never been any reliable evidence emerge. They lived together for the last 13 years with Georgina as a friend and companion, but Dickens also had a mistress at the same time."

In her biography of Ternan, The Invisible Woman, Claire Tomalin, who wrote a biography of Ellen Ternan—allegedly another of Dickens's mistresses— asserted that Charley Peters, aka Hector Charles Bulwer Lytton Dickens, "had simply changed his name in Australia in 1900. He was not even a clever liar; he did not know, for instance, that his alleged mother, Miss Hogarth, was still alive at the time of his claim. The story was kept from her and easily shown to be false," though it has been repeated many times.

In a December 2014 interview with National Geographic, Charles Dickens' great-great-grandson Mark Charles Dickens stated that he underwent a DNA test per a journalist's request to prove or disprove that Hector Dickens was an illegitimate son of the famous author. Mark's results did not match those of Hector Dickens' descendant's DNA, but Mark's DNA did match those of another known Dickens distant relative who also took the test.

== Portrayals ==
In the 1976 Yorkshire Television miniseries Dickens of London, starring Roy Dotrice as Charles Dickens, the actresses Patsy Kensit played a young Georgina Hogarth, while Christine McKenna played her as an adult.

== Bibliography ==
- Adria, Arthur A. (1957). Georgina Dickens and the Dickens Circle. Oxford University Press.
- Dickens, Charles & Hogarth, Georgina (Editor) & Dickens, Mary (Editor_ (1880). The Letters of Charles Dickens From 1833 To 1870,2 Volumes.
