= Walter Landor Dickens =

British Indian Army officer, child of novelist Charles Dickens

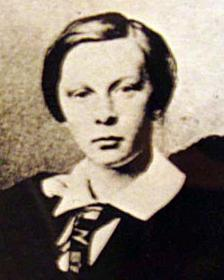
- Born: Walter Savage Landor Dickens; 8 February 1841; St Marylebone, London, England
- Died: 31 December 1863 (aged 22); Calcutta, British Raj (present day Kolkata, India)
- Resting place: Bhowanipore Cemetery, Kolkata, India
- Occupation: Indian Army officer
- Parent(s): Charles Dickens; Catherine Hogarth

Walter Savage Landor Dickens (8 February 1841 – 31 December 1863) was the fourth child and second son of English novelist Charles Dickens and his wife Catherine. He became an officer cadet in the East India Company's Presidency armies just before the Indian Rebellion of 1857. The rebellion resulted in the British Crown extending direct rule to India, and Dickens continued to serve in what was now becoming the British Indian Army until his death.

== Biography ==
Named after his godfather Walter Savage Landor, Walter Dickens was christened at St Marylebone Parish Church on 4 December 1841, after which Charles Dickens held a celebratory party. The guests included Elliotson, Landor, Maclise, Macready, Stanfield and Talfourd. Walter was educated at Wimbledon. Nicknamed 'Young Skull' by his father, Walter Dickens showed early signs of aspiring to be an author like his father, but Charles Dickens instructed Walter's tutor to encourage him to not write, stating "The less he is encouraged to write the better, and the happier he will be." Instead, through the influence of Angela Burdett-Coutts, Walter became a cadet in the East India Company, leaving England for India in 1857 aged 16 at the start of the Indian Rebellion of 1857. At this time there was no single unified army in India. Each of the three Presidencies of India had its own army, and, in addition, a limited number of British Army units were also stationed in India.

After seeing Walter off at Southampton with his oldest son Charley, Charles Dickens was very upset for a few days but soon recovered and was satisfied that he had provided a career for his son, even though Walter was not suited to the life his father had chosen for him. Charles Dickens wrote, "A sad trial, thank God it is over. The dear boy bore it a great deal better than we could have hoped." Walter never returned home and his father was never to see him again.

Following the introduction of direct rule in India in the wake of the Rebellion, the armed forces were reorganised. A notice published in the London Gazette dated 1 March 1864 granted all those serving with "Her Majesty's Indian Forces on the 18th February 1861" rank in the British Army; Walter Dickens was amongst those listed with the rank of lieutenant. He served in the 26th Native Infantry Regiment, and was attached to the 42nd Regiment of Foot (The Black Watch) with that rank when he fell heavily into debt causing his health to break down. He was due to be invalided back to England but died of an aortic aneurysm on New Year's Eve at the Officers' Hospital in Calcutta in India. He was buried in the Bhowanipore Military Cemetery at Calcutta. In April 1987, a group of students from Jadavpur University, Calcutta, collected funds and moved the tombstone from the Bhowanipore War Cemetery to the South Park Street Cemetery. This was done as a tribute to the author and his father, and the tombstone is now placed among the memorials of the notable Europeans who died in the 19th century.

His father did not receive the news of Walter's death until his own birthday on 7 February 1864. Later, he received Walter's unpaid bills.

Walter Dickens's name appears with those of his nine siblings on the monument next to his mother Catherine Dickens's grave in Highgate Cemetery in London. His brother Sydney Dickens, who was buried at sea in the Indian Ocean, is also commemorated there. His infant sister Dora Dickens is buried with her mother.

== See also ==
- Dickens family
