= Old Mortlake Burial Ground =

Cemetery in Mortlake, London, England

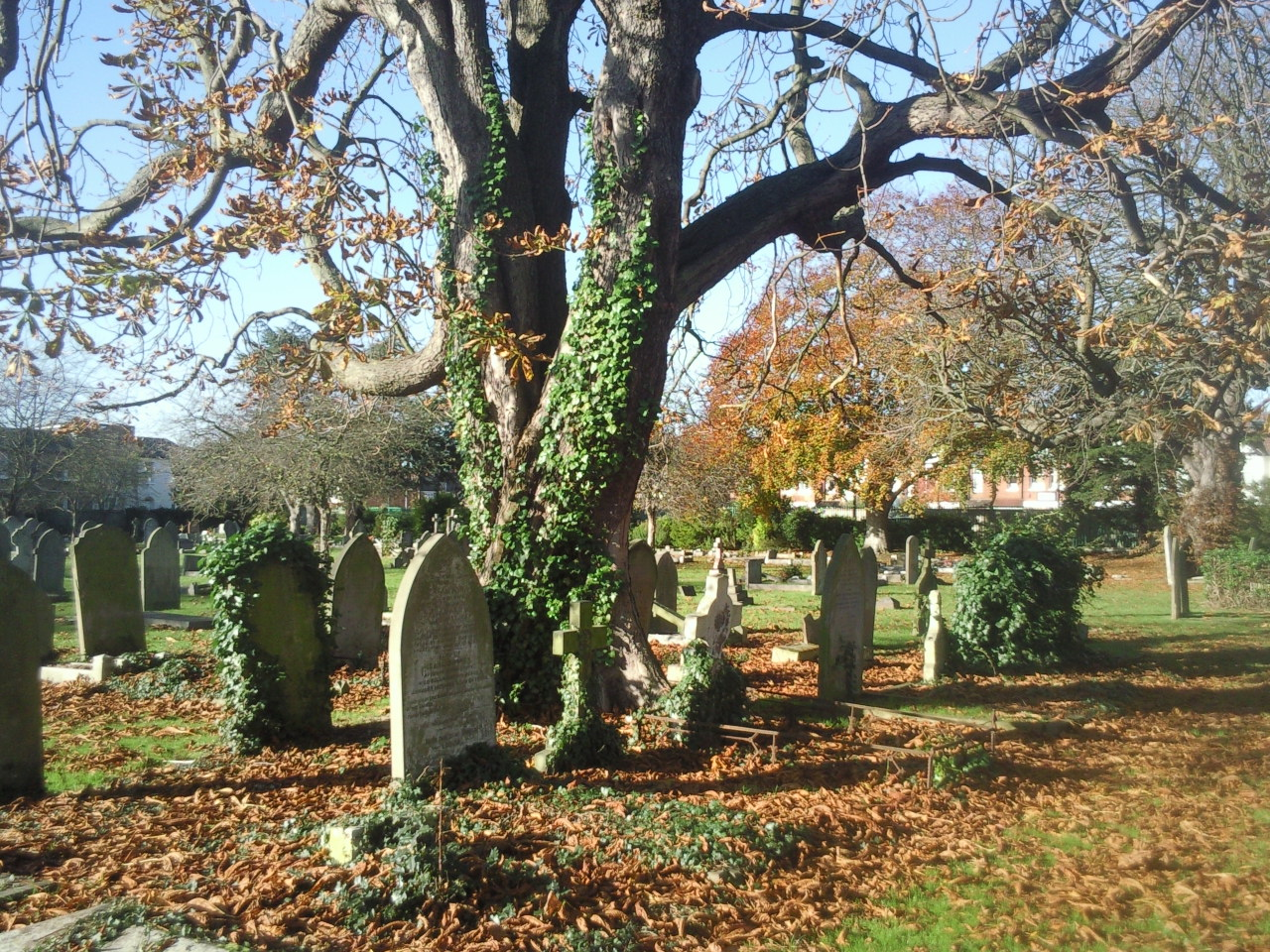
- Interactive map of Old Mortlake Burial Ground

Details
- Established: 1854
- Location: Mortlake, London Borough of Richmond upon Thames
- Country: England
- Coordinates: 51.46703°N 0.25825°W
- Owned by: Richmond upon Thames Borough Council
- Find a Grave: Old Mortlake Burial Ground

Old Mortlake Burial Ground, also known as Old Mortlake Cemetery, is a cemetery in Mortlake in the London Borough of Richmond upon Thames, at Avenue Gardens, London SW14 8BP. Established in 1854, and enlarged in 1877, it is now managed by Richmond upon Thames Borough Council.

The cemetery contains Commonwealth war graves of 21 British service personnel, 19 from World War I and two from World War II.

== Notable burials ==
Notable people buried in Old Mortlake Burial Ground include:

- Sir Edwin Chadwick (1800–1890), social reformer
- Rear Admiral Lord William FitzRoy (1782–1857), Royal Navy officer and Member of Parliament. His grave is marked by an obelisk
- Charles Dickens, Jr. (1837–1896), writer, editor, and eldest son of the famous novelist
- Georgina Hogarth (1827–1917), sister-in-law, housekeeper, and adviser of novelist Charles Dickens and the editor of two volumes of his collected letters after his death
- Admiral Sir Erasmus Ommanney (1814–1904), Royal Navy officer and Arctic explorer
- Thomas German Reed (1817–1888), theatrical manager, composer, musical director, actor and singer who, with his wife Priscilla Horton (1818–1895), created the German Reed Entertainments, family-friendly musical plays "of a refined nature"

== See also ==
- Mortlake Cemetery
