= Dickens family =

Family

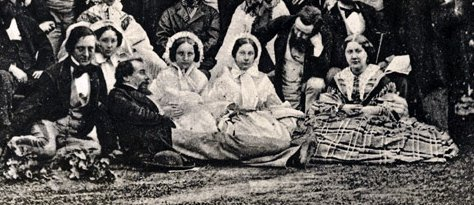
The Dickens family (and friends) in 1864 - (l-r) Charles Dickens Jr., Kate Dickens, Charles Dickens, Miss Hogarth, Mary Dickens, Wilkie Collins, Georgina Hogarth

The Dickens family are the descendants of John Dickens, the father of the English novelist Charles Dickens. John Dickens was a clerk in the Royal Navy Pay Office and had eight children from his marriage to Elizabeth Barrow. Their second child and eldest son was Charles Dickens, whose descendants include the novelist Monica Dickens, the writer Lucinda Dickens Hawksley and the actors Harry Lloyd and Brian Forster.

John Dickens was according to his son Charles "a jovial opportunist with no money sense" and was the inspiration for Mr Micawber in his 1850 novel David Copperfield.

== Family ==
The family members include:

- John Dickens (1785–1851), married Elizabeth Barrow (1789–1863)

- Frances Elizabeth Dickens (1810–1848), married Henry Burnett

- Henry Augustus Burnett (1839–1849)
- Charles Dickens Kneller Burnett (1841–1881)

- Charles John Huffam Dickens (1812–1870), novelist, married Catherine Hogarth (1815–1879)

- Charles Culliford Boz Dickens (1837–1896), editor and writer, married Elizabeth Matilda Moule Evans

- Mary Angela Dickens (1862–1948), journalist and novelist and writer of Children's Stories from Dickens
- Sydney Margaret Dickens (b. 1866), married Thomas Bostock Whinney (1860−1926), architect

- Margaret Dickens Whinney (1897–1974), art historian
- Humphrey Charles Dickens Whinney (1899−1982), married Evelyn Revell Low

- Michael Humphrey Dickens Whinney (1930–2017), Anglican bishop

- Philip Charles Dickens Whinny (1901−1959)

- Mary "Mamie" Dickens (1838–1896)
- Catherine Elizabeth Macready Dickens (1839–1929), artist, married (i) Charles Allston Collins (1828–1872), (ii) Charles Edward Perugini (1839–1918)

- Leonard Ralph Dickens Perugini (1875−1876)

- Walter Savage Landor Dickens (1841–1863), Indian Army officer
- Francis Jeffrey Dickens (1844–1886), Canadian mounted policeman
- Alfred D'Orsay Tennyson Dickens (1845–1912), lecturer on his father's life, married (i) Augusta Jessie Devlin (1849−1878), (ii) Emily Riley (1863−1913)

- Kathleen Mary Dickens (1874−1951)
- Violet Georgina Dickens (1875–1952)

- Sydney Smith Haldimand Dickens (1847–1872), Royal Navy officer
- Henry Fielding Dickens (1849–1933), barrister, married Marie Roche (1852–1940)

- Enid Henrietta Dickens (1877–1950), married Ernest Bouchier Hawksley (1876–1931)

- Aileen Dickens Bouchier Hawksley (1907–1961) married (i) Mr. Downing (ii) Alan William Napier-Clavering (1903−1988)

- Jennifer Raine Downing (1932–1993), actress, married Peter Cochrane Forster (1920–1982)

- Brian A. Forster (b. 1960), actor

- Cyril Dickens Bouchier Hawksley (1909–1976)

- Henry Dickens Bouchier Hawksley (b. 1932)

- Joanna Mary Dickens Baldwin
- Virginia (Ginny) Jane Dickens Hawksley-Lennard
- Lucinda Anne Dickens Hawksley (b. 1977), author

- Henry Charles Dickens (1878–1966) m Fanny Runge

- Monica Enid Dickens (1915–1992), writer

- Gerald Charles Dickens (1879–1962), Royal Navy officer, married Kathleen Pearl Birch

- Peter Gerald Charles Dickens (1917–1987), Royal Navy officer, married Mary Alice Blagrove

- Mark Dickens, Royal Navy officer
- Marion Evelyn Dickens, married Jonathan Lloyd

- Harry Charles Salusbury Lloyd (b. 1983), actor

- David Charles Dickens (1925–2005), medical editor

- Gerald Charles Dickens (b. 1963), actor, married (i) Lucy Marsh, (ii) Elizabeth Hayes

- Cameron Thomas Charles Dickens

- Philip Charles Dickens (1887–1964)

- Cedric Charles Dickens (1916–2006), writer and businessman

- Cedric Charles Dickens (1889–1916)

- Dora Annie Dickens (1850–1851)
- Edward Bulwer Lytton Dickens (1852–1902), Australian politician

- Alfred Allen Dickens (b. and d. 1814)
- Letitia Dickens (1816–1893), married Henry Austin, architect and artist
- Harriet Dickens (1819–1822)
- Frederick Dickens (1820–1868), married Anna Weller
- Alfred Lamert Dickens (1822–1860), railway engineer, married Helen Dobson

- Alfred Charles Dickens (1847–1878)
- Edmund Henry Dickens (1849–1910)
- Florence Helen Dickens (1850–1941)
- Katherine Louisa Dickens (1853–1921)
- Augusta Maud Dickens (1857–1941)

- Augustus Dickens (1827–1866), land agent, married Harriet Lovell
