= Waterfall at St Nighton's Kieve =

Painting by Daniel Maclise

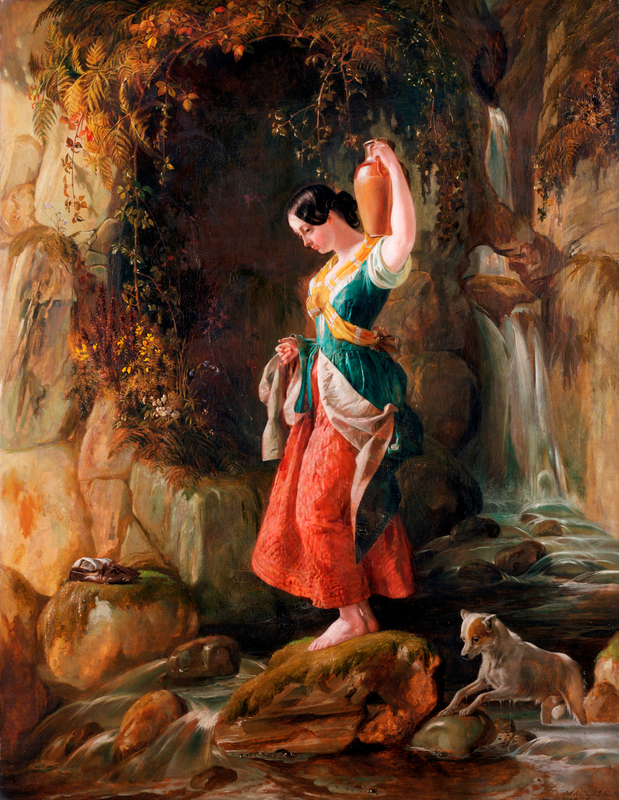
- Artist: Daniel Maclise
- Year: 1842
- Type: Oil on canvas, genre painting
- Dimensions: 94.5 cm × 70.5 cm (37.2 in × 27.8 in)
- Location: Victoria and Albert Museum, London

Waterfall at St Nighton's Kieve is an 1842 genre painting by the Irish artist Daniel Maclise. It features a scene at St Nectan's Glen near Tintagel in Cornwall. Maclise had sketched the spot while on holiday in Cornwall with his friends writer Charles Dickens and fellow painter Clarkson Stanfield in autumn 1842. The model was Dickens' sister-in-law Georgina Hogarth. It is also known by the longer title Waterfall at St Nighton's Kieve, near Tintagel.

Dickens wished to acquire the painting, but feared that Maclise would give it to him for free or charge a fraction of its real value, so he purchased it via an intermediary. The painting was displayed at the Royal Academy Exhibition of 1843 held at the National Gallery in London. After Dickens' death it was purchased by his friend John Forster who bequeathed it to the Victoria and Albert Museum in South Kensington in 1876. In 1848 the engraver Frederick Bacon produced a popular print The Nymph of the Waterfall for the Art Union of London based on the painting.

== See also ==
- Portrait of Catherine Dickens, an 1847 painting by Maclise of Hogarth's sister

== Bibliography ==
- Grilli, Stephanie Jeanne. Pre-Raphaelite Portraiture, 1848-1854. Yale University, 1980.
- Nayder, Lillian. The Other Dickens: A Life of Catherine Hogarth. Cornell University Press, 2012.
- Saunders, Gill (ed.) 100 Great Paintings in the Victoria and Albert Museum. Victoria & Albert Museum, 1985.
- Skelton, Christine. Charles Dickens and Georgina Hogarth: A Curious and Enduring Relationship. Manchester University Press, 2023.
- Weston, Nancy. Daniel Maclise: Irish Artist in Victorian London. Four Courts Press, 2001.
