= Dora Annie Dickens =

Infant daughter of Charles Dickens

- Born: 16 August 1850; London, England
- Died: April 14, 1851 (aged 8 months)
- Parent(s): Charles Dickens; Catherine Hogarth

Dora Annie Dickens (16 August 1850 – 14 April 1851) was the infant daughter of English novelist Charles Dickens and his wife Catherine. She was the ninth of their ten children, and the youngest of their three daughters.

== Life ==
Born at 1 Devonshire Terrace, Dora Dickens was named after the character Dora Spenlow, the child-bride of David Copperfield in Charles' 1850 novel David Copperfield. According to her oldest sister, Mary, on 14 April 1851 her father spent much of his time "playing with the children and carrying little Dora about the house and garden" of their Devonshire Terrace home. He then changed and went to the London Tavern for an annual dinner, at which he was to give a speech. Shortly before he spoke, his friend John Forster was called out of the room by one of Charles' servants, who came with the news that Dora had suddenly died after convulsions. He kept this from Charles until the speech was done.

"Half an hour before Charles rose to speak I had been called out of the room by one of the servants from Devonshire-terrace to tell me his child Dora was suddenly dead. She had not been strong from her birth; but there was just at this time no cause for special fear, when unexpected convulsions came, and the frail little life passed away. My decision had to be formed at once; and I satisfied myself that it would be best to permit his part of the proceedings to close before the truth was told to him. But as he went on, after the sentences I have quoted, to speak of actors having to come from scenes of sickness, of suffering, aye, even of death itself, to play their parts before us, my part was very difficult."

== Impact on parents ==
Charles returned home. Mary later recalled, "I remember what a change seemed to have come over my dear father's face when we saw him again ... how pale and sad it looked." All that night he sat keeping watch over his daughter's body, supported by his friend Mark Lemon. The next day he wrote to his wife Catherine, who was recuperating at Malvern, Worcestershire. Anxious that news of death might further harm her health, he instead told of illness. Forster delivered the letter and later told her the truth. It read:

Devonshire Terrace, April 15, 1851
My Dearest Kate,
Now observe, you must read this letter very slowly and carefully. If you have hurried on thus far without quite understanding (apprehending some bad news) I rely on your turning back and read again.
Little Dora, without being in the least pain, is suddenly stricken ill. She awoke out of a sleep, and was seen in one moment to be very ill. Mind! I will not deceive you. I think her "very" ill.
There is nothing in her appearance but perfect rest. You would suppose her quietly asleep. But I am sure she is very ill, and I cannot encourage myself with much hope of her recovery. I do not—and why should I say I do to you, my dear?—I do not think her recovery at all likely.
I do like to leave home, I can do no good here, but I think it right to stay. You will not like to be away, I know, and I cannot reconcile it to myself to keep you away. Forster, with his usual affection for us, comes down to bring you this letter and to bring you home, but I cannot close it without putting the strongest entreaty and injunction upon you to come with perfect composure—to remember what I have often told you, that we never can expect to be exempt, as to our many children, from the afflictions of other parents, and that if,—if—when you come, I should even have to say to you, "Our little baby is dead," you are to do your duty to the rest, and to shew yourself worthy of the great trust you hold in them.
If you will read this steadily I have a perfect confidence in your doing what is right.
Ever affectionately, Charles Dickens

Catherine then "fell into a state of 'morbid' grief and suffering", recovering her composure after twelve hours or so. Charles retained his composure for some time. Mary recalled: "He did not break down until, an evening or two after her death, some beautiful flowers were sent ... He was about to take them upstairs and place them on the little dead baby, when he suddenly gave way completely."

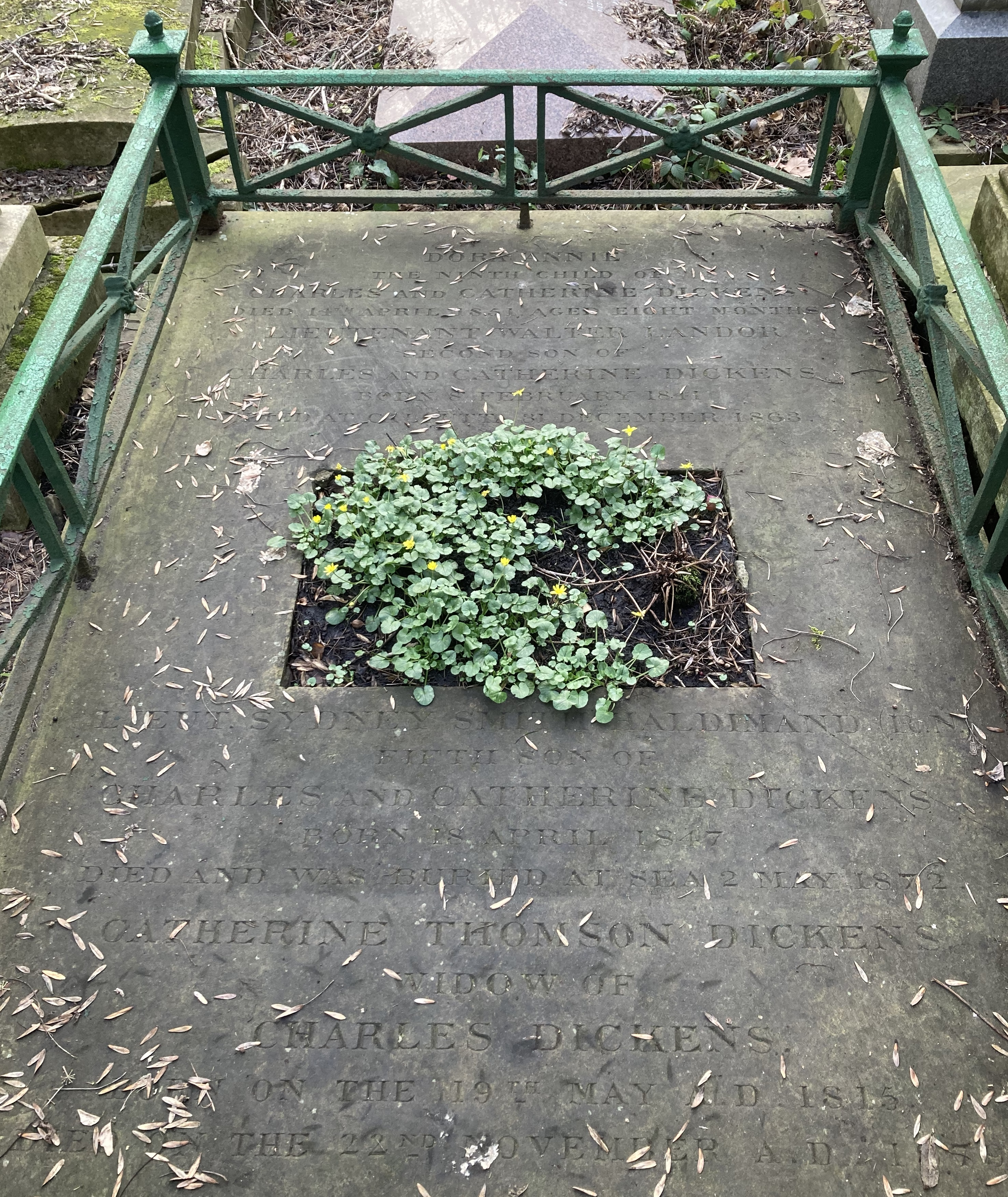
Grave of Dora Annie and Catherine Dickens in Highgate Cemetery (west side)

== Burial ==
Dora lies in Highgate Cemetery. Initially her coffin was placed in the catacombs whilst Charles sought a family plot. This took several years, for legal reasons. It was then found on a spot in view of London. The inscription reads "Dora Annie, the ninth child of Charles and Catherine Dickens, died 14th. April 1851, aged 8 months." On her own death in 1879, Catherine was buried with her. Charles and the other children were not.

== See also ==
- Dickens family
