= Sydney Smith Haldimand Dickens =

Officer in the Royal Navy, child of Charles Dickens

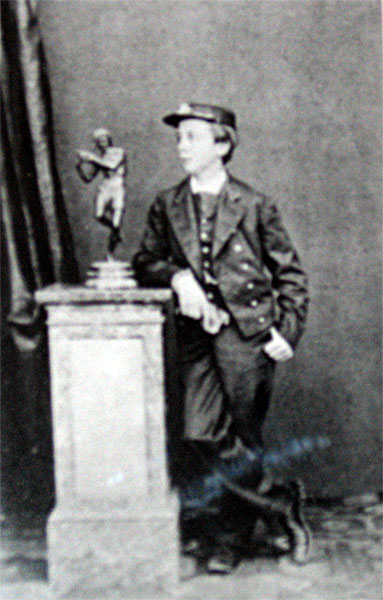
- Sydney Dickens, c. 1860
- Born: 18 April 1847; London, England
- Died: 2 May 1872 (aged 25)
- Parent(s): Charles Dickens; Catherine Hogarth

Sydney Smith Haldimand Dickens (18 April 1847 – 2 May 1872) was a Royal Navy officer, the fifth son and seventh child of English novelist Charles Dickens and his wife Catherine.

== Biography ==
An endearing child, nicknamed by his father "The Ocean Spectre" and "The Admiral,” Sydney Dickens was born at 3 Chester Place and baptized at the church of St. Mary in Marylebone in London on 24 June 1847, his godfathers being William Haldimand of Lausanne, and Henry Porter Smith (1797–1880), an actuary for the Eagle Life Assurance Company. He was educated at Brackenbury's Military School at Wimbledon and at Mr Gibson's boarding school in Boulogne-sur-Mer, with his brothers, Alfred and Henry.

When Sydney was aged 3, and staying with the family at Broadstairs, his father asked him if he would walk to the railway station to meet John Forster, who was coming for a visit. Without hesitation Sydney answered "Yes" and set off through the garden gate and down the street until another of the children ran after him and fetched him back. Aged 13 he was sent to North Grove House in Southsea, intending to train as a naval officer, a move designed by his father to encourage him to become self-sufficient in life. As a boy he had shown great energy and character, and was described by his father as a "born little sailor". On 11 September 1860, aged 14, Sydney Dickens joined the Royal Navy as a cadet on the training ship Britannia. After his initial training he was posted to HMS Orlando on 6 December 1861.

He was rated midshipman on 7 March 1862. On 19 May 1864 his career suffered a setback when he was docked a year's seniority "for misconduct"; however, following a period of satisfactory conduct, 8 months of that time was restored to him on 9 November 1866. On 30 August 1867 he was promoted to acting sub-lieutenant, and confirmed in the rank from 30 November 1867.

He was promoted acting lieutenant on 20 April 1868, reverted to sub lieutenant on 27 August 1868, had a further period as an acting lieutenant from 19 July 1869 to 28 February 1870. He was promoted to the rank of lieutenant on 6 February 1872. Charles Dickens was proud of Sydney's naval career, but was unhappy that he had fallen heavily into debt, and refused to help him. Indeed, at one stage Sydney became so reckless with money that his father refused to allow him into the house, and in later years his sister, Mamie Dickens, said she thought of him with "contempt" and even "horror".

Whilst serving in HMS Topaze Sydney Dickens was invalided by ill health on 22 April 1872. He returned aboard Peninsular & Oriental Line steamer Malta for the passage home from India to England, and died at sea on 2 May 1872. He was buried at sea in the Indian Ocean.

== See also ==
- Dickens family
