= Archie Dickens =

British artist

Archie "Gluckli" Dickens
- Born: Archie Bernard Dickins; June , 1907; Balham, London, U.K.
- Died: 28 November 2004 (aged 97)
- Known for: pin-ups, greeting cards
- Movement: Illustrator

Archie Dickens (christened Archie Bernard Dickins - 1907 – 28 November 2004), son of a bootmaker clicker, was a British greeting card artist and later a pin-up artist who was born in Balham (London) in June 1907.

At a young age it became apparent that Archie and his older sister, Doris Louise, had some talent in drawing and it was intended that both he and his sister attend the Slade School of Art in London. However, due to a change in his father's circumstances, only his sister continued in further education whilst Archie, at the age of 14, was sent to work.

After returning from Sydney, Australia where Dickens had spent much of World War II, he purchased a house in Acacia Gardens in West Wickham, Kent, and worked in a purpose-built studio in the grounds.

Dickens spent much of the early post-war years drawing pin-ups but in the 1960s and 1970s turned his artistic talents to greeting cards which could be seen in the greeting card shops across the UK at the time — having adopted the signature 'Gluckli' as the increasingly well-known identifying mark to Dickens' obvious Archie style.

In March 2002 Tony Blair, the then British Prime Minister, wore a Paul Smith designer shirt that displayed one of Dickens' paintings on the cuff.
