= Charles Dickens Jr. =

English writer; son of Charles Dickens (1837–1896)

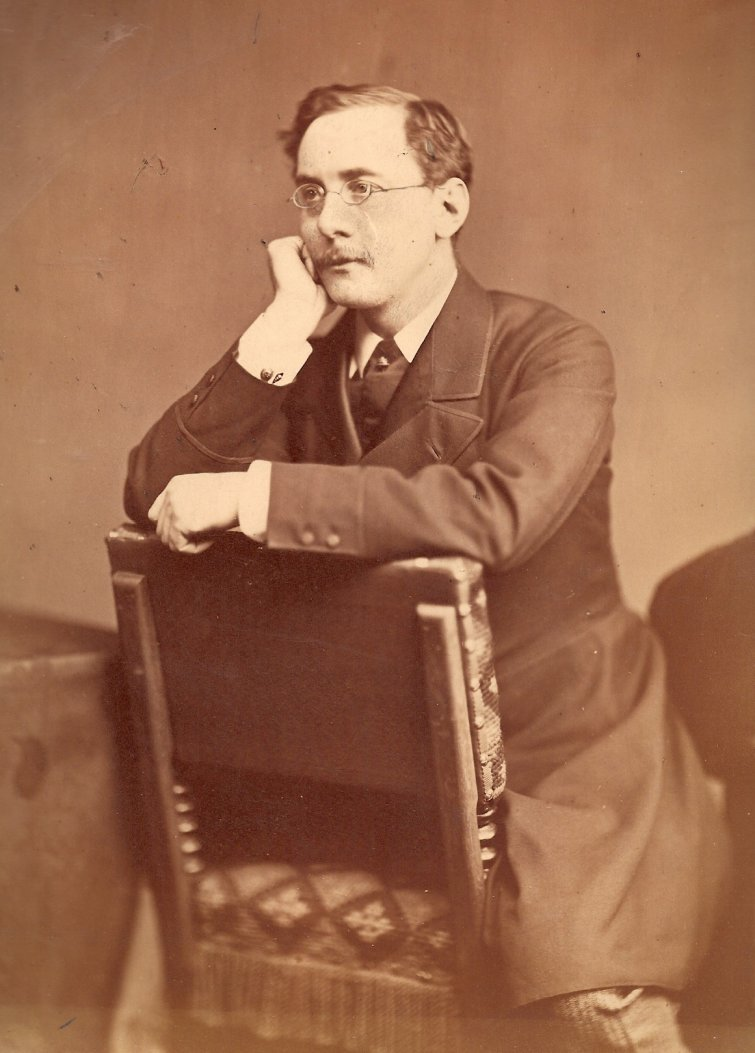
- Dickens Jr. in 1874
- Born: Charles Culliford Boz Dickens; 6 January 1837; Holborn, London, England
- Died: 20 July 1896 (aged 59); Fulham, London, England
- Resting place: Mortlake Cemetery
- Occupations: Writer, Editor
- Spouse: Elisabeth Matilda Moule Evans
- Children: 8, including Mary Angela Dickens
- Parents: Charles Dickens (father); Catherine Hogarth (mother)
- Writing career
- Notable works: The Life of Charles James Mathews; Dickens's Dictionary of London; Dickens's Dictionary of the Thames; Dickens's Dictionary of Paris; John Jasper's Secret: Sequel to Charles Dickens' Mystery of Edwin Drood (with Wilkie Collins)

Charles Culliford Boz Dickens (6 January 1837 – 20 July 1896), better known as Charles Dickens Jr., was the first child of the English novelist Charles Dickens and his wife Catherine. A failed businessman, he became the editor of his father's magazine All the Year Round, and a writer of dictionaries. He is now most remembered for his two 1879 books, Dickens's Dictionary of London and Dickens's Dictionary of the Thames.

== Life and career ==
Charles Dickens Jr. was born at Furnival's Inn in Holborn, London, the first child of Charles Dickens and his wife Catherine Hogarth. He was called "Charley" by family and friends. In 1847, aged ten, he entered the junior department of King's College, London. He went to Eton College, and visited Leipzig in 1853 to study German. In 1855, aged 18, he entered Barings Bank. In 1858, after his parents' separation, his father agreed he should live with his mother.

As a young man, Dickens showed skills that could have led to a career in journalism but his father encouraged him to go into business. With ambitions to become a tea merchant, he visited China, Hong Kong and Japan in 1860.

In 1861, he married Elisabeth Matilda Moule Evans, daughter of Frederick Mullett Evans, his father's former publisher. They had eight children:

- Mary Angela (1862–1948)
- Ethel Kate (1864–1936)
- Charles Walter (1865–1923)
- Sydney Margaret (1866–1955)
- Dorothy Gertrude (1868–1923)
- Beatrice (1869–1937)
- Cecil Mary (1871–1952)
- Evelyn Bessie (1873–1924)

In 1866 he was appointed as the first Honorary Secretary of the Metropolitan Regatta. In 1868, after the failure of his printing business, and bankruptcy, he was hired by his father to work at All the Year Round and was appointed sub-editor the following year. In 1870, after his father's death, Dickens Jr. inherited the magazine and became its editor. At this time he also bought at auction Gads Hill Place, his father's Kent home, but he was forced to give it up in 1879.

In 1879 he published (jointly with his father-in-law) the first editions of his two main dictionaries, Dickens's Dictionary of London and Dickens's Dictionary of the Thames. In 1882 his dictionaries were picked up by Macmillan & Co. who also released his third dictionary, Dickens's Dictionary of Paris, delayed by verifications explained in its introduction.

Charles Dickens Jr. died of heart disease, at his home in Fulham, London, on 20 July 1896, aged 59. He was buried at Old Mortlake Burial Ground on 23 July 1896.

== Legacy ==
Dickens's estate was worth £17 5s. 3d at his death, and his widow was granted a government pension of £100 per year. After her death in 1909 yearly civil list pensions of £25 were granted to Mary Angela, Dorothy Gertrude, Cecil Mary and Evelyn Bessie after "consideration of their straitened circumstances". In 1910 their situation was so difficult that Ethel Dickens wrote to the Lord Chief Justice Richard Alverstone to seek assistance. In the letter, which was also published in The Daily Telegraph, she explained that her sisters were "barely making a living" as secretaries and babysitters and that her doctor told her to take six months' rest due to overwork.

As the centenary of their grandfather's birth approached, the reduced circumstances of Charles Jr.'s daughters led to a public fundraising appeal. On 7 January 1912 a gala performance in which "leading actors and actresses" appeared as Dickens's characters at the London Coliseum raised £2500, while a separate appeal by The Daily Telegraph added an additional £3882. By the close of the fund in March 1912 it held £12,000, which was to provide £150 per year to each of the daughters.

Author Lucinda Hawksley, a descendant of the elder Charles Dickens, has written that "the girls' begging letter" caused embarrassment for their uncle, London barrister Henry Fielding Dickens, while the daughters of another uncle, Alfred D'Orsay Tennyson Dickens, gave an interview to a newspaper in Australia, where they had been raised, to make clear that they were not seeking any part of the funds.

Dickens's biographer Claire Tomalin said Charles Walter, only son of Dickens Jr., had been disowned by the family for marrying Ella Dare, a barmaid. Sydney Margaret went on to marry architect Thomas Bostock Whinney. Ethel died in 1936 of an overdose of phenobarbital at her flat in Chelsea, London.

== Bibliography ==
Dickens's publications include:

- 1879 – The life of Charles James Mathews, chiefly autobiographical, with selections from his correspondence and speeches.
- 1879 – Dickens's Dictionary of London: An Unconventional Handbook.
- 1879 – Dickens's Dictionary of the Thames, from its source to the Nore.
- 1881 – Dickens's Dictionary of Days.
- 1882 – Dickens's Dictionary of Paris: An Unconventional Handbook.
- 1884 – A Dictionary of the University of Cambridge.
- 1884 – A Dictionary of the University of Oxford.

He also wrote the introductions to many posthumous reprints of his father's books, such as Barnaby Rudge, Oliver Twist, Bleak House, and Little Dorrit, providing biographical and bibliographical insights. His Reminiscences of My Father was published posthumously in 1934.

=== Dickens's Dictionary of London ===
Dickens's Dictionary of London: An Unconventional Handbook is the main book of Charles Dickens Jr. It was first published in London in 1879, by "Charles Dickens and Evans" (Dickens Jr. and his father-in-law, publisher Frederick Evans).

The book was then updated and reprinted every year until the author's death, from 1880 (second year) to the final 1896–1897 edition (eighteenth year). His dictionaries had been picked up in 1882 by Macmillan & Co. who printed them until 1889, after which it was again published by Dickens and Evans through J. Smith.

=== Dickens's Dictionary of the Thames ===
Dickens's Dictionary of the Thames, From Oxford to the Nore: An Unconventional Handbook is the second book of Charles Dickens Jr. The "1880" edition was first published in London in 1879, by "Charles Dickens and Evans" (Dickens Jr. and his father-in-law, publisher Frederick Evans). The next 1880 edition and further were slightly retitled to Dickens's Dictionary of the Thames, From Its Source to the Nore: An Unconventional Handbook.

The book was then updated and reprinted every year until the author's death, from 1880 to the final 1896 edition. His dictionaries had been picked up in 1882 by Macmillan & Co. who printed them until 1889, after which it was again published by Dickens and Evans through J. Smith.

== See also ==
- Dickens family
