= Alfred D'Orsay Tennyson Dickens =

Sixth child and fourth son of English novelist Charles Dickens

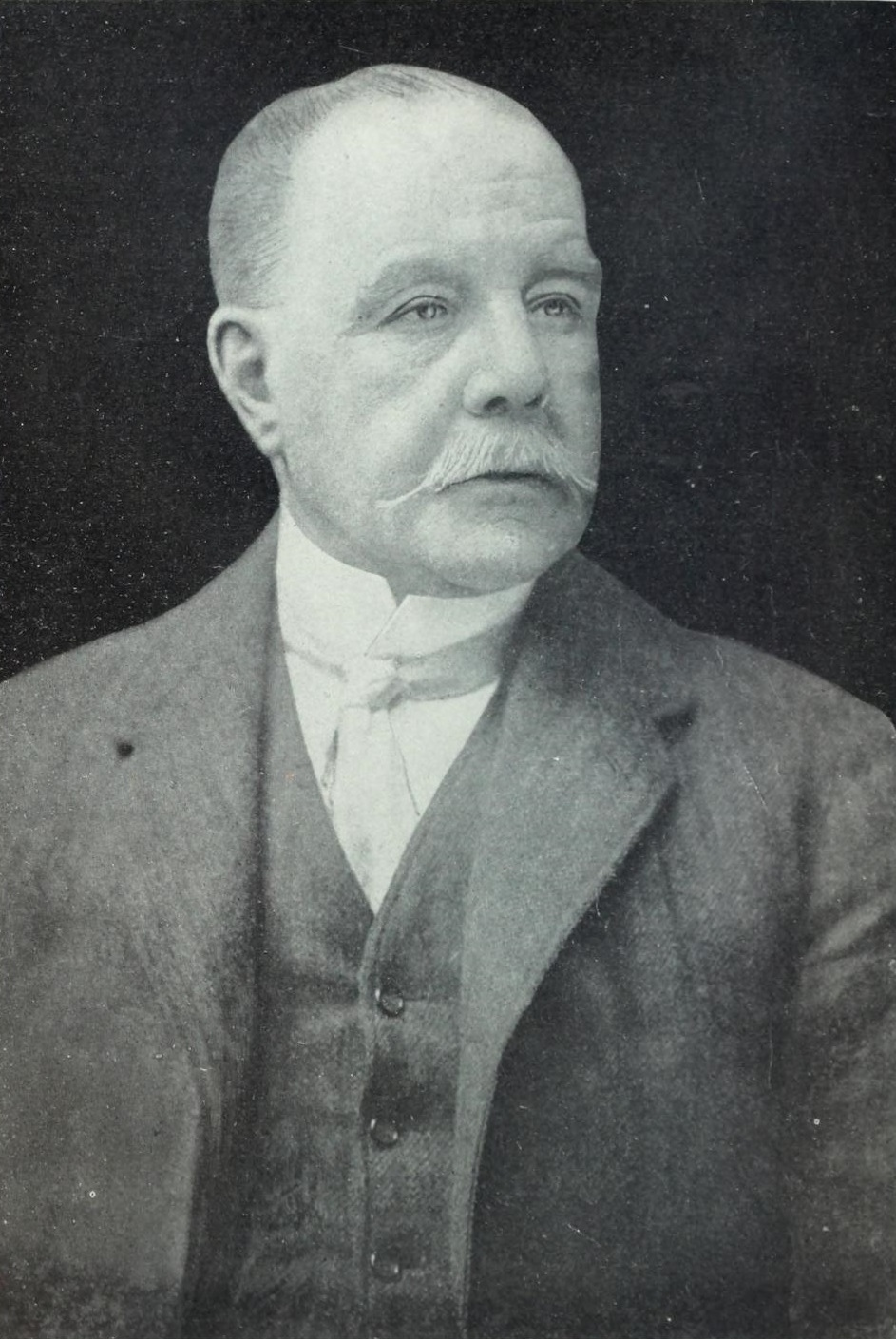
- Alfred Dickens
- Born: 28 October 1845; London, England
- Died: 2 January 1912 (aged 66); New York City, U.S.
- Occupation: Lecturer
- Spouse(s): Augusta Jessie Devlin (died 1878) Emily Riley (m. 1888)
- Children: 2
- Parent(s): Charles Dickens; Catherine Hogarth

Alfred D'Orsay Tennyson Dickens (28 October 1845 – 2 January 1912) was an English lecturer. The sixth child and fourth son of English novelist Charles Dickens and his wife Catherine, Dickens made lecture tours in Australia, Europe, and the United States on his father's life and work.

== Early life ==
Nicknamed "Sampson Brass" and "Skittles" by his father, Alfred Dickens was born at 1 Devonshire Terrace, near Regent's Park, and was baptized at the church of St. Mary Marylebone in London on 21 April 1846. He was named after his godfathers, Alfred, Lord Tennyson and Alfred, Comte d'Orsay. Because of this choice of godfathers Alfred's christening became a popular topic among literary people. Father Prout wrote:

What eye but glistens
And what ear but listens
When the clergy christens
A babe of 'Boz'

Edward Fitzgerald wrote to his friend Edward Barton that Tennyson and Count D'Orsay had stood as godparents to one of Dickens's children, and that the unfortunate child had been named 'Alfred D'Orsay Tennyson', which he believed proved that 'Dickens was a snob ... For what is Snobbishness and Cockneyism, but all such pretensions and parade? It is one thing to worship heroes and another to lick their spittle.' Robert Browning wrote to Elizabeth Barrett, who shortly after married him in the same church in which Alfred Dickens had been baptized, wondering if she knew why Alfred Tennyson has been dining with Dickens to meet celebrities.

'What do you suppose caused all the dining and repining? He has been sponsor to Dickens's child in company with Count D'Orsay and accordingly the novus homo glories in the praenomia Alfred d'Orsay Tennyson Dickens ... You observe Alfred is common to both the godfather and the devil-father ... When you remember what the form of sponsorship is, to what it pledges you in the Church of England – and then remember that Mr. Dickens is an enlightened Unitarian – you will get a curious notion of the man, I fancy.'

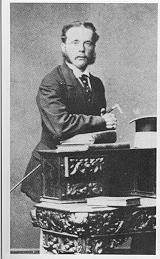
Alfred Dickens in 1865

Alfred Dickens was educated at Brackenbury's Military School at Wimbledon and at Mr Gibson's boarding school in Boulogne-sur-Mer, with his brothers Henry and Sydney. Alfred Dickens considered a career in the Army, in medicine, and in business, but after failing the entrance examination into the Army, instead he spent two years working in a China House in London.

He shared his father's love for fashionable clothing, and ran up bills, in his father's name, at various tailors. Persuaded by his father, he migrated to Australia in June 1865 aged 19, leaving behind many unpaid bills. His father came to see him off at Paddington Station.

Charles Dickens sent him with some money and letters of introduction, hoping that he would make a career there and that he would cease to be a financial drain upon his father. According to various letters, Charles Dickens sent his son to Australia "to seek his fortune"; although he saw Alfred as "steady and working, though not in the least brilliant," he had been anxious to get him "far away from home," being concerned about the negative influence of his brothers and the "idleness" of London. He was followed shortly afterwards by his younger brother Edward Dickens. Alfred Dickens remained in Australia for 45 years.

== Australia ==
Dickens settled in Australia quickly, becoming manager of Corona station on the border of New South Wales and South Australia. He remained in Australia for 45 years. Charles Dickens having died in 1870, Alfred purchased Wangagong station, near Forbes with his share of his father's estate. In 1874 he moved to Hamilton, Victoria, to take up a position as a station agent.

Dickens married Augusta Jessie Devlin (1849–1878), known as 'The Belle of Melbourne", in a fashionable wedding in Toorak, Victoria, with whom he had two daughters, Kathleen Mary (1874 – 1951) and Violet Georgina (1875 – 1952). Jessie Dickens died from her injuries on 14 December 1878 after having been thrown out of her carriage when a pony bolted. Alfred Dickens then moved to Melbourne, where he was persuaded by his younger brother Edward Dickens to start up their own stock and station agency, 'EBL Dickens and Partners'.

== Later years ==
In Melbourne on 22 June 1888, Dickens married again, his new wife, Emily Riley (1863–1913), being 17 years his junior. The marriage was not a happy one, and there were no children. Severely hit financially when depression hit Victoria in the early 1890s, Alfred began to tour Australia giving lectures about his father's life and work. From 1910 he gave the lectures in Europe and America, in that year returning to Great Britain for the first time since 1865. He became the Vice President of the Dickens Fellowship.

While touring America in 1912 as a guest of honour during the Dickens Centennial celebrations, Dickens was taken ill at noon while strolling in the lobby of his hotel, the Astor Hotel in New York City. Taking to his bed, he slept for a while and then awoke and dictated a letter to one of his daughters in Australia explaining that his sudden illness had required him to cancel one of his speaking engagements. He died at 5:15 p.m. in his suite at the Astor Hotel, reportedly of acute indigestion after a few hours illness.

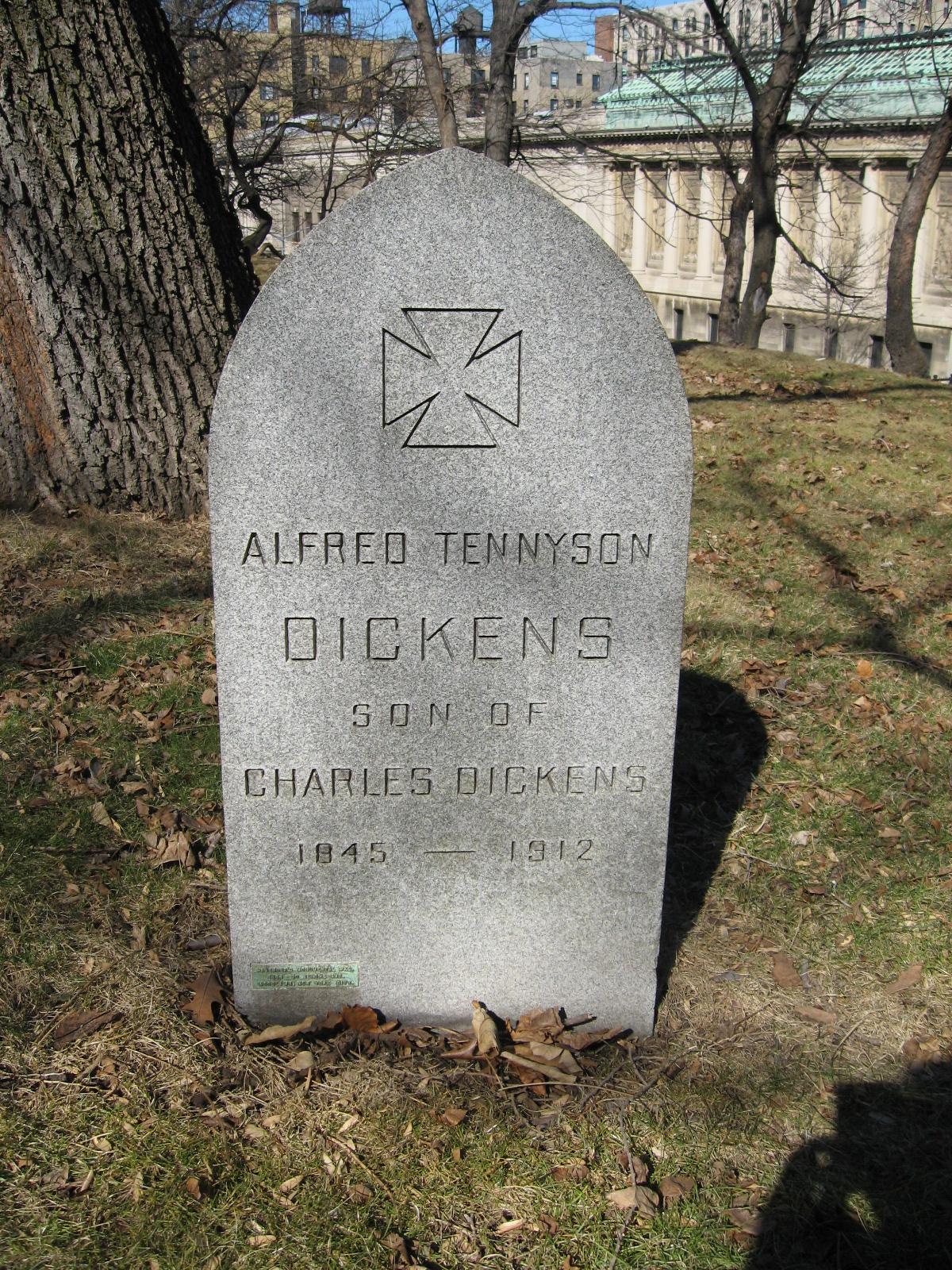
The grave of Alfred Dickens in Trinity Church Cemetery in Manhattan

He was buried in Trinity Church Cemetery in Manhattan on 14 April 1912 in a plot donated by the Trinity Corporation after his sister, Kate Perugini, had been contacted in London concerning the funeral arrangements. It had originally been thought that his body would be returned to England for burial. The funeral was attended by members of the American Dickens League, the Dickens Centenary Committee and other groups. In 1935 a permanent headstone of Barre, Vermont, granite was placed at the grave, the funds for which were collected by the children of the Church School of the Chapel of the Intercession. The lettering on the headstone is believed to be the same as that on Charles Dickens's grave in Westminster Abbey in London.

His brother, Henry Fielding Dickens, wrote of him, "He had been quite a stranger to the family from the time he went to Australia. He left two daughters, who came over to this country some years ago, and remain great favourites with all of us."

His name appears with those of his nine siblings on the monument next to his mother's grave in Highgate Cemetery in London.

== See also ==
- Dickens family
