= Catherine Dickens =

Spouse of Charles Dickens (1815–1879)

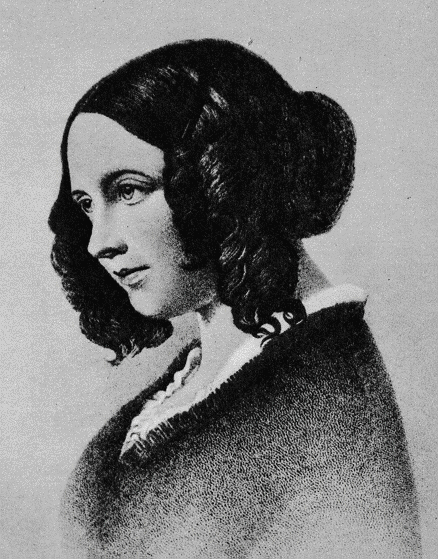
- Born: Catherine Thomson Hogarth; 19 May 1815; Edinburgh, Scotland
- Died: 22 November 1879 (aged 64); London, England
- Resting place: Highgate Cemetery, London, England
- Known for: Wife of English novelist Charles Dickens
- Spouse: Charles Dickens (m. 1836; sep. 1858)
- Children: Charles Culliford Boz Dickens; Mary Dickens; Kate Macready Dickens; Walter Landor Dickens; Francis Jeffrey Dickens; Alfred D'Orsay Tennyson Dickens; Sydney Smith Haldimand Dickens; Sir Henry Fielding Dickens; Dora Annie Dickens; Edward Dickens
- Parent: George Hogarth (father)
- Relatives: Georgina Hogarth (sister)

Catherine Thomson "Kate" Dickens (née Hogarth; 19 May 1815 – 22 November 1879) was a British author and purportedly a popular cook and author of a Victorian cookbook "What Shall We have For Dinner" under the pen name Lady Maria Clutterbuck. For about twenty years, she was married to the novelist Charles Dickens, during which time she kept up a large house and raised ten children. Following their highly public and very controversial separation, in 1858, Catherine was subjected to broader scrutiny in the press and increasingly defamed, many characterizations being, it was said, formed through her husband's public slander of her. Recent scholarly appraisals have tried to reinstate voice and agency to her, acknowledge her contributions to Victorian domestic culture, and reconsider the gendered dynamics of her marriage.

== Early life ==
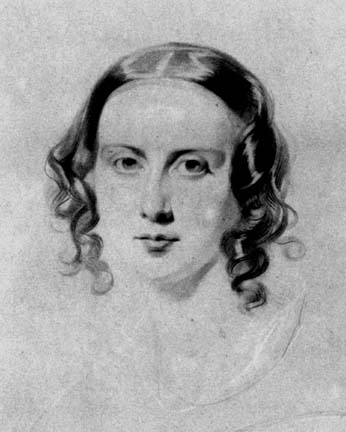
Catherine Dickens by Samuel Lawrence (1838)

Catherine Hogarth was born in Edinburgh, Scotland, in 1815, the eldest of ten children of her parents, George Hogarth and Georgina Thomson. In 1824, the family moved to England, eventually settling in London.

Catherine was from a media-literate family. Her father, George, was a respected journalist, music critic, and former lawyer who wrote for publications such as the Edinburgh Courant and later the Morning Chronicle. Through his work in journalism and the arts, Catherine was immersed from a young age in a vibrant intellectual and cultural environment. Her early life was shaped by exposure to literary, musical, and theatrical circles, which likely inspired her later pursuits in writing and domestic authorship.

== Education and literary work ==
The education given to Catherine Hogarth was middle-class and typical for daughters of professional men in early 19th-century Britain. Records of her schooling, however, remain scarce. The very environment that made her culturally fluent logically contributed to her development: an atmosphere where literacy and art were appreciated. Her father was George Hogarth, a journalist and music critic who had also been a lawyer. Hogarth's household entertained literary and artistic associations in Edinburgh and London.

Catherine published "What Shall We Have for Dinner?" under the pseudonym "Lady Maria Clutterbuck" in 1851. It is a domestic manual, with plans for meals and information on house management, intended for middle-class women who wished to keep up with domestic expectations during Victorian times. It was often dismissed as a mere cookbook, but nowadays scholars have raised the profile of this work as not only entertaining but also socially aware and as promoting the performance of domestic femininity while simultaneously representing a slight undermining of that construct.

The book had moderate success, going into several editions. Apart from that, it takes the unusual perspective of a real woman with first-hand experience into the working life, social expectations, and humor of Victorian womanhood.

== Marriage ==
Dickens immediately took a liking to the 19-year-old Catherine and invited her to his 23rd birthday party. She was attractive, intelligent, kind, and a gifted musician. Catherine and Dickens became engaged in 1835 and he had his likeness painted on ivory by Rose Emma Drummond as an engagement present. They were married on 2 April 1836 in St Luke's Church, Chelsea, going on their honeymoon in Chalk, near Chatham in Kent and setting up a home in Bloomsbury.

She became pregnant almost immediately and the couple went on to have ten children over the next 15 years, and at least two miscarriages. During that period, Charles wrote that even if he were to become rich and famous, he would never be as happy as he was in that small flat with Catherine.

Catherine's sister, Mary Hogarth, entered Dickens's Doughty Street household to offer support to her newly married sister and brother-in-law. It was usual for an unwed sister of a wife to live with and help a newly married couple. Dickens became very attached to Mary, with historians debating the nature of the relationship, and she died in his arms after a brief illness in 1837. She became a character in many of his books, and her death is fictionalised as the death of Little Nell.

Catherine's younger sister, Georgina Hogarth, joined the Dickens family household in 1842 when Dickens and Catherine sailed to the United States, caring for the young family they had left behind. During their trip, Dickens wrote in a letter to a friend that Catherine never felt gloomy or lost courage throughout their long journey by ship, and "adapted to any circumstances without complaint". In 1845, Charles Dickens produced the amateur theatrical Every Man in his Humour for the benefit of Leigh Hunt. In a subsequent performance, Catherine, who had a minor role, fell through a trap door.

In 1851, as "Lady Maria Clutterbuck", Catherine published a cookery book, What Shall we Have for Dinner? Satisfactorily Answered by Numerous Bills of Fare for from Two to Eighteen Persons. It contained many suggested menus for meals of varying complexity together with a few recipes. It went through several editions until 1860. Also in 1851, she allegedly had a nervous breakdown after the death of her daughter, Dora Annie Dickens, aged seven months.

== Separation ==
Portrait of Catherine Dickens c. 1847 by Daniel Maclise

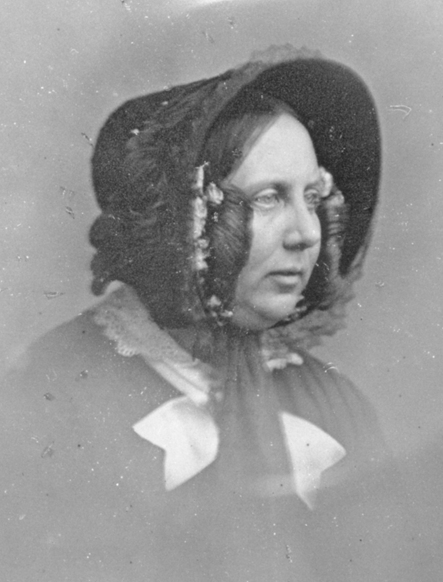
Daguerreotype, taken in 1852

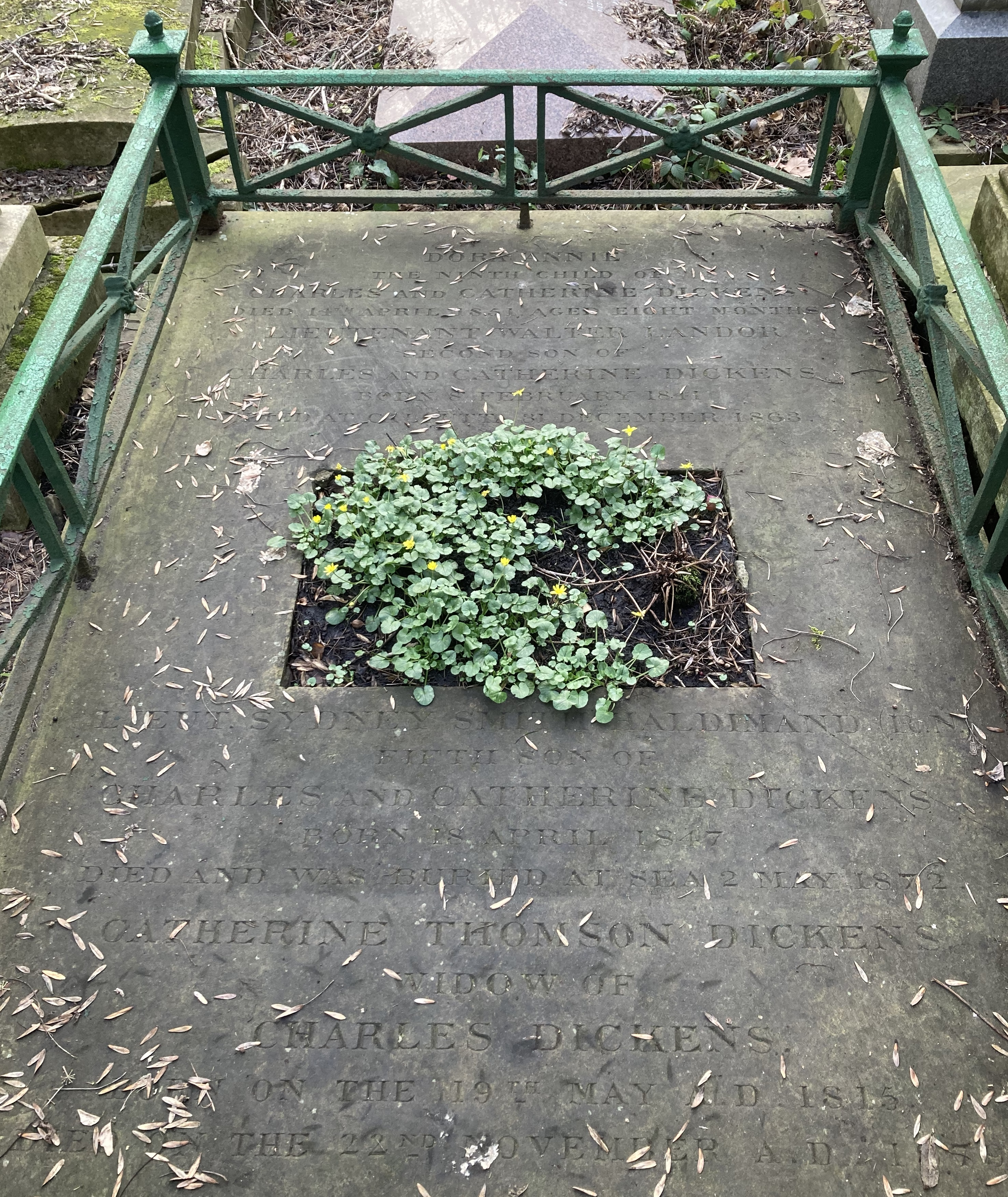
Family grave of Catherine Dickens in Highgate Cemetery (west side)

Over the subsequent years, Dickens claimed Catherine became an increasingly incompetent mother and housekeeper. He also blamed her for the birth of their ten children, which caused him financial worries. He had hoped to have no more after the birth of their fourth child Walter, and he claimed that her coming from a large family had caused so many children to be born. To ensure no more children could be born, he ordered their bed to be separated and put a bookshelf in between them, then completely moved out of their bedroom and had the connecting door boarded shut.

He tried to have her diagnosed as mentally ill so that she would be committed to an asylum. In May 1858, Charles and Catherine Dickens separated, and she moved into a property on Gloucester Crescent in Camden Town. They arranged the terms of their separation by deed instead of a court hearing. She had no custody rights to her children under English law, but was promised "free access to all or any of her children at all places" in the deed.

The cause of the separation is unknown, although attention at the time and since has focused on rumours of an affair between Dickens and Ellen Ternan and/or Catherine's sister, Georgina Hogarth. A bracelet intended for Ellen Ternan had supposedly been delivered to the Dickens household some months previously, leading to accusation and denial. Dickens's friend, William Makepeace Thackeray, asserted that Dickens's separation from Catherine was due to a liaison with Ternan, rather than with Georgina Hogarth as had been put to him. This remark coming to Dickens's attention, Dickens was so infuriated that it almost put an end to the Dickens–Thackeray friendship.

Many other friends, relations and society figures commented on the separation, with most supporting Catherine and rallying to her defence. Elizabeth Barrett Browning called Dickens's treatment of his wife "criminal" and the peeress and philanthropist Angela Burdett Coutts, Dickens's old friend, eventually broke off their friendship over the separation. Contemporaries also praised Catherine for her "ladylike" silence and dignity, as she did not speak one harsh word in public about her husband’s treatment. Georgina, Charles and all of the children except Charles Dickens Jr., remained in their home at Tavistock House, while Catherine and Charles Jr. moved out. Georgina Hogarth ran Dickens's household. On 12 June 1858, Dickens published an article in his journal, Household Words, denying rumours about the separation while neither articulating them nor clarifying the situation.

Some domestic trouble of mine, of long-standing, on which I will make no further remark than that it claims to be respected, as being of a sacredly private nature, has lately been brought to an arrangement, which involves no anger or ill-will of any kind, and the whole origin, progress, and surrounding circumstances of which have been, throughout, within the knowledge of my children. It is amicably composed, and its details have now to be forgotten by those concerned in it ... By some means, arising out of wickedness, or out of folly, or out of inconceivable wild chance, or out of all three, this trouble has been the occasion of misrepresentations, mostly grossly false, most monstrous, and most cruel – involving, not only me, but innocent persons dear to my heart ... I most solemnly declare, then – and this I do both in my own name and in my wife's name – that all the lately whispered rumours touching the trouble, at which I have glanced, are abominably false. And whosoever repeats one of them after this denial, will lie as wilfully and as foully as it is possible for any false witness to lie, before heaven and earth.

He sent this statement to the newspapers, including The Times, and many reprinted it. He fell out with Bradbury and Evans, his publishers, because they refused to publish his statement in Punch as they thought it unsuitable for a humorous periodical. Another public statement appeared in the New York Tribune, which later found its way into several British newspapers. In this statement, Dickens declared that it had been only Georgina Hogarth who had held the family together for some time:

... I will merely remark of [my wife] that some peculiarity of her character has thrown all the children on someone else. I do not know – I cannot by any stretch of fancy imagine – what would have become of them but for this aunt, who has grown up with them, to whom they are devoted, and who has sacrificed the best part of her youth and life to them. She has remonstrated, reasoned, suffered, and toiled, again and again, to prevent a separation between Mrs. Dickens and me. Mrs. Dickens has often expressed to her sense of affectionate care and devotion in her home – never more strongly than within the last twelve months.

The separation, and Dickens's rewriting of it (and the couple’s marriage), would shape how Catherine would be seen up until her death in 1879, and in the following decades.

== Later years ==
Dickens and Catherine had little correspondence after their separation, communicating by letter only three times and meeting only once, accidentally, outside a theatre. In 1864, their son Walter Landor Dickens died in Calcutta, India, and Angela Burdett Coutts encouraged Dickens to write to Catherine after his death. He would not and wrote back to Coutts that: "a page in my life which once had writing on it, has become absolutely blank, and it is not in my power to pretend that it has a solitary word upon it".

To add insult to injury, Dickens also did not honour the clause in their separation deed about allowing Catherine access to her children. Their daughter Kate later described how Dickens would "reproach" her for visiting her mother. Dickens arranged for their sons to take up jobs in the British colonies without consulting their mother, and Catherine was deeply upset by their departures from England. Their son Sydney Smith Haldimand Dickens, a sub-lieutenant in the Royal Navy, nevertheless chose to live with his mother during his periods of leave.

== Death ==
While on her deathbed in 1879, Catherine gave her collection of Dickens' letters to her daughter Kate, telling her to "Give these to the British Museum – that the world may know [Charles] loved me once". Shirley Brooks reflected in her diary that Catherine "was resolved not to allow... any biographer to allege that she did not make D[ickens] a happy husband". She died of cancer and was buried in Highgate Cemetery in London with her infant daughter Dora, who had died in 1851, aged seven months. Her grave is far from Dickens' own grave in Westminster Abbey.

== In literature and media ==
'Mrs Dickens', a novel by Emily Howes, tells the story of Catherine Dickens' life and marriage to Charles, and was published in June 2026.

Catherine Dickens was the subject of the sixty-minute BBC Two documentary Mrs Dickens' Family Christmas, broadcast on 30 December 2011 and performed and presented by Sue Perkins, and which looked at the marriage of Charles Dickens through the eyes of Catherine.

In the 1976 TV series Dickens of London, she was portrayed by Adrienne Burgess.

In the 2013 film The Invisible Woman, she was portrayed by Joanna Scanlan.

In the 2017 film The Man Who Invented Christmas, she was portrayed by Morfydd Clark.

== Bibliography ==
- Nayder, Lillian (2011). The Other Dickens: A Life of Catherine Hogarth, Ithaca, New York: Cornell University Press, ISBN 978-0-8014-4787-7. Disputes Charles Dickens' claim that Catherine was an unfit wife and mother.
- Howes, Emily (2026). London: Phoenix, ISBN 978-1399610834. Novel centred on the life of Catherine Dickens.
