= Kate Perugini =

English Victorian-era painter and child of Charles Dickens (1839–1929)

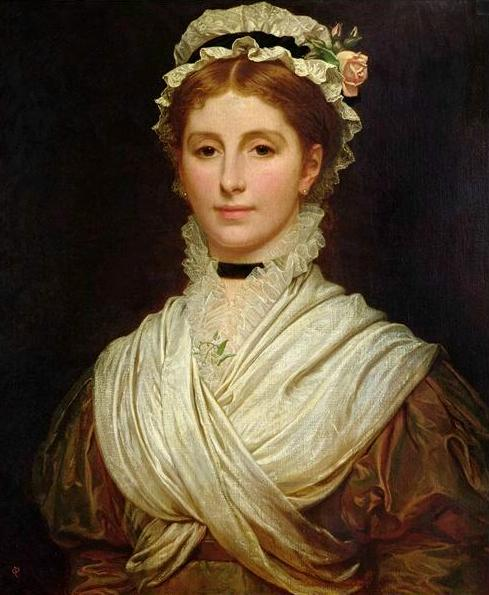
- Charles Perugini's portrait of his wife Kate
- Born: Catherine Elizabeth Macready Dickens; 29 October 1839; London, England
- Died: 9 May 1929 (aged 89); London, England
- Known for: Painting
- Spouses: Charles Allston Collins (m. 1860; died 1873) Charles Edward Perugini (m. 1873; died 1918)
- Children: 1
- Parents: Charles Dickens; Catherine Hogarth

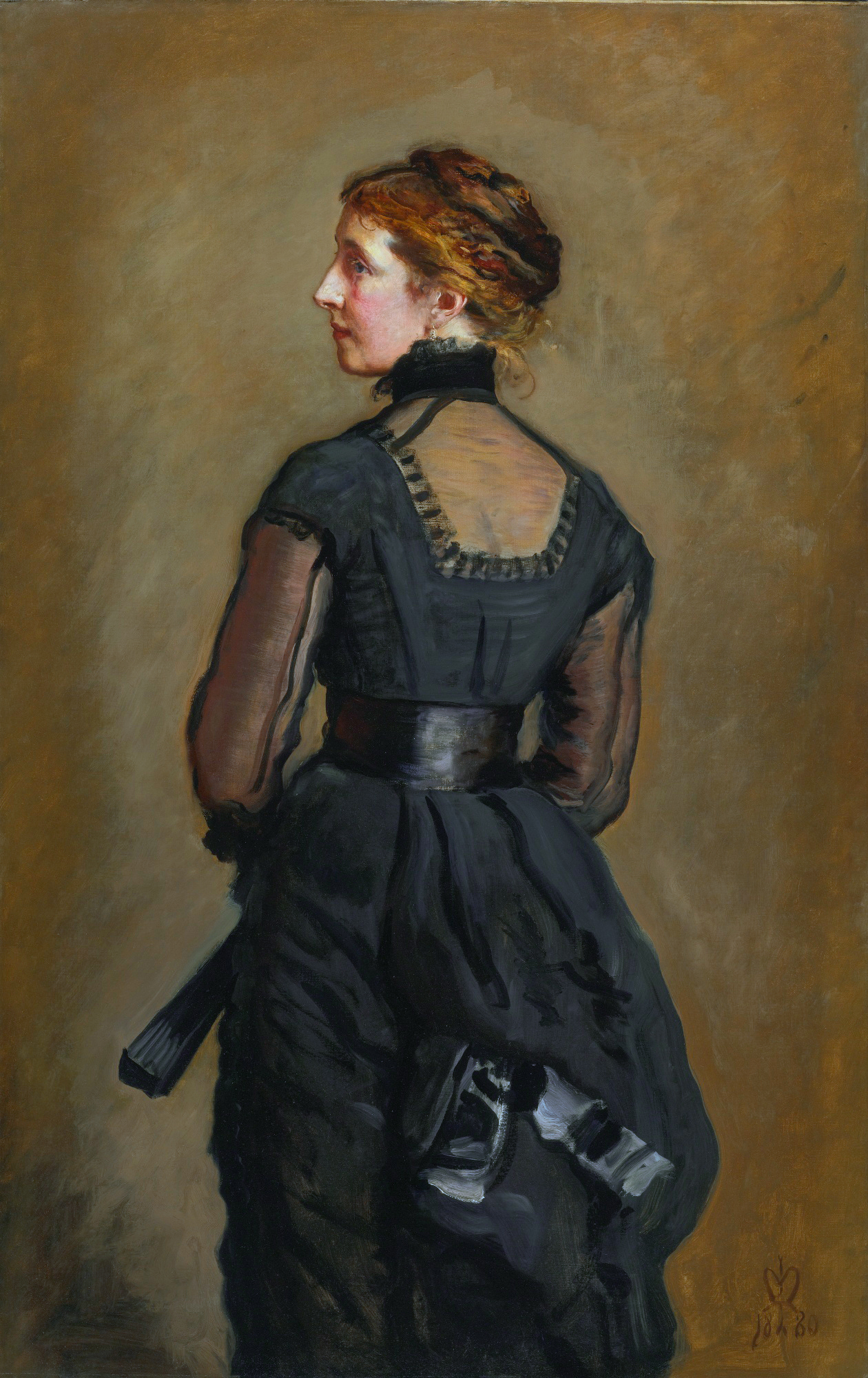
Portrait of Mrs Kate Perugini (1880) by John Everett Millais

Catherine Elizabeth Macready Perugini (née Dickens; 29 October 1839 – 9 May 1929) was an English painter of the Victorian era and the daughter of Catherine Dickens and Charles Dickens.

== Biography ==
Born Catherine Dickens and nicknamed Kate or Katey, she was Charles Dickens's youngest surviving daughter, and according to her siblings her father's favourite child. Dickens reportedly named her after his friend, the actor William Macready. As a girl, she also bore the nickname "Lucifer Box" for her hot temper.

She travelled widely with her family as a child, and performed in her father's elaborate amateur theatrical productions – including the 1857 performance of Wilkie Collins's The Frozen Deep before Queen Victoria. In 1858, her parents separated and the children remained with their father. The reason for the separation remains unclear, though rumours have focused on the close relationship between Charles Dickens and Ellen Ternan, an actress many years his junior, and/or Georgina Hogarth.

Her first husband was the artist and author Charles Allston Collins, younger brother of Wilkie Collins; they were married on 17 July 1860. Perugini reportedly had an affair with Valentine Prinsep during her marriage to Collins. After his death from cancer in 1873, Kate married another artist, Charles Edward Perugini. The couple married in secret in 1873, then had an official ceremony in 1874. She and Perugini had one child, Leonard Ralph Dickens Perugini. He died on 24 July 1876, at the age of seven months. The Peruginis were active in artistic society and maintained friendships with J. M. Barrie and George Bernard Shaw amongst other celebrities of their era. Like her first husband, she pursued literary endeavours along with her painting.

Kate was the primary source of information used by biographer Gladys Storey for her book Dickens and Daughter, which revealed Dickens's affair with the actress Ellen Ternan. Supporters of Charles Dickens attacked the book as being unreliable, especially the passages about Ellen Ternan and the birth of a child. However, George Bernard Shaw wrote to The Times Literary Supplement to say that Kate had told him everything in the book forty years before.

Charles Perugini died in 1918 and was buried alongside his baby son. Kate survived her husband by ten years, dying at the age of 89. One of the causes of death listed on her death certificate was "exhaustion."

== Career ==
At the age of 12, Kate Dickens began studying art at Bedford College, the first institution of higher learning for women in Britain. She became a successful painter of portraits and genre paintings, sometimes collaborating with her husband Charles Perugini. Kate sought to distinguish herself from her father, refusing to be associated only with his fame.

In 1880 Sir John Everett Millais painted her in one of his "most striking portraits." It was exhibited at the Grosvenor Gallery Summer Exhibition in 1881. This painting depicts Perugini standing with her back to the painter but profiling her distinctive features. The portrait of Perugini, who had also exhibited at the Grosvenor Gallery was a wedding gift by Millais, presented on her marriage to Charles Perugini. It is an example of Millais' later style of portraiture that is looser, more luscious and sketch-like than the naturalism of the Pre-Raphaelite Brotherhood. In showing the picture at the Grosvenor, "Perugini advertised herself as part of a cultured, educated and artistic family" Millais had previously used her as a model for his painting The Black Brunswicker (1860).

A portrait painter, she started exhibiting her works at the Royal Academy shows in 1877. She also regularly exhibited her work at the Society of Watercolour Painters and the Society of Lady Artists. Perugini sent three works to the Grosvenor Gallery between 1880 and 1882. One entitled Civettina (1880) is an Italian genre painting depicting a half-length portrait of a girl in profile, with her back to the viewer as in her own portrait by Millais. Perugini exhibited her work at the Palace of Fine Arts and The Woman's Building at the 1893 World's Columbian Exposition in Chicago, Illinois.

Perugini is particularly known for her portraits of children, which include: A Little Woman (1879), Feeding Rabbits (1884), Dorothy de Michele (1892), and A Flower Merchant.

== Bibliography ==
- Gladys Storey, (1939) Dickens and Daughter, Frederick Muller, reprinted New York, Haskell House, 1971 – memoir by a close friend
- Lucinda Hawksley, (2006) Katey: The Life and Loves of Dickens's Artist Daughter, Doubleday, London, England.ISBN 978-0385607421
- Lucinda Hawksley, (2013) Charles Dickens' Favorite Daughter: The Life, Loves, and Art of Katey Dickens Perugini, Globe Pequot Press, USA ISBN 978-0762785216
- Lucinda Hawksley, (2018) Dickens's Artistic Daughter Katey: Her Life, Loves & Impact, Pen & Sword History, London ASIN B07H3V71YR

== Illustrations of works ==
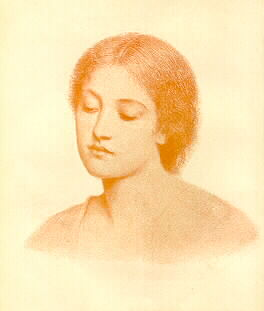

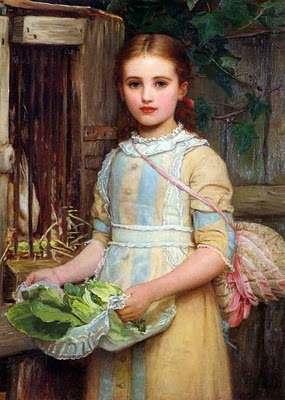

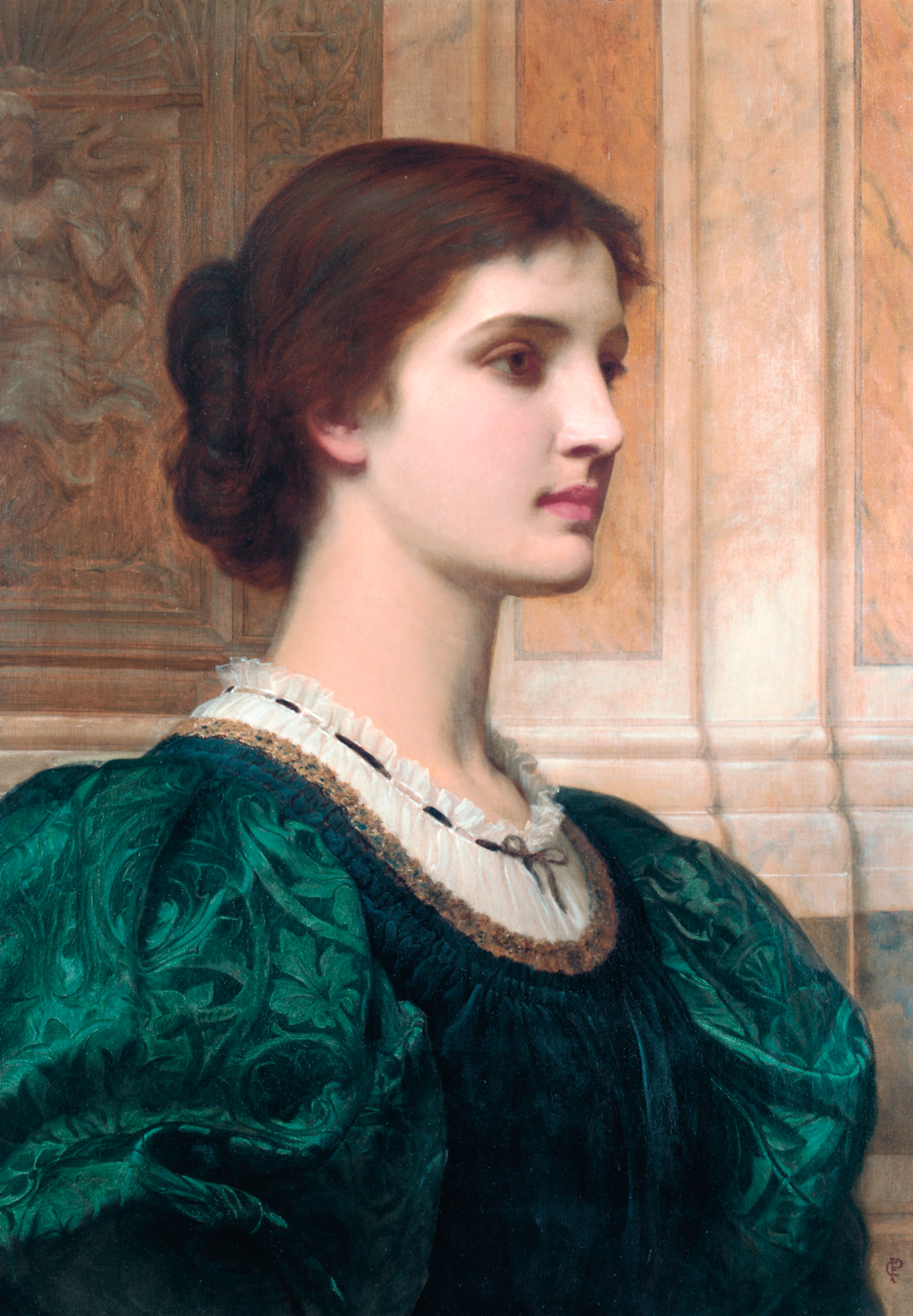

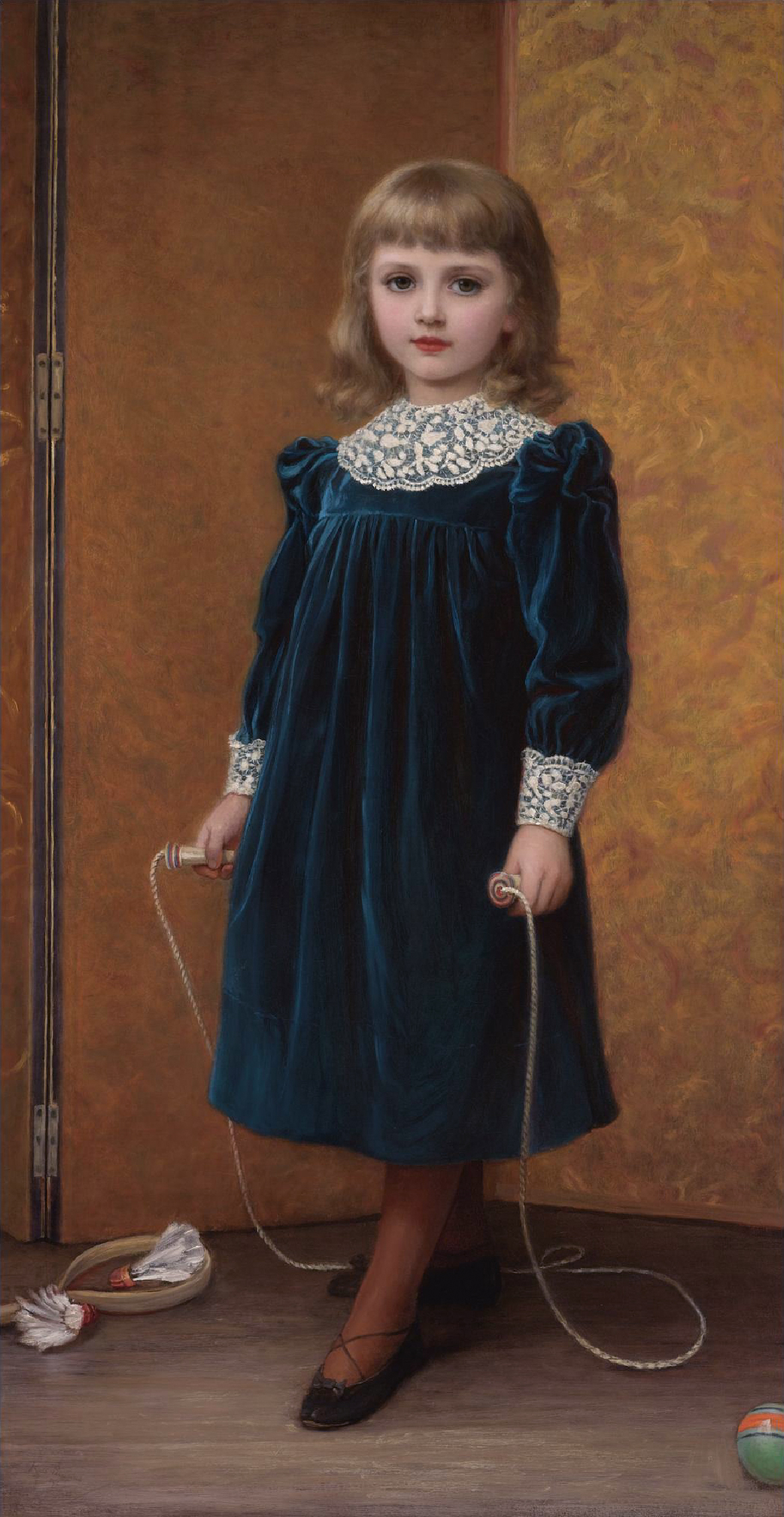

== See also ==
- Dickens family
