= Henry Fielding Dickens =

English barrister and son of Charles Dickens (1849–1933)

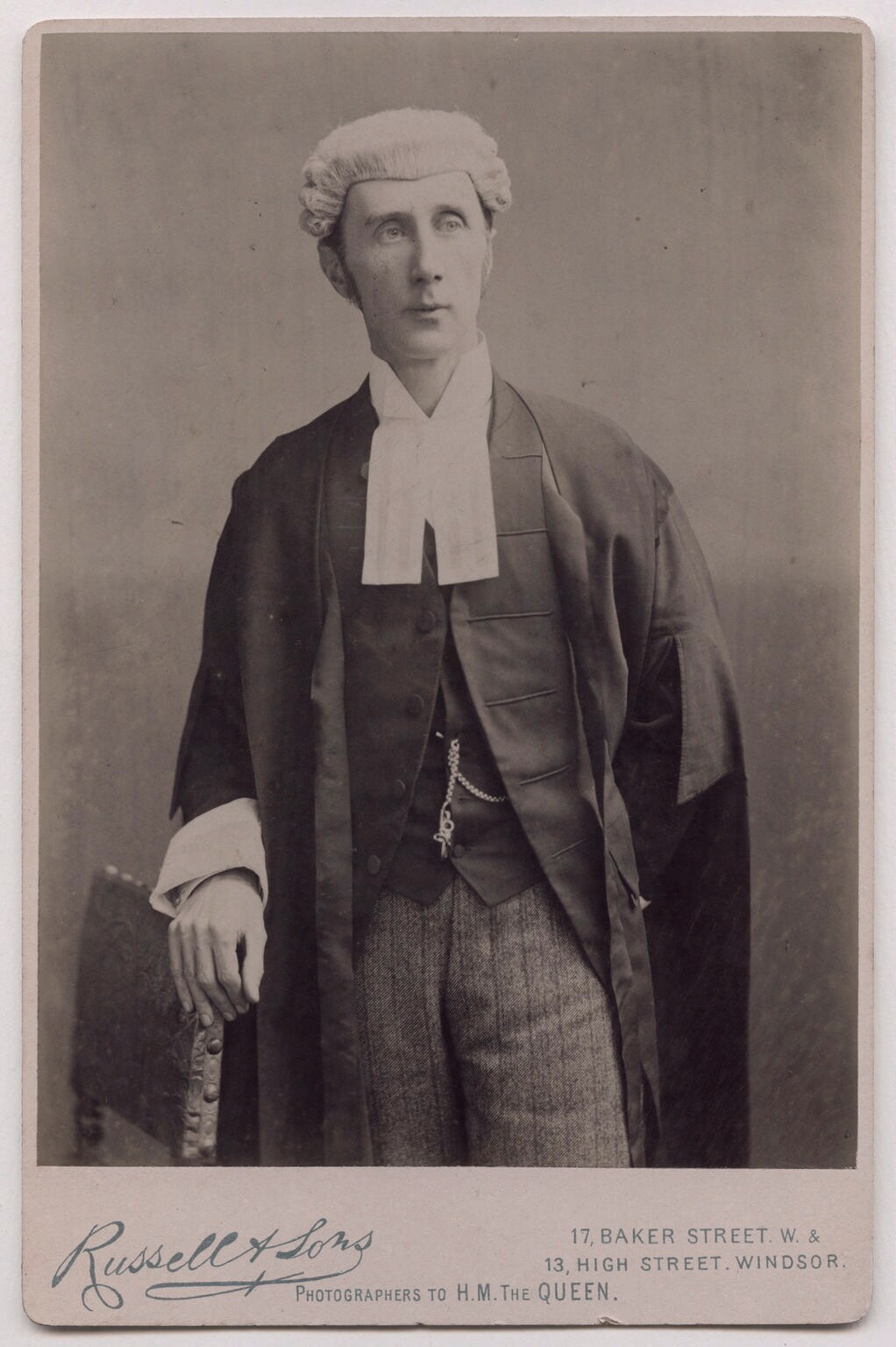
- Henry Fielding Dickens in the 1890s
- Born: 16 January 1849; London, England
- Died: 21 December 1933 (aged 84); London, England
- Occupation: Common Serjeant of London
- Spouse: Marie Roche
- Children: 7
- Parent(s): Charles Dickens; Catherine Hogarth

Sir Henry Fielding Dickens, KC (16 January 1849 – 21 December 1933) was an English barrister, who served as a KC and Common Serjeant of London. He was the eighth of ten children born to English author Charles Dickens and his wife Catherine, and the last surviving child of Dickens.

== Early life ==
Baptised in St Marylebone Parish Church in London on 21 April 1849, Henry Fielding Dickens was named after Henry Fielding, one of his father's favourite authors. His father had originally thought to name him after Oliver Goldsmith, but thinking that his son would constantly be teased as "Oliver asking for more", he changed his mind. His family nicknames were 'H', 'Mr Harry', and 'Mr H'. While a boy living at Gads Hill Place, his father's country home, he, with his brother Edward, started the 'Gad's Hill Gazette', a family newspaper printed on a small printing press given to him by Mr Wills, the sub-editor of All the Year Round. His father, Charles Dickens, and Henry Fothergill Chorley were contributors. Dickens was educated at Wimbledon School at Wimbledon and at Mr Gibson's boarding school in Boulogne-sur-Mer, along with his brothers Alfred and Sydney. He became the only one of Dickens's seven sons to attend university.

== Legal career ==
He attended Trinity Hall, Cambridge, from 1868, graduating BA in mathematics (29th Wrangler) in 1872 before studying law at the university. Of that period at Cambridge, Dickens later wrote:

Looking back now upon the years that are gone, I find that there are one or two scenes or incidents which arise with astonishing vividness to my mind that may be worth recording ... I hope it will not be thought that I tell this story vaingloriously, as it was but a small matter so far as I was concerned. Nothing is farther from my thoughts. I do so because it is typical of a strange reticence on [my father's] part, an intense dislike of 'letting himself go' in private life or of using language which might be deemed strained or over-effusive; though, as will be seen later, when he was deeply moved he was at no pains to hide the depth of his emotion. Thus it came about that, though his children knew he was devotedly attached to them, there was still a kind of reserve on his part which seemed occasionally to come as a cloud between us and which I never quite understood.

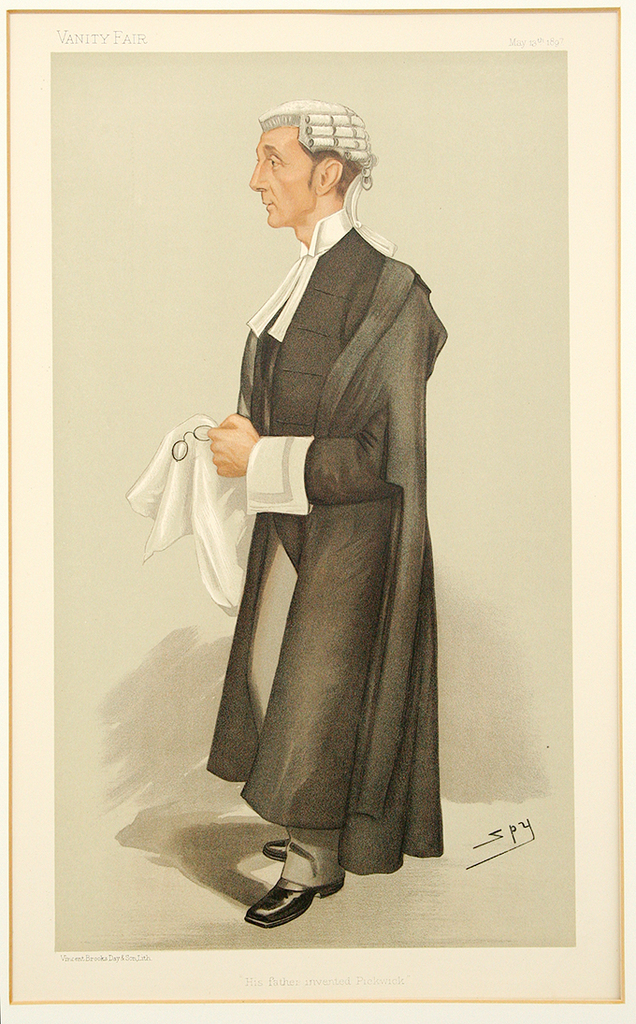
Dickens by 'Spy' in Vanity Fair in 1897

In the year 1869, after I had been at college about a year, I was fortunate enough to gain one of the principal scholarships at Trinity Hall, Cambridge – not a great thing, only 50 pounds a year; but I knew that this success, slight as it was, would give him intense pleasure, so I went to meet him at Higham Station upon his arrival from London to tell him of it. As he got out of the train I told him the news. He said, 'Capital! capital!' – nothing more. Disappointed to find that he received the news apparently so lightly, I took my seat beside him in the pony carriage he was driving. Nothing more happened until we had got half-way to Gad's Hill, when he broke down completely. Turning towards me with tears in his eyes and giving me a warm grip of the hand, he said, 'God bless you, my boy; God bless you!' That pressure of the hand I can feel now as distinctly as I felt it then, and it will remain as strong and real until the day of my death.

In 1873 he was called to the bar, and in 1892 he was appointed Queen's Counsel. In 1899, he became a bencher of the Inner Temple. Sir Henry's best recalled case was his defence of Kitty Byron for the murder of her lover in 1902. Although she was convicted, Dickens's defence was so spirited that she was given a reduced prison sentence due to public petition.

For some years he was the Recorder for Deal and Maidstone in Kent. His interests included fencing, and he was the first President of the Chatham Yachting Club. He succeeded Sir Frederick Albert Bosanquet as Common Serjeant of London in November 1917, an ancient office first recorded in 1291 with the appointment of Thomas Juvenal, and the second most senior judicial position at the Old Bailey after the Recorder of London. As Common Serjeant, Dickens judged criminal trials at the Old Bailey for over 15 years, retiring on 18 October 1932. He was succeeded by Cecil Whiteley, KC.

On one occasion, Dickens was judging a case when the male prisoner interrupted him by saying "You ain't a patch on your father." "I quite agree with you. What do you know of my father?" Dickens replied. The prisoner, who had spent most of his life in prison, answered "Well, I have read some in prison." "Have you?", Dickens replied, "That's capital; for you will now have eighteen months in which to resume your studies." He repeatedly refused nominations for election to Parliament, believing it would adversely affect his legal practice.

== Later years ==
At family Christmas gatherings at his home at 8 Mulberry Walk in London, he performed imitations of his father giving his famous "Readings", during which he would wear a geranium, his father's favourite flower, and lean on the same velvet-covered reading stand used by Charles Dickens during his reading tours. He had listened to his father many times, and older members of his audience said Henry Dickens's performances were amazingly like those given by his father. To celebrate his eightieth birthday in 1929 he went through the whole of A Christmas Carol without a hitch, his false teeth loosening at the melodramatic sections: 'I know him – Marley's ghosht!'.

From October 1914 he performed the recitals of his father's works in support of the Red Cross Society. These included excerpts from David Copperfield, A Christmas Carol, The Chimes, and The Cricket on the Hearth. Through his efforts he raised £1,200 for the Society. He was a Life President of the Dickens Fellowship.

== Personal life ==
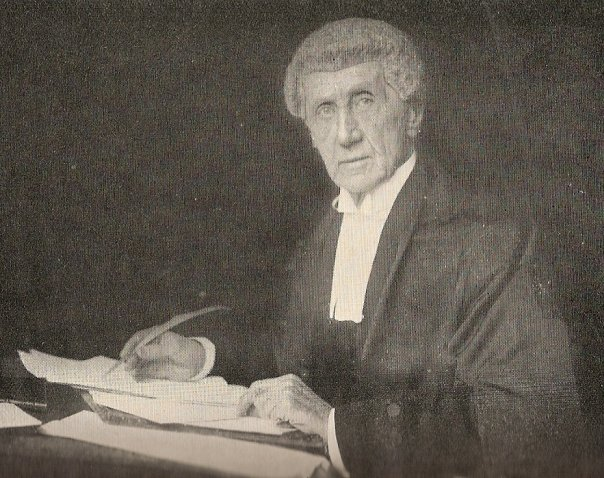
Sir Henry Dickens, KC, as Common Serjeant of London

Henry 'Harry' Dickens married Marie Roche (1852–1940), the daughter of Monsieur Antonin Roche, and the granddaughter of Czech Jewish composer and piano virtuoso Ignaz Moscheles, on 25 October 1876, in Portman Square in London; they had four sons and three daughters together. Within the Dickens family the couple were known as 'The Guvnor' and 'The Mater'. Their son Philip Charles Dickens is buried beside them in Putney Vale Cemetery in London, while a second son, Henry Charles Dickens, was the father of the author Monica Dickens. Henry Charles was a long serving member of Kensington Council in London where he was very active in improving housing in the poorer part of the borough after World War II; a block of flats in North Kensington is named after him. On his retirement when the borough was amalgamated with Chelsea in 1955 he was created an honorary Freeman. A third son, Cedric 'Ceddy' Dickens, fell in action at the Battle of the Somme in World War I.

Dickens was also the father of Admiral Sir Gerald Charles Dickens and the grandfather of Cedric Charles Dickens, an author and the steward of Charles Dickens's literary legacy. He is the great-grandfather of actor and performer Gerald Dickens and the great-great-grandfather of biographer and writer Lucinda Hawksley and actor Harry Lloyd.

Dickens was appointed a Knight Bachelor in 1922, and retired in August 1932. He died at St. Luke's Hospital, Chelsea, in 1933, five days after being hit by a motorcyclist while crossing Chelsea Embankment at his usual place and by his usual method of warning motorists by holding up his walking stick and stepping out into the road. He was the last surviving child of Charles Dickens.

Henry Fielding Dickens was buried in Putney Vale Cemetery.

== See also ==
- Dickens family

== Publications ==
- Memories of My Father Gollancz, London (1928)
- The Recollections of Sir Henry Dickens, K.C. William Heinemann Ltd (1934).
