= Cedric Charles Dickens =

English author and descendant of Charles Dickens

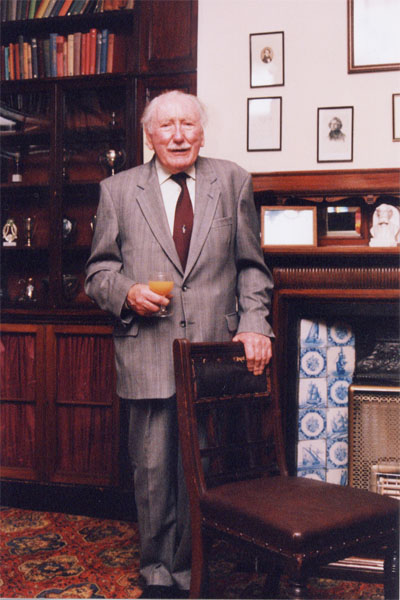
Cedric Charles Dickens in 2005

Cedric David Charles Dickens (24 September 1916 – 11 February 2006) was an English author and businessman, a great-grandson of Charles Dickens and the steward of his literary legacy. He was a lifelong supporter of the Charles Dickens Museum in Holborn, London, and twice President of the Dickens Fellowship.

== Biography ==
Dickens was the son of Philip "Pip" Charles Dickens, a chartered accountant and the first secretary of ICI. He was the grandson of Sir Henry Fielding Dickens, the eighth of Dickens's ten children, a Common Serjeant of London, and the nephew of Admiral Sir Gerald Charles Dickens. He attended Eton and Trinity Hall, Cambridge, graduating in Law in 1935. After three trips to the Caribbean by banana boat, Dickens joined the British Tabulating Machine Company in 1937.

Dickens joined the RNVR on the outbreak of World War II in 1939, leaving the Royal Navy in 1946 as a first lieutenant. While serving in Portsmouth, he met his wife, Elizabeth Mary Blake (1913–2008), who was a WREN. They married in 1948.

After leaving the Royal Navy, Dickens returned to his old firm, which eventually became ICL, of which he became Director of Communication.

Dickens was a lifelong supporter of the Charles Dickens Museum in Holborn, and twice President of the Dickens Fellowship, a worldwide association, first taking the position on the death of his father, and again on his retirement in 1976, when he also founded the international Dickens Pickwick Club. This he kept true to the spirit of The Pickwick Papers by allowing only men to join, which led in 2000 to an accusation of sexism.

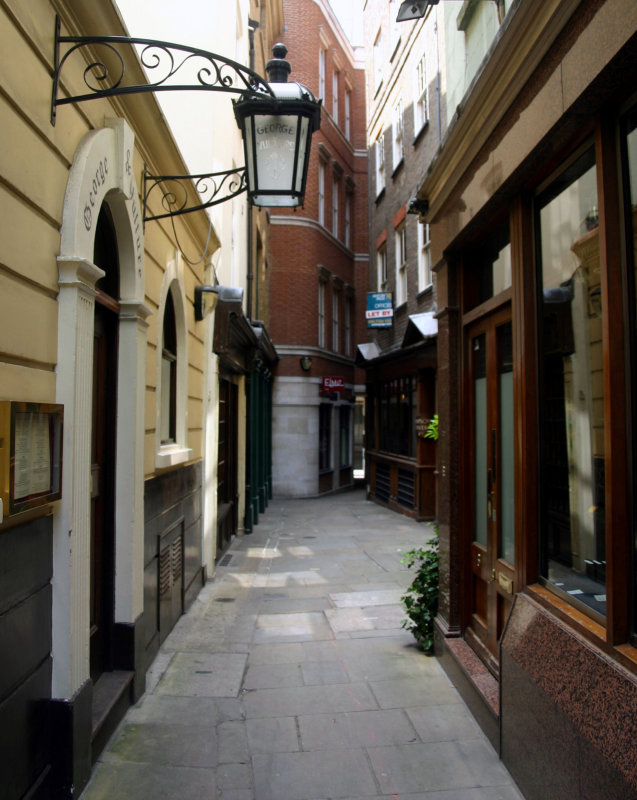
Dickens campaigned to save the George and Vulture inn.

In demand internationally as a guest and speaker at meetings of Dickens Fellowships and similar events, he also worked to preserve the heritage of the George and Vulture in the City of London, frequently mentioned in The Pickwick Papers, but then threatened with demolition. Charles Dickens himself had often drunk there. He also associated himself with Gads Hill Place in Kent, Dicken's final home, becoming a governor of Gad's Hill School, which occupies the building today. In 2005, he appeared in the first episode of BBC Four's documentary series Dickens in America with Miriam Margolyes, when he talked about what it was like growing up as a member of the Dickens family.

Dickens suffered a severe stroke after emergency surgery and died on 11 February 2006, aged 89. His autobiography, My Life, appeared in 2016 to mark the centenary of his birth. This was assembled from Dickens's own writings by his daughter, Jane Monk, and Marion Dickens Lloyd, introduced by Margolyes and launched at the Charles Dickens Museum in September 2016.

== Publications ==
- Christmas With Dickens: The Dickens' Family's 150th Anniversary Gift of a Christmas Carol for Modern-Day Families at Yuletide, by Cedric Charles Dickens, David Dickens and Betty Dickens. Belvedere Press (1993)
- The Sayings of Charles Dickens, Cedric Charles Dickens (editor). Gerald Duckworth & Co. Ltd (2006)
- Drinking with Dickens, Cedric Charles Dickens. New Amsterdam Books (1980)
- The "George and Vulture" in Pickwick Papers, Cedric Charles Dickens. Dickens Publishing (1995)
- The Miracle of Pickwick or... the Goodness of Pickwickedness, Cedric Charles Dickens & Alan S. Watts. Dickens Publishing (2001)
- Dining with Dickens, Cedric Charles Dickens. Elvendon Press (1984)

== See also ==
- Dickens family
