= Dickens House Museum, Broadstairs =

Literary museum in Broadstairs, Kent, England

Coordinates: 51°21′30″N 1°26′32″E

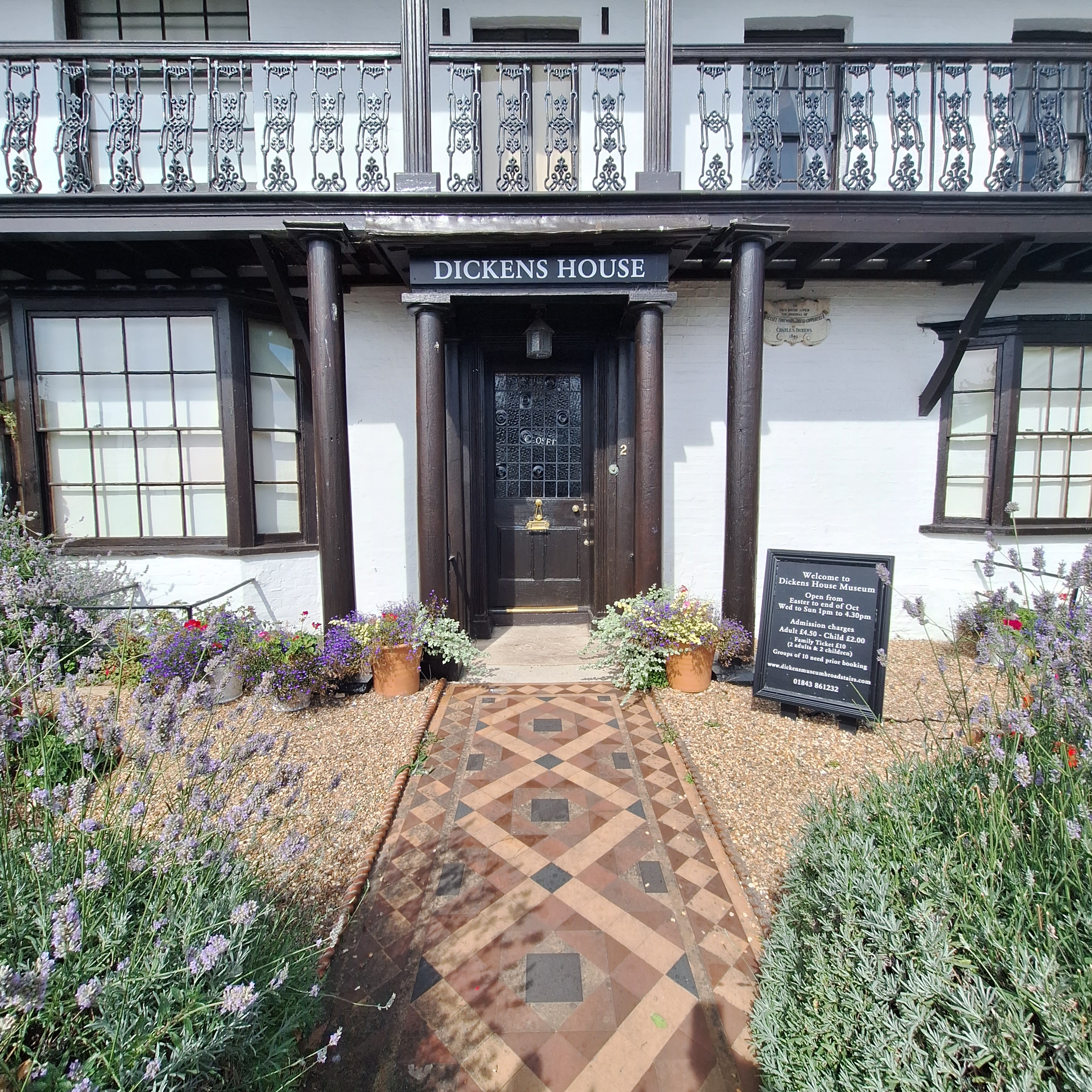
Dickens House Museum (2025), the home of Mary Pearson Strong, the inspiration for the Dickens character Betsey Trotwood

The Dickens House Museum is a literary museum exploring the life and works of Charles Dickens, concentrating on the time he spent in Broadstairs and the works he wrote there. It is housed in a late-Georgian cottage situated on Victoria Parade, Broadstairs, Kent, United Kingdom.

== Link with Charles Dickens ==
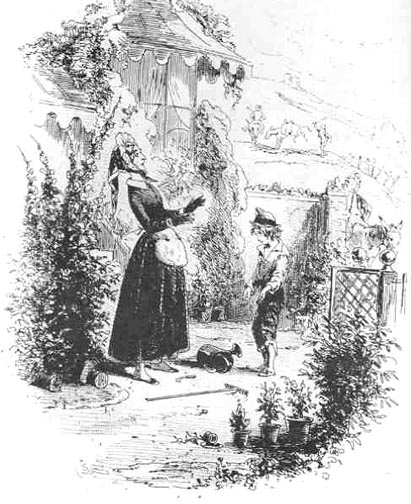
Betsey Trotwood standing with a young David Copperfield outside her cottage, an illustration by Hablot Knight "Phiz" Browne from David Copperfield (1850)

Dickens House, originally 2 Nuckell's Place, was the home of Mary Pearson Strong (1768–1855), who was the inspiration for Betsey Trotwood, the saviour aunt of the eponymous subject of Charles Dickens's novel David Copperfield. Strong inherited the house from her sister Ann in the late 1830s, around the same time that the Dickens family started having an annual holiday in Broadstairs, often staying a few doors away on Albion Street.

Dickens became a regular visitor to the Strong household, sometimes bringing his eldest child, Charlie (Charles Dickens Jr.), for afternoon tea. Charlie would reminisce many years later that Mary Pearson Strong was a "charming old lady"; however, Strong was not without her eccentricities. One of these was her self-declared right to chase donkeys, used for transporting goods and people up from the quayside, away from the hallowed lawn outside the house. Dickens himself was witness, most likely in 1849, to these "Broadstairs donkey wars", which directly inspired the events recounted in Chapter 13 of David Copperfield.

Although Dickens placed the Trotwood household in Dover, his description of the house in which Betsey Trotwood lived is an exact representation of Dickens House, both in terms of the building and its setting. The Dover placing, however, was better suited to the story and no doubt protected both Mary Pearson Strong and to a lesser degree Dickens himself from intrusion while in Broadstairs.

This geographic sleight of hand led to the connection with Mary Pearson Strong becoming somewhat forgotten in the later years of the 19th century, albeit not in Broadstairs. The new owner of 2 Nuckell's Place, local chemist Julian Horrell, wrote to All the Year Round in early 1894 asking for confirmation of the Strong-Trotwood link. The reply on behalf of Charles Jr., he having assumed ownership on his father's death, was that "the lady whose objection to donkeys is referred to in David Copperfield Lived in a little house in Broadstairs", but he did not recall the house number. Two years later Charles Dickens Junior would write specifically about the donkey wars and Mary Pearson Strong in a Pall Mall article, and Horrell would rename 2 Nuckell's Place "Dickens House".

== Museum ==
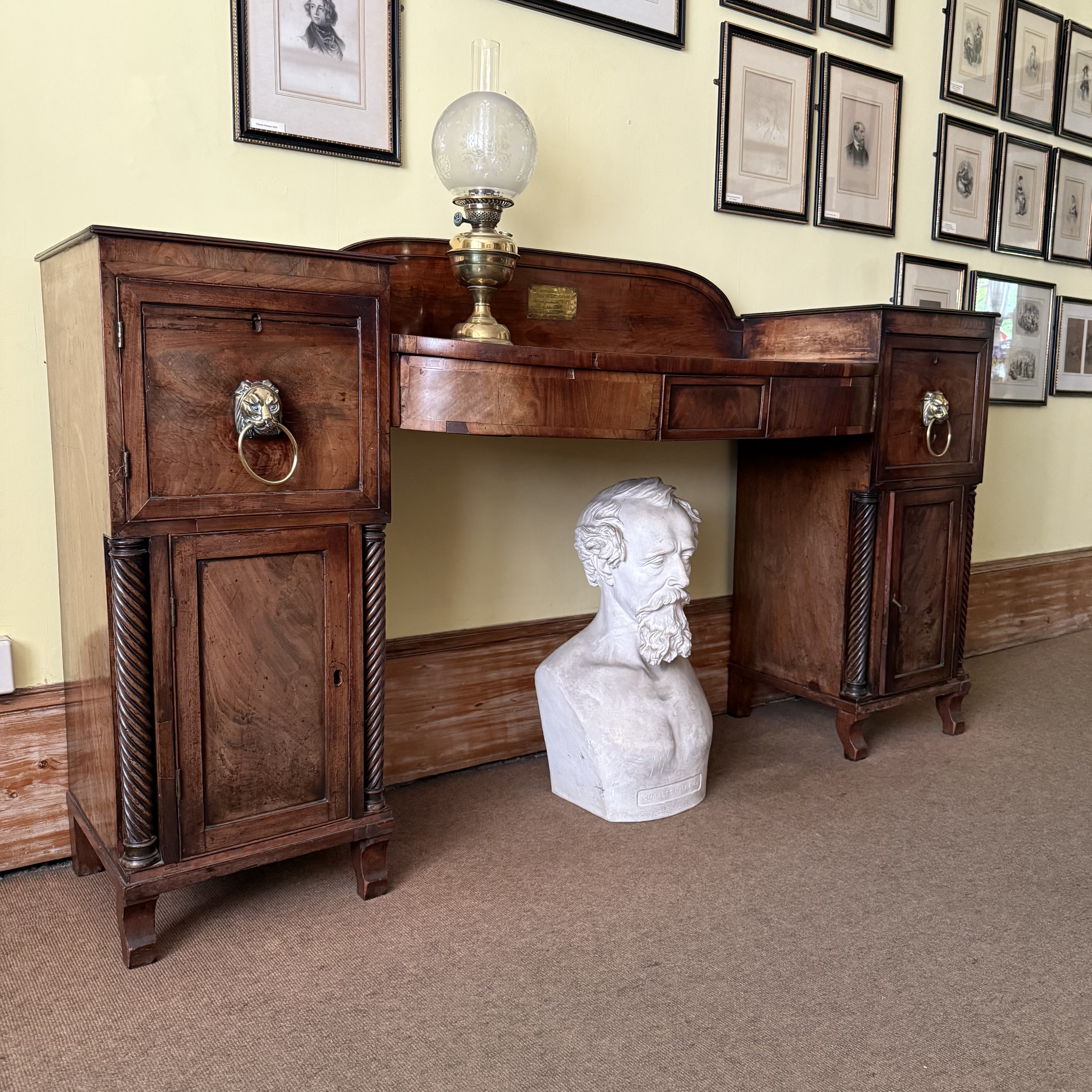
The Georgian sideboard purchased by Charles Dickens to furnish his home at the time of his marriage to Catherine Hogarth in 1836. Eventually acquired by the Tattam family, it was gifted, along with Dickens House, to Broadstairs Urban District Council (subsequently Thanet District Council) in 1951.

The museum occupies the ground floor and first floor of Dickens House and contains a number of thematic displays and recreated period rooms. The displays themselves use a variety of artefacts as part of their storytelling; these include letters written by Charles Dickens, furniture owned by him, early editions of his works and illustrations (lithographs) from his works. Notable artefacts include

- Georgian sideboard, bought by Dickens' for his Doughty Street home
- Writing slope, used by Dickens on his second American tour
- First edition serials of Dickens's work
- Bound first editions of Dickens's work
- Illustrations by Hablot Knight "Phiz" Brown, Daniel Maclise and Frederick Barnard among others

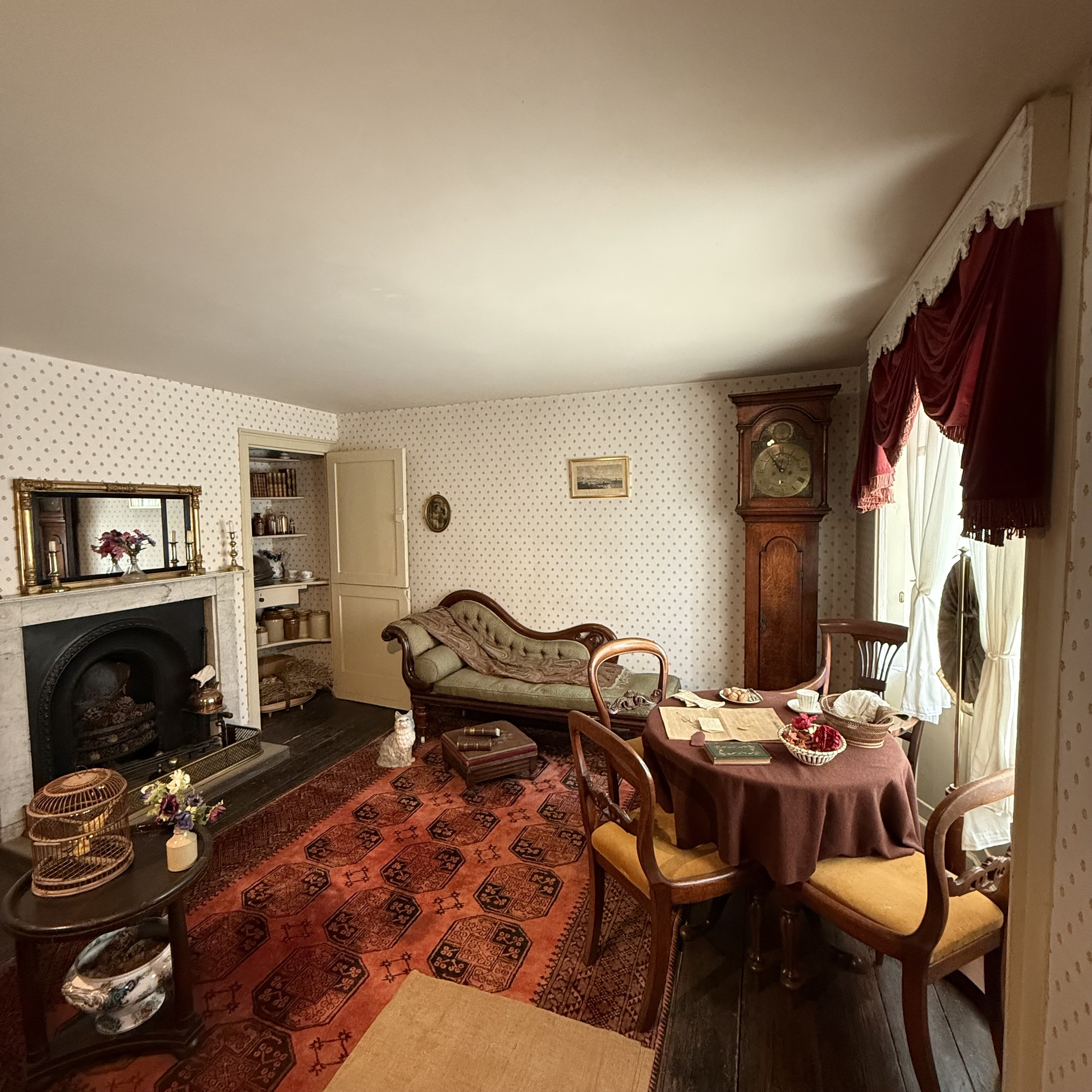
The recreated parlour as described by Charles Dickens in David Copperfield

One of the key rooms is the parlour. This room has been returned, using period furniture and decoration, to its appearance as Charles Dickens would have known it as a visitor and also as he described it as Betsey Trotwood's parlour in David Copperfield. In David's words:

The room was as neat as Janet or my aunt. As I laid down my pen, a moment since, to think of it, the air from the sea came blowing in again, mixed with the perfume of the flowers; and I saw the old-fashioned furniture brightly rubbed and polished, my aunt's inviolable chair and table by the round green fan in the bow-window, the drugget-covered carpet, the cat, the kettle-holder, the two canaries, the old china, the punchbowl full of dried rose-leaves, the tall press guarding all sorts of bottles and pots, and, wonderfully out of keeping with the rest, my dusty self upon the sofa, taking note of everything.

In front of Dickens House is Nuckell's Garden, which is the site of the Broadstairs donkey wars which so inspired Charles Dickens.

The museum is open from April till October every year and is operated by Thanet District Council. Opening hours and admission charges are published on the Visit Thanet tourism website.

== See also ==
- Dickens family
- Dickens World
- Tavistock House
- Charles Dickens Museum
- Bleak House, Broadstairs
- Gads Hill Place
- Ware, Hertfordshire, the first British town to hold a yearly Dickensian evening
