= Charles Dickens Museum =

Author's house museum in London, England

Coordinates: 51.523921°N 0.116902°W

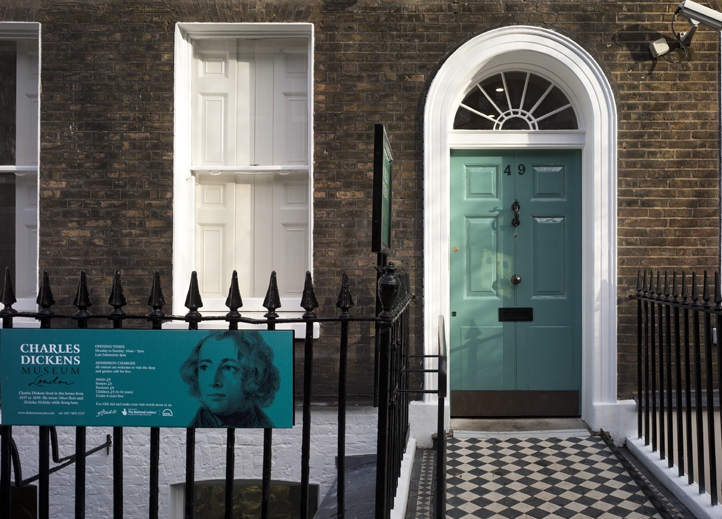
- Charles Dickens Museum, London
- Alternative names: Charles Dickens House

General information
- Type: House
- Location: Doughty Street, London, England

Design and construction
- Designations: Grade I listed building
- Known for: Being the home of the author Charles Dickens in the 1830s

The Charles Dickens Museum is an author's house museum at 48 Doughty Street in Bloomsbury, in the London Borough of Camden. It occupies a typical Georgian terraced house which was Charles Dickens's home from 25 March 1837 (a year after his marriage) to December 1839.

== Dickens and Doughty Street ==
In the nineteenth century, it was an exclusive residential street with gates at either end to restrict entry. These were staffed by porters. Charles Dickens and his wife Catherine Dickens (née Hogarth) lived here with the eldest three of their ten children, with the older two of Dickens's daughters, Mary Dickens and Kate Macready Dickens being born in the house.

A new addition to the household was Dickens's younger brother Frederick. Also, Catherine's 17-year-old sister Mary moved with them from Furnival's Inn to offer support to her married sister and brother. It was not unusual for a woman's unwed sister to live with and help a newly married couple. Dickens became very attached to Mary, and she died in his arms after a brief illness in 1837. She inspired characters in many of his books, and her death is fictionalized as the death of Little Nell. Dickens had a three-year lease (at £80 a year) on the property. He would remain here until 1839 when he moved to Devonshire Terrace. He upscaled to grander homes as his wealth increased and his family grew. However, Doughty Street is his only surviving London house.

The two years that Dickens lived in the house were extremely productive, for here he completed The Pickwick Papers (1836), wrote the whole of Oliver Twist (1838) and Nicholas Nickleby (1838–39) and worked on Barnaby Rudge (1840–41).

== The museum ==
The building at 48 Doughty Street was threatened with demolition in 1923, but was saved by the Dickens Fellowship, founded in 1902, who raised the mortgage and bought the property's freehold. The house was renovated and the Dickens House Museum was opened in 1925, under the direction of an independent trust, now a registered charity. The house was listed in 1954.

Perhaps the best-known exhibit is the portrait of Dickens known as Dickens's Dream by R. W. Buss, an original illustrator of The Pickwick Papers. This unfinished portrait shows Dickens in his study at Gads Hill Place surrounded by many of the characters he had created. The painting was begun in 1870 after Dickens's death. Other notable artefacts in the museum include numerous first editions, original manuscripts, original letters by Dickens, and many personal items owned by Dickens and his family. The only known item of clothing worn by Dickens still in existence is also displayed at the museum. This is his Court Suit and sword, worn when Dickens was presented to the Prince of Wales in 1870.

== Gallery ==
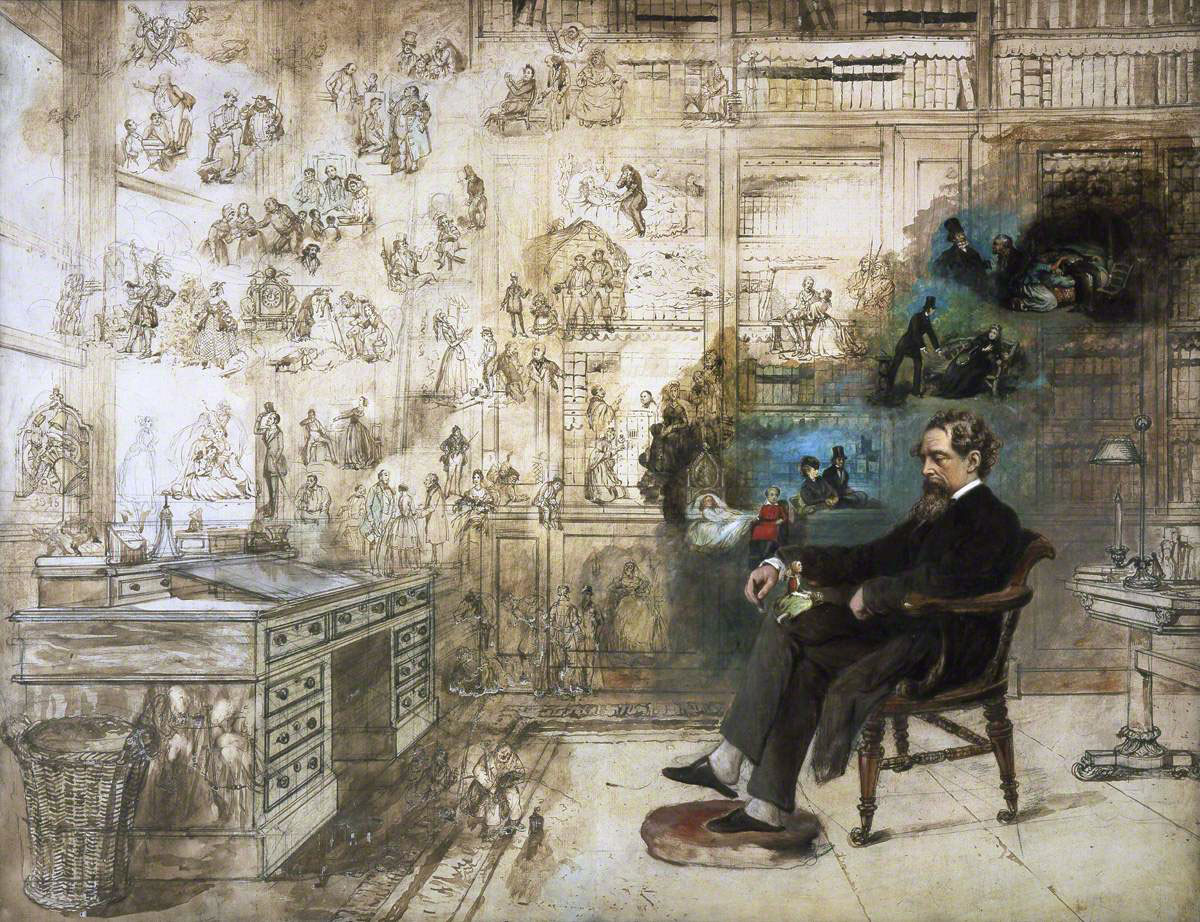
Dickens's Dream, by Robert William Buss

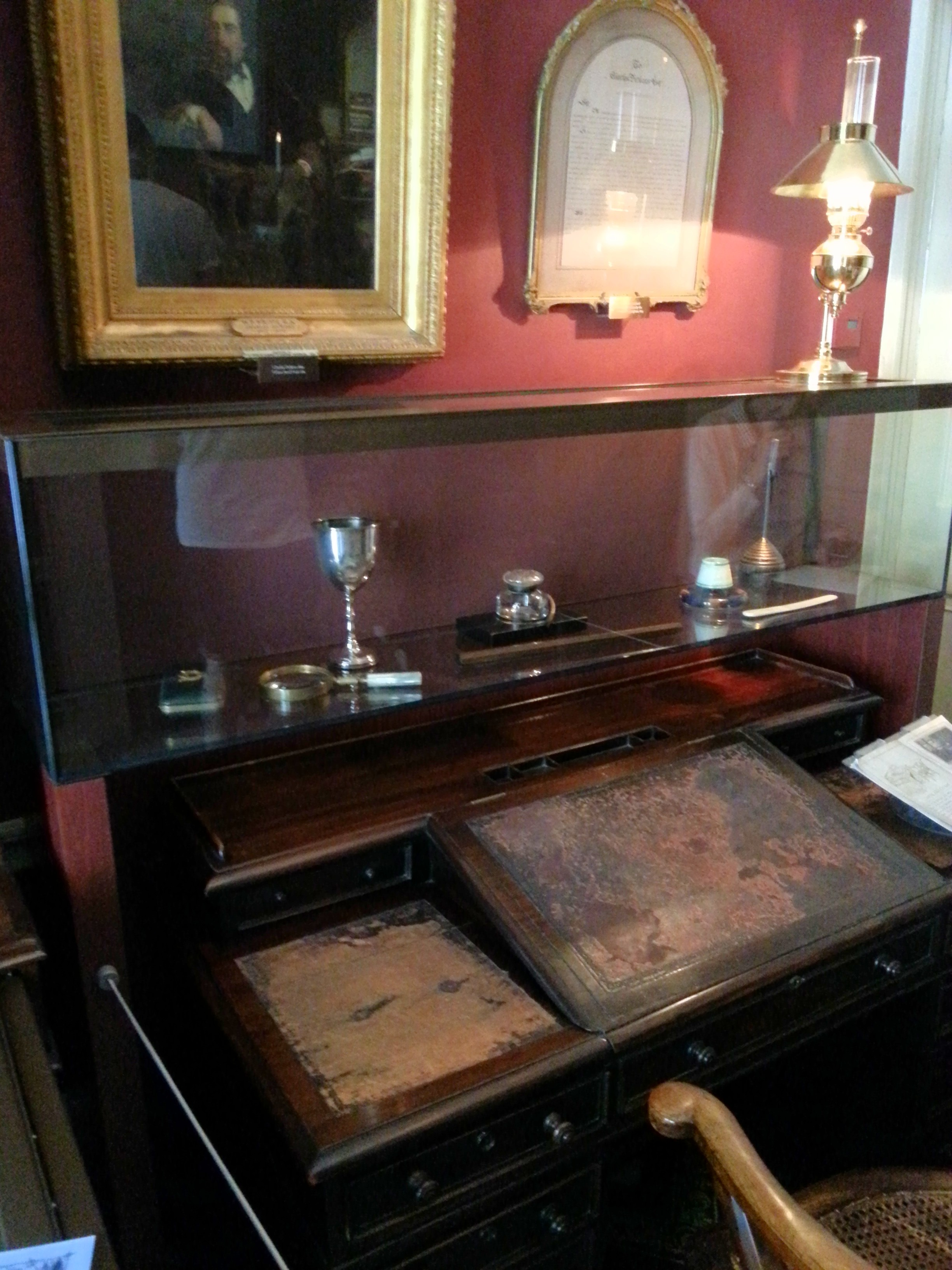
Study

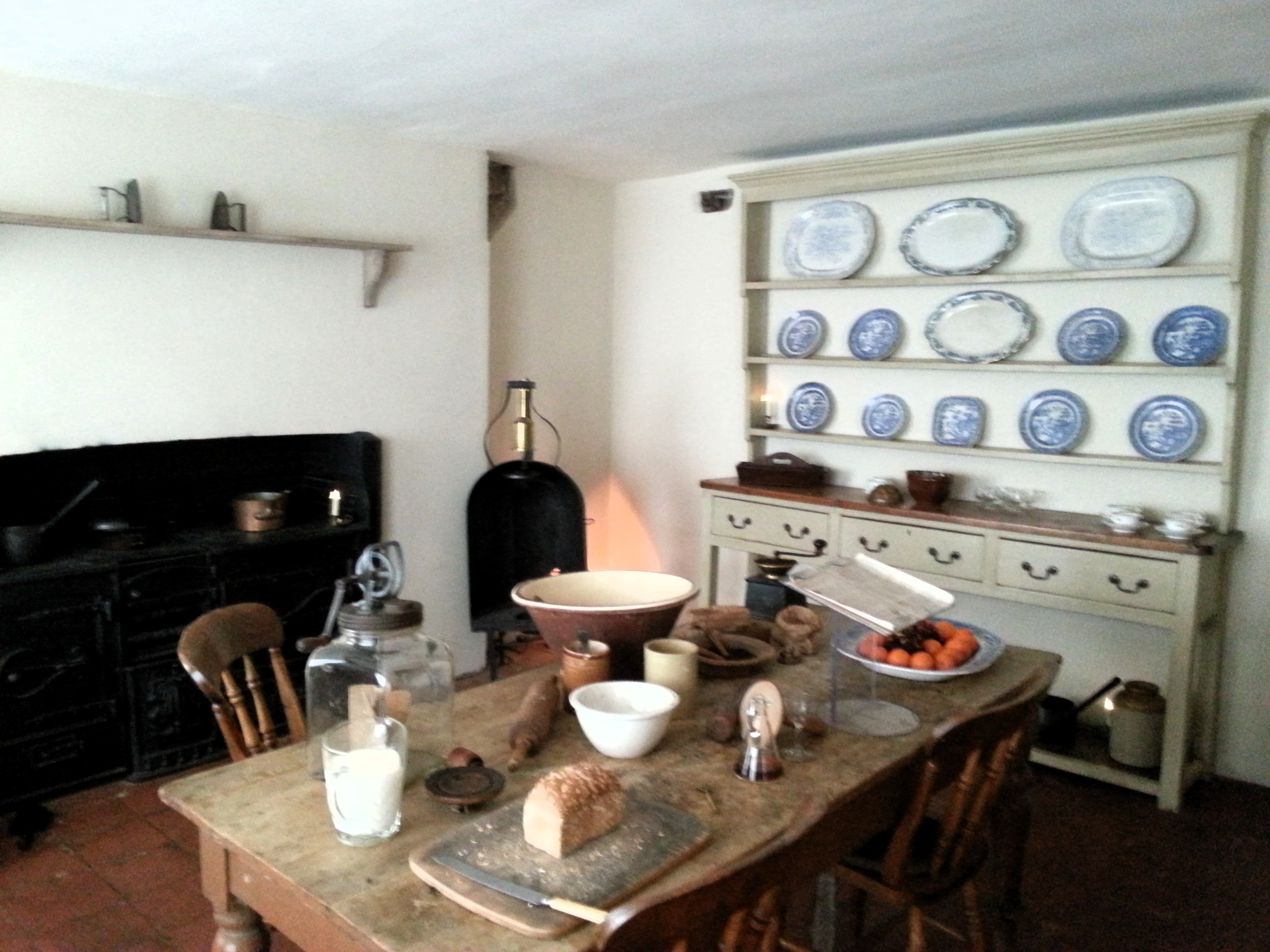
Basement kitchen

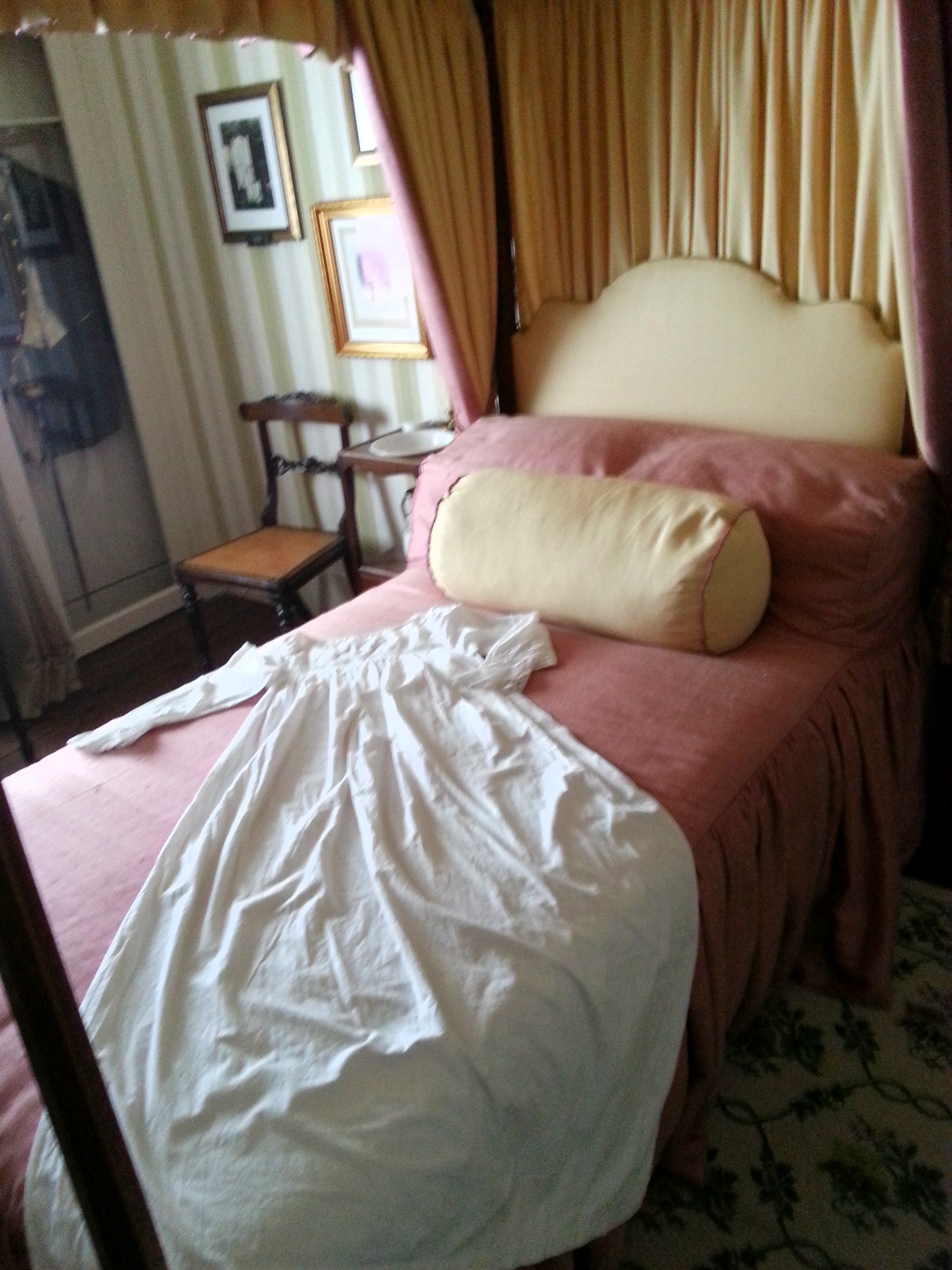
Mary Hogarth room

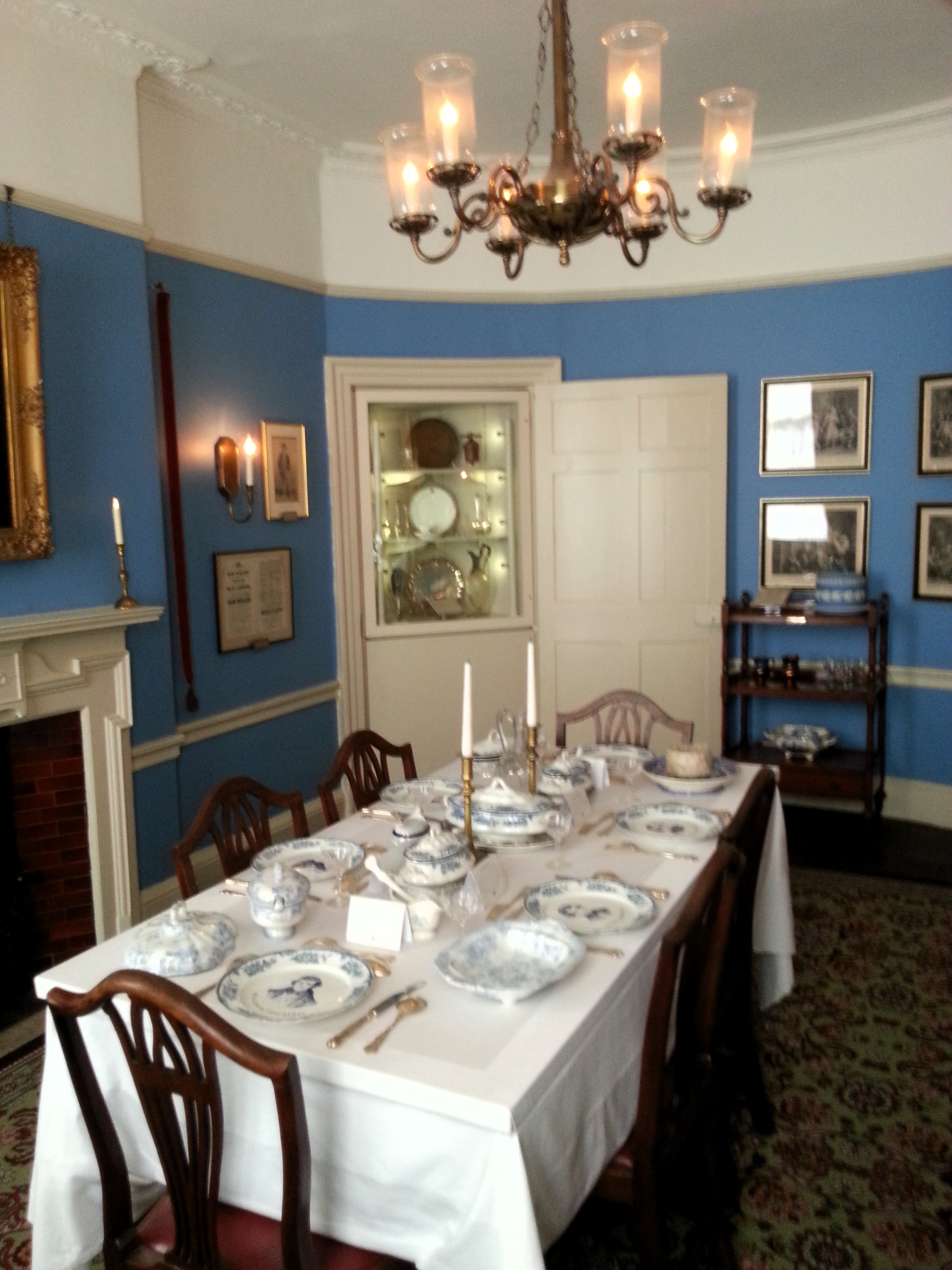
Dining room

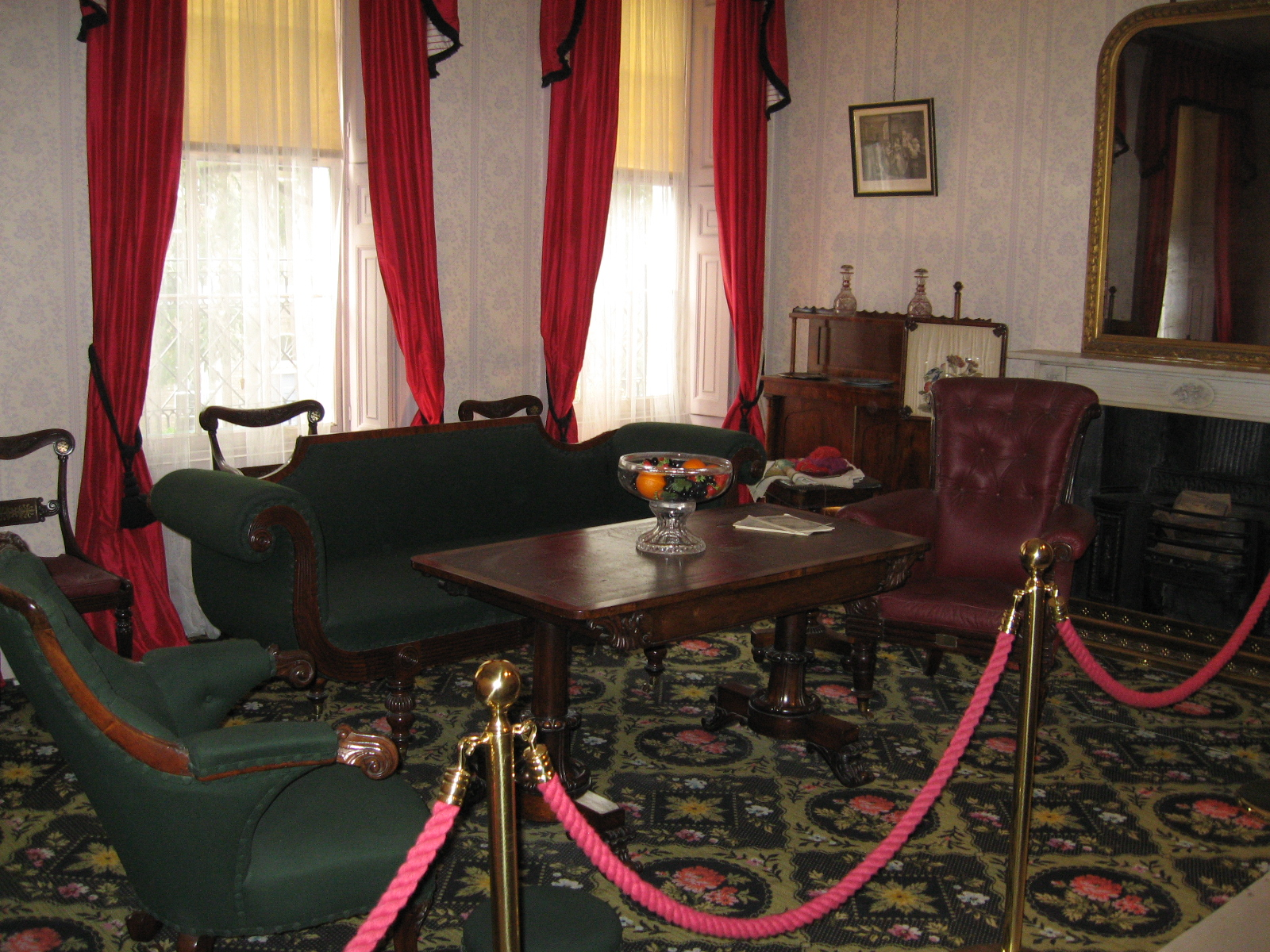
Dickens's living room

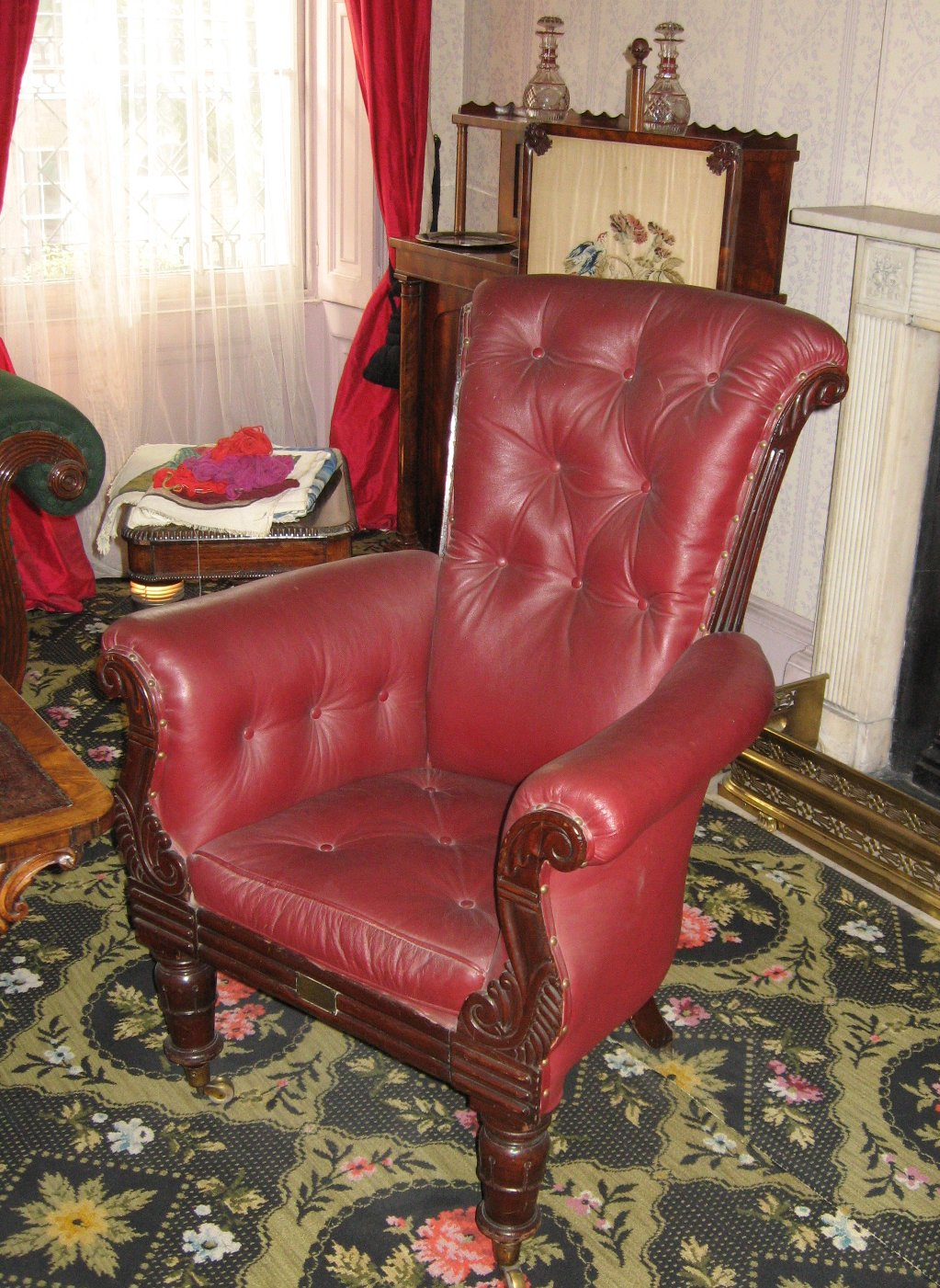
Dickens's chair

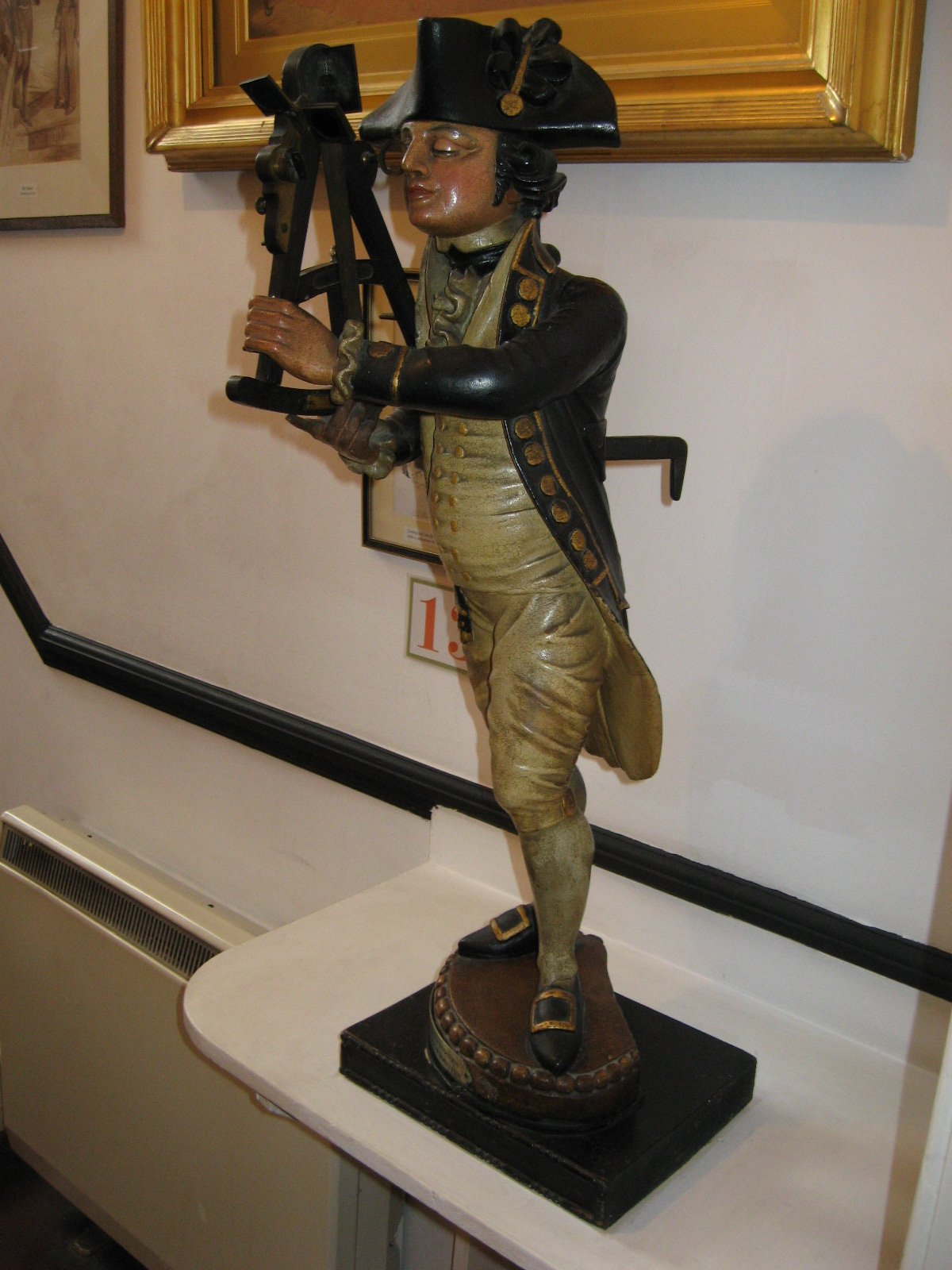
The "Little Midshipman", referred to in Dombey and Son

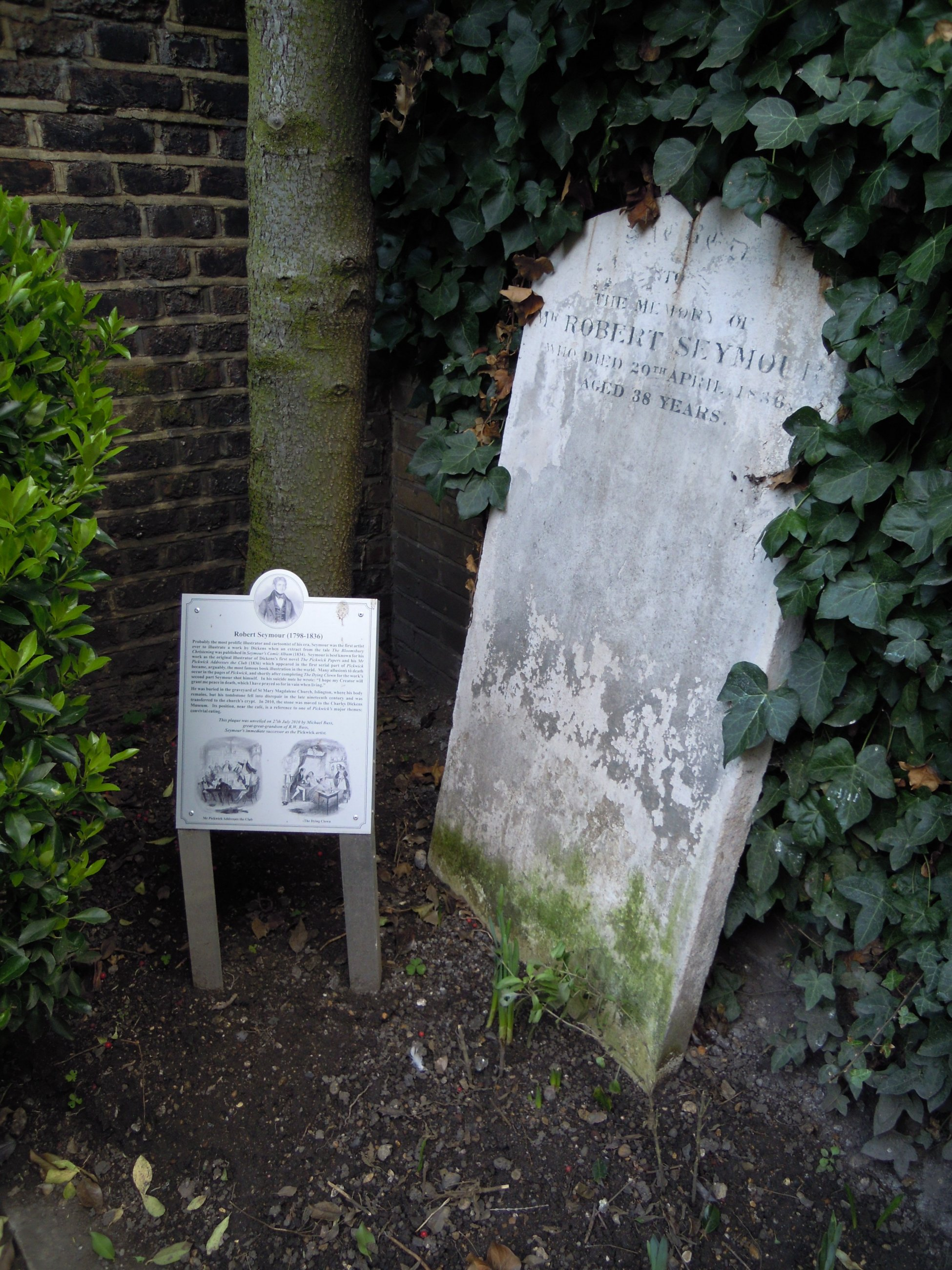
Headstone of illustrator Robert Seymour

== See also ==
- Dickens family
- Dickens World
- Tavistock House
- Dickens House Museum, Broadstairs
- Bleak House, Broadstairs
- Gads Hill Place
- Ware, Hertfordshire, the first British town to hold a yearly Dickensian evening
