= Dickens World =

2007–2016 amusement park in England

Coordinates: 51.40110°N 0.53189°E

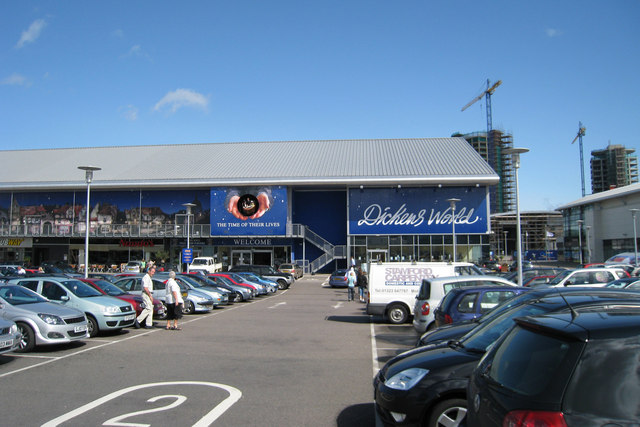
Dickens World, Chatham, Kent.

Dickens World was a themed attraction located in the Chatham Dockside retail park in Kent, England. It was themed around elements of the life and work of Charles Dickens. After a soft opening in April, Dickens World officially opened to the public on 25 May 2007. It closed on 12 October 2016.

== Concept ==
First conceived as far back as the 1970s, Dickens World was designed by Gerry O'Sullivan-Beare, who also created Santaworld in Sweden and Andersen World. It cost £62 million. Designers RMA Ltd worked closely with Dickens World and the Dickens Fellowship to ensure that the production of authentic storylines, characters, atmospheric streets, courtyards, and alleyways were true to the period.

Dickens World was based around the life of author Charles Dickens, briefly a resident of Chatham in Kent as a child and who, as an adult, lived at Gad's Hill Place in nearby Higham. Many of the locations and characters in his novels are based on buildings, places and people of the Medway Towns. Holcombe Manor in Chatham was the inspiration for Dingley Dell, the house in Pickwick Papers, and some of Edwin Drood takes place in Rochester Cathedral.

Dickens World was an indoor attraction, centred on a courtyard with façades of buildings related to Dickens, like Warren's Blacking. Unlike many other theme parks, Dickens World was not designed to guide visitors through any particular path, but enabled them to structure their own experience.

== Original attractions ==
When Dickens World first opened it included a Great Expectations-themed water ride, a Haunted House, a 4D movie at Peggotty's boathouse, an animatronic show in a mock-up Britannia Theatre, an interactive schoolhouse based on Dotheboys Schoolhouse, a "Fagin's den" play area for children, and "The Six Jolly Fellowship Porters", a themed bar and restaurant. Visitors exited into a gift shop called The Olde Curiosity Shoppe.

The Great Expectations ride took visitors through scenes of Victorian London and ended with a simulated drop from a sewer into the River Thames. Though featuring Magwitch, the ride did not follow the plot of Great Expectations. Instead, it emphasised the criminal elements of Dickens' novel, featuring a jail filled with criminal characters from several of the writer's books. That ride closed in 2013.

The 4D film in Peggotty's Boathouse told the story of Dickens, featuring an inflatable Catherine Dickens, a winking Nelly Ternan, and a spray of water in the face during the Dickenses' trip to America. The whole is framed with a magic lantern theme. The attraction remained open with many of the features periodically breaking.

At Dotheboys Schoolhouse visitors experience a Victorian classroom. Touch-screens replaced slates, and visitors took a quiz on Dickens' life and works.

The haunted house was first advertised as Ebenezer Scrooge's house, but before the grand opening was renamed the Haunted House of 1859, possibly alluding to Dickens' Christmas story, "The Haunted House," published that year. The house featured a Pepper's ghost effect.

== Administration and restructuring ==
The original company Dickens World Ltd placed itself in administration when unable to meet a £6 million tax bill, and investors lost £32 million. Former director, Ed De Lucy, explained that the attraction was losing between £500,000 and £1m each year, and only the revenue from the adjacent Odeon Theatre and Porter's restaurant had kept the attraction open.

The new owners reduced the prices to £6.50 a head and the boat trip ride was removed. From 23 March 2013, the venue offered a guide-led walking tour where the visitors met costumed characters. The location also planned to host weddings and corporate events.

Dickens World closed permanently in October 2016, when the restructuring and refinancing company pulled out of negotiations. The staff were informed by text messages and email that the company had ceased to operate.

== Use by the media ==
The Hoosiers used Dickens World as the location for their fourth single's video "Cops and Robbers" in March 2008.

It was also featured in series 2 of the CBBC series All Over the Place in 2012.

== See also ==
- Charles Dickens Museum, London
- Dickens fair
- Ware, Hertfordshire, the first British town to hold a yearly Dickensian evening
