= Robert William Buss =

British artist (1804–1875)

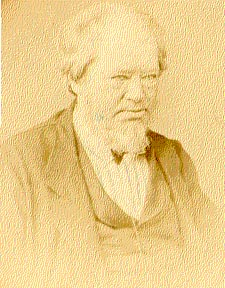
- Buss, c. 1874
- Born: 4 August 1804; Aldersgate, City of London, United Kingdom of Great Britain and Ireland
- Died: 26 February 1875 (aged 70); London, United Kingdom of Great Britain and Ireland
- Occupations: Artist, etcher, illustrator
- Years active: 1826–1870
- Notable work: Dicken's Dream
- Spouse: Frances Fleetwood (m. 1826)
- Children: 6; including Frances Buss

Robert William Buss (4 August 1804 – 26 February 1875) was a Victorian artist, etcher and illustrator perhaps best known for his painting Dickens' Dream. He was the father of Frances Buss, a pioneer of girls' education.

== Early career ==
Born in Bull and Mouth Street, Aldersgate in London in 1804, Buss served an apprenticeship with his father, a master engraver and enameller, and then studied painting under George Clint, a miniaturist, watercolour and portrait painter, and mezzotint engraver.

At the start of his career Buss specialised in painting theatrical portraits, with many of the leading actors of the day sitting to him, including William Charles Macready, John Pritt Harley, and John Baldwin Buckstone. Later Buss painted historical and humorous subjects. He exhibited a total of 112 pictures between 1826 and 1859, 25 at the Royal Academy, 20 at the British Institution, 45 at the Suffolk Street gallery of the Society of British Artists, seven at the New Watercolour Society, and 15 in other places.

== The Pickwick Papers ==
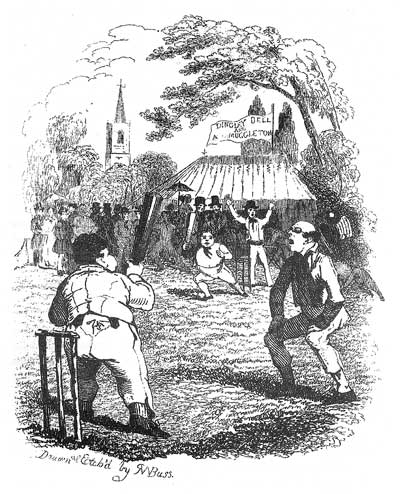
Illustration for The Pickwick Papers (1837)

Buss was commissioned by Dickens' publishers, Chapman and Hall, to provide two illustrations for The Pickwick Papers after the original illustrator, Robert Seymour, committed suicide. Buss set aside his other work immediately. He prepared a dozen or so preliminary sketches for the novel, then in its second of twenty instalments. Five of these sketches are in the Morgan Library & Museum in New York. His drawings were regarded as adequate, but the process of etching on a steel plate was unfamiliar to him so he hired an expert etcher.

Buss realised that the "free touch of an original work was entirely wanting", and that the printed images lifted from his plates seemed lifeless and uninspired. He concluded, however, "Time was up"; the unsatisfactory illustrations for Part Three had to be issued. The publishers dismissed him summarily: this disturbed Buss for the rest of his life. The commission went instead to Hablot Knight Browne, but Buss never held his dismissal against Dickens. Instead, Buss remained his lifelong admirer and went on to produce several paintings celebrating the author's work, including the unfinished Dickens' Dream.

== Later life ==
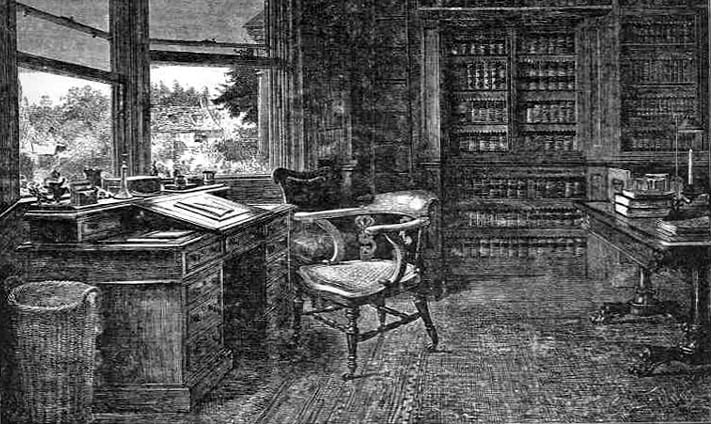
Samuel Luke Fildes – The Empty Chair. Fildes was illustrating "Edwin Drood" at the time of Charles Dickens' death. The wood-engraving shows Dickens' empty chair in his study at Gads Hill Place. It appeared in the Christmas 1870 edition of The Graphic and thousands of examples of it were sold. Vincent van Gogh was an admirer of the print.

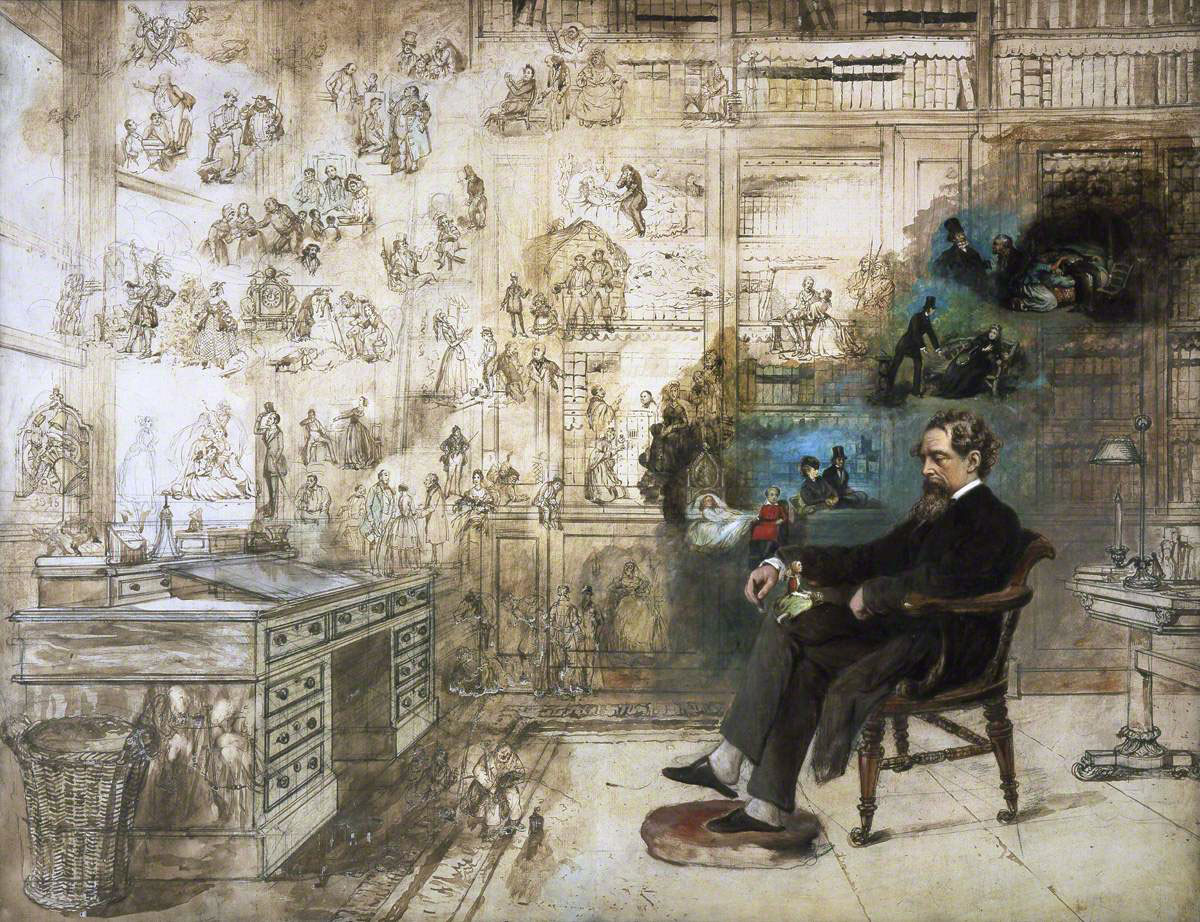
Dickens's Dream, 1870–75

In 1837, publishers Saunders and Otley hired Buss to illustrate a new edition of Frederick Marryat's Peter Simple. In 1840, Henry Colburn hired him to illustrate Frances Trollope's The Widow Married. These the artist managed to etch satisfactorily, and afterwards he successfully gained several commissions for illustrating fiction. For some years Buss worked for Charles Knight, designing wood-engravings for his editions of London (1841–44), William Shakespeare (1842–43), and Old England (1845–46).

Buss married Frances Fleetwood on 21 March 1826, and the couple settled in Camden Town, London, where they had ten children, six of whom survived infancy. Their only daughter, Frances Mary Buss, became a distinguished pioneer of women's education, and was assisted for many years by her father and her clergyman brothers Alfred and Septimus Buss.

In 1845, worried by money, Buss's wife began a school for young boys and girls at 14 Clarence Road, Kentish Town, London. In the same premises, his daughter Frances began a morning school offering young ladies a liberal education. In 1850, the two schools moved into larger quarters in Holmes Terrace, and Buss assisted by teaching drawing and later science, literature, and elocution. In 1850, Buss's wife retired from the school.

Buss researched earlier British printmakers, lecturing on the topic in his daughter's schools. From 1853, he delivered a series of four talks, accompanied by 300 examples reproduced on sixty scrolling cartoons, at literary and scientific institutions in London and the provinces. These talks he published privately in 1874 as English Graphic Satire, a book for which he supplied in various mediums examples of his predecessors' work. Buss also gave lectures on fresco painting and on the picturesque and the beautiful, though these were never published, and from 1850 to 1852 he edited The Fine Art Almanack.

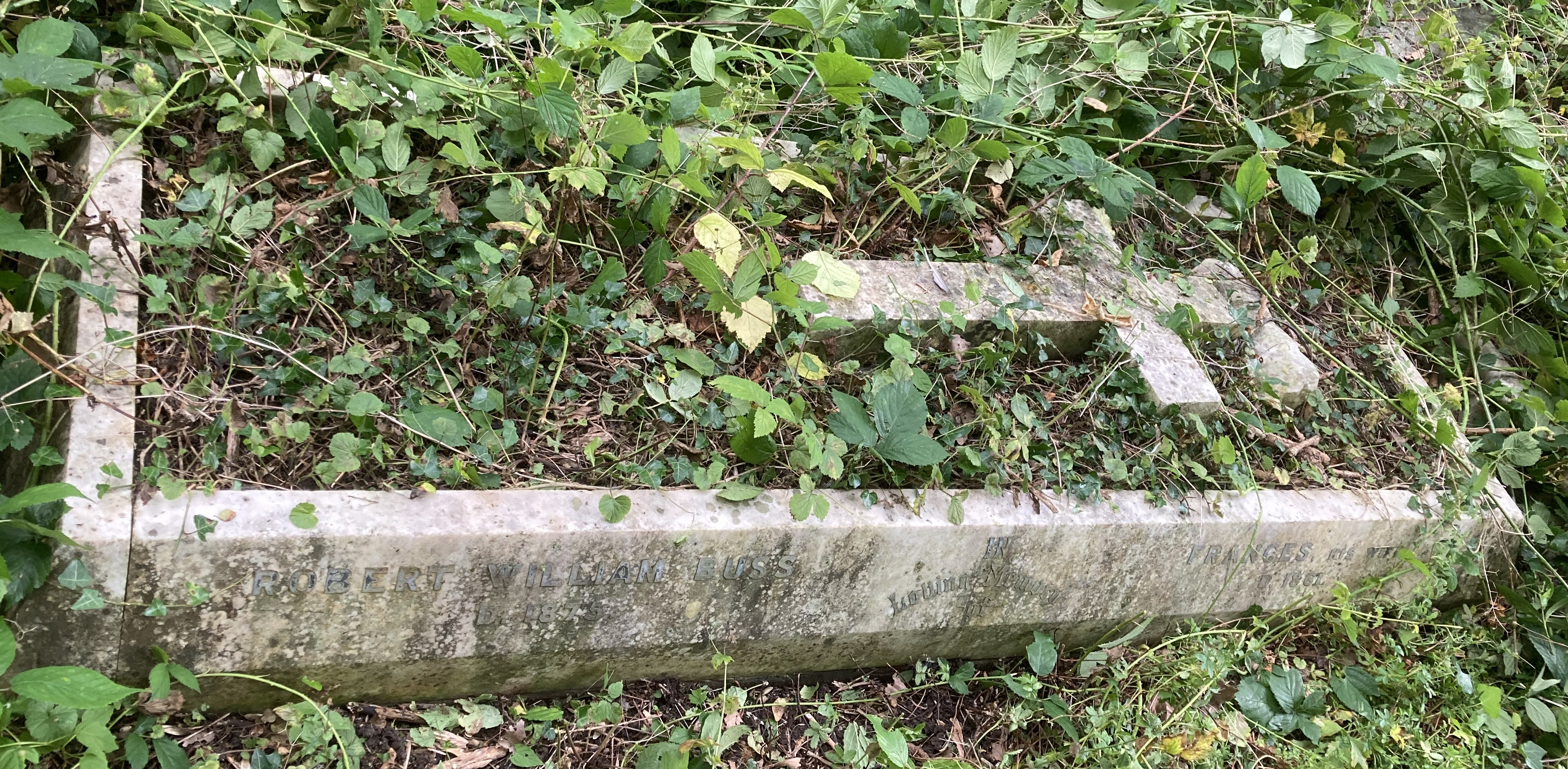
Grave of Robert William Buss in Highgate Cemetery

On hearing of Dickens' death in June 1870, Buss was moved to attempt a large watercolour, Dickens's Dream, which now hangs in the Charles Dickens Museum in London. The painting portrays the dozing author seated in his Gad's Hill Place study surrounded by many of the characters he had created. The desk, chair and background of the painting were closely based on The Empty Chair, an engraving made at Gads Hill Place in 1870, shortly after Dickens's death, by Samuel Luke Fildes. The painting was Buss's last attempt to illustrate Dickens's characters, and he modestly reproduced the images of the artists who had succeeded him. However, before he could finish it, Buss died at his home at 14 Camden Street, London on 26 February 1875. He is buried with his wife on the western side of Highgate Cemetery (plot no. 10939).
