= George and Vulture =

Restaurant in London

Coordinates: 51.5130°N 0.0858°W

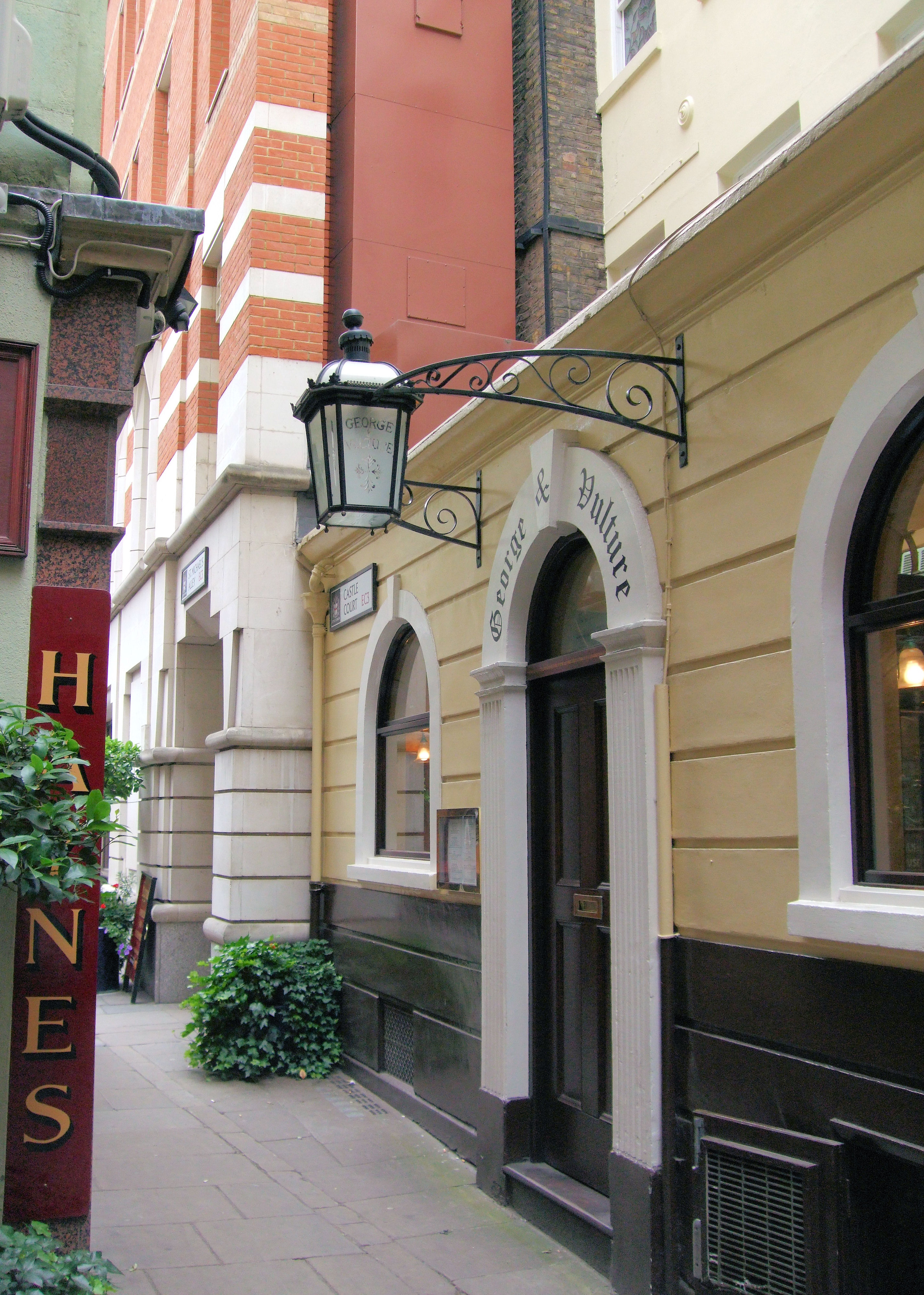
- Interactive map of George and Vulture

Restaurant information
- Established: 1142
- Owner: Samuel Smith Old Brewery
- Food type: Steakhouse
- Location: Off Lombard Street, London, London, City of London, United Kingdom

The George and Vulture is a restaurant in London. There has been an inn on the site, which is off Lombard Street in the historic City of London district, since 1142. It was said to be a meeting place of the notorious Hellfire Club and has long been a revered City steakhouse.

It is mentioned at least 20 times in the 1837 novel The Pickwick Papers by Charles Dickens, who frequently drank there himself. The George and Vulture has been the headquarters of the City Pickwick Club since its foundation. When it was threatened with demolition, Cedric Charles Dickens, the author's great-grandson, campaigned to save it. Since 1950 it has been the home of his Dickens Pickwick Club, and, in the same year, it became the venue for the Christmas Day Dickens family gathering, in the Dickens Room.

The George and Vulture was praised in Good Food Guide to London, 1968, as a "rare example of an old City chop-house." By that date, if not earlier, the establishment was celebrated for its Pickwick Pudding that sold in 1968 for twelve shillings sixpence but only on Thursday during oyster season. A recipe for said pudding was published in the 1968 Recipes from Restaurants in the Good Food Guide. Essentially, it was a steak and kidney pudding served with oysters poached in their own liquor and served separately.

The George and Vulture is a Grade II listed building, dating back to the early 18th century. It is now run by Samuel Smith Old Brewery (Tadcaster).
