= Mary Hogarth =

Sister-in-law of Charles Dickens (1819–1837)

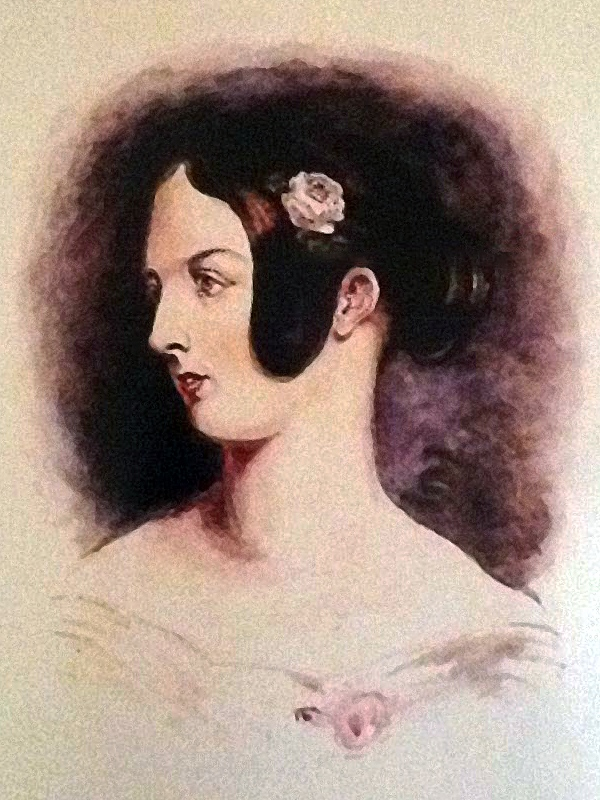
- Portrait of Hogarth aged 16
- Born: Mary Scott Hogarth; 26 October 1819; Edinburgh, Scotland
- Died: 7 May 1837 (aged 17); London, England
- Burial place: Kensal Green Cemetery, London, England
- Known for: Sister-in-law of Charles Dickens
- Relatives: Catherine Dickens (sister); Georgina Hogarth (sister); George Hogarth (father)

Mary Scott Hogarth (26 October 1819 (Note: Some sources incorrectly say she was born in 1820.) – 7 May 1837 (Note: Some sources incorrectly say she died on 7 March 1837.)) was the sister of Catherine Dickens (née Hogarth) and the sister-in-law of Charles Dickens. Hogarth first met Charles Dickens at age 14, and after Dickens married Hogarth's sister Catherine, Mary lived with the couple for a year. Hogarth died suddenly in 1837, which caused Dickens to miss the publication dates for two novels: The Pickwick Papers and Oliver Twist. Hogarth later became the inspiration for a number of characters in Dickens novels, including Rose Maylie in Oliver Twist and Little Nell in The Old Curiosity Shop. Charles and Catherine Dickens' first daughter was named Mary in her memory.

== Life ==
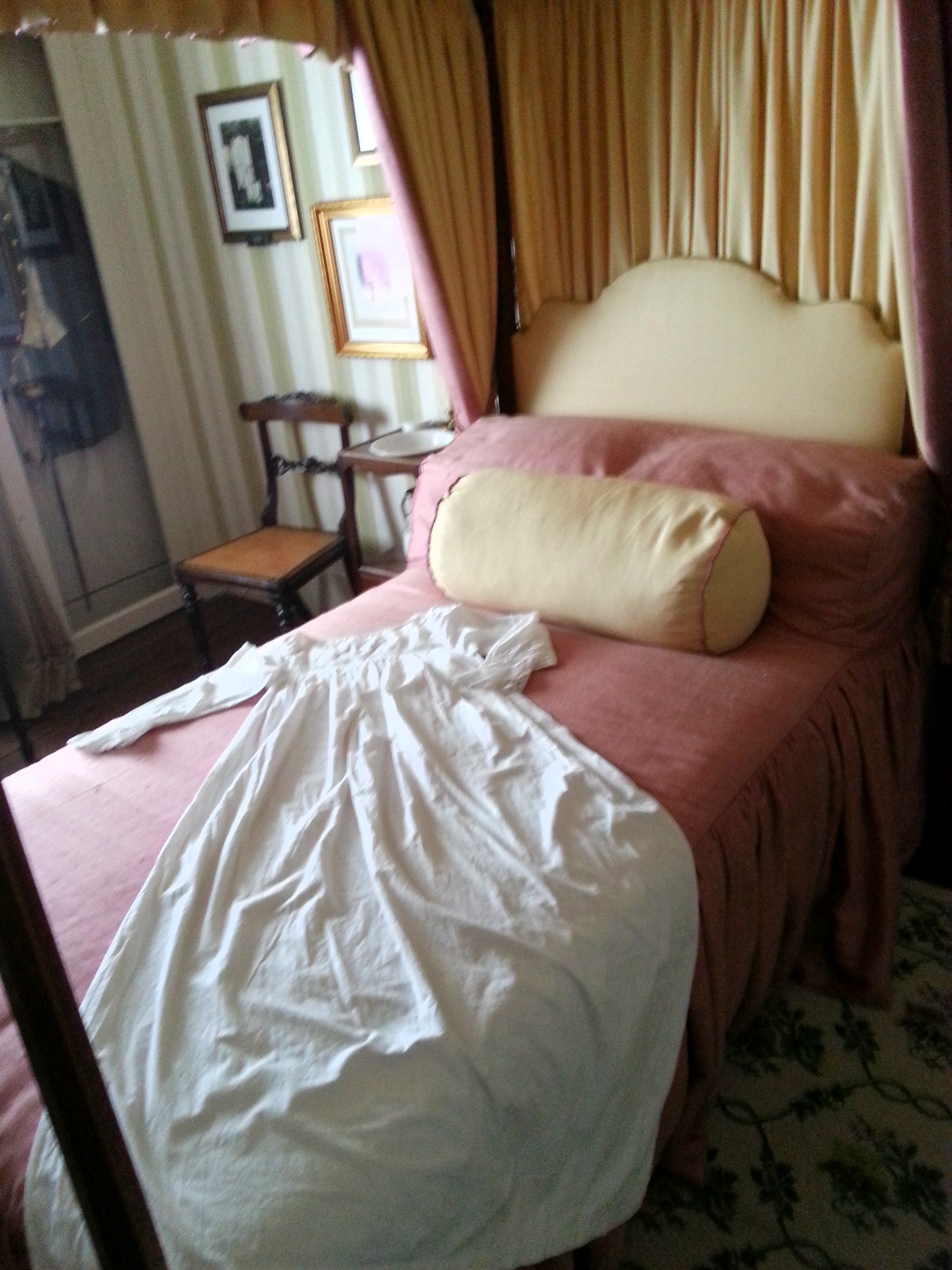
Hogarth's room at 48 Doughty Street in 2014.

Hogarth was the daughter of George Hogarth (1783–1870), a music critic, cellist and composer, and Georgina Hogarth née Thompson (1793–1863). She was born in Edinburgh, where her father was a legal advisor to Walter Scott, whom the young Charles Dickens greatly admired. She was the fourth of ten children, and the third daughter. (Note: Some sources say she was the third child and second daughter.) Hogarth was named after her paternal grandmother. The name Mary Scott had previously been given to George and Georgina's third child, born 1817 or 1818, who was an infant when she died.

Mary and her sister Catherine first met Charles Dickens when Mary was aged 14, on Dickens' first visit to the Hogarth household in Brompton, London. Whilst Dickens and Catherine were courting, Mary was a constant companion and chaperone to both of them. After Charles and Catherine Dickens married in 1836, Hogarth lived with them for a month in a three bedroom apartment at the Furnival's Inn in Holborn, London. From March 1837, Hogarth lived with the couple at 48 Doughty Street, where she helped her sister with household chores, as Catherine was pregnant with her first child.

Hogarth was described by those who knew her as "sweet, beautiful and light-hearted". When Robert Story visited the Hogarth household in 1836, he described Hogarth as "the fairest flower of spring". Dickens showed particular affection to Hogarth, and described her as "a close friend, an exceptional sister, a companion at home." It is believed that Hogarth was the first person to read The Pickwick Papers and Oliver Twist, as Dickens valued Hogarth's input and feedback more than his wife's.

== Death ==
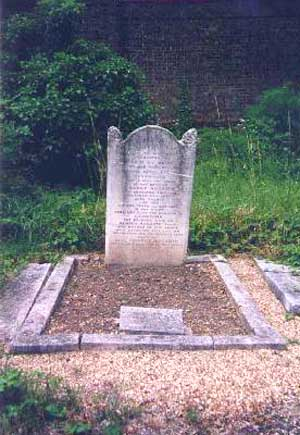
Hogarth's grave in Kensal Green Cemetery, London.

In the early hours of 7 May 1837, after Hogarth had returned from a showing of Is She His Wife? at the St James's Theatre with the Dickens couple, she collapsed unexpectedly. She died at around 15:00 local time later that day at the Dickens family home. Hogarth was 17 years old. The cause of death is believed to have been either heart failure or a stroke. In the weeks after Hogarth's death, Dickens wrote many letters, and three of them contained the assertion that the cause of death was heart failure. Hogarth was buried on 13 May at the Kensal Green Cemetery, London; Dickens bought the plot of land for Hogarth's grave. Dickens wrote the epitaph on her tombstone, which says "Young, beautiful, and good, God numbered her among his angels at the early age of seventeen". The tombstone now includes epitaphs to her brother George, and their parents Georgina, who died in 1863, and George, who died in 1870.

The bedroom where Hogarth died is now part of the Charles Dickens Museum. As a result of Hogarth's death, Charles Dickens missed the publication dates for The Pickwick Papers and Oliver Twist. It was the only time in his life that Dickens missed publication dates. As a reason for missing the publication dates, he wrote that "he had lost a very dear young relative to whom he was most affectionately attached, and whose society has been, for a long time, the chief solace of his labours". He wore Hogarth's ring for the rest of his life, and also requested a locket of her hair.

Eight months after Hogarth's death, Charles and Catherine Dickens' second child and first daughter was born. Charles insisted that the child be named Mary, in memory of Hogarth.

== Inspiration for Dickens characters ==
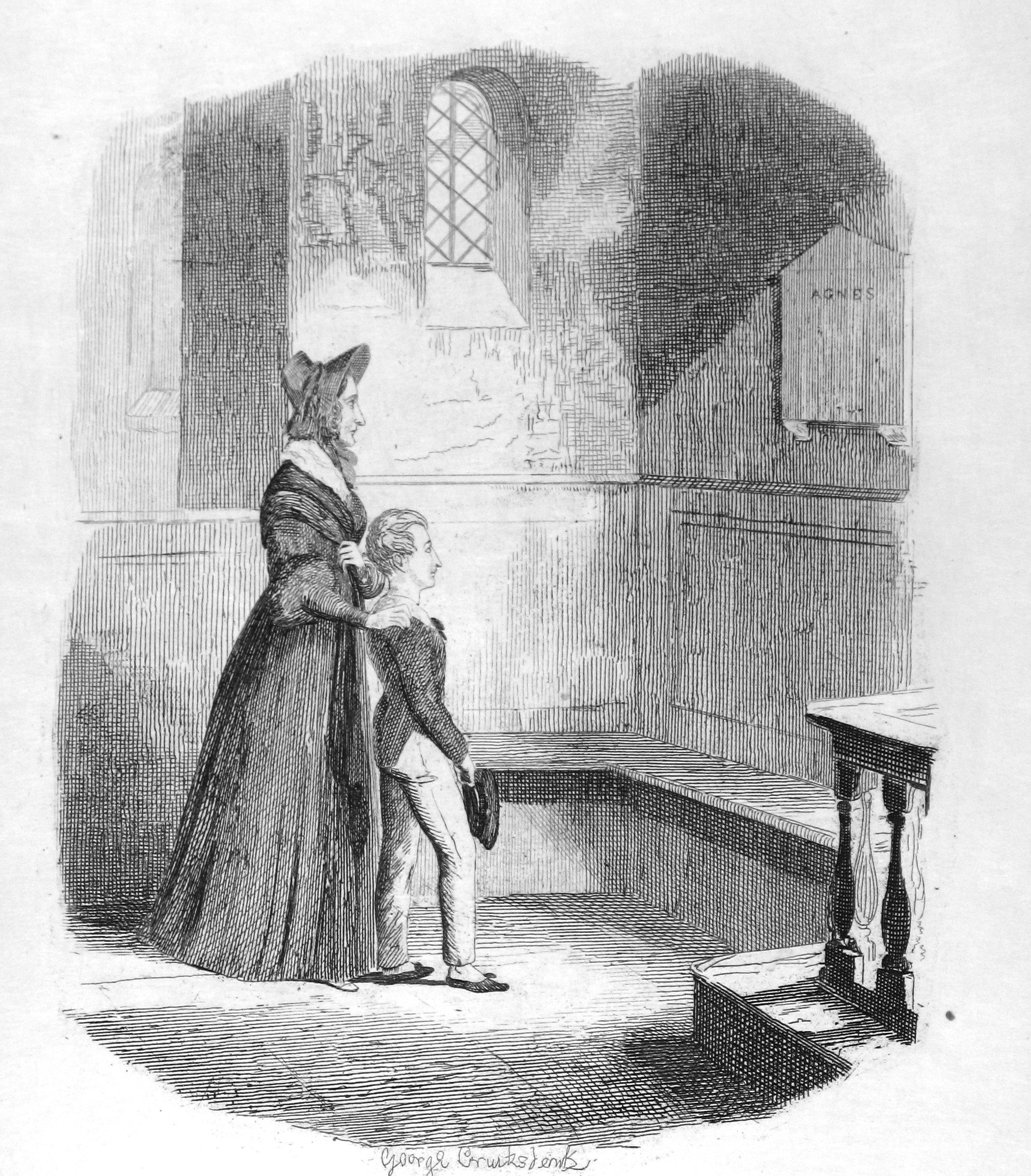
Engraving of Rose Maylie and Oliver Twist. Hogarth is seen as the inspiration for Maylie.

Hogarth is believed to have influenced a number of Dickens characters. She is seen as the inspiration for Rose Maylie in Oliver Twist, which was publishing serially when Mary died. In the book, Maylie suffered a sudden illness, although unlike Hogarth, Maylie did not die. Robert Douglas-Fairhurst, an author who studied Dickens, believed that Dickens wanted to "give the story a different ending." Hogarth is also seen as the inspiration for Little Nell in The Old Curiosity Shop. Nell had many traits that Dickens associated with Hogarth, including describing Nell as "young, beautiful and good", and Nell also dies suddenly in the book. Other characters believed to have been inspired by Mary include Kate Nickleby, the 17-year-old sister of the hero of the novel Nicholas Nickleby; Agnes Wickfield, the heroine in David Copperfield (her character was a mixture of both Mary and Georgina, another of Dickens' sister-in-laws); Ruth Pinch from Martin Chuzzlewit; Lilian, the child who appears in Trotty Veck's visions in The Chimes; and Dot Peerybingle, the sister in The Cricket on the Hearth. Unlike Hogarth, Dickens' wife Catherine does not appear to have been the inspiration for any of his characters.
