= Gad's Hill School =

Location
- Higham, Kent, ME3 7PA; England; 51°24′40″N 0°27′28″E

Information
- Type: Independent school Co-educational; Day school
- Motto: First to thine own self be true
- Established: 1924
- Local authority: Kent
- Headmaster: Paul Savage
- Gender: Coeducational
- Age: 3 to 16
- Enrolment: 331
- Houses: Haig, Wellington, Beatty
- Website: www.gadshill.org

Gad's Hill School in Higham, Kent, England, is an independent school for day pupils, founded in 1924. It is set in the former Gads Hill Place, the country home of Charles Dickens.

== School history ==
Gad's Hill School is set in the former home of the author Charles Dickens, who lived at Gad's Hill Place from 1856 until his death in 1870.

In 1923, Mr John Burt was searching for a large family house with grounds and gardens suitable for conversion into a girls boarding school. In the same year, Colonel Latham – who owned the property after Dickens – died and the Burt family received the particulars of the sale.

Mr Burt reported that the property seemed to be well suited for use as a school, with the advantage of extensive grounds suitable for sport. Having stood vacant for six months, Gad's Hill Place School was opened on 6 May 1924, with the stated intention of providing a high class school for the daughters of gentlemen, education on modern methods and preparation for public examinations.

Miss Wilhelmina Burt, one of Mr Burt's four daughters, was the first headmistress, along with her sister and co-principal Edith.

The school opened with four day pupils, joined at half-term by two boarders, and by the time that Miss Burt made her prize-giving speech at the end of the first year of Gad’s Hill, there were six boarders and fifteen day pupils.

During the Second World War, in view of the proximity of Chatham and its Royal Navy Dockyard, it was thought necessary to seek a safer location for the school. At first, Miss Burt relocated lessons to Oxon Hoath, a fine estate to the north-east of Tonbridge. However, by June 1940, with the Germans in Paris and Chatham suffering its first air raid, it was decided to move the school again to a safer area.

At 6.30 am on 25 June 1940, a small group of teachers and 19 girls travelled to the Lake District, where they arrived finally at the Tower Hotel in Portinscale. The hotel initially only had room for the adults and so the children were billeted to houses in the village. The school was based there for several years, while the Kent property was requisitioned by the Admiralty as a hostel for the Women's Royal Naval Service. Ninety-one Wrens slept in the building, while Dickens's tunnel under the Gravesend Road was fitted out as a gas-proof air raid shelter and first aid post.

The school re-opened at Gad's Hill in December 1944, with 26 pupils enrolled, six of whom had been with them in the Lakes.

In 2001, Gad's Hill School admitted boys throughout the school for the first time. In 2013, a new main building was opened, with a music suite, sports hall, theatre and dining facilities.
