= Dickens fair =

Victorian-style festival

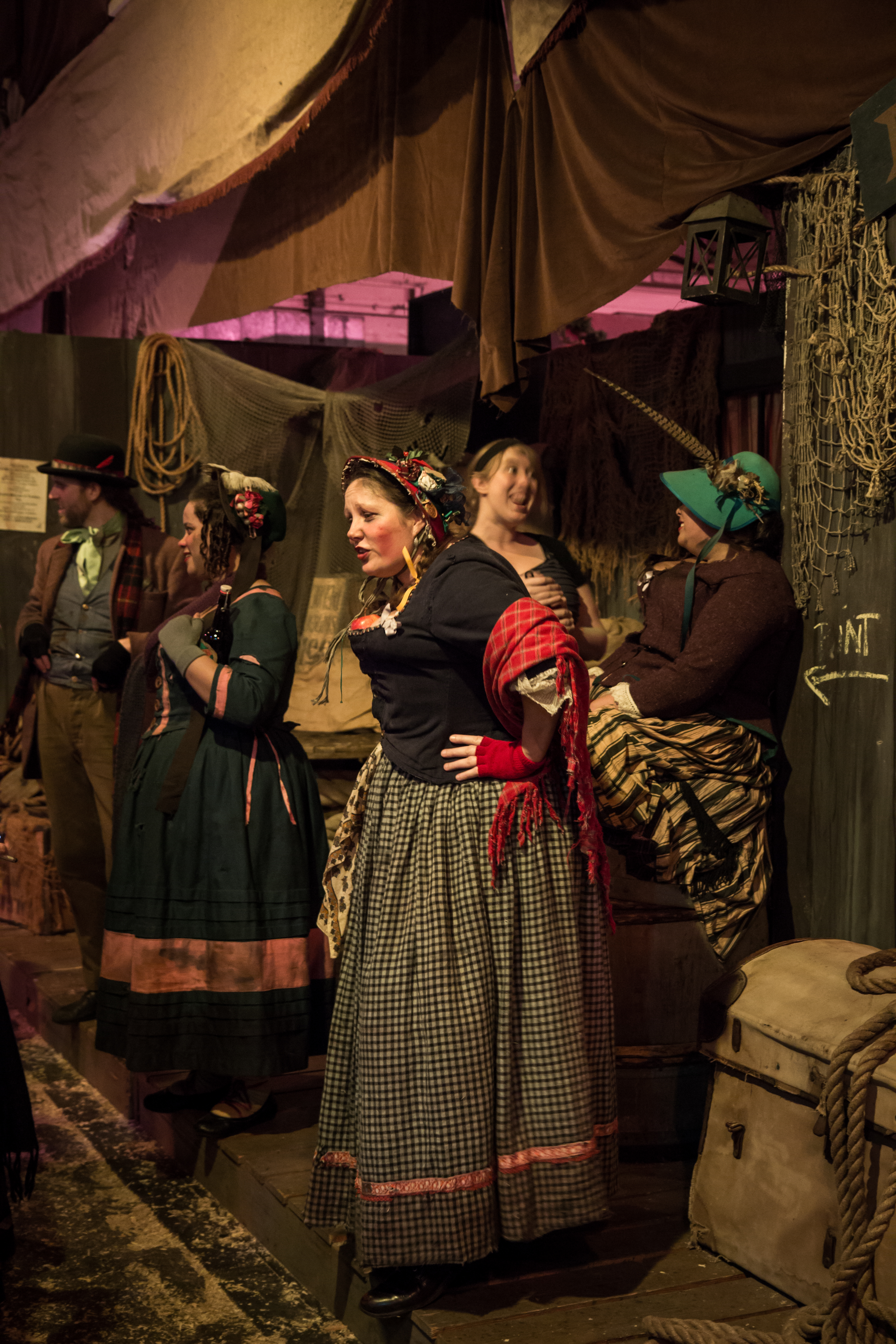
Performers at the 2014 Great Dickens Christmas Fair at the Cow Palace in Daly City, California

A Dickens fair (also Dickensian evening, Dickens Christmas fair, Dickens fête, or Dickens festival) is a weekend or multi-day gathering open to the public that attempts to recreate a Victorian English setting reminiscent of the novels of Charles Dickens. Events may be outdoor, indoor or a combination of the two. Many are Christmas-themed, a reflection of the enduring legacy of Dickens' 1843 novella A Christmas Carol. The fairs generally include costumed participants, musical and theatrical acts, art, handicrafts, food and drink for sale.

== Characteristics ==
Dramatic and musical entertainment, artisan demonstrations, dancing, parades, and lectures or discussions on literary or historical topics may be part of the events. Costumed entertainers often impersonate characters from Dickens' novels, as well as historical figures such as Queen Victoria.

== Origins ==
The first known Dickens fair was arranged by the Rev. F. J. Mills during July 1897 in the English seaside town of Broadstairs. Broadstairs also lays claim to the longest running Dickens fair, The Broadstairs Dickens Festival, which was founded by Captain Miles Conway Robson in 1937. Unlike most British and American Dickensian fairs that take place in December, Broadstairs Dickens Festival is usually held in the second or third week of June.

== History of Dickens fairs in the United States ==
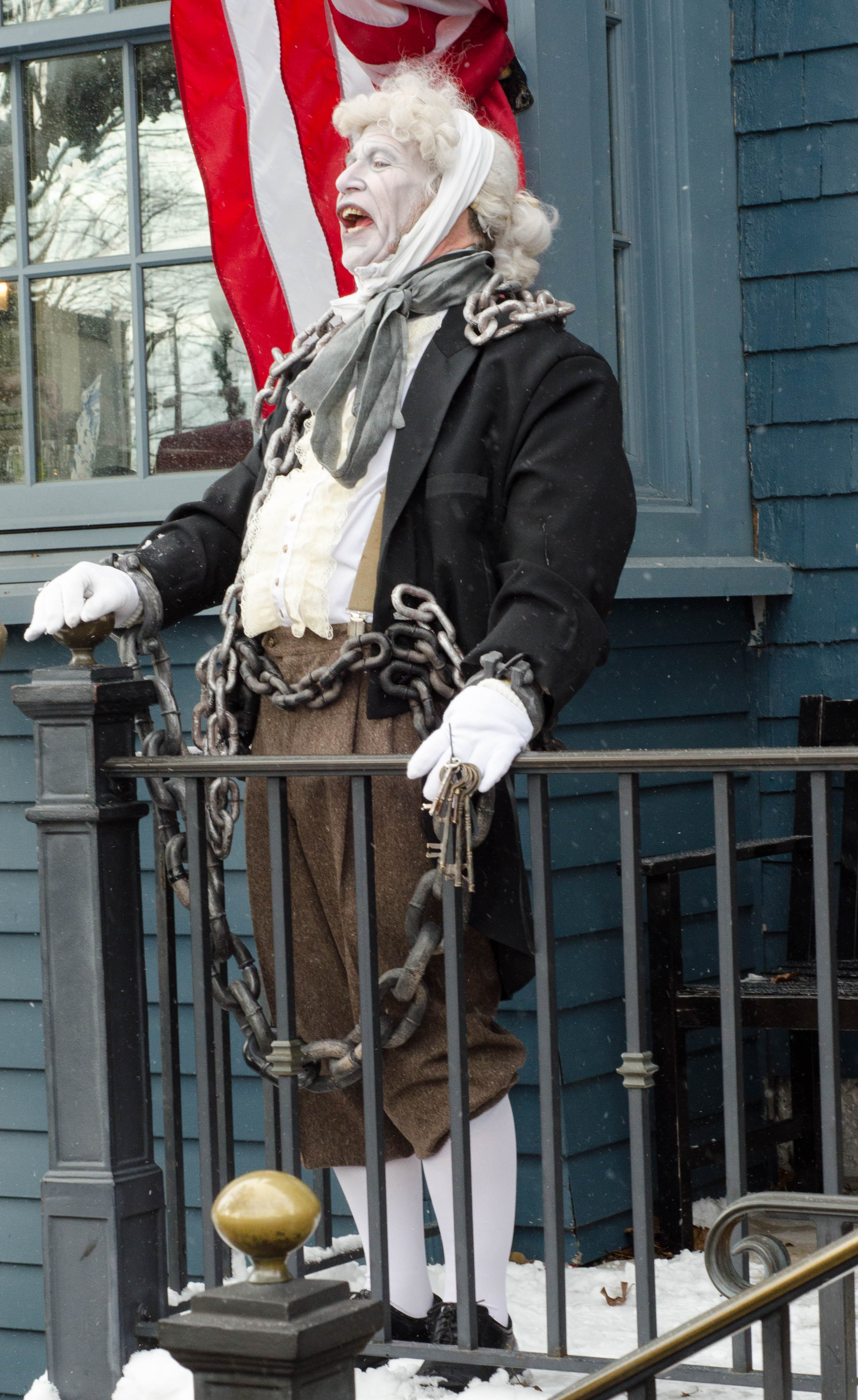
A performer dressed as Jacob Marley at the Dickens Christmas event in Skaneateles, New York

Ron Patterson and his wife Phyllis started the first "Renaissance Pleasure Faire" in southern California in 1963, making it an annual event beginning in spring 1966. Five years later, they initiated a fall Renaissance fair in the San Francisco Bay Area with a harvest theme. These traditions took root locally and spread across the country. They then launched the Great Dickens Christmas Fair, an indoor event, in San Francisco in 1970. This has also inspired similar events across the U.S.

== Contemporary Dickens fairs in England ==
Beginning in the 1980s, the English town of Ware began hosting a Charles Dickens themed carnival during the first week of December to welcome the arrival of Santa Claus. The 25th Dickensian Evening was held in 2019. Townspeople wear Victorian costumes, local businesses and volunteer groups run food and gift stalls to raise money for charity, actors perform short, open-air plays such as A Christmas Carol, a craft fair is held in the drill hall, a nativity scene is unveiled in St Mary's Church, a choir sings Christmas carols in the churchyard, puppeteers and street musicians entertain the public, and fairground rides and games are hosted in the town centre. The highlight of the evening involves the mayor turning on the Christmas lights and leading a procession featuring costumed performers and dancers, horse drawn beer wagons from McMullen's Brewery, the town crier, carnival floats, and marching band(s). The 26th Dickensian Evening was relaunched in December 2022, after being cancelled in 2020 and 2021 due to the COVID-19 pandemic. For the 29th Dickensian Evening of 2025, a parade of historic carnival lanterns was introduced for the first time. The 30th Dickensian evening is expected to take place on December 4, 2026.

The commercialised American approach was later exported to England. A warehouse-based theme park, Dickens World, opened in Kent, England, in May 2007. It closed on 12 October 2016.

Other towns that organise yearly Dickensian fairs in December include Whitby, Lostwithiel, Tavistock, and Weymouth, Dorset. Whitby's Dickensian evening is unique as it incorporates steampunk and gothic horror themes.

== See also ==
- Renaissance fair
- Revels
- Neo-Victorian
- Steampunk
- Victoriana
