= Bleak House, Broadstairs =

House in Kent

Coordinates: 51°21′35″N 1°26′42″E

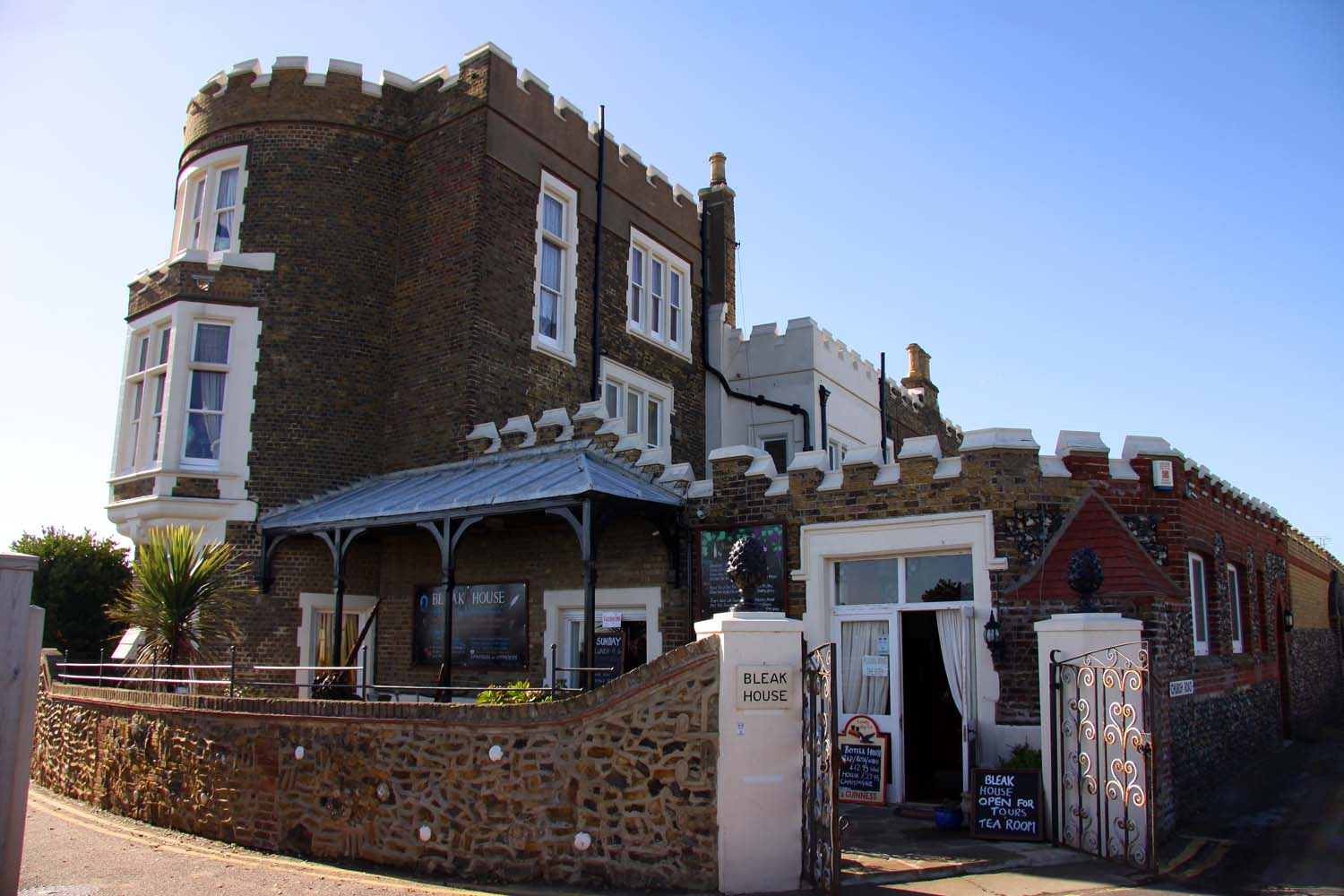
Bleak House from Fort Road

Bleak House (originally known as Fort House) is a prominent house on the cliff overlooking the North Foreland and Viking Bay in Broadstairs, Kent. It was built around 1801 and then substantially extended, doubling in size, in 1901. The house was the site of the North Cliff Battery and was used as a coastal station for observing maritime activity.

Charles Dickens holidayed at Fort House in the 1850s and 1860s, and wrote David Copperfield during his time there. He is also said to have penned out Bleak House whilst in residence, hence the change of name in the early 1900s.

The house is Grade II listed on the National Heritage List for England.

== History ==
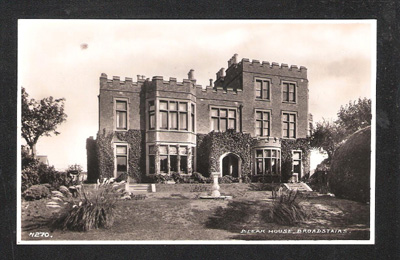
The house in 1920

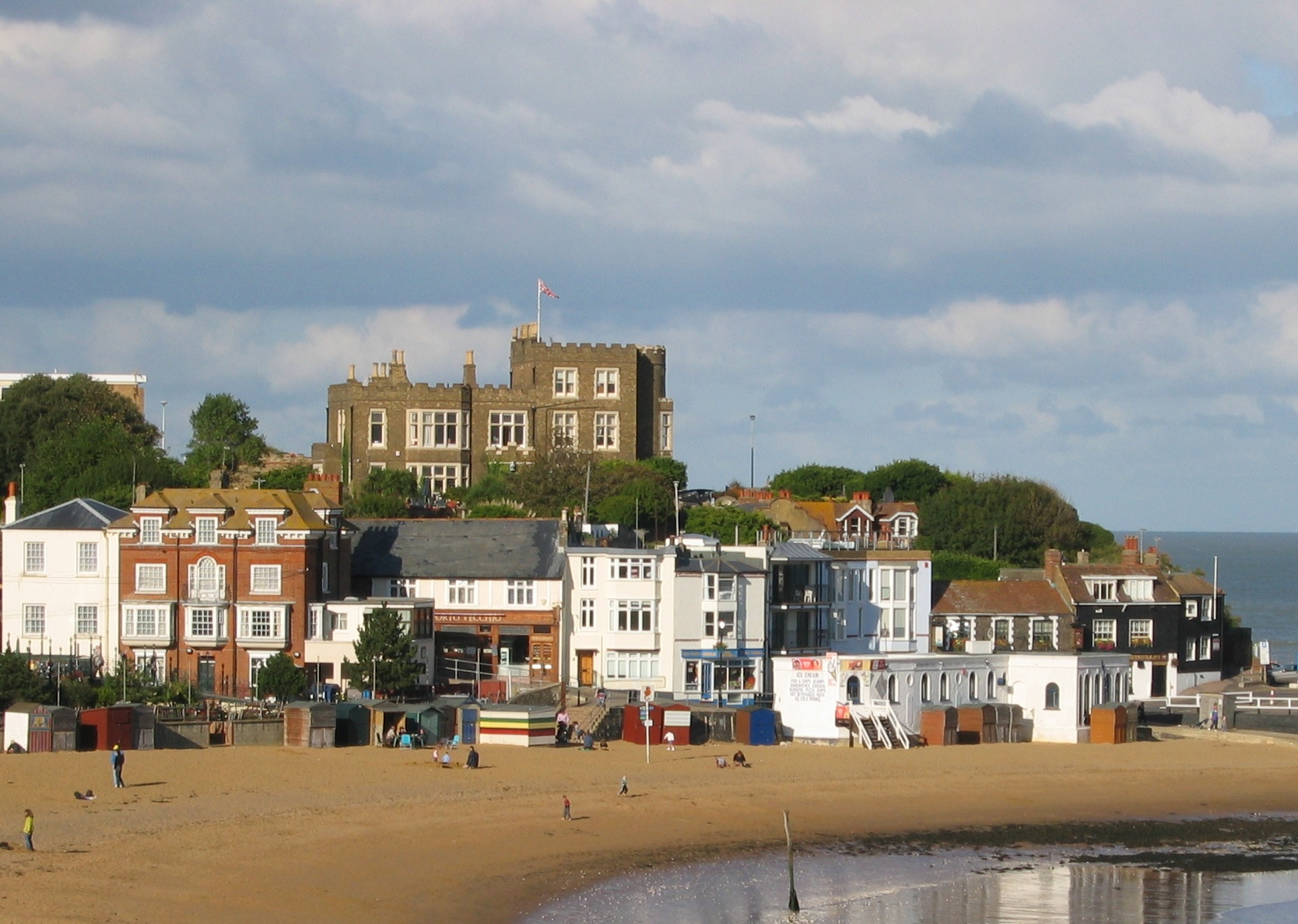
Bleak House overlooking Broadstairs

Bleak House was originally called Fort House and was the residence of a captain of one of the two coastal forts guarding Broadstairs, the town in which it is situated.

=== Association with Charles Dickens ===
Charles Dickens leased Fort House from the 1840s till 1852. It was there in that "airy nest" above the harbour that he wrote David Copperfield. Fort House was dubbed Bleak House in the early part of the 20th century. Somebody asserted that it was the Bleak House referred to in Dickens' 1853 novel, and the name stuck. There has been much dispute over the truth of the claim. Some people believe that the house from which Dickens took his inspiration is far distant from Broadstairs. What can be certain is that the house held a special attraction for Dickens, and was the residence he "most desired" in his most favourite of watering places, Broadstairs. The famous Danish author Hans Christian Andersen was a regular guest during this time.

In the novel Sophy Laurie, published in 1865, William Carew Hazlitt writes: It is at Broadstairs they are staying; in the big, bleak house that stands alone on a peak of the chalk cliff, as if it were some sentinel set over the rovers up and down the sea.

For much of the 20th century, Bleak House was in two quite distinct parts, serving as both a private residence and a Dickens memorial museum. In 2012 the previous owners opened the house as a wedding venue and guest house. It is now under new ownership and is a private residence once again, as of January 2021. It is being restored back to its former glory by the Hilton family.

== Smuggling ==
Broadstairs, like many coastal places around England, had something of a reputation for smuggling in the 18th and early 19th centuries. The current establishment has a Smugglers Museum below deck, however this has not been reopened by the new owners of Bleak House.
