= Dickens Fellowship =

Literary society dedicated to Charles Dickens

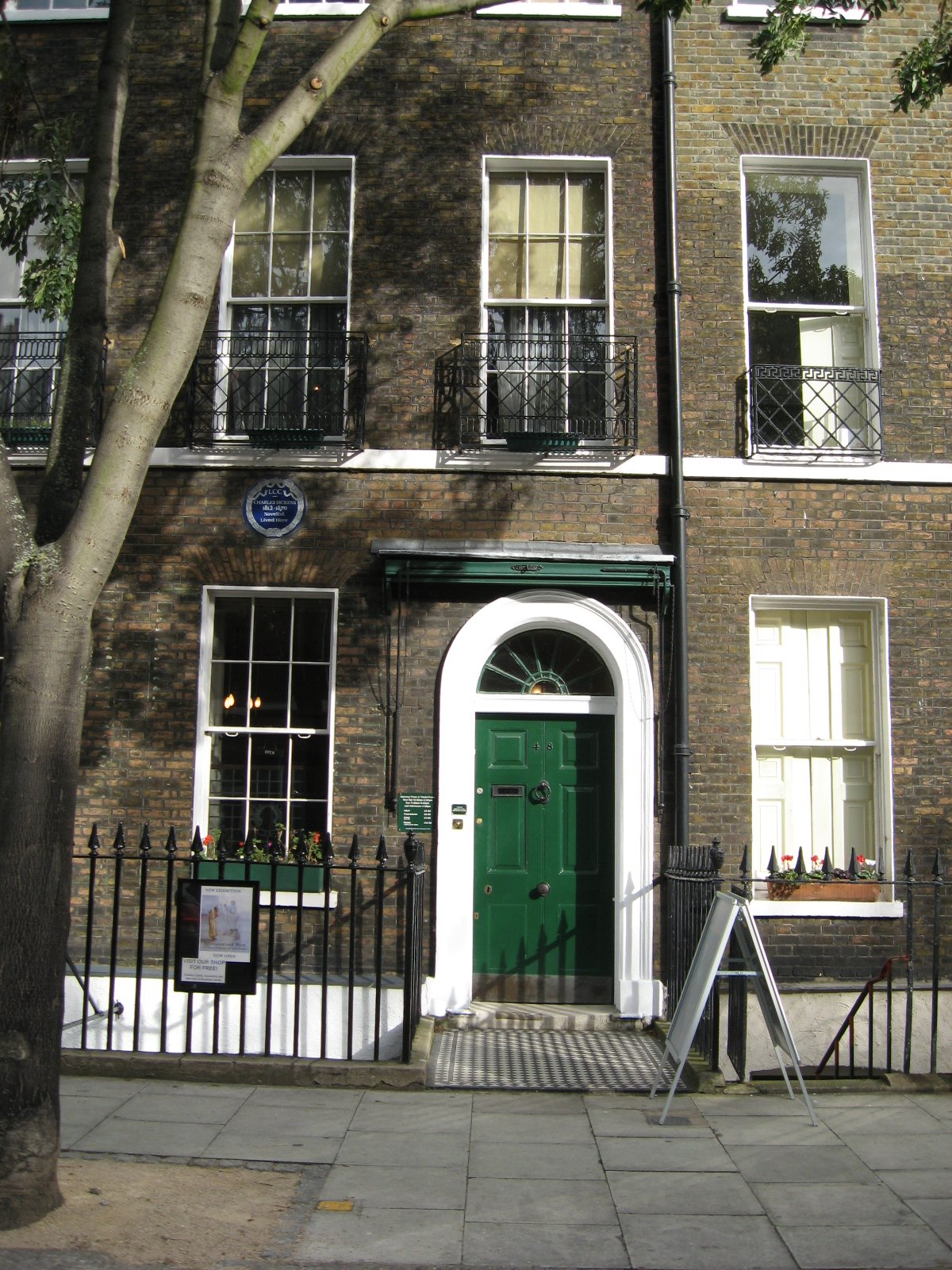
Charles Dickens Museum in London, the headquarters of The Dickens Fellowship

The Dickens Fellowship was founded in 1902, and is an international association of people from all walks of life who share an interest in the life and works of Victorian era novelist Charles Dickens.

The Dickens Fellowship's head office is based at the Charles Dickens Museum in Doughty Street in London, England, the home of Charles Dickens from 1837 to 1839. In 1923 Dickens's former home at 48 Doughy Street was threatened with demolition, but it was saved by three members of the Dickens Fellowship, who raised a mortgage and bought the freehold in 1925. The membership of the Fellowship raised funds and put together a collection to exhibit in it. The Dickens House Trust was established to run the house as a museum and library.

Membership is open to anybody, anywhere in the world, who shares the Fellowship's interests. The Fellowship has 47 branches, which are in the UK, the United States and nine other countries. Each branch is independent and arranges its own programme of events. There are also five affiliated societies.

The Fellowship publishes a journal, The Dickensian, which was founded in 1905 and was originally edited by one of the leading founders of the Fellowship, B.W. Matz (1865–1925). The Dickensian publishes articles of literary criticism from scholars around the world. It also carries reviews of books, plays, films and TV productions, together with reports of Fellowship activities and other Dickens-related news. The current editor is Dr. Emily Bell of the University of Leeds.

In 2002 the Fellowship campaigned to save an area of Kent marshland on the Hoo Peninsula which provided the setting to the opening chapter of Dickens's novel Great Expectations where the young Pip first encountered the escaped convict Magwitch.
