= Gads Hill Place =

Country home of Charles Dickens

Coordinates: 51°24′40″N 0°27′28″E

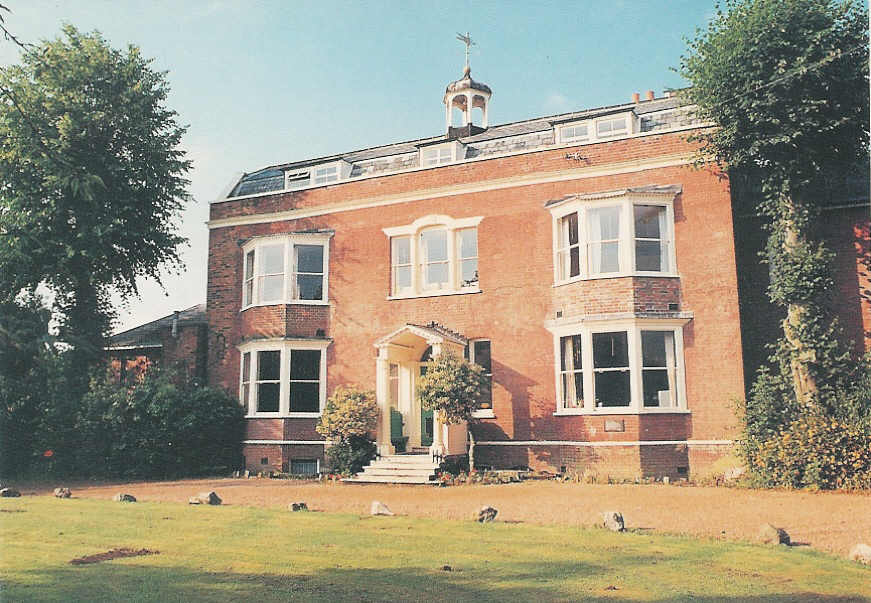
Gads Hill Place today

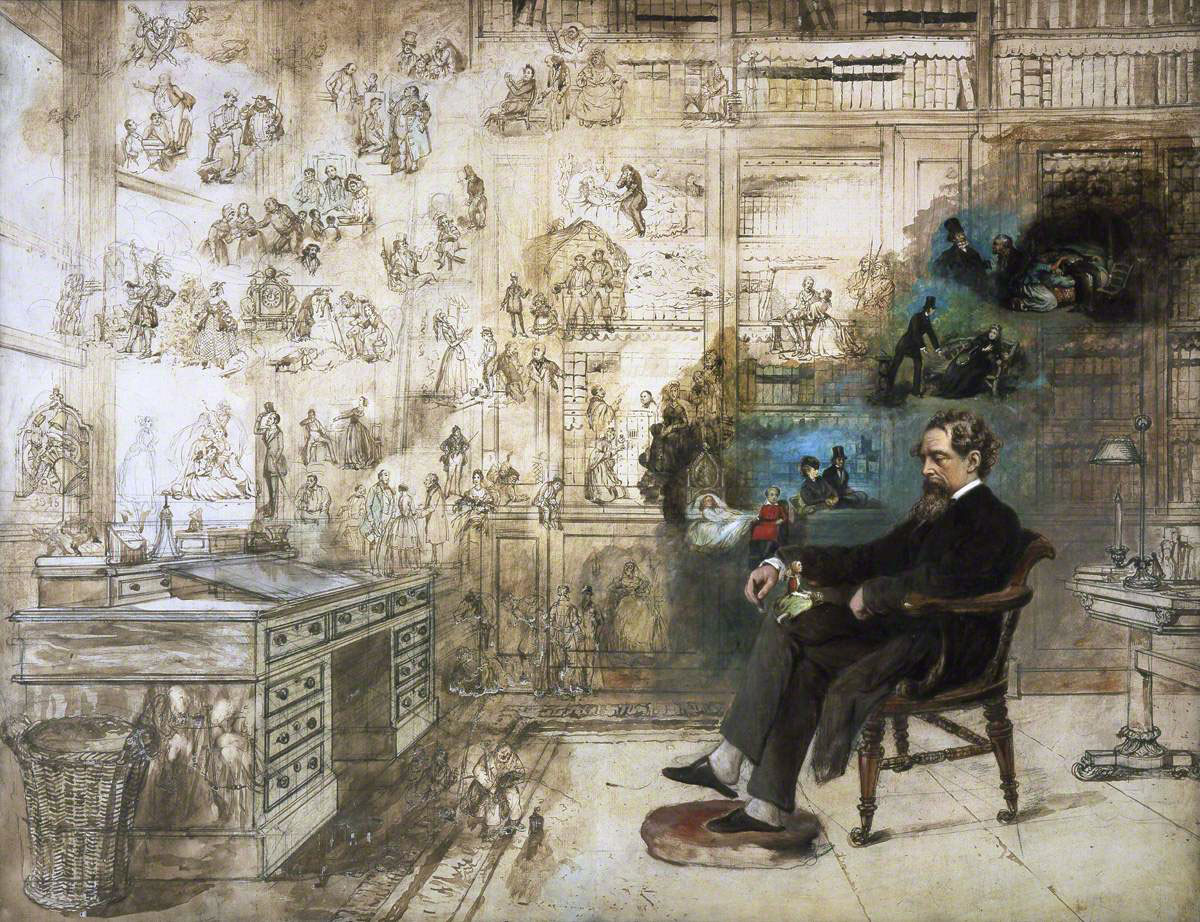
Dickens' Dream by Robert William Buss, portraying Dickens at his desk at Gads Hill surrounded by many of his characters

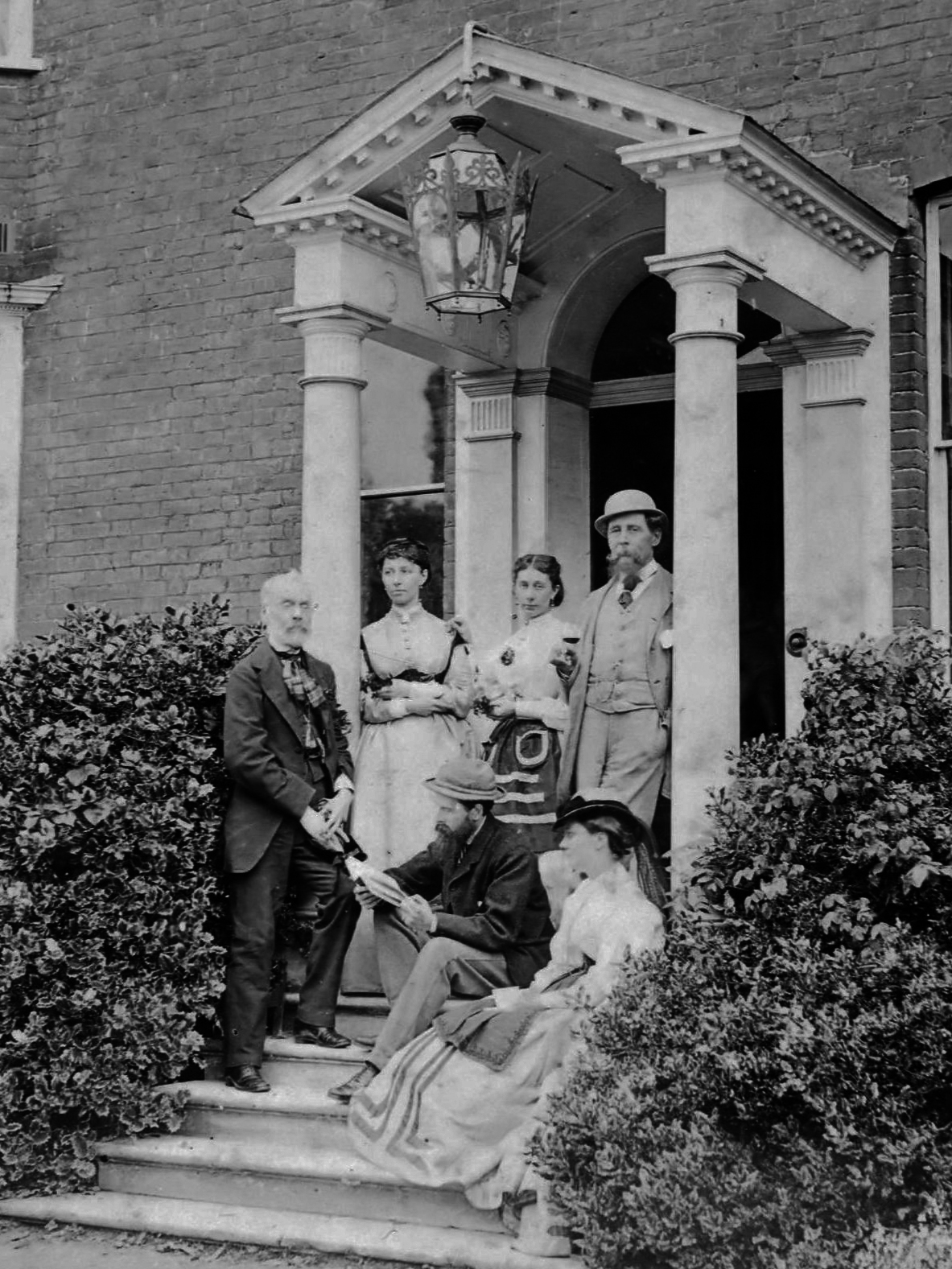
Group portrait in the porch at Gads Hill Place in 1862, H.F. Chorley, Kate Dickens, Mamie Dickens, Charles Dickens, C.A. Collins and Georgina Hogarth

Gad's Hill Place in Higham, Kent, sometimes spelt Gadshill Place and Gads Hill Place, was the country home of Charles Dickens. Today the building is the independent Gad's Hill School.

The house was built in 1780 for a former mayor of Rochester, Thomas Stephens, opposite the present Sir John Falstaff Public House. Gad's Hill is where Falstaff commits the robbery that begins William Shakespeare's Henriad trilogy (Henry IV, Part 1, Henry IV, Part 2 and Henry V).

== Dickens ==
Charles Dickens first saw the mansion when he was 'not half as old as 9', when his father John Dickens told Charles that if he worked hard enough, one day he would own it or just such a house. As a boy, Dickens would often walk from Chatham to Gad's Hill Place as he wished to see it again and again as an image of his possible future. Dickens was later to write, " I used to look at it as a wonderful Mansion (which God knows it is not) when I was a very odd little child with the first faint shadows of all my books in my head - I suppose." Thirty-five years later, after Dickens had risen to fame and wealth, he discovered that the house was for sale and bought it for £1790 (circa £246,636 as of 2023) in March 1856 from fellow writer Eliza Lynn (later known as novelist Mrs. Eliza Lynn Linton). Initially Dickens bought the house as an investment, intending to let it, but changed his mind and used it instead as a country retreat, moving into the house in June 1857.

Dickens had bookshelves installed in his study at Gad's Hill Place, some of which contained dummy books the titles of which he invented to reflect his own prejudices and opinions, including Hansard's Guide to Refreshing Sleep, History of a Short Chancery Suit in twenty-one volumes, Socrates on Wedlock, King Henry the Eighth's Evidences of Christianity, and the series The Wisdom of Our Ancestors: I Ignorance, II Superstition, III The Block, IV The Stake, V The Rack, VI Dirt, and VII Disease. Alongside these was placed a very narrow dummy volume entitled The Virtues of Our Ancestors.

Dickens was visited at Gad's Hill Place in 1857 by Danish author and poet Hans Christian Andersen, who was invited for two weeks but who stayed for five. Other guests included Henry Wadsworth Longfellow, Charles Allston Collins, Wilkie Collins, Marcus Stone, H.F. Chorley, Percy Fitzgerald, John Leech, Alexander William Kinglake, William Powell Frith and Charles Fechter.

In 1864 Fechter gave Dickens a prefabricated two-storey Swiss chalet as a Christmas present. Dickens had it assembled on land he owned on the opposite side of the Rochester High Road, known by the family as the Wilderness, which was accessible by a tunnel that he had built between the two areas some years earlier. Dickens worked on many of his later works in his study on the top floor of this Swiss chalet, including A Tale of Two Cities, Great Expectations, Our Mutual Friend and the unfinished The Mystery of Edwin Drood. The chalet has been preserved and was moved to Eastgate House in Rochester High Street, Rochester, as a memorial to the writer.

The house remained Dickens's country home until his death in 1870, dying as he did of a stroke on a couch in the dining room there. Much of the contents of the house were auctioned after his death.

== Later history ==
Gad's Hill Place was bought by Charles Dickens, Jr. after his father's death, but he was forced to give it up in 1879 because of his own ill-health and financial difficulties. The house was bought in 1890 by the Hon. Francis Law Latham, the then Advocate-General of Bombay. In 1924 the house became Gad's Hill School, which it remains today.

As of 2013, the school was moving into purpose-built buildings in the grounds of the house, and there was a plan to open the house as a museum.

In June 2008 the house was shown in the Channel 4 TV docudrama Dickens' Secret Lover, presented by actor Charles Dance, on Dickens's affair with the actress Ellen Ternan during the last 13 years of his life.

Gads Hill Place is a Grade I listed building.
