= Racism in the work of Charles Dickens =

Charles Dickens's racism

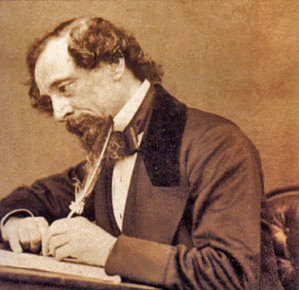
Dickens in 1858

Scholars have discussed the topic of racism in the works of 19th-century English author Charles Dickens, with increased focus in the 20th and 21st centuries. While Dickens was known to be highly sympathetic to the plight of the poor and disadvantaged in British society, like many other authors of the period he expressed attitudes in his journalism and works which have been interpreted as racist and xenophobic. Dickens frequently defended the privileges held by Europeans in overseas colonies and was dismissive of what he termed "primitive" cultures. The Oxford Dictionary of English Literature describes Dickens as a nationalist who frequently stigmatised non-European cultures.

Some scholars have disputed the charge that Dickens was racist. Dickens scholar Priti Joshi, for example, maintains that he never advocated any form of scientific racism in his works, but held extreme antipathy for non-European peoples, and steadfastly believed in their assimilation into Western culture. Other scholars, such as Grace Moore, claim that Dickens' racism abated in his later years, while historian Patrick Brantlinger and journalist William Oddie have instead claimed that his racism intensified during that period. Moore contends that while in his later years Dickens became more aware of the mistreatment of non-European peoples under the system of colonialism, he never lost his antipathy for their culture, consistently maintaining that it was inferior to Western culture.

== Controversies over Dickens' racism ==
Many scholars have commented on the contrast between his support for liberal causes at home and lack of such support for liberal causes abroad. In a private letter to Emily de la Rue, Dickens wrote the following passage on Indians: "You know faces, when they are not brown; you know common experiences when they are not under turbans; Look at the dogs – low, treacherous, murderous, tigerous villains." Dickens also called for the "extermination" of the Indian people and applauded the "mutilation" of the "wretched Hindoo" who were punished by being blown from the guns for the involvement in the Indian Rebellion of 1857. In his 1990 biography, Peter Ackroyd noted Dickens' sympathy for the poor, opposition to child labour, involvement in campaigns for sanitation reform, and opposition to capital punishment. He also asserted that "In modern terminology Dickens was a "racist" of the most egregious kind, a fact that ought to give pause to those who persist in believing that he was necessarily the epitome of all that was decent and benign in the previous century."

According to Ackroyd, Dickens did not believe that the Union in the American Civil War was genuinely interested in the abolition of slavery, and he nearly publicly supported the Confederacy for that reason. Ackroyd twice noted that Dickens' major objection to missionaries was that they were more concerned with the welfare of non-Europeans abroad than with the poor at home in Europe. For example, in Bleak House Dickens mocks Mrs. Jellyby, who neglects her children to care for the inhabitants of a fictional African country. The disjunction between Dickens' criticism of slavery and his stereotypical depiction of other races has also been a topic considered by Patrick Brantlinger in his 2002 A Companion to the Victorian Novel. He cites Dickens' description of an Irish-American settlement in America's Catskill mountains as a mess of pigs, pots, and dunghills. According to Brantlinger, Dickens viewed them as a "racially repellent" group. Jane Smiley, in her Penguin Lives biography of Dickens, writes "we should not interpret him as the kind of left-liberal we know today – he was racist, imperialist, sometimes antisemitic, a believer in harsh prison conditions, and distrustful of trade unions". An opening note to Charles Dickens' Australia, a selection of Dickens' essays from Household Words, noted to the reader that in these essays "Women, the Irish, Chinese and Aborigines are described in biased, racist, stereotypical or otherwise less than flattering terms." The Historical Encyclopedia of Anti-Semitism notes the paradox of Dickens both being a "champion of causes of the oppressed" who abhorred slavery and supported the European liberal revolutions of the 1840s, and his creation of the antisemitic caricature of the character of Fagin.

Scholar Priti Joshi, in her contribution to Dickens in Context examined the contrast between Dickens' racism and his concern with the poor and downcast. Joshi argues that Dicken was a nativist and a "cultural chauvinist" in the sense of being highly ethnocentric and supportive of imperialism, but maintains that he was not a racist in the sense of being a "biological determinist" as was the anthropologist Robert Knox. That is, Dickens did not regard the behaviour of races to be "fixed"; rather his appeal to "civilization" suggests not biological fixity but the possibility of alteration. However, "Dickens's views of racial others, most fully developed in his short fiction, indicate that for him 'savages' functioned as a handy foil against which British national identity could emerge".

The Oxford Encyclopedia of British Literature similarly notes that while Dickens praised middle-class values,

Dickens's militancy about this catalog of virtues had nationalistic implications, since he praised these middle-class moral ideals as English national values. Conversely, he often stigmatized foreign cultures as lacking in these middle-class ideas, representing French, Italian, and American characters, in particular, as slothful and deceitful. His attitudes toward colonized peoples sometimes took these moral aspersions to genocidal extremes. In the wake of the so-called Indian Mutiny of 1857, he wrote, "I should do my utmost to exterminate the Race upon whom the stain of the late cruelties rested ... ." To be fair, Dickens did support the antislavery movement ... . And he excoriated what he saw as English national vices ...

William Oddie argues that Dickens's racism "grew progressively more illiberal over the course of his career," particularly after the Indian Rebellion. Grace Moore, on the other hand, argues in her 2004 work Dickens and Empire that Dickens, a staunch abolitionist and anti-imperialist, had views on racial matters that were a good deal more complex than previous critics have suggested. She suggests that overemphasising Dickens' racism obscures his continued commitment to the abolition of slavery. Laurence Mazzeno has characterised Moore's approach as depicting Dickens' attitude to race as highly complex, "struggling to differentiate between ideas of race and class in his fiction...sometimes in step with his age, sometimes its fiercest critic." Others have observed that Dickens also opposed granting voting rights to African Americans, writing in a letter "Free of course he must be; but the stupendous absurdity of making him a voter glares out of every roll of his eye". Bernard Porter suggests that Dickens' racism caused him to actually oppose imperialism rather than promote it, citing the character of Mrs. Jellyby in Bleak House and the essay The Noble Savage as evidence. However, Dickens did not join other liberals in condemning the Governor of Jamaica Eyre's declaration of martial law after an attack on the capital's courthouse. In speaking on the controversy, Dickens' attacked "that platform sympathy with the black- or the native or the Devil.."

In an essay on George Eliot, K.M. Newton writes:

Most of the major writers in the Victorian period can be seen as racist to a greater or lesser degree. According to Edward Said, even Marx and Mill are not immune: 'both of them seemed to have believed that such ideas as liberty, representative government, and individual happiness must not be applied to the Orient for reasons that today we would call racist'. In many of these writers antisemitism was the most obvious form of racism, and this continued beyond the Victorian period, as is evident in such figures as T.S. Eliot and Virginia Woolf.

== Fagin and antisemitism in Oliver Twist ==
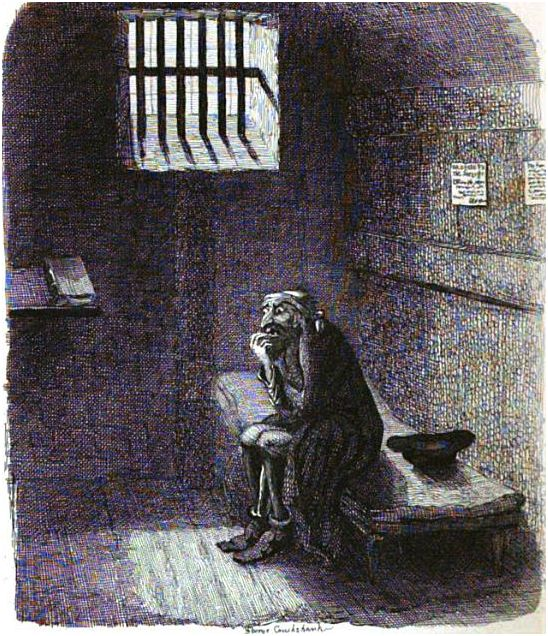
An illustration from Oliver Twist, depicting Fagin waiting to be hanged.

One of the most controversial characters created by Dickens is the British Jew Fagin in the novel Oliver Twist, first published in serial form between 1837 and 1839. The character of Fagin has been seen by many as being stereotypical and containing antisemitic tropes, though others, such as Dickens's biographer G. K. Chesterton have argued against this view. Scholars have noted that the novel refers to Fagin 257 times in the first 38 chapters as "the Jew", while the ethnicity or religion of the other characters is rarely mentioned. Paul Vallely wrote in The Independent that Dickens's Fagin in Oliver Twist—the Jew who runs a school in London for child pickpockets—is regularly seen as one of the most grotesque Jewish characters in English literature. The character is thought to have been partly based on Ikey Solomon, a Jewish criminal in Victorian era-London, who was interviewed by Dickens during the latter's time as a journalist. Nadia Valdman, who specialises in the portrayal of Jewish people in literature, argues that Fagin's representation was drawn from images of Jews created by non-Jews as "inherently evil" as associated with the Devil and beasts. Antisemitism: A Historical Encyclopedia of Prejudice and Persecution argues that the image of Fagin is "drawn from stage melodrama and medieval images". Fagin has also been described by scholars as one who seduces young children into a life of crime, and as someone who can "disorder representational boundaries".

In 1854, The Jewish Chronicle published an article which questioned why "Jews alone should be excluded from the 'sympathizing heart' of this great author and powerful friend of the oppressed". Eliza Davis, whose husband had purchased Dickens's home in 1860 when he had put it up for sale, wrote to Dickens in protest against his portrayal of Jews (specifically Fagin), arguing that he had "encouraged a vile prejudice against the despised Hebrew", and that he had done a great wrong to the Jewish people. Dickens had described her husband at the time of the sale as a "Jewish moneylender" (but also as an "honest gentleman").

Dickens protested that he was merely being factual about the realities of street crime in London in his depiction of criminals in their "squalid misery", yet he took Mrs Davis's complaint seriously; he halted the printing of Oliver Twist, and changed the text for the parts of the book that had not been set, which is why Fagin is called "the Jew" 257 times in the first 38 chapters, but barely at all in the next 179 references to him. In his later novel Our Mutual Friend, he created the character of Riah (meaning "friend" in Hebrew), whose goodness, Vallely writes, is almost as complete as Fagin's evil. Riah says in the novel: "Men say, 'This is a bad Greek, but there are good Greeks. This is a bad Turk, but there are good Turks.' Not so with the Jews ... they take the worst of us as samples of the best ..." Davis sent Dickens a copy of the Hebrew bible in gratitude. Dickens not only toned down Fagin's Jewishness in revised editions of Oliver Twist, but he removed Jewish elements from his depiction of Fagin in his public readings from the novel, omitting nasal voice mannerisms and body language he had included in earlier readings.

=== Stage and screen adaptations ===
Joel Berkowitz reports that the earliest stage adaptations of Oliver Twist "followed by an almost unrelieved procession of Jewish stage distortions, and even helped to popularize a lisp for stage Jewish characters that lasted until 1914". It is widely believed that the most antisemitic adaptation of Oliver Twist is David Lean's film of 1948, with Alec Guinness as Fagin. Guinness was made-up to look like the illustrations from the novel's first edition. The film's release in the US was delayed until 1951 due to Jewish protests, and was initially released with several of Fagin's scenes cut. This particular adaptation of the novel was banned in Israel. Contrastingly, the film was banned in Egypt for portraying Fagin too sympathetically. When George Lucas's film Star Wars: Episode I – The Phantom Menace was released, he denied the claim made by some critics that the unscrupulous trader Watto (who has a hooked nose) was a Faginesque Jewish stereotype. Animator Rob Coleman later admitted that he had viewed footage of Alec Guinness as Fagin in Oliver Twist to inspire his animators in creating Watto.

The role of Fagin in Oliver Twist continues to be a challenge for actors who struggle with questions as to how to interpret the role in a post-Holocaust era. Various Jewish writers, directors, and actors have searched for ways to "salvage" Fagin. In recent years, Jewish performers and writers have attempted to 'reclaim' Fagin as has been done with Shakespeare's Shylock in The Merchant of Venice. The composer of the 1960s musical Oliver!, Lionel Bart, was Jewish, and he wrote songs for the character with a Jewish rhythm and Jewish orchestration. In spite of the musical's Jewish provenance, Jewish playwright Julia Pascal believes that performing the show today is still inappropriate, an example of a minority acting out on a stereotype to please a host society. Pascal claimed that "U.S. Jews are not exposed to the constant low-level anti-Semitism that filters through British society". In contrast to Pascal, The actor David Schneider, who studied for a PhD on Yiddish, found the Dickens novel, wherein Fagin is simply "the Jew," a difficult read, but saw Fagin in the musical as "a complex character" who was not "the baddie." Stage producer Menachem Golan also created a less well-known Hebrew musical of Oliver Twist.

Some more recent actors who have portrayed Fagin have tried to downplay Fagin's Jewishness, but actor Timothy Spall emphasised it while also making Fagin sympathetic. For Spall, Fagin is the first adult character in the story with actual warmth. He is a criminal, but is at least looking out for children more than the managers of Twist's workhouse. Spall says "The fact is, even if you were to turn Fagin into a Nazi portrayal of a Jew, there is something inherently sympathetic in Dickens's writing. I defy anyone to come away with anything other than warmth and pity for him." Jewish actors who have portrayed Fagin on stage include Richard Kline, Ron Moody in the Oscar-winning film of the musical Oliver!, and Richard Dreyfuss in a Disney live-action TV production.

Will Eisner's 2003 graphic novel Fagin the Jew retells the story of Oliver Twist from Fagin's perspective, both humanising Fagin and making him authentically Jewish.

Polish Jewish filmmaker Roman Polanski directed a film adaptation of Oliver Twist in 2005. Concerning the portrayal of Fagin by Ben Kingsley in his film, Polanski said:

It's still a Jewish stereotype but without going overboard. He is not a Hassidic Jew. But his accent and looks are Jewish of the period. Ben said a very interesting thing. He said that with all his amoral approach to life, Fagin still provides a living for these kids. Of course, you can't condone pickpocketing. But what else could they do?

In the same interview, Polanski described elements of Oliver Twist which echo his own childhood as an orphan in Nazi-occupied Poland. In his review of the film, Norman Lebrecht argues that many previous adaptations of Oliver Twist have merely avoided the problem, but that Polanski found a solution "several degrees more original and convincing than previous fudges", noting that "Rachel Portman's attractive score studiously underplays the accompaniment of Jewish music to Jewish misery" and also that "Ben Kingsley endows the villain with tragic inevitability: a lonely old man, scrabbling for trinkets of security and a little human warmth", concluding that "It was certainly Dickens' final intention that 'the Jew' should be incidental in Oliver Twist and in his film Polanski has given the story a personal dimension that renders it irreproachably universal."

== African Americans in American Notes ==
Dickens's attitudes towards African Americans were also complex. In American Notes he fiercely opposed the inhumanity of slavery in the United States, and expressed a desire for the abolition of American slavery. However, Grace Moore has commented that in the same work, Dickens includes a comic episode with an African-American coachman, presenting a grotesque description focused on the man's dark complexion and manner of movement, which to Dickens amounted to an "insane imitation of an English coachman". After the Civil War ended and the Thirteenth Amendment abolishing slavery was passed, Dickens wrote a letter in 1868 which alluded to the lack of education amongst newly emancipated African Americans, criticising "the melancholy absurdity of giving these people votes", which "at any rate at present, would glare out of every roll of their eyes, chuckle in their mouths, and bump in their heads".

== Native Americans in The Noble Savage ==
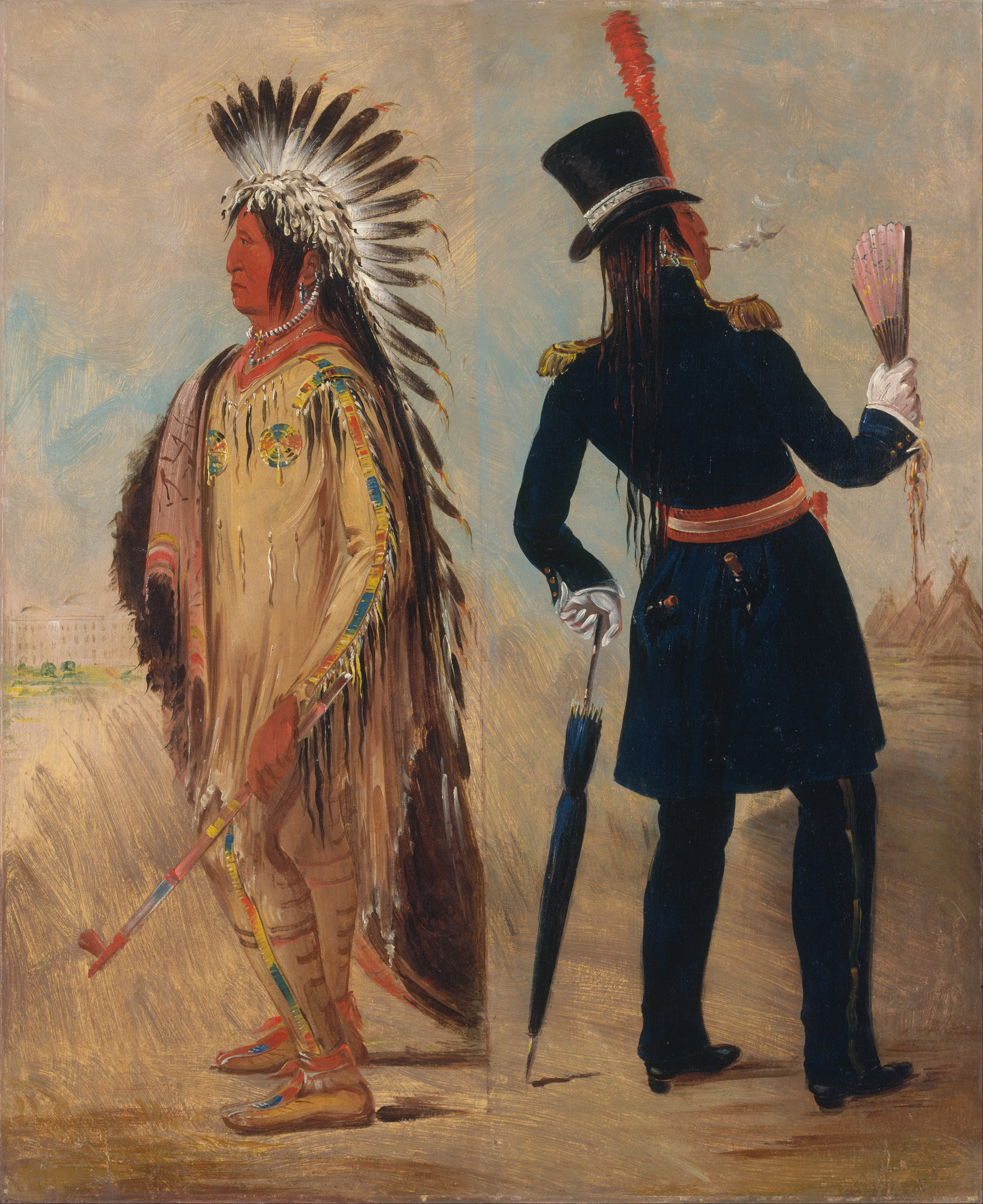
George Catlin's painting Savage and Tragically Civil contrast an unassimilated Native American favourably to his assimilated counterpart, a notion which incensed Dickens, prompting his Noble Savage essay

In his 1853 essay The Noble Savage, Dickens' expressed an attitude of "condescending pity" towards Native Americans, which Moore has contended is counterbalanced by a critical view of the attitude of whites in their dealing with them. The term "noble savage", referring to a stereotype of Native Americans as being superior in some form due to "lack of civilisation", was in circulation since the 17th century. Dickens regarded the term as an absurd oxymoron, advocating that savages be civilised "off the face of the earth". In the essay, Dickens ridiculed the philosophical exaltation of an idyllic primitive man living in greater harmony with nature, an idea prevalent in what is called "romantic primitivism" (often attributed to Rousseau). Dickens instead touted the superiority of Western culture, while denouncing Native Americans as "murderous". Dickens‘s essay was a response to painter George Catlin's exhibit of paintings of Native Americans (Catlin and Dickens both used the word "Indians") when it went on display in England. Dickens's expressed scorn for those unnamed individuals, who, like Catlin, he alleged, misguidedly exalted the so-called "noble savage". Dickens maintained that Native Americans and other "primitives" were dirty, cruel, and constantly fighting. Dickens's satire on Catlin and others like him who might find something to admire in the Native Americans or African tribesmen is considered by some to be a notable turning point in the history of the use of the phrase. At the conclusion of the essay, note as he argues that although the virtues of the savage are mythical and his way of life inferior and doomed, he still "deserves to be treated no differently than if he were an Englishman of genius, such as Newton or Shakespeare."

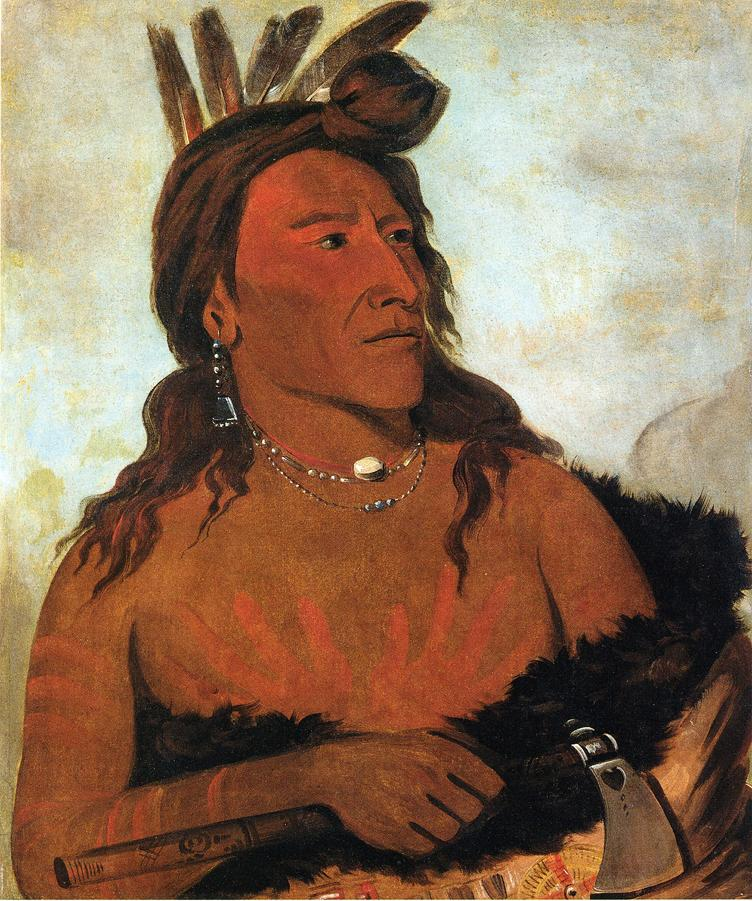
One of the paintings by George Catlin of Native Americans

Grace Moore in Dickens and Empire has argued that this essay served as a transitional piece for Dickens. Moore sees Dickens' earlier writings as marked by a swing between conflicting opinions on race. The essay Noble Savage itself has an aggressive beginning, but concludes with a plea for kindness, while at the same time Dickens settles into a more stereotyped form of thinking, engaging in sweeping generalisations about peoples he had never encountered, in a way he avoided doing in earlier writings such as in his review of Narrative of the Niger Expedition. Moore notes that, in the same essay, Dickens is critical of many aspects of British society, and indirectly suggests that these issues must be fixed before Britons can start criticising others.

Professor Sian Griffiths has noted that Dickens' essay exhibits many of the same "uncivil" qualities he attributes to "primitives" and writes:

Dickens' over-simplified defamation of Native American and African tribes seems largely prompted by what he saw as the over-simplified praise of the same people, evidenced in Caitlin's portraits... But by embracing the extreme opposing opinion, Dickens ultimately commits the same fault of failing to see the complexity of each individual human's character.

== Inuit in The Frozen Deep ==
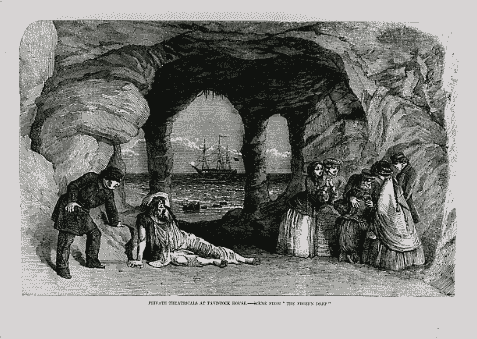
Scene from Dickens' play The Frozen Deep

Dickens, in collaboration with Wilkie Collins, wrote The Frozen Deep, which premiered in 1856, an allegorical play about the missing Arctic Franklin expedition, and which attacked the character of the Inuit as covetous and cruel. The purpose of the play was to discredit explorer John Rae's report on the fate of the expedition, which concluded that the crew had turned to cannibalism, and was based largely on Inuit testimonies. Dickens initially had a positive assessment of the Inuit, writing in "Our Phantom Ship on an Antediluvian Cruise" of the Inuit as "gentle loving savages", but after The Times published a report by Rae of the Inuit discovery of the remains of the lost Franklin expedition with evidence that the crew resorted to cannibalism, Dickens reversed his stand. Dickens, in addition to Franklin's widow, refused to accept the report and accused the Inuit of being liars, getting involved on Lady Franklin's side in an extended conflict with John Rae over the exact cause of the demise of the expedition. Lady Franklin maintained that the ship's crew, being Englishmen, could not possibly make a mistake during their expedition and were considered able to "survive anywhere" and "to triumph over any adversity through faith, scientific objectivity, and superior spirit". Dickens not only tried to discredit Rae and the Inuit, but accused the Inuit of being actively involved in the expedition's disaster. In "The Lost Arctic Voyagers", he wrote "It is impossible to form an estimate of the character of any race of savages from their deferential behaviour to the white man while he is strong. The mistake has been made again and again; and the moment the white man has appeared in the new aspect of being weaker than the savage, the savage has changed and sprung upon him." Explorer John Rae disputed with Dickens in two rebuttals (also published in Household Words). Rae defended the Inuit as "a bright example to civilized people" and compared them favourably to the undisciplined crew of Franklin. Keal writes that Rae was no match for "Dickens the story teller", one of Lady Franklin's "powerful friends", to many in England he was a Scotsman who was not "pledged to the patriotic, empire-building aims of the military." Rae was shunned by the English establishment as a result of his writing the report. Modern historians have vindicated Rae's belief that the Franklin crew resorted to cannibalism, having already been decimated by scurvy and starvation; furthermore they were poorly prepared for wilderness survival, contrary to Lady Hamilton's prejudices. In the play the Rae character was turned into a suspicious, power-hungry nursemaid, who predicted the expedition's doom in her effort to ruin the happiness of the delicate heroine.

During the filming of the 2008 Canadian documentary Passage, Gerald Dickens, Charles' great-great-grandson was introduced to explain "why such a great champion of the underdog had sided with the establishment". Dickens' negative portrayal of the Inuit was a hurt they carried from generation to generation, Tagak Curley an Inuk statesman, said to Gerald: "Your grandfather insulted my people. We have had to live with the pain of this for 150 years. This really harmed my people and is still harming them". Orkney historian Tom Muir is reported to have described Curley as "furious" and "properly upset". Gerald then apologised on behalf of the Dickens family, which Curley accepted on behalf of the Inuit. Muir describes this as a "historic moment".

== Chinese in Our Mutual Friend ==
In Our Mutual Friend, the character Bella is depicted as a docile housewife in Book the Fourth, Chapter V. Dickens portrays Bella’s husband’s married life as if he were “in a China house.” Following that line in the book, other racist descriptions of stereotypical Chinese features—such as “tight-eyed,” “odd-smelling silks,” and “pigtails pulling their heads of hair off”—further signify Charles Dickens’s sense of imperial superiority and his biases toward Chinese people.

For further readings, please see China in Dickens by Susan Schoenbayer Thurin, published in Dickens Quarterly, vol.8, no.3.
