= Noble savage =

Stock character

In Western anthropology, philosophy, and literature, the myth of the noble savage refers to a stock character who is uncorrupted by civilization. As such, the "noble" savage symbolizes the innate goodness and moral superiority of a primitive people living in harmony with nature. In the heroic drama of the stageplay The Conquest of Granada by the Spaniards (1672), the English playwright John Dryden represents the noble savage as an archetype of Man-as-Creature-of-Nature.

The intellectual politics of the Stuart Restoration (1660–1688) expanded Dryden's playwright usage of savage to denote a human wild beast and a wild man. Concerning civility and incivility, in the Inquiry Concerning Virtue, or Merit (1699), the philosopher Anthony Ashley-Cooper, 3rd Earl of Shaftesbury, said that men and women possess an innate morality, a sense of right and wrong conduct, which is based upon the intellect and the emotions, and not based upon religious doctrine.

In 18th-century anthropology, the term noble savage then denoted nature's gentleman, an ideal man born from the sentimentalism of moral sense theory. In the 19th century, in the essay "The Noble Savage" (1853), Charles Dickens rendered the noble savage into a rhetorical oxymoron by satirizing the British romanticisation of Primitivism in philosophy and in the arts made possible by moral sentimentalism.

In many ways, the myth of the noble savage entails fantasies about the non-West that cut to the core of the conversation in the social sciences about Orientalism, colonialism and exoticism. One question that emerges is whether an admiration of "the Other" as noble undermines or reproduces the dominant hierarchy, whereby the Other is subjugated by Western powers.

== Origins ==
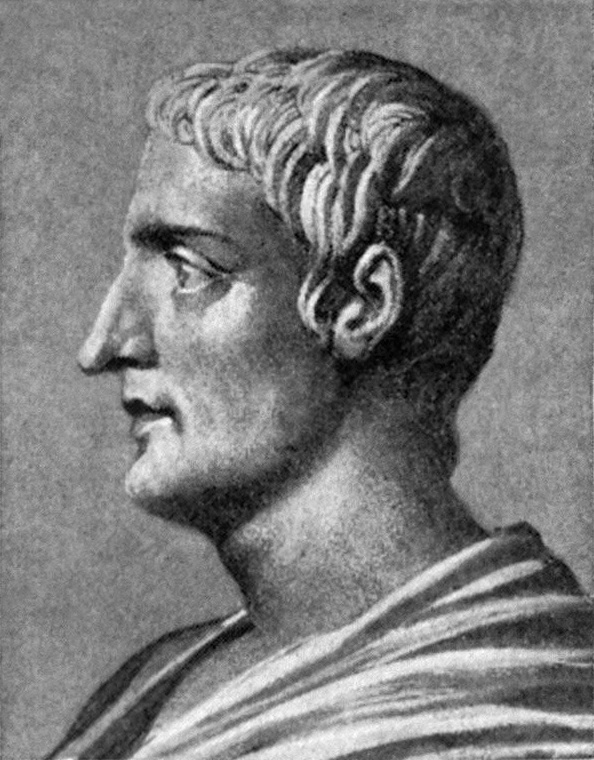
Roman historian Tacitus introduced the idea of the noble savage in his historical work Germania, describes the ancient Germanic people in terms that precede the notion.

The Roman historian Tacitus' description of ancient Germanic people in his 98 AD work De origine et situ Germanorum (On the Origin and Situation of the Germans) is an early iteration of the noble savage narrative. The Germanic population is positioned as a foil for Tacitus' Roman readers, who were in the corrupt and decaying phase of their Empire. Teutonic life is described as more virtuous and virile. Tacitus' depiction is similar to Julius Caesar's in Commentarii de Bello Gallico (Gallic War, c. 46 BC).

"Thus with their virtue protected they live uncorrupted by the allurements of public shows or the stimulant of feastings. Clandestine correspondence is equally unknown to men and women. Very rare for so numerous a population is adultery [...] No one in Germany laughs at vice, nor do they call it the fashion to corrupt and to be corrupted.

Ibn Tufail's 1160 Andalusian novel Hayy ibn Yaqdhan (The Living Son of the Vigilant) explores the subject of natural theology as a means to understand the material world. The protagonist is a wild man isolated from his society, whose rustic life in harmony with Mother Nature leads him to knowledge of Allah.

The 14th century Byzantine philosopher Theodore Metochites attempted to explain the loss of Asia Minor during the Ottoman conquests by going back to the work of Tacitus. He related the idea that the "Schythians" (mainly referring to Germanic, Turkic and Mongolic peoples) were more virtuous, as they were numerous, bellicose, and unsubjugated. He claimed that was because they lived a nomadic and simple life, free of material concerns. Historian Speros Vryonis criticised this view as oversimplified, as it ignores the fact that nomadic groups possessed certain crafts, engaged in commerce and marginal agriculture, and continuously interacted with settled peoples in symbiotic relationships.

Metochites is praising the “‘noble savage’’, who living close to nature is free of the artificialities of urban life which so pervert human character. [...] Metochites similarly converted Scythian barbarity into a state of moral purity so that using it as a foil he might attack the shortcomings of his own society. [...] The parallel between Metochites and Tacitus on this one point is striking. They are both moralizing and use the noble savage as a literary device to this end.

The stock character of the noble savage appears in the essay "Of Cannibals" (1580), about the Tupinambá people of Brazil, wherein the philosopher Michel de Montaigne presents "Nature's Gentleman", the bon sauvage counterpart to civilized Europeans in the 16th century.

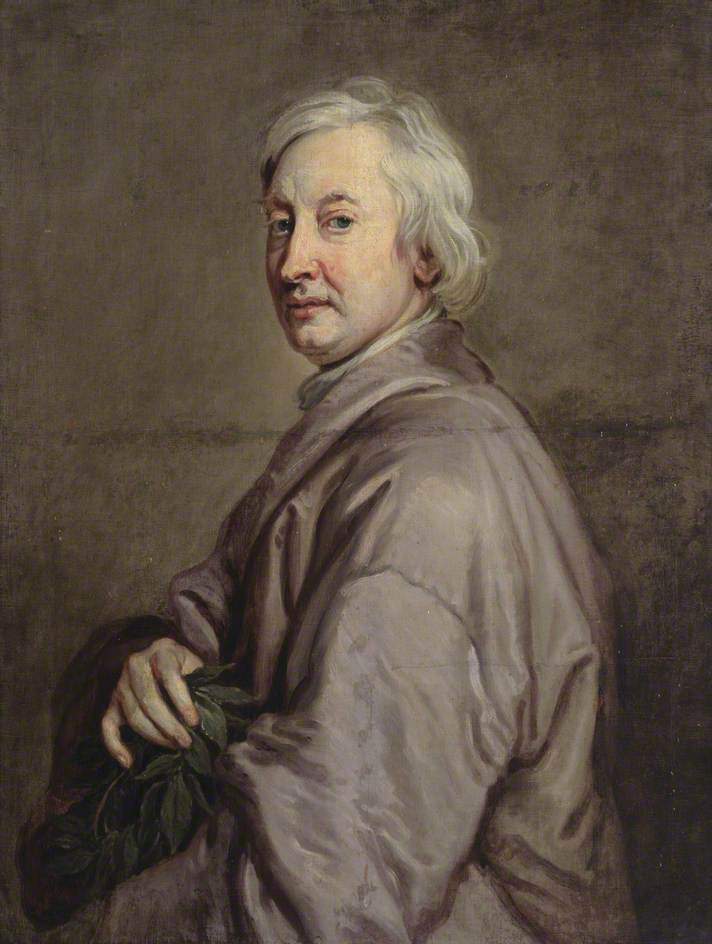
The playwright John Dryden coined the term "noble savage" in the stageplay The Conquest of Granada by the Spaniards (1672).

The first usage of the term noble savage in English literature occurs in John Dryden's stageplay The Conquest of Granada by the Spaniards (1672), about the troubled love of the hero Almanzor and the Moorish beauty Almahide, in which the protagonist defends his life as a free man by denying a prince's right to put him to death, because he is not a subject of the prince:

I am as free as nature first made man,
Ere the base laws of servitude began,
When wild in woods the noble savage ran.

By the 18th century, Montaigne's predecessor to the noble savage, nature's gentleman was a stock character usual to the sentimental literature of the time, for which a type of non-European Other became a background character for European stories about adventurous Europeans in the strange lands beyond continental Europe. For the novels, the opera, and the stageplays, the stock of characters included the "Virtuous Milkmaid" and the "Servant-More-Clever-Than-the-Master" (e.g. Sancho Panza and Figaro), literary characters who personify the moral superiority of working-class people in the fictional world of the story.

In English literature, British North America was the geographic locus classicus for adventure and exploration stories about European encounters with the noble savage natives, such as the historical novel The Last of the Mohicans (1826), by James Fenimore Cooper, and the epic poem The Song of Hiawatha (1855), by Henry Wadsworth Longfellow, both literary works presented the primitivism (geographic, cultural, political) of North America as an ideal place for the European man to commune with Nature, far from the artifice of civilisation.

== Cultural stereotype ==
=== Kingdom of Spain ===
The mytheme of the savage was a helpful justification for colonization by Europeans. The conquistador mistreatment of indigenous people in Viceroyalty of New Spain eventually prompted recriminations in both Europe and North America. The Roman Catholic Bishop of Chiapas Bartolomé de las Casas was particularly horrified by conquistador tactics as well as their failure to teach Christianity to their captives. At the Valladolid debate of 1550–1 about the enslavement of native peoples in the Spanish colonies, Bishop de las Casas argued that the pre-conquest native Americans embodied Aristotle's description of a true civil society.

=== Kingdom of France ===
In the intellectual debates of the late 16th and 17th centuries, philosophers used the racist stereotypes of the savage and the good savage as moral reproaches of the European monarchies fighting the Thirty Years' War (1618–1648) and the French Wars of Religion (1562–1598). In the essay "Of Cannibals" (1580), Michel de Montaigne reported that the Tupinambá people of Brazil ceremoniously eat the bodies of their dead enemies, as a matter of honour, whilst reminding the European reader that such wild man behavior was analogous to the religious barbarism of burning at the stake: "One calls ‘barbarism’ whatever he is not accustomed to." The academic Terence Cave further explains Montaigne's point of moral philosophy:

The cannibal practices are admitted [by Montaigne] but presented as part of a complex and balanced set of customs and beliefs which "make sense" in their own right. They are attached to a powerfully positive morality of valor and pride, one that would have been likely to appeal to early modern codes of honor, and they are contrasted with modes of behavior in the France of the wars of religion, which appear as distinctly less attractive, such as torture and barbarous methods of execution.

As philosophic reportage, "Of Cannibals" applies cultural relativism to compare the civilized European to the uncivilized noble savage. Montaigne's anthropological report about cannibalism in Brazil indicated that the Tupinambá people were neither a noble nor an exceptionally good folk, yet neither were the Tupinambá culturally or morally inferior to his contemporary, 16th-century European civilization. From the perspective of Classical liberalism of Montaigne's humanist portrayal of the customs of honor of the Tupinambá people indicates Western philosophic recognition that people are people, despite their different customs, traditions, and codes of honor. The academic David El Kenz explicates Montaigne's background concerning the violence of customary morality:

In his Essais ... Montaigne discussed the first three wars of religion (1562–63; 1567–68; 1568–70) quite specifically; he had personally participated in [the wars], on the side of the [French] royal army, in southwestern France. The [anti-Protestant] St. Bartholomew's Day massacre [1572] led him to retire to his lands in the Périgord region, and remain silent on all public affairs until the 1580s. Thus, it seems that he was traumatized by the massacre. To him, cruelty was a criterion that differentiated the Wars of Religion [1562–1598] from previous conflicts, which he idealized. Montaigne considered that three factors accounted for the shift from regular war to the carnage of civil war: popular intervention, religious demagogy, and the never-ending aspect of the conflict. ...

He chose to depict cruelty through the image of hunting, which fitted with the tradition of condemning hunting for its association with blood and death, but it was still quite surprising, to the extent that this practice was part of the aristocratic way of life. Montaigne reviled hunting by describing it as an urban massacre scene. In addition, the man–animal relationship allowed him to define virtue, which he presented as the opposite of cruelty. ... [As] a sort of natural benevolence based on ... personal feelings.

Montaigne associated the [human] propensity to cruelty toward animals, with that exercised toward men. After all, following the St. Bartholomew's Day massacre, the invented image of Charles IX shooting Huguenots from the Louvre Palace window did combine the established reputation of the King as a hunter, with a stigmatization of hunting, a cruel and perverted custom, did it not?

=== Literature ===
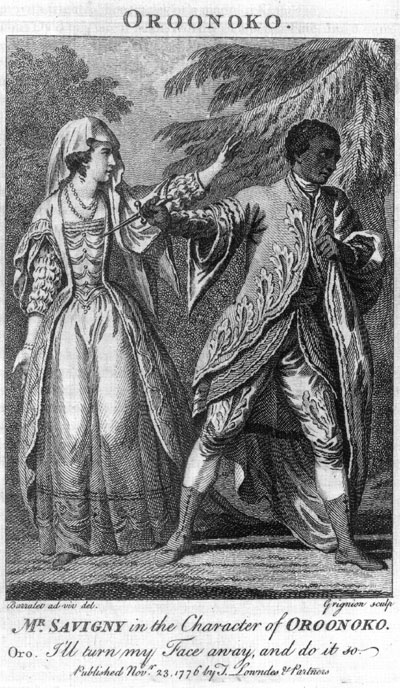
In the stageplay Oroonoko: A Tragedy (1696), by Thomas Southerne, plot complications lead the protagonist Oroonoko to kill his beloved Imoinda.

The themes about the person and persona of the mythical noble savage are the subjects of the novel Oroonoko: Or the Royal Slave (1688), by Aphra Behn, which is the tragic love story between Oroonoko and the beautiful Imoinda, an African king and queen respectively. At Coramantien, Ghana, the protagonist is deceived and delivered into the Atlantic slave trade (16th–19th centuries), and Oroonoko becomes a slave of plantation colonists in Surinam (Dutch Guiana, 1667–1954). In the course of his enslavement, Oroonoko meets the woman who narrates to the reader the life and love of Prince Oroonoko, his enslavement, his leading a slave rebellion against the Dutch planters of Surinam, and his consequent execution by the Dutch colonialists.

Despite Behn having written the popular novel for money, Oroonoko proved to be political-protest literature against slavery, because the story, plot, and characters followed the narrative conventions of the European romance novel. In the event, the Irish playwright Thomas Southerne adapted the novel Oroonoko into the stage play Oroonoko: A Tragedy (1696) that stressed the pathos of the love story, the circumstances, and the characters, which consequently gave political importance to the play and the novel for the candid cultural representation of slave-powered European colonialism.

== Uses of the stereotype ==
=== Romantic primitivism ===
The art historian Erwin Panofsky explains that:

There had been, from the beginning of Classical speculation, two contrasting opinions about the natural state of man, each of them, of course, a "Gegen-Konstruktion" to the conditions under which it was formed. One view, termed "soft" primitivism in an illuminating book by Lovejoy and Boas, conceives of primitive life as a golden age of plenty, innocence, and happiness — in other words, as civilized life purged of its vices. The other, "hard" form of primitivism conceives of primitive life as an almost subhuman existence full of terrible hardships and devoid of all comforts — in other words, as civilized life stripped of its virtues.

— Et in Arcadia Ego: Poussin and the Elegiac Tradition (1936)

In the novel The Adventures of Telemachus, Son of Ulysses (1699), in the “Encounter with the Mandurians” (Chapter IX), the theologian François Fénelon presented the noble savage stock character in conversation with civilized men from Europe about possession and ownership of Nature:

On our arrival upon this coast we found there a savage race who ... lived by hunting and by the fruits which the trees spontaneously produced. These people ... were greatly surprised and alarmed by the sight of our ships and arms and retired to the mountains. But since our soldiers were curious to see the country and hunt deer, they were met by some of these savage fugitives.

The leaders of the savages accosted them thus: “We abandoned for you, the pleasant sea-coast, so that we have nothing left, but these almost inaccessible mountains: at least, it is just that you leave us in peace and liberty. Go, and never forget that you owe your lives to our feeling of humanity. Never forget that it was from a people whom you call rude and savage that you receive this lesson in gentleness and generosity. ... We abhor that brutality which, under the gaudy names of ambition and glory, ... sheds the blood of men who are all brothers. ... We value health, frugality, liberty, and vigor of body and mind: the love of virtue, the fear of the gods, a natural goodness toward our neighbors, attachment to our friends, fidelity to all the world, moderation in prosperity, fortitude in adversity, courage always bold to speak the truth, and abhorrence of flattery. ...

If the offended gods so far blind you as to make you reject peace, you will find, when it is too late, that the people who are moderate and lovers of peace are the most formidable in war.”

— Encounter with the Mandurians, The Adventures of Telemachus, Son of Ulysses (1699)

In the Kingdom of France, critics of the Crown and Church risked censorship and summary imprisonment without trial, and primitivism was political protest against the repressive imperial règimes of Louis XIV and Louis XV. In his travelogue of North America, the writer Louis-Armand de Lom d'Arce de Lahontan, Baron de Lahontan, who had lived with the Huron Indians (Wendat people), ascribed deist and egalitarian politics to Adario, a Canadian Indian who played the role of noble savage for French explorers:

Adario sings the praises of Natural Religion. ... As against society, he puts forward a sort of primitive Communism, of which the certain fruits are Justice and a happy life. ... [The Savage] looks with compassion on poor civilized man — no courage, no strength, incapable of providing himself with food and shelter: a degenerate, a moral cretin, a figure of fun in his blue coat, his red hose, his black hat, his white plume and his green ribands. He never really lives, because he is always torturing the life out of himself to clutch at wealth and honors, which, even if he wins them, will prove to be but glittering illusions. ... For science and the arts are but the parents of corruption. The Savage obeys the will of Nature, his kindly mother, therefore he is happy. It is civilized folk who are the real barbarians.

— Paul Hazard, The European Mind

Interest in the remote peoples of the Earth, in the unfamiliar civilizations of the East, in the untutored races of America and Africa, was vivid in France in the 18th century. Everyone knows how Voltaire and Montesquieu used Hurons or Persians to hold up the [looking] glass to Western manners and morals, as Tacitus used the Germans to criticize the society of Rome. But very few ever look into the seven volumes of the Abbé Raynal's History of the Two Indies, which appeared in 1772. It is however one of the most remarkable books of the century. Its immediate practical importance lay in the array of facts which it furnished to the friends of humanity in the movement against negro slavery. But it was also an effective attack on the Church and the sacerdotal system. ... Raynal brought home to the conscience of Europeans the miseries which had befallen the natives of the New World through the Christian conquerors and their priests. He was not indeed an enthusiastic preacher of Progress. He was unable to decide between the comparative advantages of the savage state of nature and the most highly cultivated society. But he observes that "the human race is what we wish to make it", that the felicity of Man depends entirely on the improvement of legislation, and ... his view is generally optimistic.

— J.B. Bury, The Idea of Progress: an Inquiry into its Origins and Growth

=== Benjamin Franklin ===
Benjamin Franklin was critical of government indifference to the Paxton Boys massacre of the Susquehannock in Lancaster County, Pennsylvania in December 1763. Within weeks of the murders, he published A Narrative of the Late Massacres in Lancaster County, in which he referred to the Paxton Boys as "Christian white savages" and called for judicial punishment of those who carried the Bible in one hand and a hatchet in the other.

When the Paxton Boys led an armed march on Philadelphia in February 1764, with the intent of killing the Moravian Lenape and Mohican who had been given shelter there, Franklin recruited associators including Quakers to defend the city and led a delegation that met with the Paxton leaders at Germantown outside Philadelphia. The marchers dispersed after Franklin convinced them to submit their grievances in writing to the government.

In his 1784 pamphlet Remarks Concerning the Savages of North America, Franklin especially noted the racism inherent to the colonists using the word savage as a synonym for indigenous people:

"Savages" we call them, because their manners differ from ours, which we think the perfection of civility; they think the same of theirs.

Franklin praised the way of life of indigenous people, their customs of hospitality, their councils of government, and acknowledged that while some Europeans had foregone civilization to live like a "savage", the opposite rarely occurred, because few indigenous people chose "civilization" over "savagery".

=== Jean-Jacques Rousseau ===
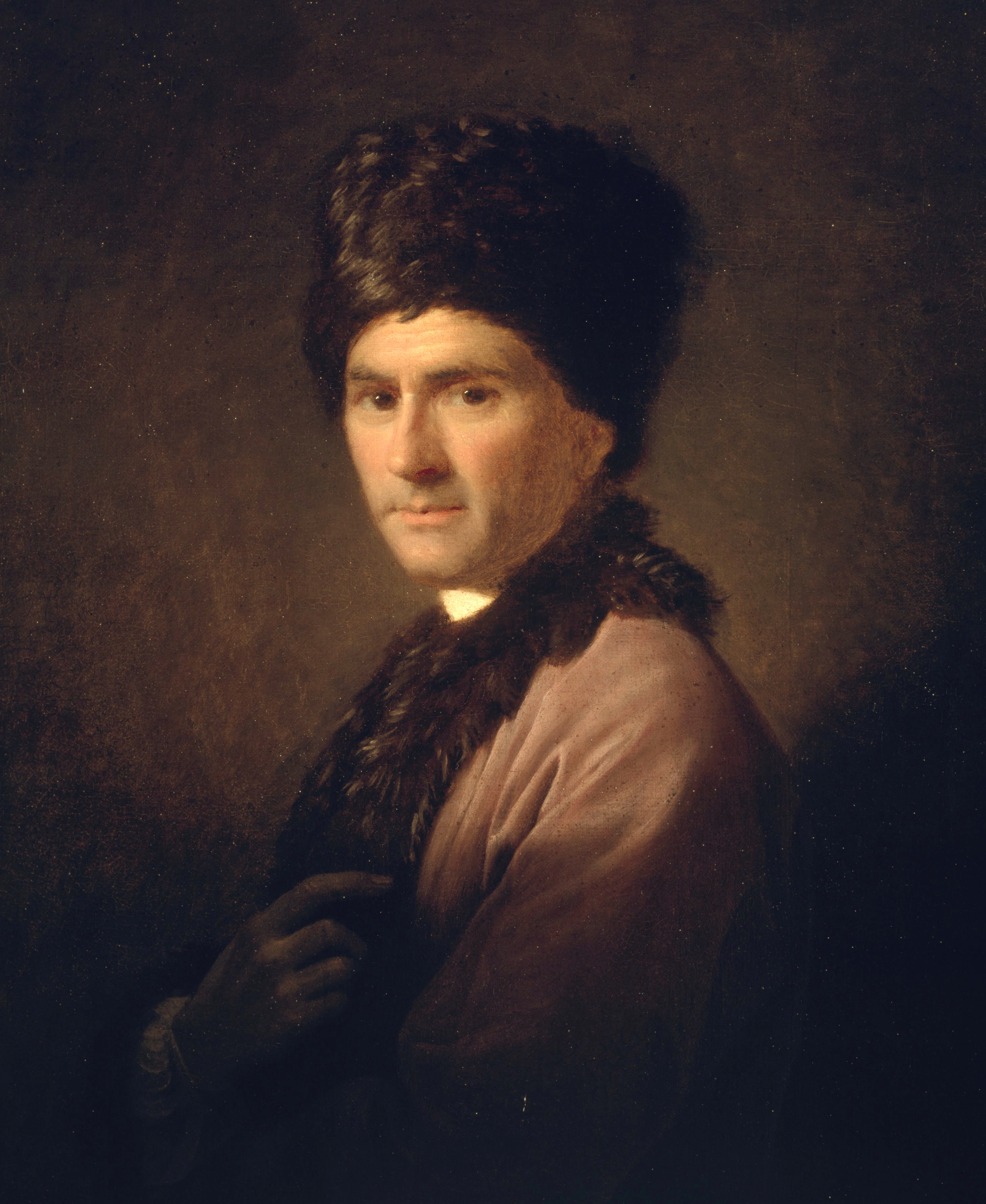
Jean-Jacques Rousseau (1712–1778) by Allan Ramsay (1766)

The term "noble savage" never appears in Jean-Jacques Rousseau's writing. Ideologues accused Rousseau of unleashing the force of savagery in his role as a philosophe of the Jacobin radicals of the French Revolution (1789–1799). The linkage of Rousseau and the noble savage is one of the most persistent errors in historiography.

In Discourse on the Origins of Inequality Among Men (1754), Rousseau argued in the state of nature man was pleasant and non-moral but with an "innate repugnance to see others of his kind suffer". He felt the rise of humanity began a "formidable struggle for existence" between the species man and the other animal species of Nature. This struggle shaped a human intelligence capable of "almost unlimited development".

Having invented tools, discovered fire, and transcended the state of nature, Rousseau said that "it is easy to see. . . . that all our labors are directed upon two objects only, namely, for oneself, the commodities of life, and consideration on the part of others"; thus amour propre (self-regard) is a "factitious feeling arising, only in society, which leads a man to think more highly of himself than of any other." Therefore, "it is this desire for reputation, honors, and preferment which devours us all . . . this rage to be distinguished, that we own what is best and worst in men — our virtues and our vices, our sciences and our errors, our conquerors and our philosophers — in short, a vast number of evil things and a small number of good [things]"; that is the aspect of character "which inspires men to all the evils which they inflict upon one another."

Men become men only in a civil society based upon law, and only a reformed system of education can make men good; the academic Lovejoy explains that:

For Rousseau, man's good lay in departing from his "natural" state — but not too much; "perfectability", up to a certain point, was desirable, though beyond that point an evil. Not its infancy but its jeunesse [youth] was the best age of the human race. The distinction may seem to us slight enough; but in the mid-eighteenth century it amounted to an abandonment of the stronghold of the primitivistic position. Nor was this the whole of the difference. As compared with the then-conventional pictures of the savage state, Rousseau's account, even of this third stage, is far less idyllic; and it is so because of his fundamentally unfavorable view of human nature quâ human. ... [Rousseau's] savages are quite unlike Dryden's Indians: "Guiltless men, that danced away their time, / Fresh as the groves and happy as their clime" or Mrs. Aphra Behn's natives of Surinam, who represented an absolute idea of the first state of innocence "before men knew how to sin." The men in Rousseau's "nascent society" already had 'bien des querelles et des combats" [many quarrels and fights]; l'amour propre was already manifest in them ... and slights or affronts were consequently visited with vengeances terribles.

Rousseau proposes reorganizing society with a social contract that will "draw from the very evil from which we suffer the remedy which shall cure it"; Lovejoy notes that in the Discourse on the Origins of Inequality, Rousseau:

...declares that there is a dual process going on through history; on the one hand, an indefinite progress in all those powers and achievements which express merely the potency of man's intellect; on the other hand, an increasing estrangement of men from one another, an intensification of ill-will and mutual fear, culminating in a monstrous epoch of universal conflict and mutual destruction. And the chief cause of the latter process Rousseau, following Hobbes and [Bernard] Mandeville, found, as we have seen, in that unique passion of the self-conscious animal — pride, self esteem, le besoin de se mettre au dessus des autres [the need to put oneself above others]. A large survey of history does not belie these generalizations, and the history of the period since Rousseau wrote lends them a melancholy verisimilitude. Precisely the two processes, which he described have ... been going on upon a scale beyond all precedent: immense progress in man's knowledge and in his powers over nature, and, at the same time, a steady increase of rivalries, distrust, hatred and, at last, "the most horrible state of war" ... [Moreover, Rousseau] failed to realize fully how strongly amour propre tended to assume a collective form ... in pride of race, of nationality, of class.

=== Charles Dickens ===
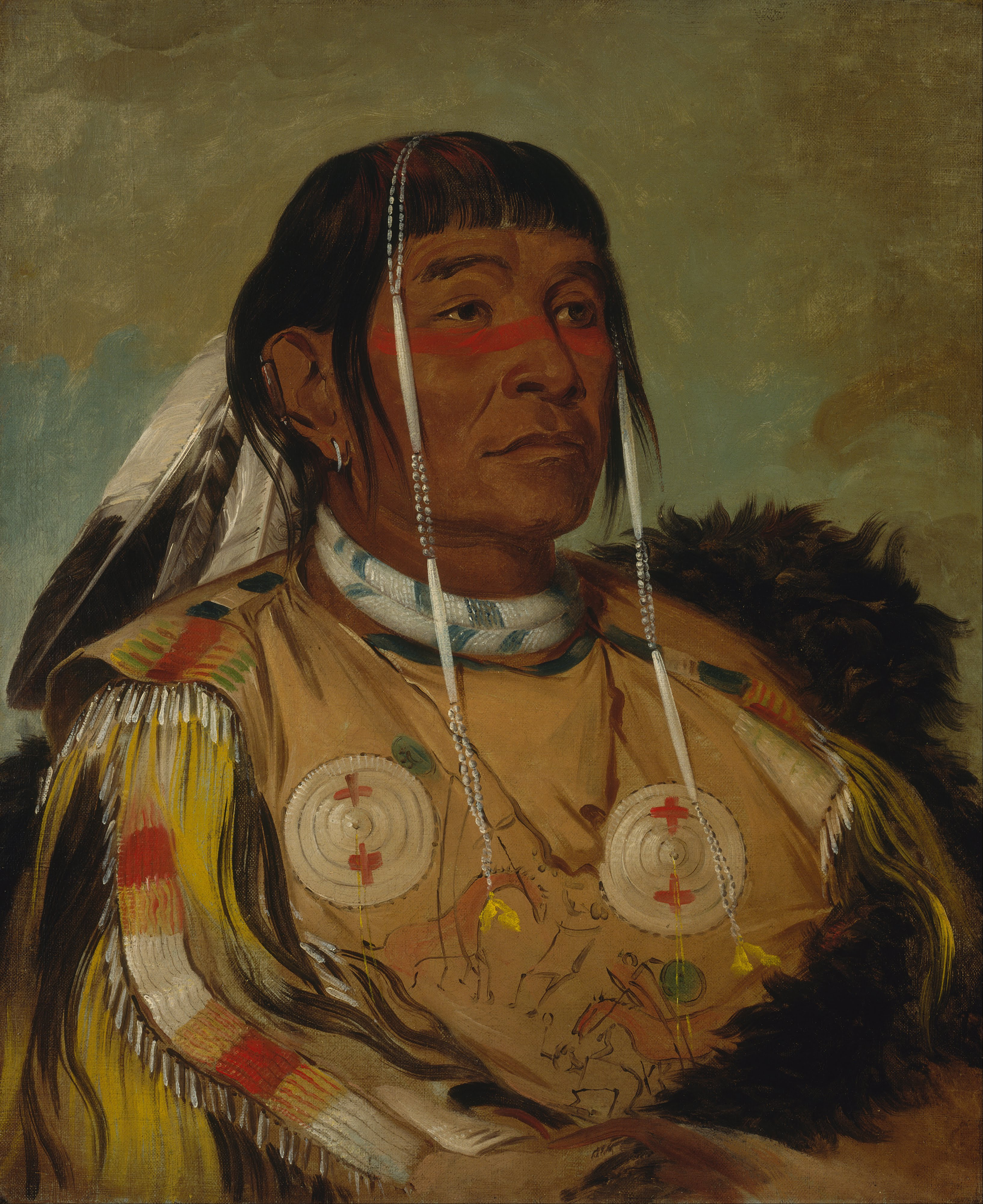
The Noble Savage as stereotype: Sha-có-pay, Chief of the Ojibwa Indians of the Great Plains. (George Catlin, 1832)

In 1839, George Catlin toured Europe with his Indian Gallery which included his oil paintings of North American natives. When poet and critic Charles Baudelaire viewed it in Paris, he praised Caitlin as "our guide among the savages" who "brought back alive the proud and free characters of these chiefs; both their nobility and manliness."

In 1853, Charles Dickens panned the exhibit in an essay titled "The Noble Savage" which ran on the front page of his weekly magazine Household Words. Dickens expressed his repugnance at American Indian culture, depicting them as dirty, cruel, and quarrelsome.

Dickens begins by dismissing the concept as a myth, "...I beg to say that I have not the least belief in the Noble Savage. I consider him a prodigious nuisance and an enormous superstition." He describes men whose lives are "passed chin deep in a lake of blood" due to incessant wars. Dickens cautions against a romanticized persona, "if we have anything to learn from the Noble Savage it is what to avoid. His virtues are a fable; his happiness is a delusion; his nobility, nonsense...the world will be all the better when this place knows him no more.

The cruel tone of the essay may have been satirical, but it reflected the abolitionist Dickens' increasingly racist views.

=== Theories of racialism ===
In the 1860s, physician John Crawfurd and anthropologist James Hunt used the noble savage in their scientific racism project. As polygenists, Crawfurd and Hunt believed each race is a distinct human species and labeled critics of their argument as proponents of "Rousseau's Noble Savage". Later in his career, Crawfurd re-introduced the noble savage term to modern anthropology and deliberately ascribed coinage of the term to Jean-Jacques Rousseau.

=== Ecological Noble Savage ===
A common view among Westerners was that prehistoric Indigenous cultures universally lived in perfect harmony with nature and endeavored to conserve and protect the environment. As early as the 1700s, Europeans were under the mistaken belief that Indigenous peoples (particularly in the New World) had not significantly altered their environment. This notion is referred to as the "myth of the ecological noble savage". (Note: The term "ecological Indian" is also used, in a North American context, for the notion of ecological noble savage.) This myth is a recent variant of the noble savage cultural stereotype, which originated several hundred years ago in the Western imagination. (Note: The phrase "ecologically noble savage" was first used to describe the myth in 1990.) During the environmental movement of the 1970s, the myth of the ecological noble savage became widespread. (Note: The myth of the ecologically noble savage is often applied in the context of North America, but is also applied in Asia, South America, Australia, and other places in the world.) The consensus of academics is that the concept of the ecological noble savage was essentially false, and that prehistoric peoples impacted their habitat in virtually all places they inhabited, resulting in significant, permanent changes to the ecosystem, including – in some cases – extinction of species and deforestation.

When considering the impacts of Indigenous cultures on the environment, some scholars distinguish cultures that are ecologists from cultures that are conservationists. The anthropologist Shepard Krech, in his work The Ecological Indian, analyzed the Indigenous peoples of North America and concluded that they (prior to the 20th century) were ecologists because they were deeply aware of the interrelationships between humans, animals, and nature; but they were not not conservationists because they did not avoid waste and did not preserve resources for future availability. (Note: According to the anthropologist Peter Stahl, some Native American cultures may have displayed an conservation ethic, but many did not.)

== Modern perspectives ==
=== Supporters of primitivism ===
In "The Prehistory of Warfare: Misled by Ethnography" (2006), the researchers Jonathan Haas and Matthew Piscitelli challenged the idea that the human species is innately disposed towards being aggressive or is inclined to engage in violent conflict and propose rather that warfare is an occasional activity by a society and is not an inherent part of human culture. Moreover, the UNESCO's Seville Statement on Violence (1986) specifically rejects claims that the human propensity towards violence has a genetic basis.

Anarcho-primitivists, such as the philosopher John Zerzan, rely upon a strong ethical dualism between Anarcho-primitivism and civilization; hence, "life before domestication [and] agriculture was, in fact, largely one of leisure, intimacy with nature, sensual wisdom, sexual equality, and health." Zerzan's claims about the moral superiority of primitive societies are based on a certain reading of the works of anthropologists, such as Marshall Sahlins and Richard Borshay Lee, wherein the anthropologic category of primitive society is restricted to hunter-gatherer societies who have no domesticated animals or agriculture, e.g. the stable social hierarchy of the American Indians of the north-west North America, who live from fishing and foraging, is attributed to having domesticated dogs and the cultivation of tobacco, that animal husbandry and agriculture equal civilization.

In anthropology, the argument has been made that key tenets of the myth of the noble savage idea inform cultural investments in places seemingly removed from the Tropics, such as the Mediterranean and specifically Greece, during the debt crisis by European institutions (such as documenta) and by various commentators who found Greece to be a positive inspiration for resistance to austerity policies and the neoliberalism of the EU These commentators' positive embrace of the periphery (their mythical noble savage ideal) is the other side of the mainstream views, also dominant during that period, that stereotyped Greece and the South as lazy and corrupt.

=== Opponents of primitivism ===
In War Before Civilization: the Myth of the Peaceful Savage (1996), the archaeologist Lawrence H. Keeley said that the "widespread myth" that "civilized humans have fallen from grace from a simple, primeval happiness, a peaceful golden age" is contradicted and refuted by archeologic evidence that indicates that violence was common practice in early human societies. That the noble savage paradigm has warped anthropological literature to political ends. Moreover, the anthropologist Roger Sandall likewise accused anthropologists of exalting the mythical noble savage above civilized man, by way of designer tribalism, a form of romanticised primitivism that dehumanises Indigenous peoples into the cultural stereotype of the indigène peoples who live a primitive way of life demarcated and limited by tradition, which discouraged Indigenous peoples from cultural assimilation into the dominant Western culture.

In the 2003 book, Constant Battles: Why we fight written by Steven LeBlanc, a professor of archaeology at Harvard University who specializes in the American Southwest, LeBlanc further documents the mythical notion of primitive non-violence against foreign tribal peoples, internal strife and internecine violence, as well as violence against animals and wildlife. In many of these instances the homicide rate even rose to substantially higher levels than any seen in modernity on a proportionate basis.

== See also ==
- Exoticism
- Native Americans in German popular culture
- Native American hobbyism in Germany
- Neotribalism
- Stereotypes about indigenous peoples of North America
- Racism in the work of Charles Dickens
- Virtuous pagan

Concepts:

- Alterity
- Cultural relativism
- State of nature
- Xenocentrism

Cultural examples:

- The Blue Lagoon (novel)
- Brave New World
- A High Wind in Jamaica (novel)
- Legend of the Rainbow Warriors
- Lord of the Flies
- Magical Negro
- Plastic shaman
