= Eliza Davis (letter writer) =

Jewish English letter writer (1817–1903)

Eliza Davis (1817–1903) was a Jewish English woman who is remembered for her correspondence with the novelist Charles Dickens about his depiction of Jewish characters in his novels.

Davis was born in Jamaica. In 1835 she married her cousin James Phineas Davis (1812–1886), a banker, who, in 1860, bought Tavistock House in London from Dickens.

Dickens' novel Oliver Twist refers to one of its characters, Fagin, 274 times in the first 38 chapters as "the Jew", while the ethnicity or religion of the other characters is rarely mentioned. In 1854, The Jewish Chronicle asked why "Jews alone should be excluded from the 'sympathizing heart' of this great author and powerful friend of the oppressed." Dickens (who had extensive knowledge of London street life and child exploitation) explained that he had made Fagin Jewish because "it unfortunately was true, of the time to which the story refers, that that class of criminal almost invariably was a Jew." Dickens commented that by calling Fagin a Jew he had meant no imputation against the Jewish faith, saying in a letter, "I have no feeling towards the Jews but a friendly one. I always speak well of them, whether in public or private, and bear my testimony (as I ought to do) to their perfect good faith in such transactions as I have ever had with them."

Eliza Davis, whose husband had purchased the lease on Dickens's home in 1860 when he had put it up for sale, wrote to Dickens in 1863, protesting at his portrayal of Fagin, arguing that he had "encouraged a vile prejudice against the despised Hebrew", and that he had done a great wrong to the Jewish people. While Dickens first reacted defensively upon receiving Davis's letter, he then halted the printing of Oliver Twist, and changed the text for the parts of the book that had not been set, which explains why after the first 38 chapters Fagin is barely called "the Jew" at all in the next 179 references to him.

== Death and legacy ==
Davis died in 1903 and is buried at Willesden Jewish Cemetery. Her correspondence with Dickens was published in 1915. Further correspondence by Davis, with the novelist and historian Walter Besant, the painter Lawrence Alma-Tadema, and Sir Henry Ponsonby, Private Secretary to Queen Victoria, is held in the University of Southampton archives.
