= Charley Bates =

Character from Charles Dickens Oliver Twist

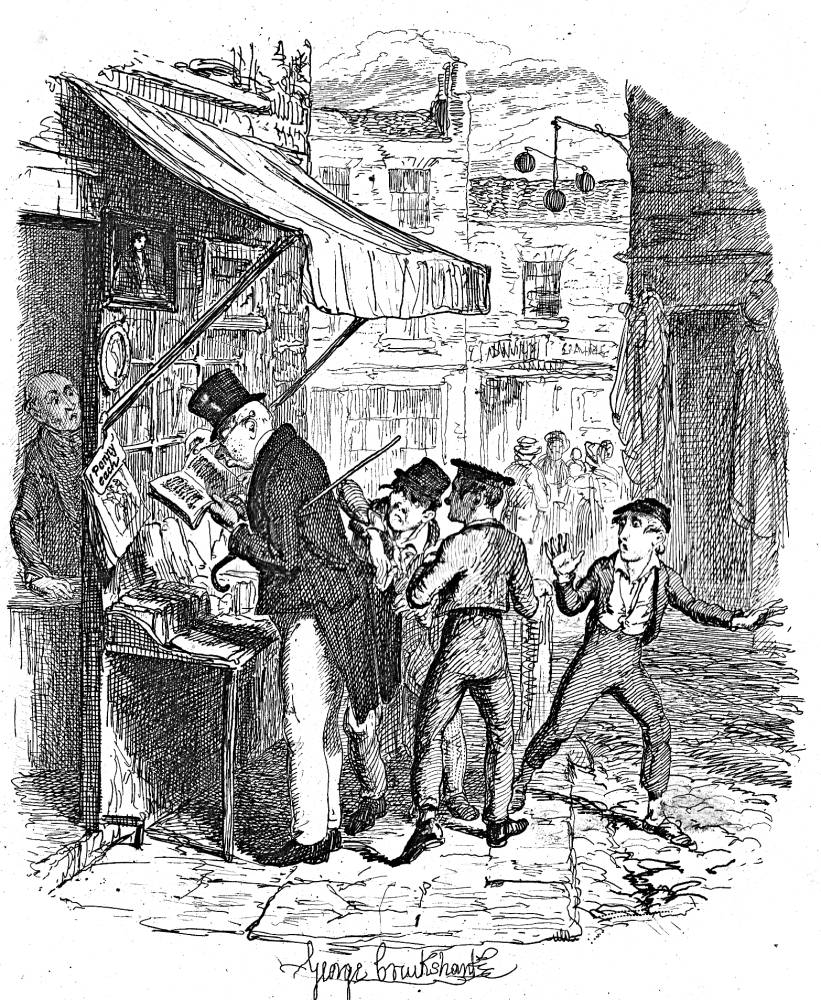
- Charley (centre) and the Dodger steal Mr Brownlow's handkerchief at the bookstall. Illustration by George Cruikshank.
- Created by: Charles Dickens

In-universe information
- Gender: Male
- Occupation: Criminal (formerly); Farmhand (ending)

Charles "Charley" Bates is a supporting character in the Charles Dickens's 1838 novel Oliver Twist. He is a young boy and a member of Fagin's gang of pickpockets. Bates acts as the best friend to the Artful Dodger, whose skills he admires unreservedly. Bill Sikes's murder of Nancy shocks him so much that at the end of the novel he leaves London to become an agricultural labourer.

== In the novel ==
Charley, along with the Artful Dodger, steals Mr Brownlow's handkerchief, a crime that Oliver is blamed for. Later in the novel, Bates delivers the bad news to Fagin that when the Artful Dodger was arrested for stealing a silver snuff box, he was positively identified by the owner, such that it is a sure bet he will be convicted in court. Charley believes that it is too bad he did not go out in a blaze of glory by stealing something of great value instead of a "common twopenny-halfpenny" snuffbox. Fagin tells him that the Dodger's glory will be in the memory of his comrades: "wasn't he always top-sawyer among you all?". But Charley is distressed that the Dodger's greatness will not be preserved for posterity in the official record,

"'cause it can't come out in the 'dictment; 'cause nobody will ever know half of what he was. How will he stand in the Newgate Calendar? P'raps not be there at all. Oh, my eye, my eye, wot a blow it is!'"

At the end of the novel, Charley is horrified by Bill Sikes's violent murder of Nancy. When Sikes approaches him, he starts yelling, revealing Sikes's location to the mob that wants to lynch him. He is the only member of Fagin's gang to reform. In the final chapter Dickens states that Charley left London to work as a farm hand, later becoming a cattle rancher: "Master Charles Bates, appalled by Sikes's crime, fell into a train of reflection whether an honest life was not, after all, the best. Arriving at the conclusion that it certainly was, he turned his back upon the scenes of the past, resolved to amend it in some new sphere of action. He struggled hard and suffered much, for some time; but, having a contented disposition, and a good purpose, succeeded in the end; and, from being a farmer's drudge, and a carrier's lad, he is now the merriest young grazier in all Northamptonshire."

== Media ==
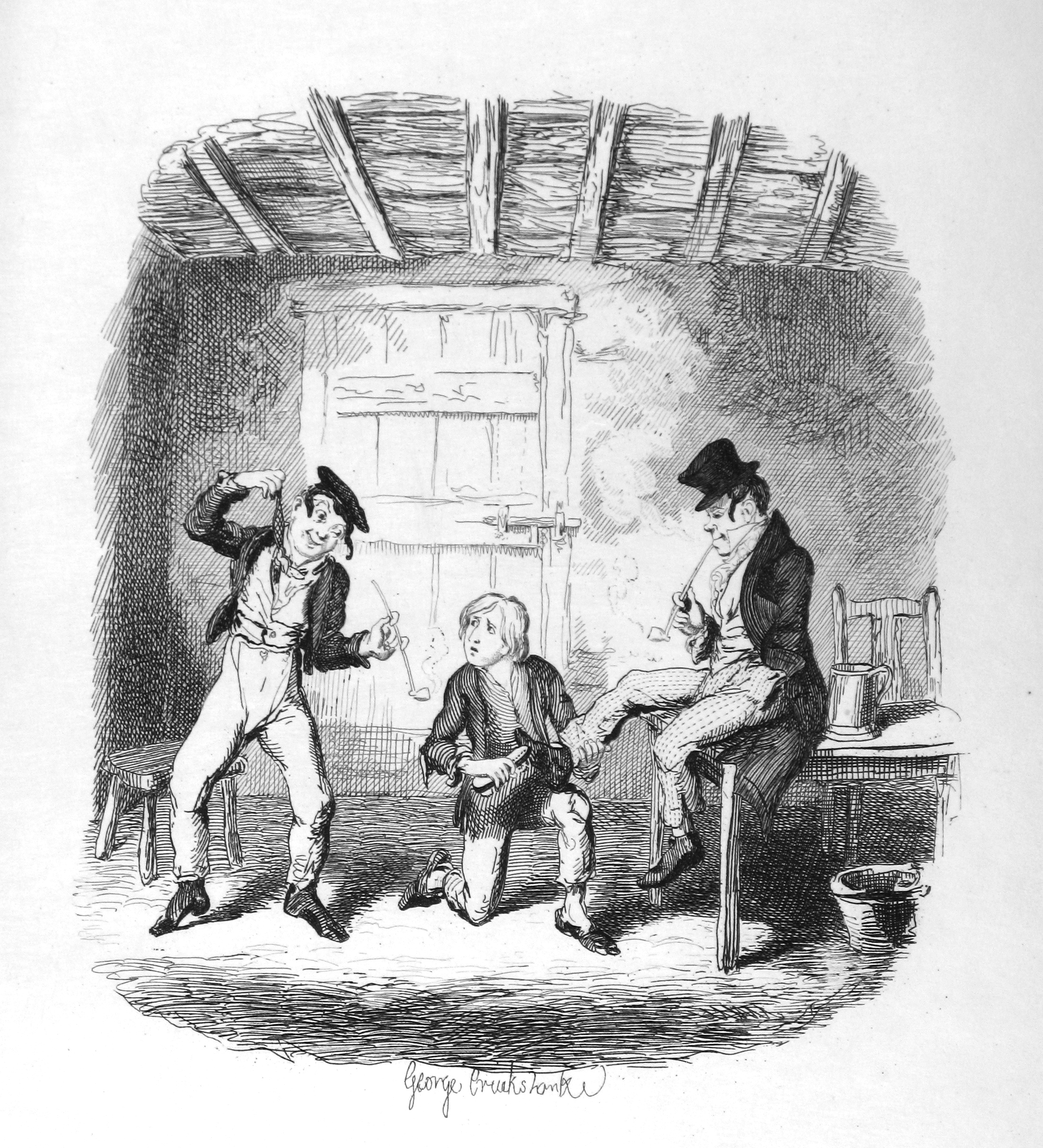
illustration captioned: "Master Bates explains a professional technicality"

The character of Charley Bates has a much smaller role in the musical Oliver!, and is eliminated entirely from some other adaptations, including the 1997 adaptation and the 2007 miniseries. One adaptation in which his role is almost as significant as in the novel is Roman Polanski's 2005 adaptation. His role is also fairly prominent in the 1948 David Lean film. Tito the chihuahua in Disney's 1988 animated film Oliver and Company is entirely based on Charley. In the children's television prequel Dodger, Charley (Aabay Ali) is a girl who follows Dodger to London from the north of England and joins Fagin's gang with him.

== Critical commentary ==
Charley is regularly referred to as "Master Bates". Whether this is an intentional pun on "masturbates" is disputed. The word existed at the time, derived from the Latin verb masturbari, but it was relatively obscure, and it is not recorded as a verb until 1857, 19 years after the novel was published. Edward Le Comte considered it to be a Freudian slip. John Sutherland considered it to be too puerile, a "schoolboy joke", to be intentional, since Dickens's use of names is generally much more sophisticated.

Like Nancy, Charley represents the idea that redemption is possible for even the most degraded characters. Lord Acton considered the portrayal of Charley and Nancy to indicate that Oliver Twist was a much more profound work than Dickens's earlier novel The Pickwick Papers. He wrote that "Nancy's refusal to be delivered from Sikes after her love for the child had brought her a chance of redemption and Charley Bates turning against the murderer are surely in a higher style than anything in Pickwick". It was Dickens's friend John Forster who persuaded him to show Charley finally escaping a life of crime.
