= Of Cannibals =

Essay by Michel de Montaigne

Of Cannibals (Des Cannibales), written circa 1580, is an essay, one of those in the collection Essays, by Michel de Montaigne, describing the ceremonies of the Tupinambá people in Brazil. In particular, he reported about how the group ceremoniously ate the bodies of their dead enemies as a matter of honor. In his work, he uses cultural relativism and compares the cannibalism to the "barbarianism" of 16th-century Europe.

An English translation, Of the Caniballes, appeared in John Florio's 1603 translation of the Essais. This has often been viewed (first by Edward Capell in 1781) as an influence on Shakespeare's The Tempest, in particular Act II, Scene 1.
