= Fagin =

Fictional character in Oliver Twist

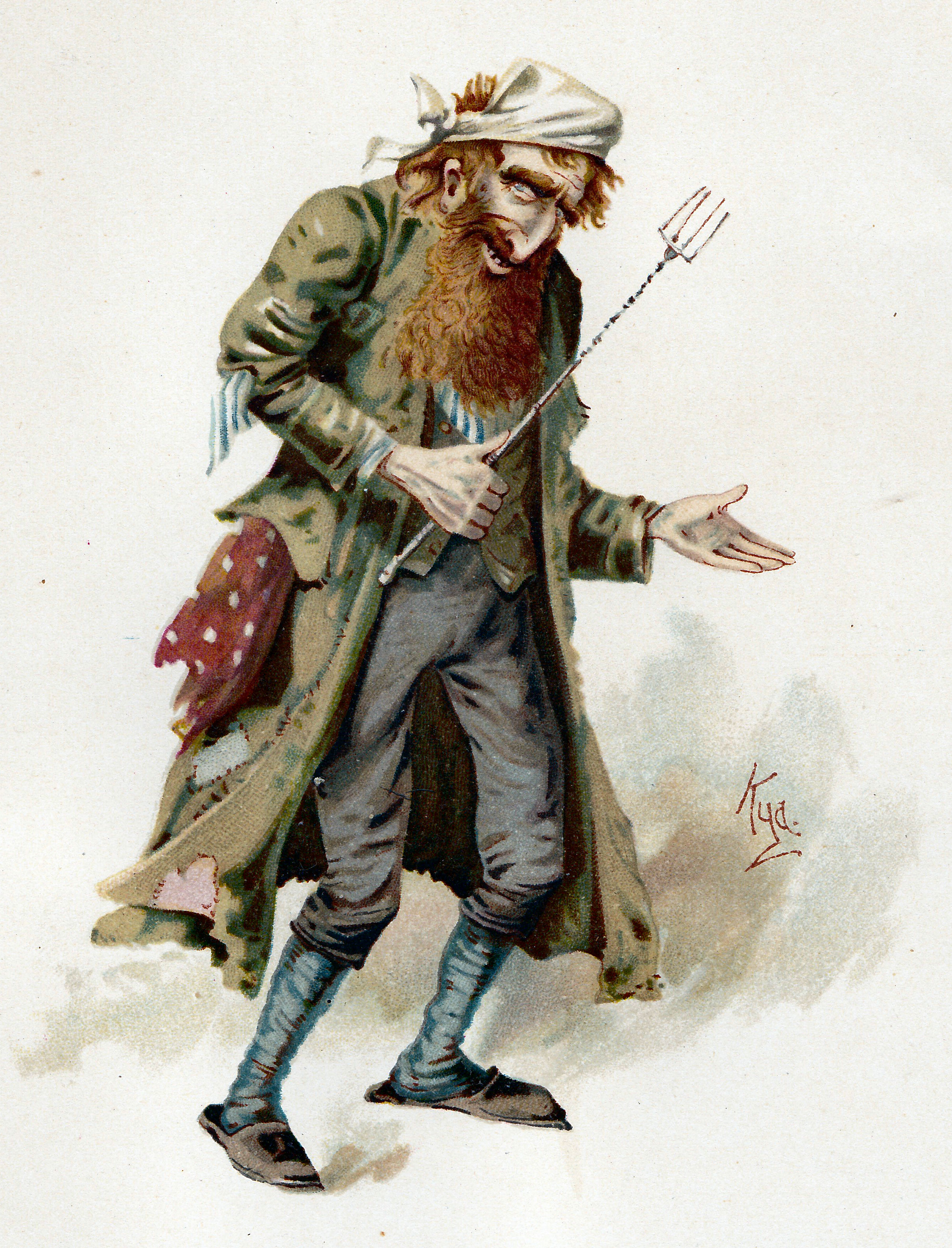
- Fagin in a watercolour by 'Kyd' (1889)
- Created by: Charles Dickens
- Based on: Bob Fagin, Ikey Solomon

In-universe information
- Nicknames: The Old Man; The Jew; The Old One
- Gender: Male
- Occupation: Offender; Criminal; Pickpocket; Procurer
- Religion: Jew
- Nationality: English

Fagin (/ˈfeɪɡɪn/) is a fictional character and the secondary antagonist in Charles Dickens's 1838 novel Oliver Twist. In the story, Fagin is the leader of a group of children (the Artful Dodger and Charley Bates among them) whom he teaches to make their livings by pickpocketing and other criminal activities, in exchange for shelter. A distinguishing trait is his constant and insincere use of the phrase "my dear" when addressing others. At the time of the novel, he is said by another character, Monks, to have already made criminals out of "scores" of children. Nancy, who is the lover of Bill Sikes (the novel's lead villain), is confirmed to be Fagin's former pupil. Originally depicted by Dickens as explicitly Jewish, Fagin is described in the novel’s preface as a "crafty old Jew" and a fence though Dickens downplayed the character’s Jewish background in later editions.

Fagin is a confessed miser who, despite the wealth that he has acquired, does very little to improve the squalid lives of the children he guards, or his own. In the second chapter of his appearance, it is shown (when talking to himself) that he cares less for their welfare, than that they do not "peach" (inform) on him and the other children. Still darker sides to the character's nature are shown when he beats the Artful Dodger for not bringing Oliver back, in his attempted beating of Oliver for trying to escape, and in his own involvement with various plots and schemes throughout the story. He indirectly but intentionally causes the death of Nancy by falsely informing Sikes that she had betrayed him, when in reality she had shielded Sikes from the law, whereupon Sikes kills her. Near the end of the book, Fagin is captured and sentenced to be hanged, in a chapter which portrays him as pitiable in his anguish. Though portrayed as cunning and manipulative, Fagin's characterization has been the subject of longstanding criticism for its antisemitic overtones.

In the first 38 chapters of the original edition of the novel, Fagin is referred to as "the Jew" over 250 times, while being called by his name far less frequently. Dickens notoriously stated that he chose to depict Fagin as Jewish by claiming "the class of criminal almost invariably was a Jew" in the era the novel was set. The novelist later removed many references to Fagin's Jewishness in revised editions of the novel, particularly after being contacted in 1863 by Eliza Davis, the wife of a Jewish banker to whom Dickens had sold his home, though the explicit framing of Fagin as a Jew continued to persist in many unauthorized publications of the novel's original edition.

Fagin has since become a prominent example in literary and cultural studies of the antisemitic stereotype of the "Jewish villain" and as "one of the most infamous antisemitic caricatures of all time." In response to this legacy, creators such as Will Eisner have reinterpreted the character from more sympathetic or critical perspectives, as in Eisner's 2003 graphic novel Fagin the Jew.

== Role in the novel ==
Fagin is portrayed as a criminal mastermind who kidnaps orphaned children and trains them to be pickpockets in return for sheltering and feeding them; he keeps the ill-gotten money for himself. His "wards" include the novel's title character Oliver Twist, the Artful Dodger, Charley Bates, and Nancy. He also trained the novel's main antagonist, housebreaker Bill Sikes, who later became his main source of stolen goods.

Oliver at first believes that Fagin is an artisan who makes wallets and handkerchiefs which are, in fact, stolen at Fagin's order, and goes along with his new teacher's orders. The only one in the gang to protect Oliver is Nancy, who is also Sikes's lover.

After Oliver is arrested for supposedly picking the pocket of a gentleman named Mr. Brownlow (an act actually committed by the Artful Dodger and Charley Bates), Brownlow takes pity on Oliver and brings him to his house, helping him recover from the abuse and malnourishment he has suffered. Fagin and Sikes, fearing that Oliver will betray him to the police, force Nancy to help Sikes kidnap the boy again. Oliver tries to run away, but Sikes almost beats him into submission, stopping only when Nancy begs him to show mercy while the cowardly Fagin tries to smooth matters over between the two.

Fagin forces Oliver to help Sikes burgle a house owned by the wealthy, elderly widow Mrs. Maylie. After breaking into the house, Oliver is shot in the arm and Sikes abandons him while he makes his own escape. Mrs. Maylie and her niece Rose take Oliver in and raise him in a polite society. Fagin later meets with a fellow criminal, the mysterious Mr. Monks, and plots with him to destroy Oliver's newfound reputation.

To make sure Oliver never learns of his true parentage, Fagin and Monks conspire to buy a locket and a ring left to the boy by his late mother from Mr. Bumble and his wife, the former Mrs. Corney, and Monks throws them in the river. Nancy, ashamed of her role in Oliver's kidnapping, tells Mr. Brownlow and Rose that Oliver is in danger, and secretly joins them in a plan to rescue him. Fagin becomes suspicious of Nancy and has Noah Claypole, who has recently joined his gang, follow her to one of her meetings with Brownlow and Rose. Upon learning what Nancy is up to, Fagin lies to Sikes that she intends to turn him over to the police, provoking Sikes to kill her.

Fagin and Monks attempt to flee London, but both are arrested. Monks, after being forced to confess his part, is given a second chance thanks to Mr. Brownlow and Oliver, but Fagin is sentenced to be hanged for his crimes. The night before Fagin's execution, Oliver visits him in prison, and Fagin rages against the entire world for the sorry end he has come to. The following day, he is hanged.

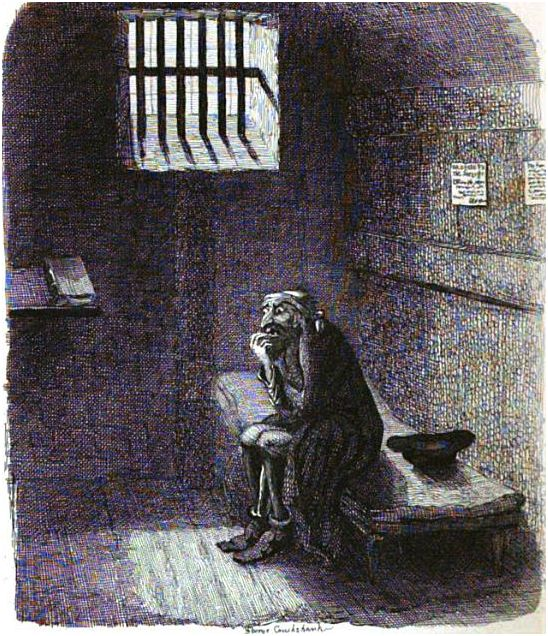
Fagin waits to be hanged

== Historical basis ==
Fagin's name comes from one of Dickens' friends he had known in his youth while working in a boot-blacking factory.

Fagin's character might be based on the criminal Ikey Solomon, who was a fence at the centre of a highly publicised arrest, escape, recapture, and trial. Some accounts of Solomon also describe him as a London underworld "kidsman" (a kidsman was an adult who recruited children and trained them as pickpockets, exchanging food and shelter for goods the children stole). The popularity of Dickens's novel caused "fagin" to replace "kidsman" in some crime circles, denoting an adult who teaches minors to steal and keeps a major portion of the loot.

Other sources, such as Howard Mancing in The Cervantes Encyclopedia, claim that Fagin is assumed to be modelled on Monipodio, one of the main characters in Miguel de Cervantes' Rinconete y Cortadillo (1613). Monipodio is the leader of a criminal gang in 17th-century Seville that includes cutpurses and cape stealers.

== Allegations of antisemitism ==
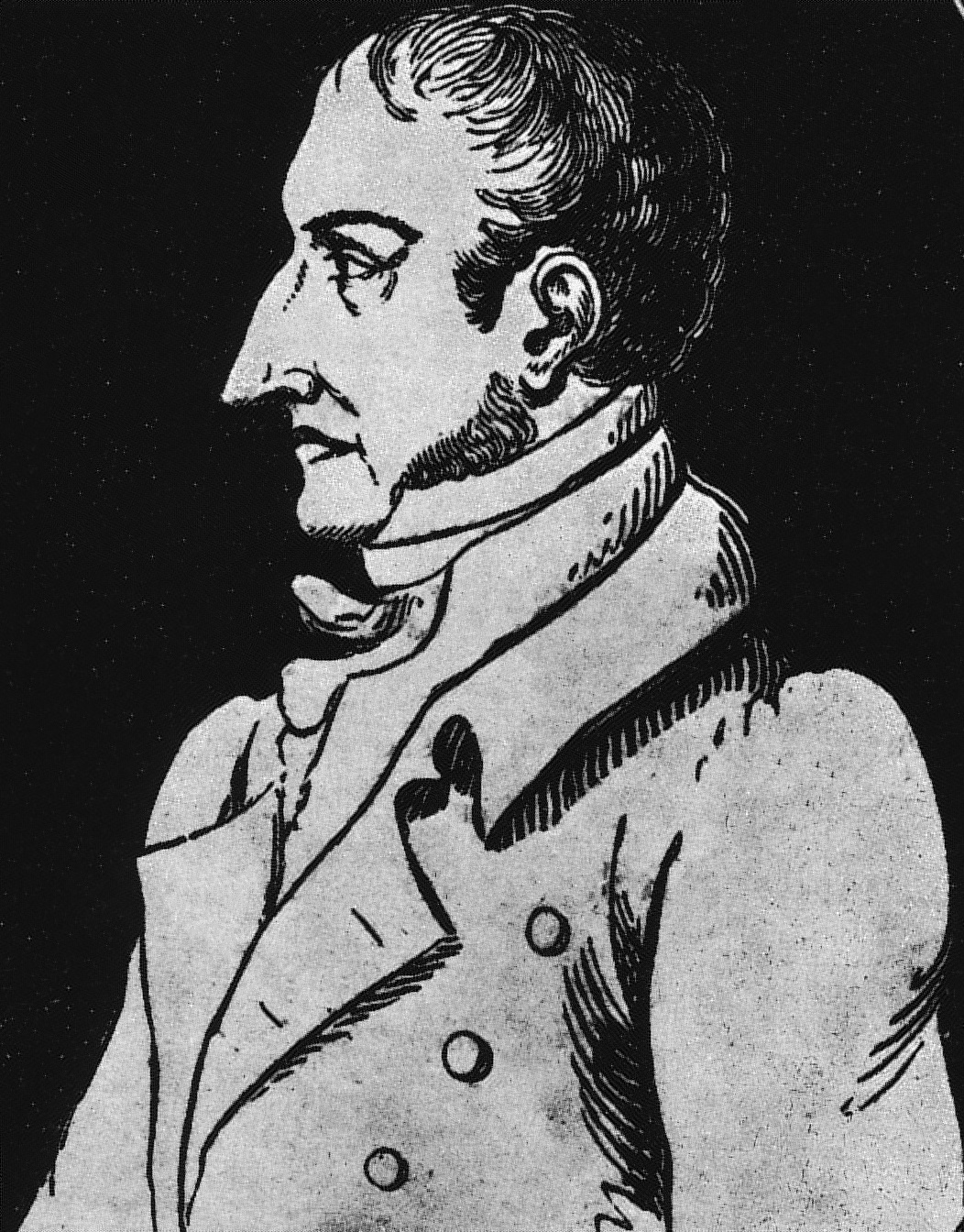
Fence Ikey Solomon, on whom Fagin has often been said to be based

Fagin has been the subject of much debate over antisemitism. The first 38 chapters of the book refer to Fagin by his racial and religious origin 257 times, calling him "the Jew", against 42 uses of "Fagin" or "the old man". Dickens wrote that he had made Fagin Jewish because "it unfortunately was true, of the time to which the story refers, that the class of criminal almost invariably was a Jew". It is often argued that Fagin was based on a specific Jewish criminal of the era, Ikey Solomon. Dickens also claimed that by calling Fagin "the Jew" he had meant no imputation against the Jewish people: "I have no feeling towards the Jews but a friendly one. I always speak well of them, whether in public or private, and bear my testimony (as I ought to do) to their perfect good faith in such transactions as I have ever had with them..."

Dickens sold his London home in 1860 to a Jewish banker, James Davis, who objected to the emphasis on Fagin's Jewishness in the novel. When he sold the house, Dickens allegedly told a friend: "The purchaser of Tavistock House will be a Jew Money-Lender." Dickens became friends with Davis's wife, Eliza, who told him in a letter in 1863 that Jews regarded his portrayal of Fagin a "great wrong" to their people. Dickens then started to revise Oliver Twist, removing all mention of "the Jew" from the last 15 chapters; he later wrote in reply: "There is nothing but good will left between me and a People for whom I have a real regard and to whom I would not willfully have given an offence". In one of his final public readings in 1869, a year before his death, Dickens cleansed Fagin of all stereotypical caricature. A contemporary report observed: "There is no nasal intonation; a bent back but no shoulder-shrug: the conventional attributes are omitted." In later editions of the book, printed during his lifetime, Dickens himself excised over 180 instances of 'Jew' from the text.

In an introduction to a 1981 reissue of Oliver Twist, Irving Howe wrote that Fagin was considered an "archetypical Jewish villain". Comic book creator Will Eisner, disturbed by the antisemitism in the typical depiction of the character, created a graphic novel in 2003 titled Fagin the Jew. In this book, the backstory of the character and events of Oliver Twist are depicted from his point of view.

== Media portrayals ==
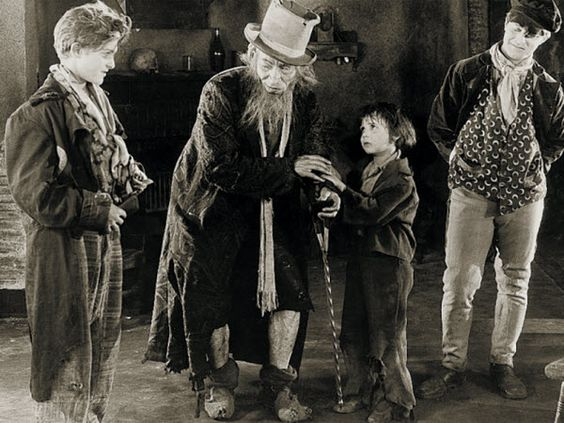
Oliver Twist (Jackie Coogan) held captive, by Fagin (Lon Chaney) and his criminal gang in Oliver Twist (1922 film)

Numerous prominent actors have played the character of Fagin. Lon Chaney portrayed Fagin in a silent film version Oliver Twist. Alec Guinness portrayed Fagin in David Lean's 1948 film adaptation of Oliver Twist, with controversial make-up by Stuart Freeborn which exaggerated stereotypical Jewish facial features. The release of the film in the USA was delayed for three years on charges of being antisemitic by the Anti-Defamation League of B'nai B'rith and the New York Board of Rabbis. It was finally released in the United States in 1951, with seven minutes of profile shots and other parts of Guinness' performance cut.

For the BBC's at the time controversial 1962 serial, Fagin was portrayed in a fashion very faithful to the novel by Irish actor Max Adrian.

Ron Moody's portrayal in the original London production of the musical Oliver! by Lionel Bart, which he repeated in the Oscar-winning 1968 film, is recognisably influenced by Guinness's portrayal. However, the antisemitic quality of Guinness' portrayal was considerably toned down in the musical, partly because of Moody being Jewish himself; he was in fact the first Jewish actor to portray Fagin on film since Irving Pichel. While Fagin remains an unrepentant thief, he is a much more sympathetic and comic character than he is in the novel. His plot with Monks is deleted and his role in Nancy's death is similarly excised, and he is portrayed as being cowardly and afraid of Bill Sikes. Fagin is completely innocent of Nancy's murder and is horrified when he finds out. He even admonishes Sikes saying that: "[He] should not have done that." Bart's musical also deletes Fagin's arrest and the musical ends with Fagin, faced with beginning again, pondering the possibility of going straight. The film version reverses this ending, with Fagin briefly considering reformation, but then gleefully teaming up again with Dodger to start their racket again. Moody's performance as the character is often considered the most critically acclaimed. He won a Golden Globe for his performance, and was nominated for the Academy Award for Best Actor. When Oliver! was brought to Broadway in 1964, Fagin was portrayed by Clive Revill, but in a 1984 revival, Moody reprised his performance opposite Tony Award winner Patti LuPone, who played Nancy. Moody later stated: "Fate destined me to play Fagin. It was the part of a lifetime."

Ben Kingsley's portrayal of Fagin in Roman Polanski's 2005 screen adaptation was also inspired by the 1948 version.

In the 1980 ATV series The Further Adventures of Oliver Twist, Fagin was played by David Swift. In this 13-episode series, Fagin has escaped his hanging by pretending to have had a stroke, which has left him paralyzed (and therefore unfit to be executed) and is in hiding at The Three Cripples, tended to by Barney.

In the 1982 made-for-TV movie version, Fagin is portrayed by George C. Scott. Although the character is generally portrayed as elderly, diminutive, and homely, Scott's version of the character was markedly younger, stronger, and better-looking. Also, this version of the character had him more caring of his orphan charges, feeding them well and treating them with obvious concern.

Ron Moody reprised the role of Fagin in the 1983 Channel 4 television program The Other Side of London.

In the 1985 miniseries, Fagin is portrayed by Eric Porter.

In Disney's animated version, Oliver & Company (1988), Fagin is a kind-hearted but poor man living in New York City. He lives in poverty with his five dogs and is desperately searching for money to repay his debts to a ruthless loan shark. This version does away with the moral quandary of child exploitation as all the characters are dogs who have no real need for money and genuinely want to help their owner. Informed by earlier portrayals, he retains a large nose, red hair, and a green coat, but his racial characteristics, religion or "Jewishness" play no role in his character. He is voiced by the Italian-American Dom DeLuise.

In 1994, Oliver! was revived in London. Fagin was played by many noted British actors and comedians, including Jonathan Pryce, George Layton, Jim Dale, Russ Abbot, Barry Humphries (who had played Mr Sowerberry in the original 1960 London production of Oliver!) and Robert Lindsay, who won an Olivier Award for his performance. The different actors playing Fagin were distinguished by their different costumes, especially their coats. Pryce used a patched red and brown coat, while Lindsay used the traditional dark green overcoat seen in the 1968 film version.

In the 1996-1997 Saban's Adventures of Oliver Twist series, Fagin is voiced by Brian George. In this version, instead of a human, he resembles a wise, old, and kind red fox.

In Disney's live action television production Oliver Twist (1997), Fagin is played by Richard Dreyfuss.

In the film Twisted (1996), a film loosely based on Dickens's Oliver Twist, the Fagin character is played by actor William Hickey.

In the miniseries Escape of the Artful Dodger (2001), Fagin is played by actor Christopher Baz.

In the film Twist (2003), a film also loosely based on Dickens' Oliver Twist, Fagin is played by actor Gary Farmer.

In a 2007 BBC television adaptation, Fagin is played by Timothy Spall. Contrary to his appearance in the novel, he is beardless and overweight in this version. He is also a more sympathetic character.

In December 2008, Oliver! was revived at the Theatre Royal, Drury Lane, London with Rowan Atkinson playing the character followed by Omid Djalili, Russ Abbot and Griff Rhys Jones. The production toured the UK and Ireland in 2011 to 2013 with Neil Morrissey and Brian Conley sharing the role.

In 2015–16, BBC2's Dickensian Fagin was played by the actor Anton Lesser.

In 2023, in the New York City Center Encores! revival of Oliver!, Fagin was played by Raúl Esparza and Gavin Lee.

In 2022, he was portrayed by Christopher Eccleston in the children's television series Dodger.

In 2023, he was portrayed by David Thewlis in the Disney's historical drama The Artful Dodger.

In 2024, Oliver! was revived at Chichester Festival Theatre, followed by a West End transfer at the Gielgud Theatre with Simon Lipkin playing the character.
