= Fagin the Jew =

2003 graphic novel by Will Eisner

Cover of Fagin the Jew by Will Eisner.

Fagin the Jew is a graphic novel by American cartoonist Will Eisner.

In this book, Eisner retells the story of Fagin from Charles Dickens' Oliver Twist from Fagin's point of view. Eisner portrays Fagin as a distressed and complex character, and tells the story of his life and his place in the Ashkenazic community of London in the first person, with many illustrations. The book was written in response to Eisner's belief that much classic literature contains antisemitic stereotypes, including Dickens' portrayal of Fagin. Eisner has cast the story in the form of an interview between Fagin and Dickens, on the night before Fagin is to be hanged, in which Fagin tells his life story and pleads for a more understanding portrayal by Dickens.

The book was published by Doubleday in 2003. A tenth anniversary edition was published by Dark Horse in 2013.

== Reception ==
In his 2008 500 Essential Graphic Novels, comics scholar Gene Kannenberg Jr. praised it as "skillfully executed, thought provoking, and enlightening".

New Internationalist called the book "sensitive", and a "remind[er to] cartoonists of the power of their pens and their responsibility to distinguish between good and bad stereotyping."

Publishers Weekly lauded its illustrations as "gorgeously expressive", emphasizing that "no one can convey a story through body language like Eisner", but faulted the narrative as "err[ing] on the side of extreme coincidence and melodrama", with an "awkwardly simplified run-through of Dickens' plot" and a "constant stream of expository dialogue [that] becomes laughable".

Booklist likewise found the narrative "starkly melodramatic [and] agenda-driven", and "lack[ing] nuance", but nonetheless considered the book to be "heartfelt", and compared it to John Gardner's Grendel.

== See also ==
- History of the Jews in England
