= Ikey Solomon =

English criminal

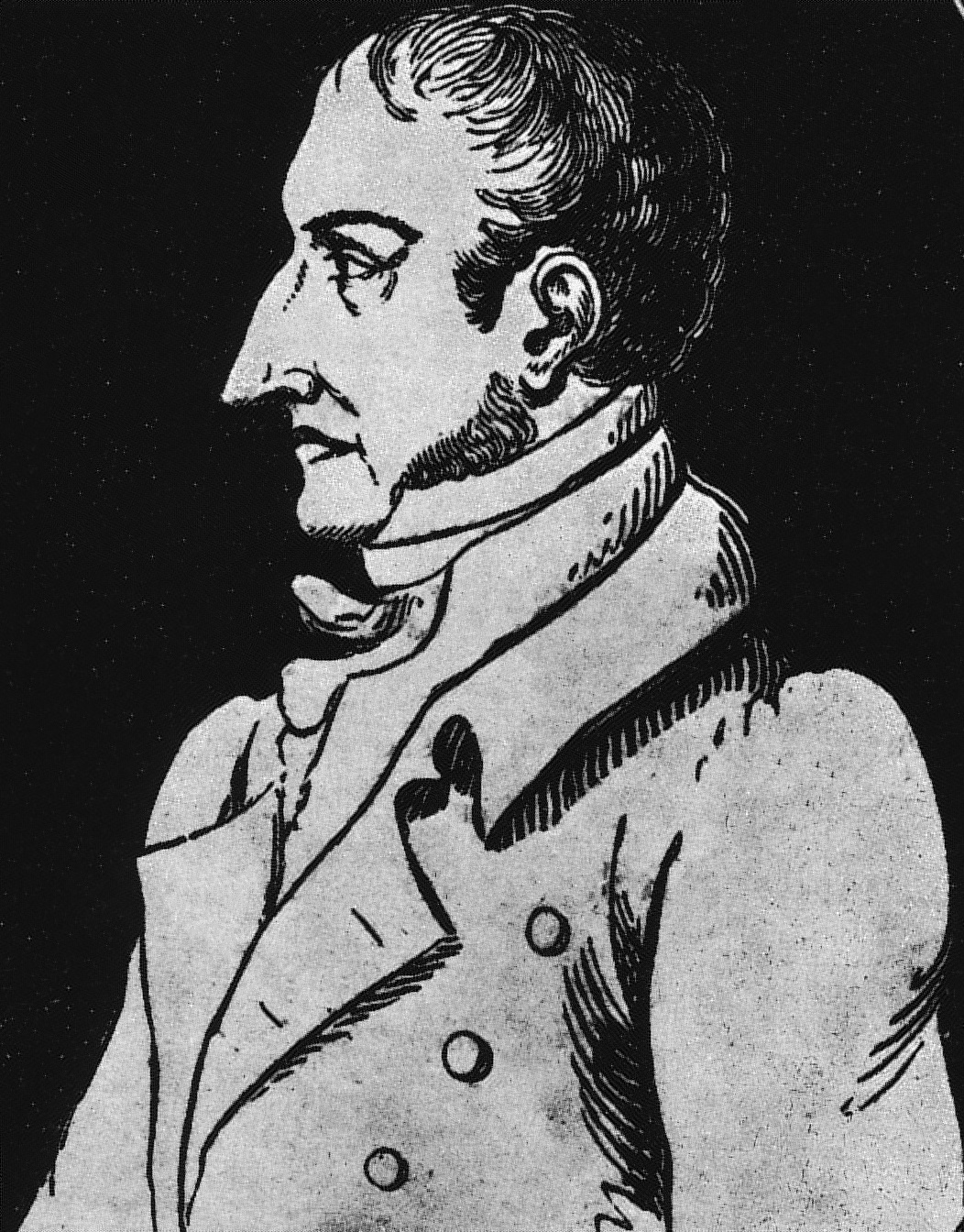
Ikey Solomon as printed from a drawing by the Lambeth Police

Isaac "Ikey" Solomon (c. 1787 – 1850) was a British criminal who acted as a receiver of stolen property. His well-publicised crimes, escape from arrest, recapture and trial led to his transportation to the Australian penal colony of Van Diemen's Land (now known as Tasmania).

He is widely regarded as the model for the character Fagin in Charles Dickens' novel Oliver Twist.

== Early life and marriage ==
Solomon was born into a Jewish family in Houndsditch, in the East End of London. He was one of nine children. His father, Henry Solomon, was a fence and introduced him to the criminal trade. Henry Solomon also worked in various places in London and once remarked "I have worked for every factory in London." Little is known about Solomon's mother except that she looked after her husband well into his old age.

Solomon married Ann (also known as Hannah) Julian on 7 January 1807 in the Great Synagogue, Duke's Place, London. Ann was the daughter of Moses Julian, coachmaster, of Aldgate.

== Criminal life ==
Solomon first had a shop in Brighton but later opened what was ostensibly a jeweller's shop in Bell Lane, London, in the vicinity of Petticoat Lane. (This business has also been described as a pawn shop.)

Solomon used the shop to carry on business as a receiver of stolen goods, known as a fence, becoming one of the most active Londoners in the "trade".

On 17 April 1810, Solomon and a man named Joel Joseph were caught stealing a pocket book (valued at 4 shillings) and £40 in bank notes from Thomas Dodd. This happened outside Westminster Hall (the site of Parliament) where a large crowd had gathered for a public meeting. Police chased the pair and caught them inside the Hall. Joseph attempted to get rid of the evidence by eating the bank notes while Solomon tried to ditch the notebook.

Both were arrested and tried at the Old Bailey during the June Sessions 1810 and found guilty of stealing, a felony. Solomon, just 23 years at the time, was sentenced to penal transportation, to spend the rest of his days in Australia. However, for reasons that are no longer clear, he remained in England, imprisoned in the prison hulk Zetland for four years, before being released in error or escaping.

Solomon returned to London in about 1818 and set up as a fence and pawn broker. He continued until being arrested again on 25 April 1827, when police charged Solomon with theft and receiving. The goods involved were 6 watches, 3 1/2 yards of woollen cloth, 17 shawls, 12 pieces of Valentia cloth, lace, bobbinet, caps and other articles. Solomon was committed for trial and lodged in Newgate Prison. Solomon gained substantial notoriety with this arrest. Pamphlet publishers created three highly exaggerated accounts of his criminal activity, which sold very well.

On a writ of habeas corpus, jailers took Solomon to the Court of King's Bench. The application failed, and the guards led him to a hackney coach for the return to Newgate. Unknown to his captors, the coach was driven by Solomon's father-in-law. The turnkeys approved a detour through Petticoat Lane. At a prearranged place, some of Solomon's friends overpowered the guards and released him.

== Abscondment and his wife's arrest ==
Solomon fled England, going first to Denmark and then to the United States, arriving in New York in August 1827.

Solomon's escape from custody was prominent news throughout England. Police quickly focused on his family.

Officers arrested Solomon's wife, Ann, and charged her with receiving stolen goods. She was found guilty and sentenced to penal transportation to Van Diemen's Land (Tasmania). The judge allowed Solomon's four youngest children (all under the age of ten) to accompany Ann on the transport ship. Their two oldest sons, John, 20, and Moses, 19, sailed to Sydney and then to Van Diemen's Land independently to be with their mother.

Solomon's father was also charged with theft, but the court allowed his sentence to be respited because of his age (Henry claimed "I am upwards of seventy years old". The Old Bailey records him as being 69).

== Journey to be with his wife ==
Ann travelled in the ship Mermaid, arriving at Hobart Town penal colony in June 1828. Back in New York, Solomon learned from newspapers that his wife had been transported. He decided he would sail to Van Diemen's Land to be with her. Solomon first went to Rio de Janeiro, then sailed in the Coronet to Hobart. He travelled under the name of Slowman, probably a mispronunciation of Solomon rather than an assumed name.

Hobart, Van Diemen's Land's capital, was the enforced home of many of Solomon's old criminal colleagues and customers. These individuals quickly recognised Solomon when he arrived on 6 October 1828. Solomon's London escape had made him a notorious fugitive, but he had not broken any laws in the Colony. As a result, the Lieutenant-Governor Colonel George Arthur could not arrest Solomon without a warrant from London. On 17 October 1828 he wrote to the Colonial Office requesting one. This warrant took 12 months to reach Hobart. In the meantime, Solomon opened a tobacco shop/general store in Hobart's Elizabeth Street. He also began petitioning to have his wife assigned to his household.

Ann Solomon had initially been assigned as a servant to police officer Richard Newman, but quarrels broke out and she was sent to the Van Diemen's Land Female House of Correction. Solomon made a number of requests that Ann be assigned to him. Lieutenant-Governor Arthur finally agreed to the assignment after Solomon entered into a £1,000 bond to guarantee that his wife would not escape from the colony, and a number of local publicans and merchants, including John Pascoe Fawkner, entered into sureties of £100 or £200 each.

== Arrest and return to England ==
The warrants for Solomon's arrest finally arrived in November 1829 aboard the Lady of the Lake. Hobart authorities immediately arrested him.

Solomon's counsel, however, had him brought before the court on a writ of habeas corpus. The judge approved Solomon's release because of a technical fault in the London warrants, but fixed bail at £2,000, with four sureties of £500.

Solomon's friends found it difficult to raise so much money. Lieutenant-Governor Arthur finally issued a warrant in his own name against Solomon. Police arrested Solomon and placed him on board the ship Prince Regent to be sent back to England.

Sydney and Hobart newspapers denounced the governor's refusal to abide by the principles of habeas corpus. Thomas Capon, the chief constable, had to accompany Solomon on the voyage because the ship's master refused to guarantee Solomon's safe arrival.

== Trial and return to the penal colony ==
Solomon's trial at the Old Bailey in June 1830 caused a sensation and was extensively reported in the newspapers and the pamphlets of the day. As there are strong similarities between his trial and Fagin's trial in Oliver Twist (Ch 52), it is highly likely that Dickens used it as the basis for Fagin's trial.

Solomon was tried at the Old Bailey on eight charges of receiving stolen goods, found guilty on two, and sentenced to transportation for fourteen years. The judge referred to Solomon as being "evil-disposed", another indication of the large notoriety he had garnered.

Solomon was sent back to Hobart in the William Glen Anderson, arriving in November 1831. He was sent to Richmond gaol, where in 1832 he became a "javelin man", or convict constable. In 1834, he was transferred to Port Arthur Convict Settlement. In 1835, authorities granted Solomon a ticket of leave on condition that he lived at least 20 miles (32 km) from Hobart.

== Family break-up ==
When Solomon was released from prison, he took up residence at New Norfolk and tried to reunite with his family, but the two elder sons seem to have left Van Diemen's Land by then.

Solomon had become estranged from his wife and children, and there were violent quarrels. Most of the children took their mother's side. Some sources say that Solomon turned the children out of his house, and others say that the children turned out their father.

Ann Solomon was returned to the Female House of Correction as a result of some of these altercations. Her daughter Ann had to write numerous petitions before her mother was released in September 1835.

Solomon and Ann lived apart for the remainder of their lives. The elder Ann Solomon was granted a ticket-of-leave in November 1835, and a conditional pardon in May 1840.

Solomon remained in New Norfolk until 1838. He was living at New Town in 1840 when he was granted a conditional pardon. He received his certificate of freedom in 1844.

== Death ==
Solomon died on 3 September 1850 and was buried the next day in the Jewish cemetery in Harrington Street, Hobart. His estate was worth no more than £70.

What remained of the little Jewish cemetery, possibly the oldest Jewish cemetery in Australia, was bulldozed in 2002. It had been officially closed in 1872, and following the seizure of the property by the state in 1945, what memorials remained were removed as an apartment complex was built on the site over the next decade.

== Literary treatment ==
Solomon remains known as the person upon whom Charles Dickens may have based the character of Fagin in the novel Oliver Twist.

Solomon's life has been the subject of several works, including:

- The First Fagin by Judith Sackville-O'Donnell, ISBN 0-9585576-2-4
- Prince of Fences: The Life and Crimes of Ikey Solomons by J.J. Tobias, ISBN 0-85303-174-6
- The Potato Factory by Bryce Courtenay, ISBN 0-14-027365-4, a historical novel that was made into a four-part miniseries that aired in Australia
- Thanks a lot, Guv! – The Stories of Eight Convicts, from Trial in England to Detention and Freedom in Van Diemen's Land by T. Garth Hyland, ISBN 0-9751610-0-8, also a historical novel.

Solomon was Jewish. His literary and historical treatment have been the focus of many debates. Some argue that many portrayals of Ikey Solomon have been anti-Semitic. Bryce Courtenay's Ikey character in The Potato Factory has recently been the subject of such debate. The Fagin character, with its connection to Ikey, has caused similar debate.

== Documentaries ==
- The first Fagin by Helen Gaynor and Alan Rosenthal, Canberra – A.C.T., Ronin Films, 2012

== See also ==
- List of convicts transported to Australia
