= Great Expectations (2023 TV series) =

2023 historical television drama

- Genre: Historical drama
- Based on: Great Expectations by Charles Dickens
- Written by: Steven Knight
- Directed by: Brady Hood; Samira Radsi
- Starring: Olivia Colman; Fionn Whitehead; Shalom Brune-Franklin
- Countries of origin: United Kingdom; United States
- Original language: English
- No. of episodes: 6

Production
- Executive producers: Steven Knight; Tom Hardy; Ridley Scott; Dean Baker; David W. Zucker; Kate Crowe; Tommy Bulfin
- Running time: 58 minutes
- Production companies: BBC; FXP; Scott Free Productions; Hardy Son & Baker; Nebulastar

Original release
- Network: BBC One (UK); FX on Hulu (US)
- Release: 26 March – 30 April 2023

Great Expectations is a six-part historical drama series developed by Steven Knight, based on the 1861 novel by Charles Dickens. It premiered on BBC One on 26 March 2023, followed by its US premiere on FX on Hulu later the same day.

== Premise ==
Great Expectations is the coming-of-age story of Pip, an orphan who yearns for a greater lot in life, until a twist of fate and the evil machinations of the mysterious and eccentric "Miss Havisham" shows him a dark world of possibilities. Under the great expectations placed upon him, Pip will have to work out the true cost of this new world and whether it will truly make him the man he wishes to be. A damning critique of the class system, Dickens' novel was published in 1861 after first release in weekly chapters in December 1860.

== Cast ==
- Fionn Whitehead as Pip
  - Tom Sweet as young Pip
- Johnny Harris as Magwitch
- Trystan Gravelle as Compeyson
- Owen McDonnell as Joe
- Hayley Squires as Sara
- Tim Key as Mr Wopsle
- Matt Berry as Mr Pumblechook
- Olivia Colman as Miss Havisham
- Ashley Thomas as Jaggers
- Shalom Brune-Franklin as Estella
  - Chloe Lea as young Estella
- Laurie Ogden as Biddy
- Rudi Dharmalingam as John Wemmick
- Matthew Needham as Bentley Drummle

== Episodes ==
No.	Title	Directed by	Written by	Original release date	BBC One broadcast	UK viewers (millions)
1	"Episode 1"	Brady Hood	Steven Knight	26 March 2023	26 March 2023	4.51
2	"Episode 2"	Brady Hood	Steven Knight	2 April 2023	2 April 2023	3.38
3	"Episode 3"	Brady Hood	Steven Knight	9 April 2023	9 April 2023	2.87
4	"Episode 4"	Brady Hood	Steven Knight	16 April 2023	16 April 2023	N/A
5	"Episode 5"	Samira Radsi	Steven Knight	23 April 2023	23 April 2023	N/A
6	"Episode 6"	Samira Radsi	Steven Knight	30 April 2023	30 April 2023	N/A

== Production ==
Knight announced in May 2020 that he would develop a television series adaptation of the Charles Dickens novel in collaboration between the BBC and FX, his second after 2019's A Christmas Carol.

In February 2022, the cast for the series was announced, with Olivia Colman cast as Miss Havisham, and Fionn Whitehead cast as Pip. Filming began by March 2022, with production taking place at Buckler's Hard, Hampshire on 30 March.

== Reception ==
On the review aggregator website Rotten Tomatoes, 44% of 41 critics' reviews are positive, with an average rating of 5.4/10. The website's consensus reads: "Even with the inestimable Olivia Colman as a ringer, Steven Knight's try-hard reimagining of Dickens' masterwork falls well below expectations." Metacritic, which uses a weighted average, assigned a score of 52 out of 100 based on 17 critics, indicating "mixed or average reviews".
