= Great Expectations (1981 TV series) =

- Ad with Gerry Sundquist as Pip
- Based on: Great Expectations by Charles Dickens
- Written by: James Andrew Hall
- Directed by: Julian Amyes
- Starring: Stratford Johns; Gerry Sundquist; Joan Hickson
- Theme music composer: Paul Reade
- Country of origin: United Kingdom
- Original language: English
- No. of episodes: 12

Production
- Producer: Barry Letts
- Editor: Oliver White
- Running time: 30 minutes

Original release
- Network: BBC1
- Release: 4 October – 20 December 1981

Great Expectations is a 1981 BBC drama serial based on the 1861 novel by Charles Dickens. It was directed by Julian Amyes and adapted by James Andrew Hall.

== Cast ==
- Gerry Sundquist - Pip
- Joan Hickson - Miss Havisham
- Stratford Johns - Abel Magwitch
- Phillip Joseph - Joe Gargery
- Sarah-Jane Varley - Estella
- Derek Francis - Jaggers
- Colin Jeavons - Mr. Wemmick
- Tim Munro - Herbert Pocket
- Linal Haft - Orlick
- Peter Whitbread - Compeyson
- Christine Absalom - Biddy
- Iain Ormsby-Knox - Bentley Drummle
- John Stratton - Uncle Pumblechook
- Marjorie Yates - Mrs. Joe Gargery
- Patsy Kensit - Young Estella
- Peter Benson - Mr. Wopsle
- Melanie Hughes - Clara Barley
- Colin Mayes - Trabb's boy
- Graham McGrath - Pip (aged 9)
- Paul Davies Prowles - Pip (aged 12)
- Tony Sympson - Aged Parent
- Janet Henfrey - Camilla
