= Camperdown Cemetery =

Cemetery in Sydney, New South Wales, Australia

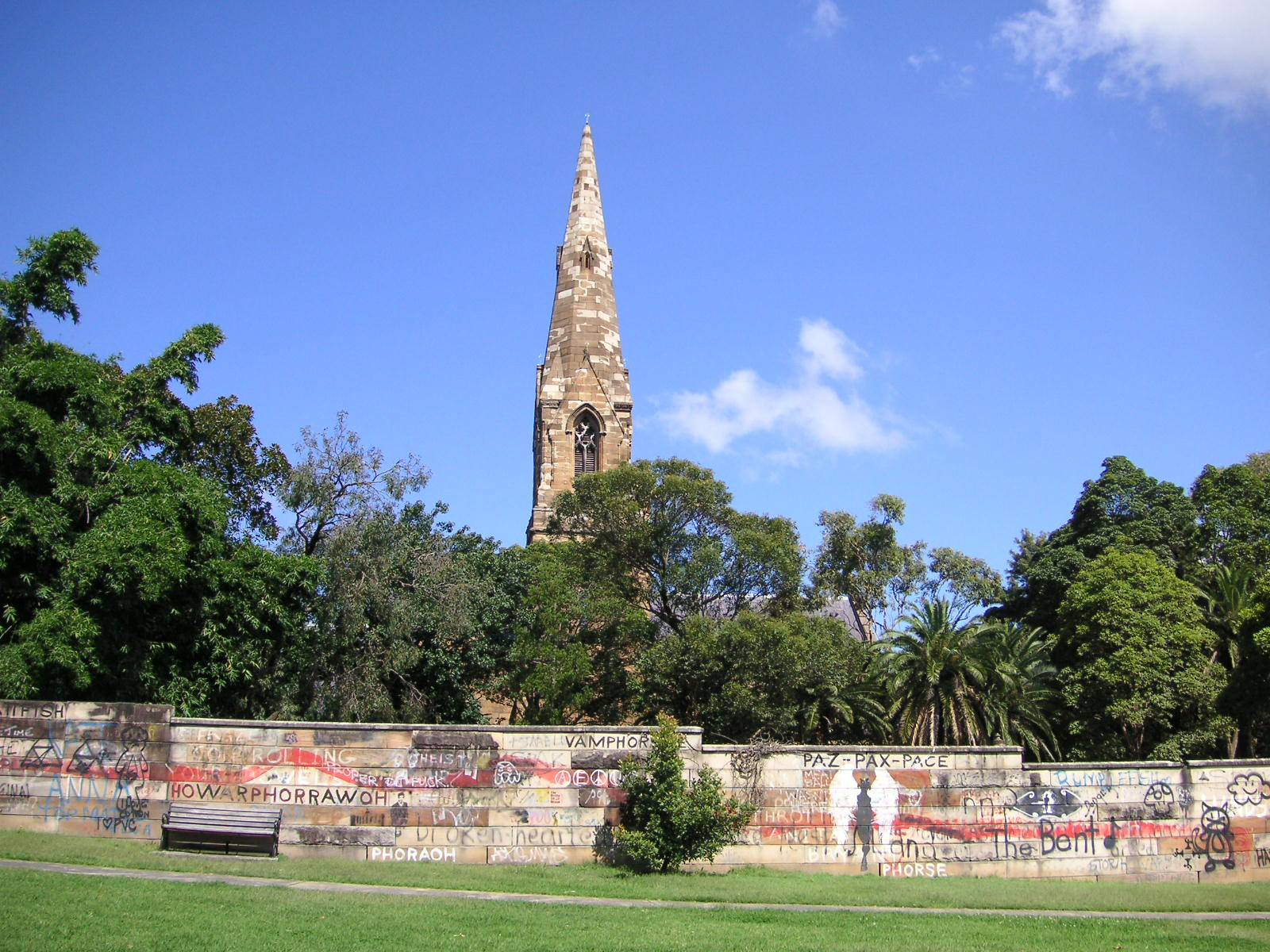
- Camperdown Cemetery is an "oasis" in a densely built-up area.
- Interactive map of Camperdown Cemetery

Details
- Established: 1848
- Location: Newtown, New South Wales
- Country: Australia
- Type: Closed
- Size: Orig 12 acres 3 roods (5.2 ha); 4 acres (1.6 ha)
- No. of graves: 18,000
- Find a Grave: Camperdown Cemetery

Camperdown Cemetery is a historic cemetery located on Church Street in Newtown, an inner-city suburb of Sydney, New South Wales, Australia. The cemetery was founded in 1848 and was for twenty years the main general cemetery for Sydney, with the total number of burials being about 18,000. Many people who were important to the early history of colonial Australia are buried there. It is the only one of Sydney's three main early cemeteries that still exists.

As well as historic monuments, the cemetery also preserves important elements of landscape gardening of the mid-19th century, and examples of native flora, which are now rare in the built-up inner city. St Stephen's Anglican Church is located within the present bounds of the cemetery. The site, with St Stephen's Church, is listed by the Heritage Council of New South Wales and the National Register as a site of national importance.

Camperdown Cemetery is associated with numerous sensational stories, several reputed ghosts and a murder. It is used regularly for historical and genealogical research. Because of its historical importance and convenient location, it is also a venue for excursions by schools and historical societies. Camperdown Cemetery is valued by the residents of Newtown as providing a major greenspace located in the immediate vicinity of a busy commercial centre. In a densely populated area of small terrace houses without substantial gardens, the cemetery functions as a recreational area and a venue for many family and social activities.

== Description ==
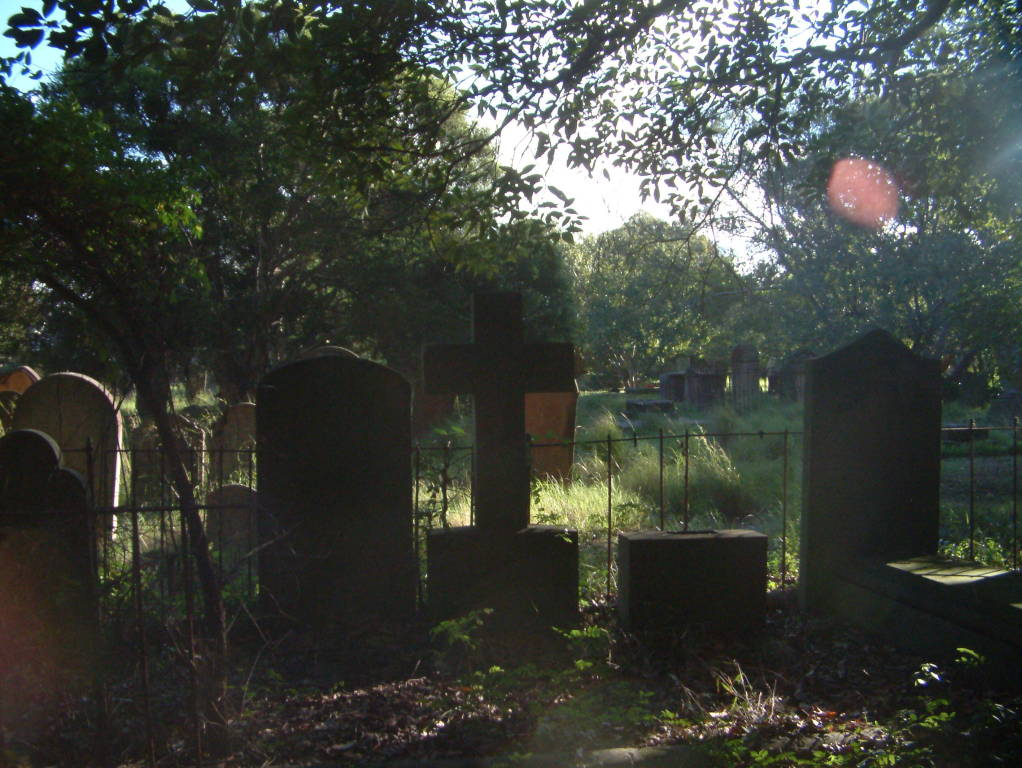
Camperdown Cemetery

Camperdown Cemetery is a walled 4-acre (1.6 ha) portion of a mid-19th century cemetery, originally of nearly 13 acres (5.26 ha). It contains the most significant elements of the original landscape plan, which are the sexton's lodge, the gateposts, the original carriageway known as Jamison Avenue, a circular driveway known as Broughton Drive and a number of trees planted in the mid-19th century. This remaining section of the original cemetery contains about 2,000 tombstones and other memorials and monuments of which many came from the resumed area outside the wall. Many of the monuments were erected to families or individuals who are famous for their part in the history of 19th-century Australia. The monuments are mostly in Sydney sandstone, predating the fashion for marble memorials. A small number of the later monuments are in marble or granite. One of the largest memorials, that to the Barker family, was brought from Scotland. About 90% of the monuments are the work of a local mason, John Roote Andrews, and his family. Within Camperdown Cemetery stand the Cemetery Lodge (1848), St Stephen's Anglican Church (1871–78), and the St Stephen's Rectory (1910).

The trees include a Moreton Bay fig (Ficus macrophylla) and a number of oaks (Quercus robur) that were planted in 1848 and are the oldest trees in the Marrickville district. The dominant species of tree in the cemetery are brush box (Lophostemon confertus), which were planted in the 1960s and 1970s. The other species include several large spreading blackwoods (Acacia melanoxylon), a row of Canary Island palms (Phoenix canariensis) along one side of Jamison Avenue dating from the 1930s, a grove of Chinese elms (Ulmus parvifolia), two large African olives (Olea africana), lemon-scented gum (Corymbia citriodora), Melaleucas, a Port Jackson Cypress pine (Callitris rhomboidea) and two stands of giant bamboo.

Several large areas of the cemetery were covered with topsoil and planted with exotic grasses to create mown lawns in the 1950s and these have been maintained, and in places planted with bulbs. At the rear of the cemetery native grasses continued to grow, making this the largest inner-city remnant of the native flora of the original Turpentine–Ironbark forest that once covered the area. The major species is kangaroo grass (Themeda triandra), but there are a number of other species present including Dianella.

== History ==
=== Foundation ===
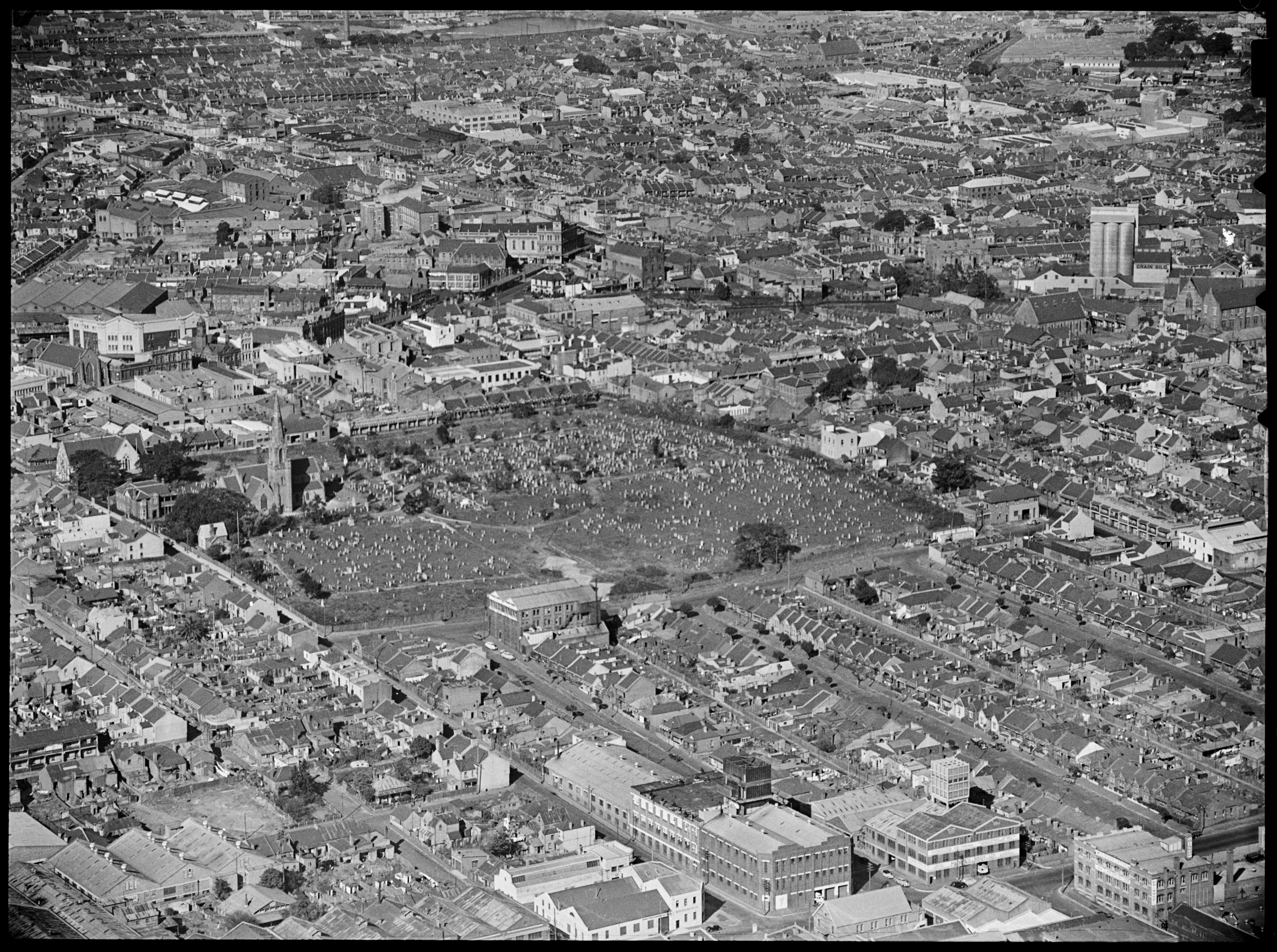
Aerial view over Camperdown Cemetery before resumption, July 1946

Camperdown Cemetery was founded in 1848 and consecrated in 1849. It was founded as an Anglican General Cemetery, accepting the dead of all denominations, but burying them with the rites of the Church of England. Previous cemeteries in Sydney were the so-called Old Burial Ground of 1792, in George Street on the site of the Sydney Town Hall, and the New Burial Ground (1819–68) in Devonshire Street on the site of Central railway station, Sydney.

The cemetery was proposed by a group of Sydney businessmen who formed the Church of England Cemetery Trust and in 1848 purchased 13 acres (53,000 m^{2}) of land "beyond the boundary stone" of Sydney, from Maurice Charles O'Connell, grandson of Governor Bligh. The land was part of a grant made to Governor Bligh and named "Camperdown" by him in commemoration of the Battle of Camperdown in which he had taken part. The land passed to his daughter Mary, who married Bligh's Aide de Camp, Major Putland, and following his death, Sir Maurice O'Connell. The cemetery was consecrated by Bishop William Grant Broughton on 16 January 1849.

The first interment was that of Bligh's son-in law, Lieutenant Governor Sir Maurice O'Connell who died in 1848, shortly before the cemetery was opened. His remains were exhumed from Devonshire Street, and reburied with due honours and a large memorial at the top of the hill at Camperdown. In the 1850s the small headstone of Mary's first husband, John Putland, who had died in 1808 and been buried at the Old Burial Ground, was given by St Philip's, York Street, and placed in the cemetery where it became the oldest memorial. The first burial was that of John Holden Michie, son of Archibald Michie who campaigned to end the transportation of convicts to Australia. Another significant burial in the same year is that of Sarah, wife of Bishop Broughton, who rests beneath the largest slab of stone in the cemetery. The Bishop planted a Chinese elm at the foot of her grave, and since then a small grove of these trees has sprung up in that part of the cemetery.

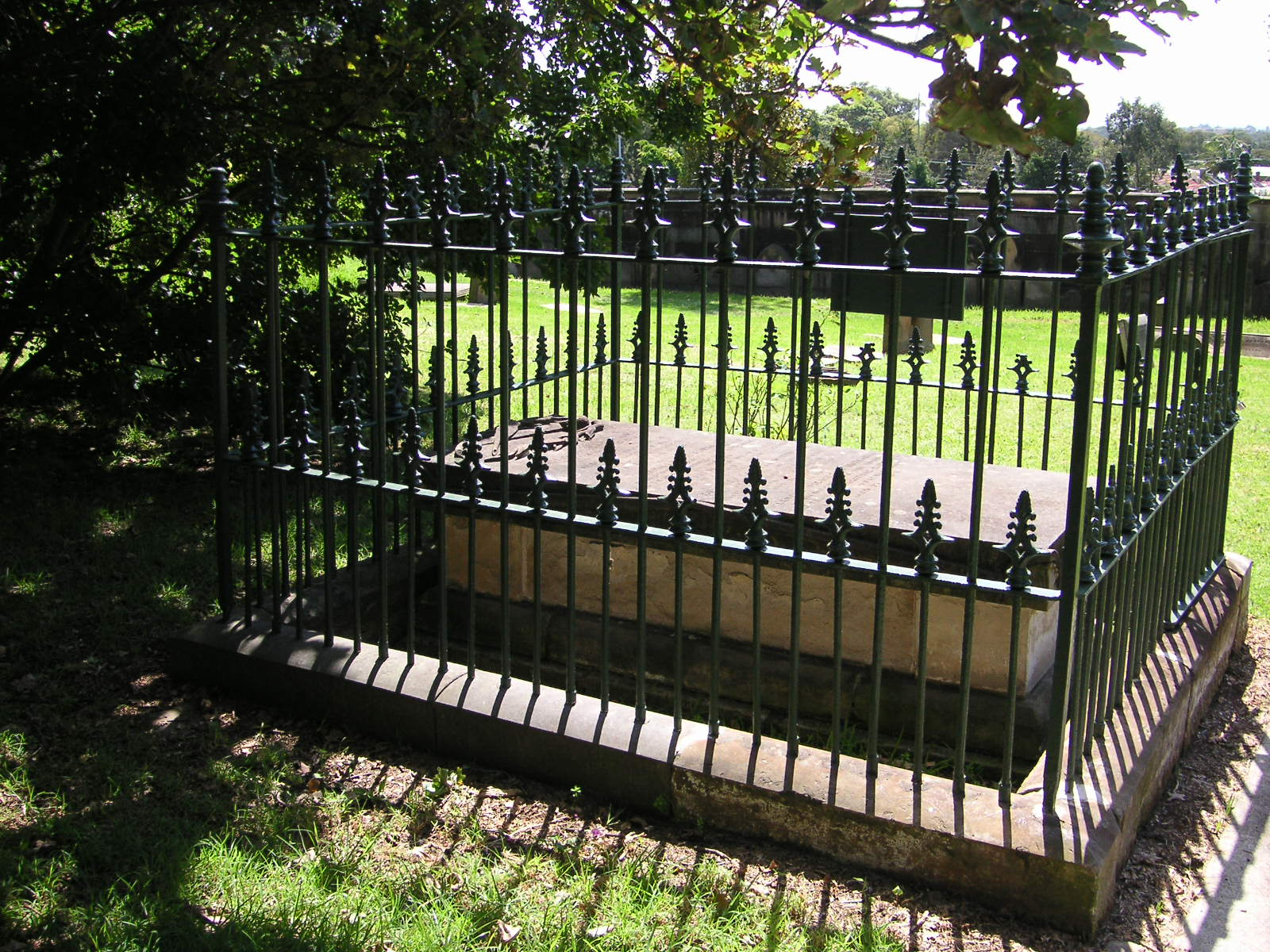
The grave of Major Mitchell, Surveyor General

=== Closure to sales ===
In 1868, Camperdown Cemetery was closed against the sale of any further plots. The cemetery was not at that time full. However, because the Trust that controlled the cemetery was connected to the Church of England, the Parliament received no income from it and opened three new cemeteries that year, Rookwood Cemetery, South Head Cemetery and Gore Hill Cemetery. Stories were circulated about "bad air" rising from Camperdown Cemetery. Complaints were made that people had seen coffins covered with only a few inches of soil. This undeniable fact gave the impression that the management of the cemetery was severely at fault. However, it related to a purely practical matter. Half of the burials were of paupers, who were placed in communal graves at the expense of the government or the Benevolent Society. These took place at 9.00 am and 4.00 pm each day. Graves were dug deep enough to contain three or four coffins, and an unfilled grave might frequently be left open between the morning and afternoon burials in order to receive another coffin. From 1868, there were no more pauper's burials at Camperdown. The Cemetery continued in use, but only for the burial of people who had already purchased plots. There were about 15,733 burials from 1849 to 1867, 2,057 from 1868 to 1900 and only 172 burials between 1900 and the 1940s. The majority of the burials were done by the Rev. Charles Kemp, first rector of St Stephen's, Newtown. Rees claims that Kemp performed 16,000 burials from 1848 to 1870.

=== Building of St Stephen's ===
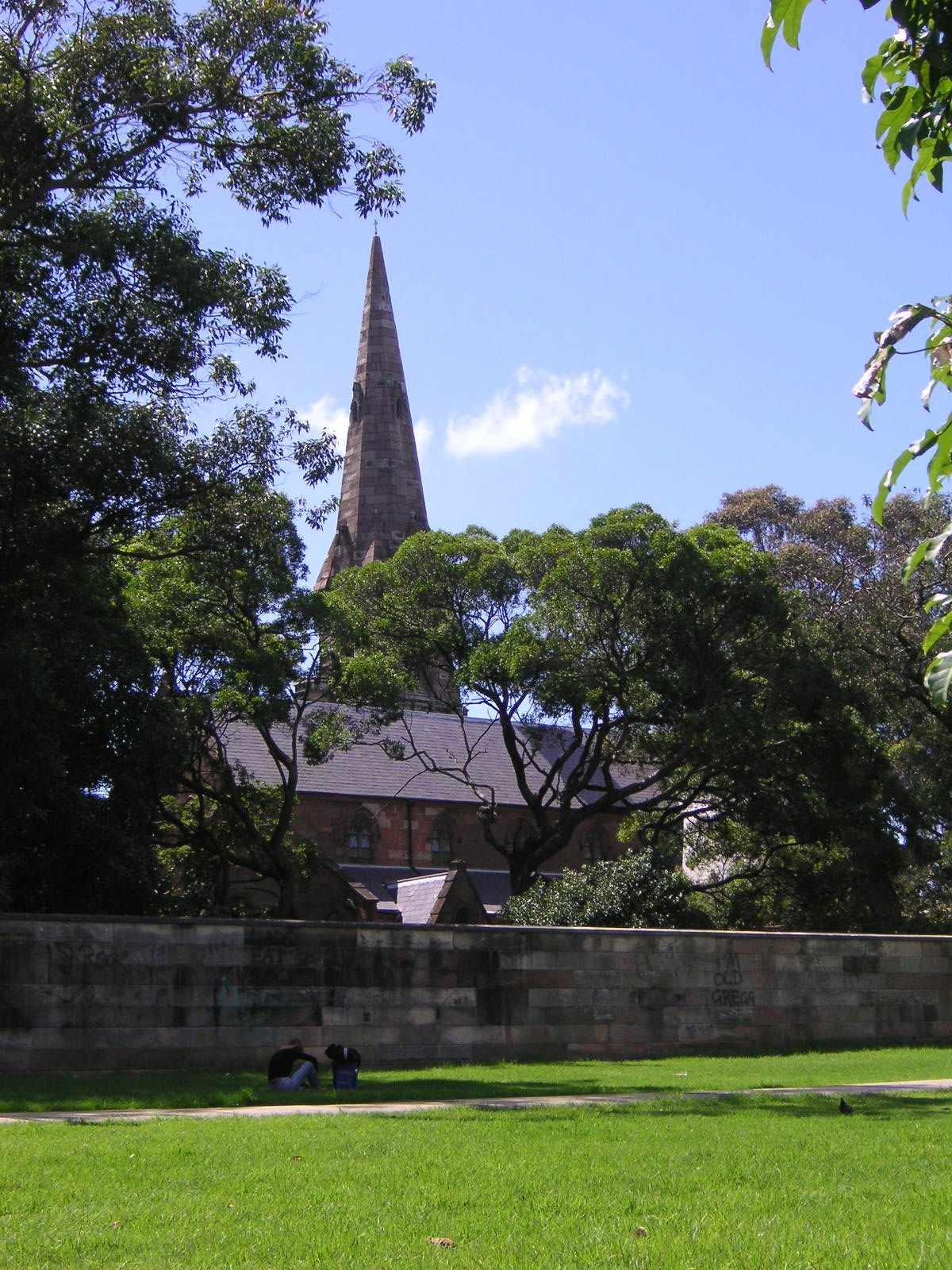
View from Camperdown Memorial Rest Park

In 1871, the small Church of St Stephen's Newtown, built by Edmund Blacket in 1844, could no longer contain the congregation. A site was needed for a larger church. By an Act of Parliament, the Church of England was permitted to build a church within the existent cemetery and Edmund Blacket was again the architect. The resulting St Stephen's Church, which held its first service in 1874, is a masterpiece of Gothic Revival architecture, and contributes greatly to the heritage significance of the site as a whole.

=== Camperdown Memorial Rest Park ===
By the 1940s the cemetery was overgrown. In June 1946, the naked body of a murdered girl, 11-year-old Joan Norma Ginn, was found in the cemetery. This prompted action on behalf of the local council.

In 1948, an Act of the NSW State Parliament established the Camperdown Memorial Rest Park, which was put under the control of the local council. All but 4 acres (16,000 m^{2}) of land were resumed as public space. The area of cemetery that adjoined St Stephen's Church was walled off from the park and continued to be managed by a body of trustees. Outside the wall, the park was cleared of trees and monuments, and a memorial garden, planted initially with Peace roses, was established on the south side. (Note: Forty years later, Marrickville Council removed the rose bushes as they required too much maintenance.)

The removal of the memorials from the park was a heritage disaster, resulting in the damage of a great number of the stones. Some of the larger and more significant memorials were re-erected within the smaller space. Hundreds of stelae tombstones were stood around the inside of the new stone wall and fixed to it with steel pins and cement. By 1980 the steel pins had rusted and expanded, cracking and defacing many of the stones. Other stelae were simply laid out in rows like pavers. Broken stones were reused at other sites and can be found bordering the fence of a nearby playground.

The chairman of the trust at that time was P. W. Gledhill, a trustee from 1924 until his death in 1962 and whose enthusiasm for the project left many visible marks on the cemetery. Gledhill rescued endangered monuments of all sorts and brought them to the cemetery, where they contribute to the landscape. These include the Erskineville water fountain, a longitude and latitude marker on a plinth made out of salvaged pieces of Camperdown Villa, and the pediment from the Maritime Services Board building dating from the 1850s. In the 1960s the gateposts of the entrance were set further apart, and new gates were installed in memory of Gledhill. His 1946 book A Stroll through the Historic Camperdown Cemetery, NSW lists many notable burials and monuments and includes detailed maps of the cemetery as it was before its conversion to a park.

=== Decline and recovery ===
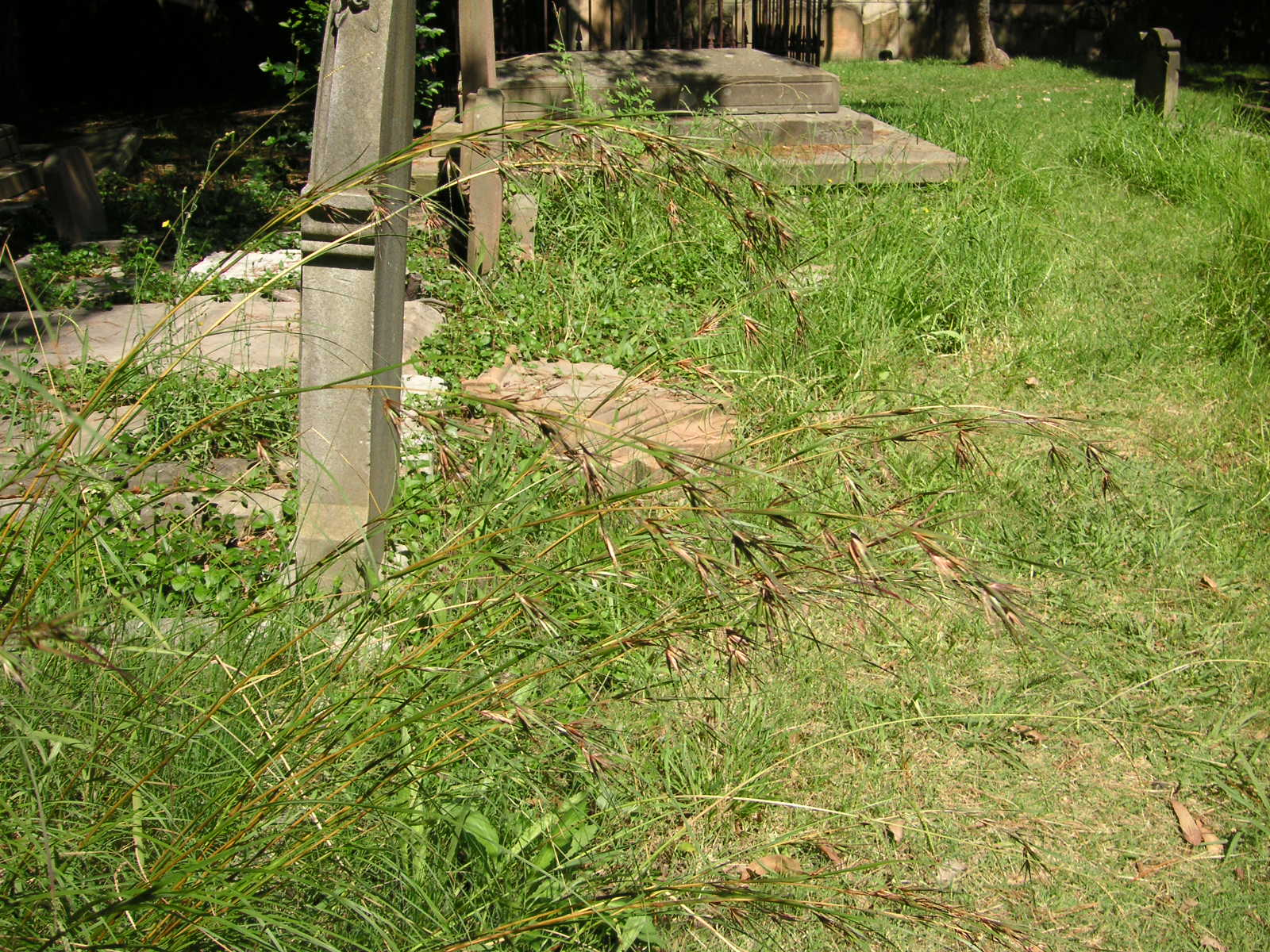
Kangaroo grass

In the 1950s and '60s, the demographics of Newtown changed greatly due to influx of migrants from Southern Europe, the congregation at St Stephen's Church diminished, and for a time it appeared that the church might be closed. At this time, the cemetery suffered much from general neglect and uncurbed vandalism. From the late 1970s onwards, there was a growing interest in the cultural and heritage aspects of the site. Because the cemetery represented a greenspace in a densely populated area, it became increasingly used as a recreational space by the general public and became a venue for daily dog-walking, picnics, birthday parties, wedding parties and all sorts of other events. It also became a popular film location, appearing in Priscilla, Queen of the Desert.

One group, the "Camperdown Cemetery Dog Walkers" have been particularly active in maintaining the cemetery and supporting its conservation. (Note: "Concerning the odd looking people in the cemetery, walking dogs, lying on graves and generally loitering: they are, for the greater part, our most welcome Newtown Community...." Excerpt from a letter of reassurance to an anxious visitor from the Secretary of the Cemetery Trust, 11 April 1999) Another group of volunteers regularly weed and maintain the areas of native grassland. One individual volunteer, the elderly Joyce Knuckey, contributed almost daily to the cemetery's maintenance for many years.

In the late 1980s a Bicentennial Heritage Grant made possible the restoration of the Cemetery Lodge and the basic repair of many broken monuments. This followed in the 1990s with donations from the New South Wales Institution of Surveyors for the restoration of the tomb of Sir Thomas Mitchell and from the Andrews family for the restoration of their family memorial. A conservation strategy for monuments was created, a landscape management plan was commenced and several individual studies focussed on aspects of the cemetery such as inscriptions, trees, native flora and the Dunbar tomb. Since 2001, the gateposts have been repositioned and the original gates restored. The vandalised gravestone of one of the cemetery's best-known inhabitants, Eliza Emily Donnithorne, a jilted bride who may have inspired Charles Dickens' creation of Miss Havisham in Great Expectations, has been restored.

== Features ==
=== Cemetery Lodge ===
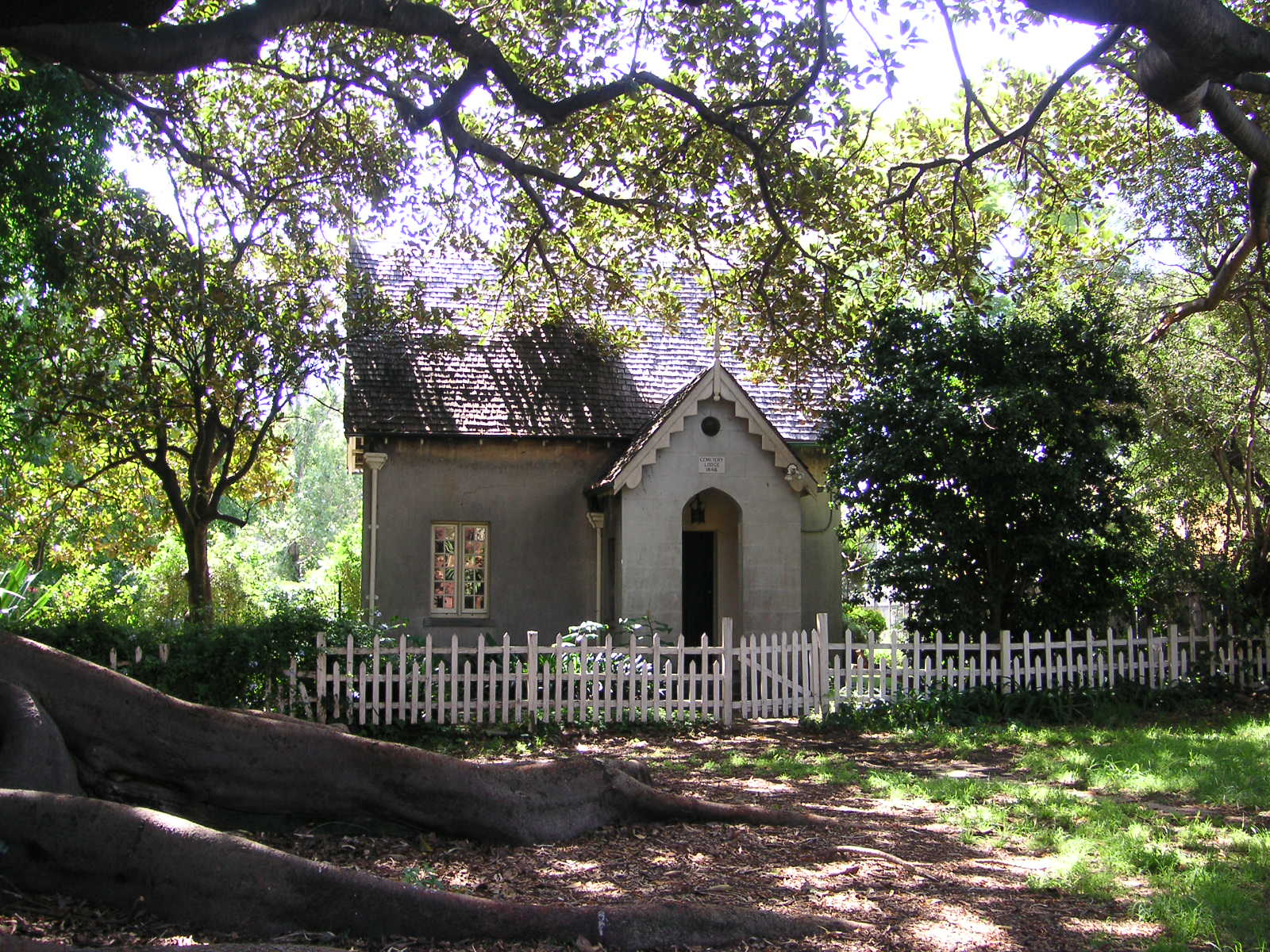
Cemetery Lodge, in the shadow of the fig tree

The lodge is a small cottage of three rooms and an attic, which stands in the right corner of the remaining area of the cemetery, when approached through the gates from Church Street. It is built of brick and partly rendered, with a steep shingled gabled roof and a projecting porch. The pitch of the roof and the arch of the door are indicative of the Colonial Neo-Gothic style. The original entrance to the cemetery was immediately outside the lodge and the driveway, Jamison Avenue, passed by it. A new driveway was later constructed to pass by St Stephen's Church, and one of the gateposts moved to its present site.

=== Fig tree ===
It is believed that the Moreton Bay fig tree was planted in 1848 to commemorate the roofing of the lodge, possibly following a Northern European custom of placing a small sapling on the roof on the day that the ridge is set in place. The tree has a span of more than 30 metres and, with the oak trees that were planted in the same year, is the oldest tree in the Marrickville District.

=== Monuments ===
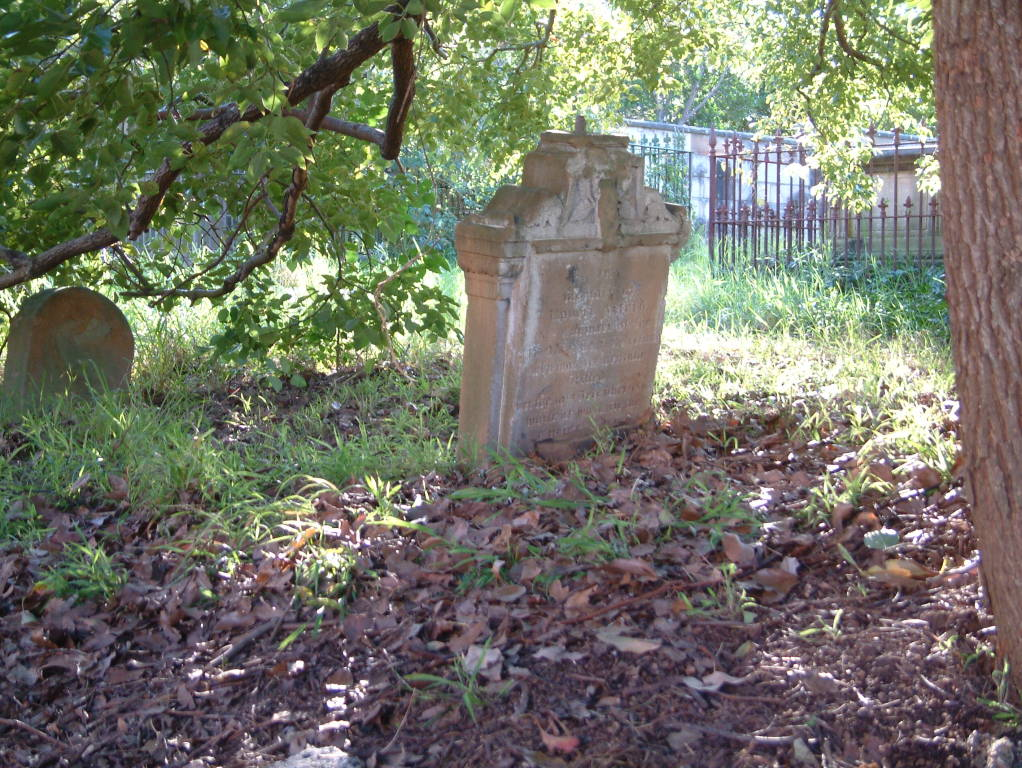
Stele account for the greatest number of monuments

There are a great variety of monuments within the cemetery, but the vast majority of them are carved from Sydney sandstone and are the product of a single monumental mason, John Roote Andrews, who had his premises nearby on Prospect Street.

The most common style of monument is the simple upright tombstone or stele. These come in four basic styles: round-headed, Gothic, Classical or crosses. The round headed stones have a simple arched top, sometimes with moulding cut along the edge. They may be decorated with a symbolic motif carved in relief, such as an hour glass, or a drooping flower. The Neo-Gothic style stones have tops that rise to pointed arches. Several such stones are carved with detailed Gothic tracery and other architectonic features. There are also a number of stones with steeply pointed "gables" and Gothic details. These included the stone that Edmund Blacket designed for his wife Sarah. The stones of a Classicising style form an interesting group, because while some are carved with elaborate Italianate scrolls and pediments, many are blank templates, with the outlined forms of scrolled shoulders, but with no finished architectonic details. The crosses form a smaller group. In nearly every instance they take the form of a Celtic cross, the addition of a circle giving much greater strength to the form when carved in sandstone.

Many graves are covered by horizontal slabs. While most simply rest on the grave, several of these, such as that of the Tooth family are very large and cover an underground vault. There are also a number of horizontal coffin-shaped or hogs-back stones such as that of Isaac Nathan. Another horizontal form is the chest or altar-style monument which has Classical architectonic detailing, of which the tomb of Sir Thomas Mitchell is a typical example. Other monuments are large Classicising, pedimented structures, surmounted by draped urns, such as that of Hannah Watson. There are also several columns, those that are broken signifying a life cut short, and those complete and topped by an urn signifying a life fulfilled.

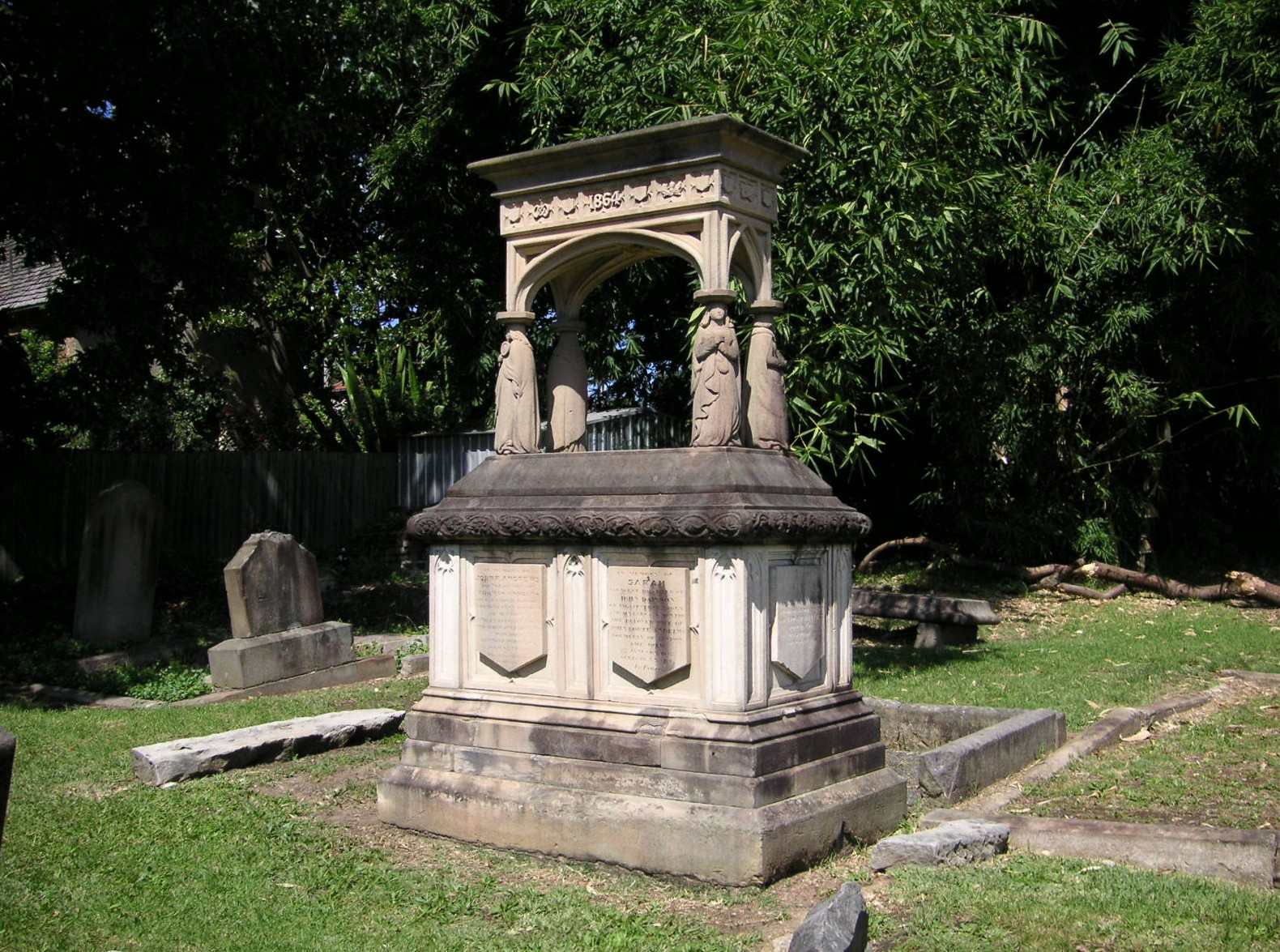
The Andrews monument

Of those stones that have carvings, some motifs occur many times. Angels with trumpets herald the day of Resurrection. A bud on a broken stem signifies a child has died before reaching its full bloom. A rose and a bud signifies a woman who has died in childbirth. Several sailors' tombstones have detailed relief carvings of ships in full sail. Other motifs are much more specific. An eleven-year-old boy who blew himself up while celebrating Guy Fawkes Night has Catherine wheels carved on his tombstone. Thomas Downes' tombstone is decorated with a hot air balloon. (Note: During an unsuccessful balloon launch the luckless Thomas was killed when a stanchion to which the balloon was tethered fell on him as the result of a riot by young people who were disappointed with the show. Downes was merely standing by at the time.) Major Mitchell, soldier, surveyor and poet, has a sword, a quill and a laurel wreath. Another soldier had a small cannon carved on the tombstone of his wife.

Among the sandstone monuments, two are unique in style in the cemetery. One is the badly damaged monument to the harpist, Nicholas Bochsa, surmounted by the mourning figure of a grieving woman and a bare tree trunk on which his harp hangs, its strings broken. John Roote Andrews provided his family with a memorial in the Scottish style, with a canopy supported on four small caryatids and decorated with the thistle and the flag of St Andrew. Another unique monument is that of John Ley, Foreman of Mort's Dock, which is the forged blade of a ship's propeller.

Because the majority of burials occurred within the Early Victorian period, there are few white marble monuments and none of the elaborate marble figures that are a feature of Late Victorian and Edwardian cemeteries.

=== Oddments ===
Some of the most prominent and remarkable features of the site are not tombs or gravestones but are an assortment of objects, mostly architectural, that have been saved from destruction and placed in the cemetery. These include a decorative water fountain with a Gothic arch, previously in Erskineville, placed in the cemetery as a memorial to E.W. Molesworth M.L.A. for 45-year Church Warden of St Stephen's. It is now a feature of countless wedding photos. Near it stands the detached pediment of a building with a carved ship ploughing through the waves; it originally was over the front entrance to the old Harbour Trust Building, Circular Quay (c. 1902) and was placed in the cemetery as a memorial to seamen after the second World War. Another such memorial is an anchor from Morts Dock attached to which was a chain from the S.S. Collaroy that ran aground on the beach now known by that name in 1881. The two large gateposts marking the entrance to the Dunbar Track are from the Devonshire Street Cemetery.

== Burials ==
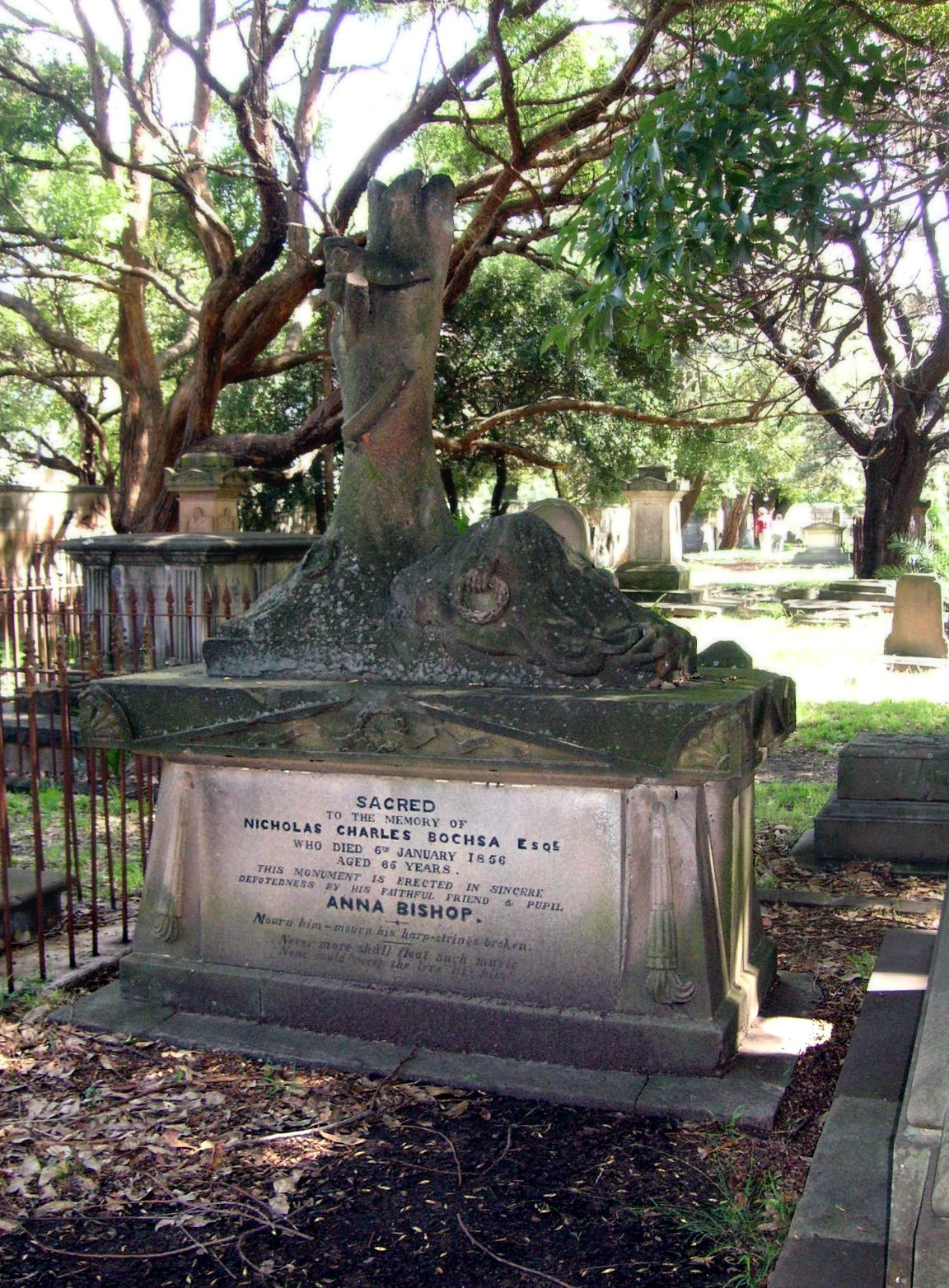
The Bochsa Monument

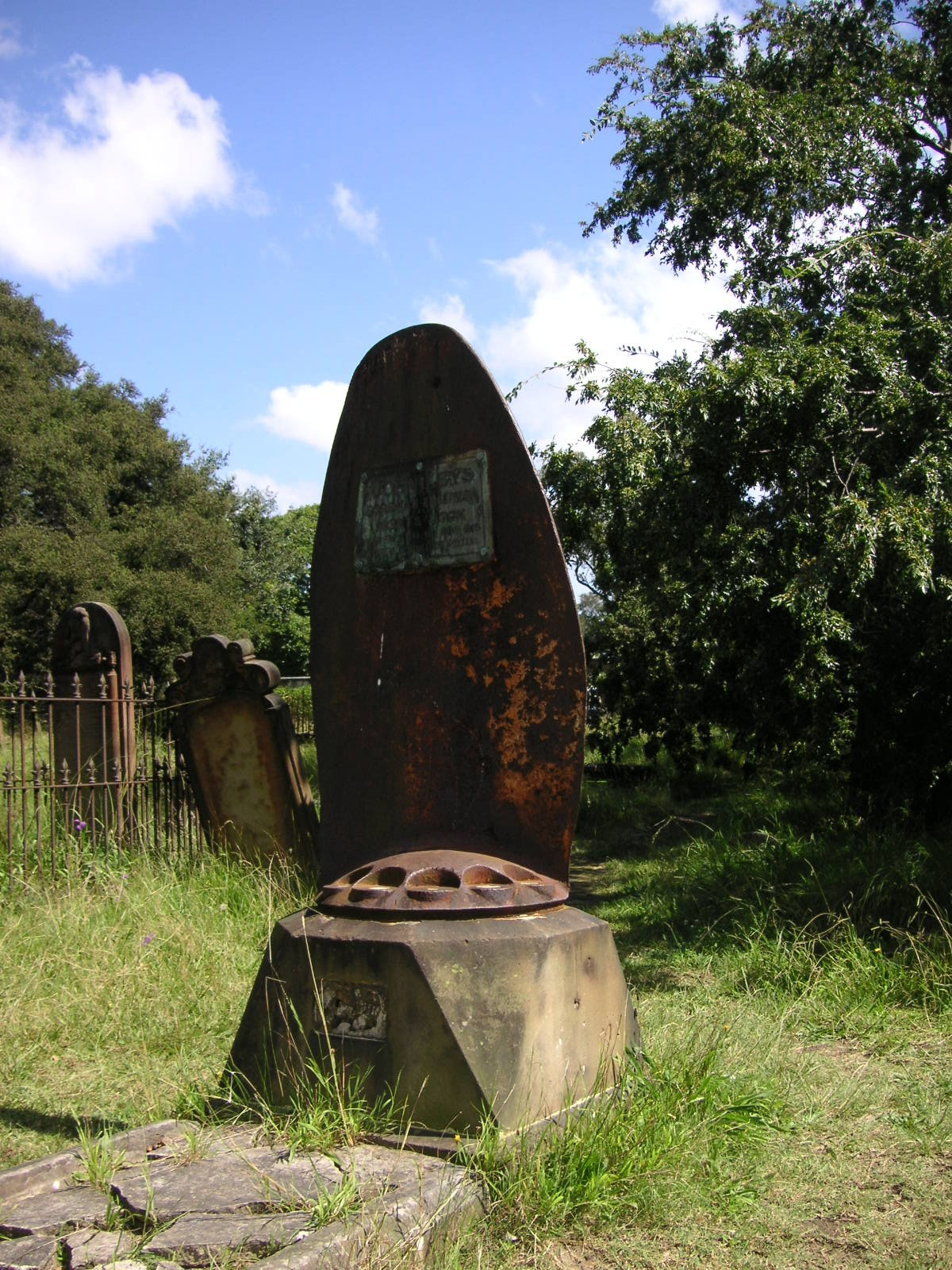
The unusual memorial of Foreman Leys

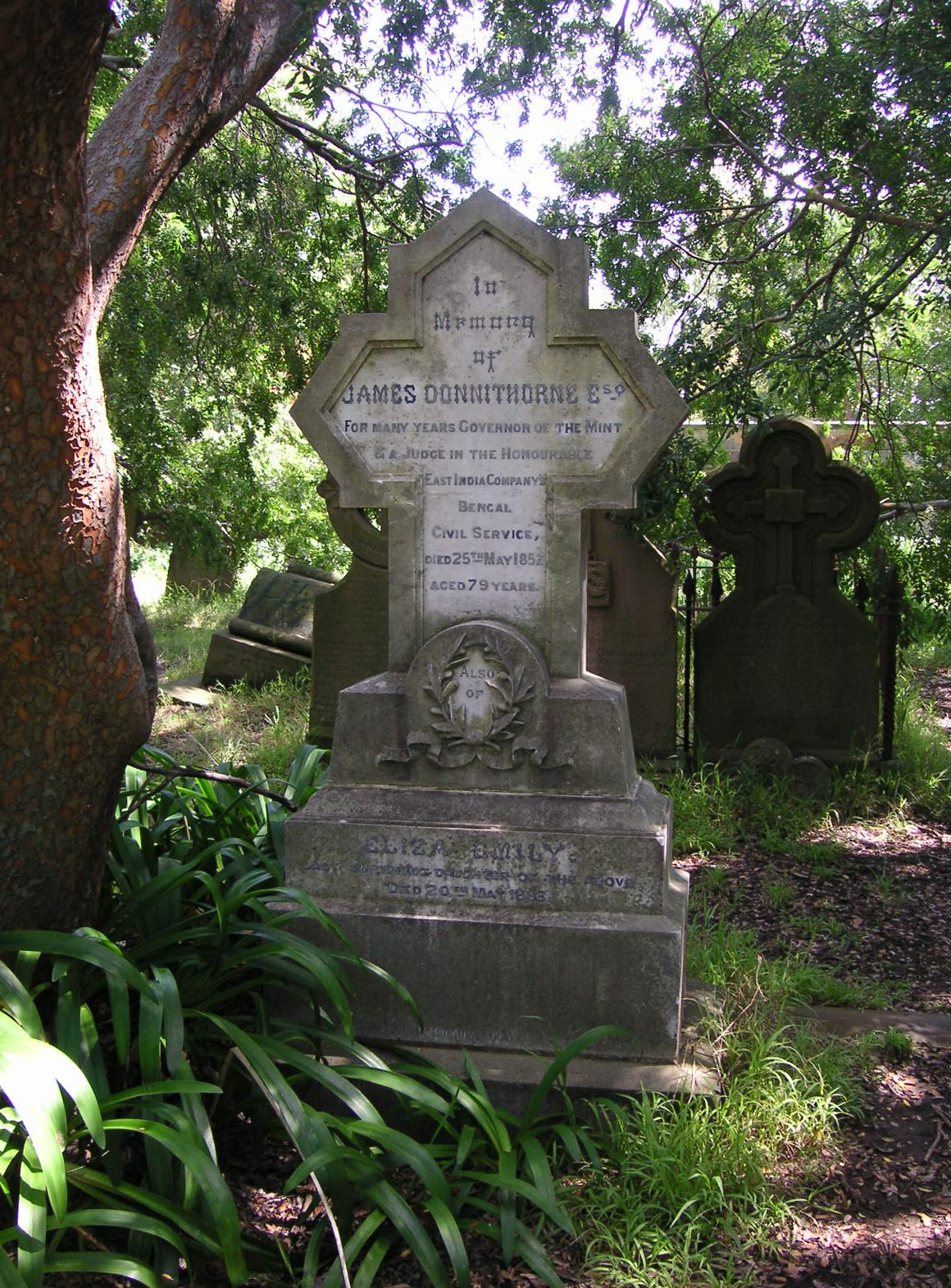
The marble cross of Judge Donnithorne and his daughter Eliza

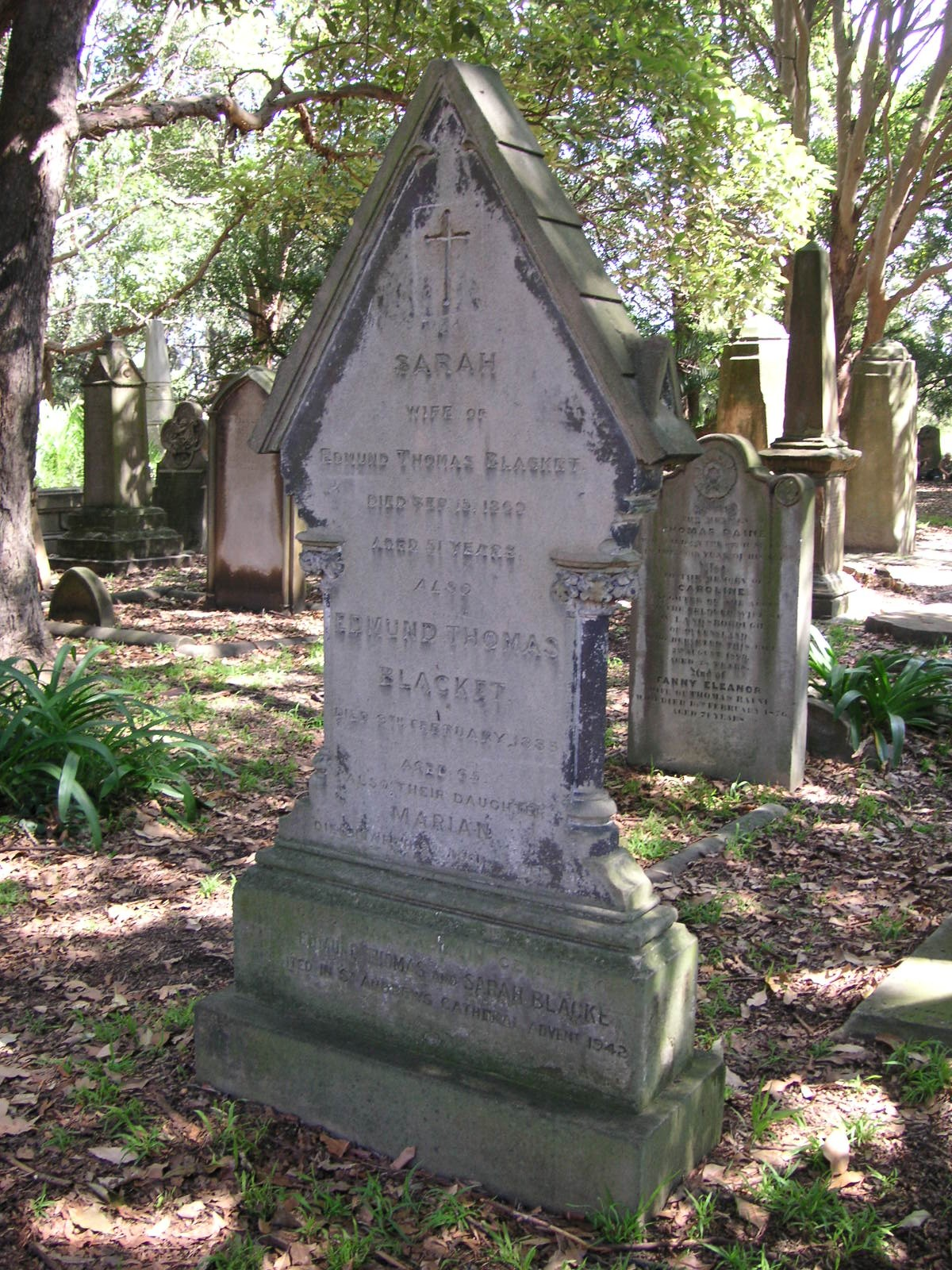
Gravestone designed by Edmund Blacket for his wife, Sarah

Note: Information in this list is drawn from T.G. Rees and/or Chrys Meader unless otherwise referenced.

Burials in Camperdown Cemetery include:

- Sir Maurice O'Connell, (d. 1848) Colonel of H.M. 80th Regiment, Lieutenant-Governor of New South Wales,
- Margaret (d. 1849) and John (d.1850) Manning. Both convicts, who met when they arrived on their respective transport ships in 1800 and 1801. They had six children together.
- Lieut. Colonel Sir Thomas Livingstone Mitchell, (1792–1855), surveyor to the Duke of Wellington, Surveyor-General of New South Wales. Explored and mapped New South Wales and much of Victoria.
- Major Edmund Lockyer, (1784–1860), explored parts of Queensland and founded Western Australia, 21 January 1827. A blue gum from Western Australia was planted in his memory.
- Isaac Nathan, (1790–1864), scholar and musician, composed and conducted Australia's first opera, Don Juan of Austria. Collected and published Aboriginal melodies.
- Dr. Charles Nathan (1816–1872) pioneered the use of anaesthetics in Australia.
- Bathsheba Ghost (d. 1868) convict and Second Matron of the Sydney General Hospital from 1852 to 1866. Her unusual round memorial is the top of one of the gateposts of the infirmary.
- William Moffit, (1798–1871), printer, stationer and entrepreneur.
- Captain Thomas Watson, (1795–1879), Harbourmaster of Port Jackson
- Elizabeth Thompson, (1758–1865), Australia's oldest inhabitant at the time of her death.
- Charles Windeyer, (1780–1855), The first Mayor to the new settlement of Sydney town, and magistrate.
- Enoch Fowler, founder of Camperdown Potteries.
- Nicolas-Charles Bochsa (1791–1856), harpist to Napoleon, and subject of one of the cemetery's more scandalous tales. He eloped from England with the operatic soprano Anna Bishop, wife of the composer Sir Henry Bishop, and toured in America before arriving in Australia, where they completed just one successful concert together before he unexpectedly died. Anna, still the wife of Sir Henry, raised in Bochsa's honour the most ornate monument in the cemetery, with a statue of herself weeping disconsolately. The mourning figure was later smashed.
- Sarah Broughton (d. 1849), wife of Bishop William Grant Broughton.
- John Roote Andrews, monumental mason and maker of many of the cemetery's monuments.
- Mary, Lady Jamison, the widow of the pioneer physician, landowner and constitutional reformer Sir John Jamison
- Joseph Fidden, boatman died 1856
- James Donnithorne (1773–1852), Judge of the East India Company.
- Eliza Emily Donnithorne (d. 1886) whose story is similar to, and may have inspired, the story of Miss Havisham in Charles Dickens' Great Expectations. Eliza Emily was jilted on her wedding day, and became a recluse, refusing to have the wedding feast removed from the table, and keeping the front door permanently ajar in case her absconding lover should return. (Note: Whether or not Eliza Emily Donnithorne's story provided the inspiration for Dickens has been the subject of speculation and research. It is possible that Mary Reibey, with whom Dickens communicated, may have told him the story. One of Dickens' sons was in Australia for a time and may have related the story. However, a similar case in England has been proposed as a source.)
- Tommy, William Perry, Mogo and Mandelina. Tommy, an 11-year-old Aboriginal boy who died of bronchitis in the Sydney Infirmary was the first recorded Christian burial of an Aboriginal person. (Note: While William Perry and Mogo have gravestones, Tommy and Mandelina do not. It is probable that Tommy, as a "pauper", shares his grave with a bushranger who was buried the same day, having been hanged at Darlinghurst. Mogo, a teenage boy from Queensland, was also executed. He went "walkabout" from a Queensland property, took up with "the wrong crowd" and was implicated as taking part in a murder. His grieving white family paid for a burial and tombstone. However, their agent did it on the cheap, arranging a palimpsest, (a stone that has been reused, having had the original name chiselled out.) Later a tree was planted in Mogo's memory but this is outside the present cemetery, on the southern edge of the park.) The four names are recorded on an obelisk which commemorates the "Rangers of New South Wales" and "the whole Aboriginal race". (Note: The name of Mandelina has been wrongly transcribed onto the monument from the scrolly hand in which the Burial Dockets are written. It appears in various publications as "Wandalina Caborigirel" but should be read "Mandelina (aborigine)".)
- Others important colonial families who have members buried in the cemetery are the Macleays and Dumaresqs, the Tooths and children of the Farmers retailing family.
- Among the memorials moved to Camperdown from other sites was that of Mary Reibey, which has disappeared, presumed stolen or destroyed.
- The tombstone of Edmund Blacket, architect of St Stephen's, and his wife Sarah was moved to Camperdown from Balmain Cemetery when that cemetery was resumed as park. Their ashes were placed in St. Andrew's Cathedral, Sydney.
- One of the most famous burials in the cemetery is that of the victims of the wreck of the Dunbar. This clipper ship went down off Sydney Heads on the night of 20–21 August 1857 after a voyage from England, with all but one of the 122 people aboard perishing. The wreck had a profound effect on the people of Sydney, because nearly all the passengers were Sydney residents returning home. A tomb contains the remains of 22 of those who died, along with the victims from the wreck of the Catherine Adamson which sank in the harbour two months later. The "Dunbar Memorial Service" is held in the cemetery in the August of each year.
- Near the main drive that passes by the church are four small matching tombstones with inscriptions recording the deaths of seven children of the York and Free families. These and many other tombstones reflect the high infant mortality of the 19th century. The burial dockets indicate that many children died of diphtheria and measles, with one measles outbreak resulting in the burials of up to twelve children a day. Strangely, to the modern reader, the major cause of death of infants below the age of two years is given as teething. It is now understood that these deaths resulted from the use of mercury-based teething powders.
- A memorial plaque placed near the drive reads:

In memory of the many humble, undistinguished, unknown, unremembered folk buried in this cemetery whose names are not written in the book of history, but are written in the book of life.

== Ghosts ==
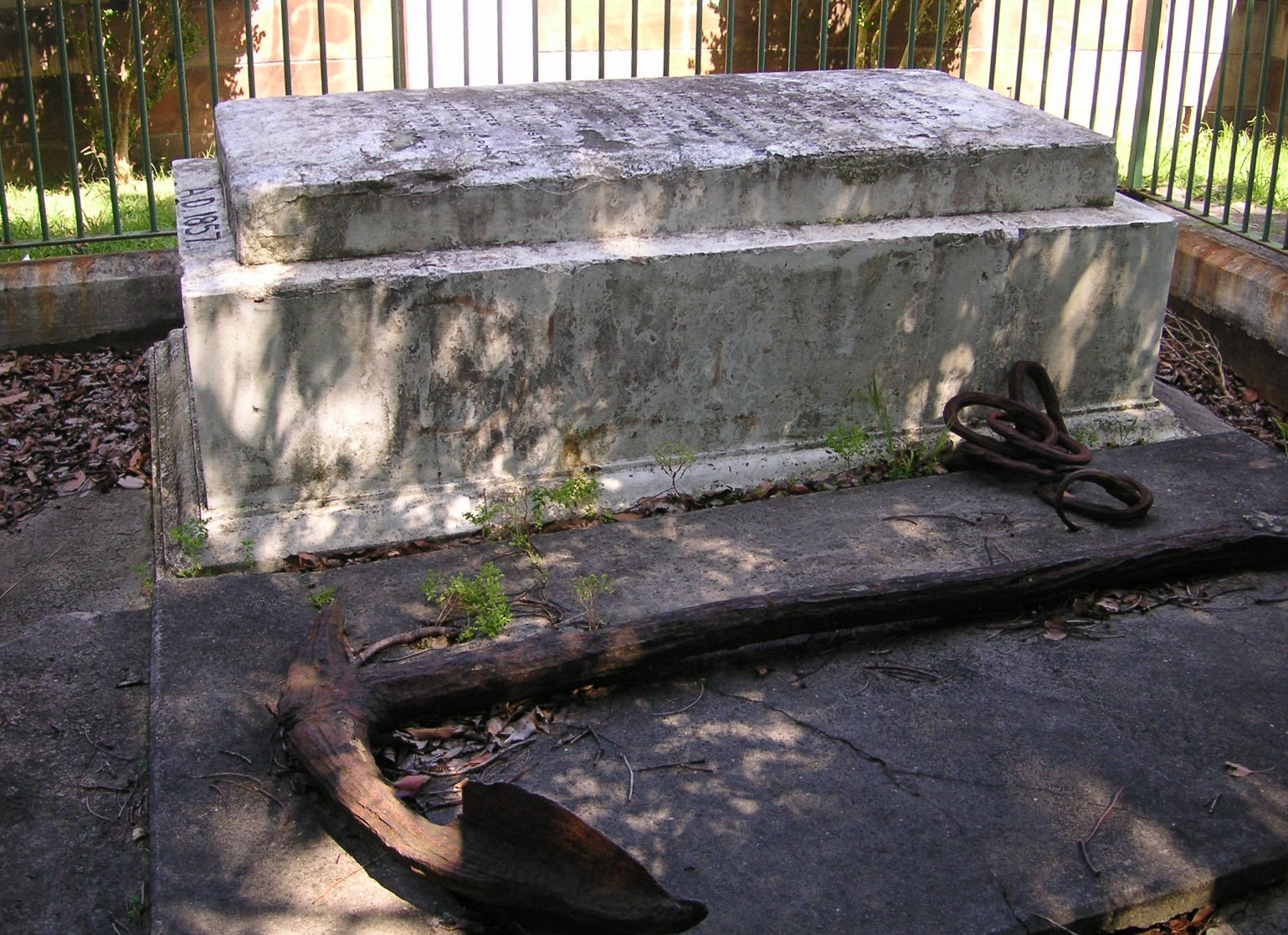
The Dunbar Tomb and anchor

- Camperdown Cemetery has one undisputed "ghost" as a permanent resident – Bathsheba Ghost, the second matron Matron of the Sydney General Hospital. However, there are those who claim that she is not simply a ghost in name alone, but has been seen attending the sick in St Stephen's Rectory.
- The most sensational ghost story, and one that developed rapidly in form from the time of its first telling in the mid 1990s, is the story of Hannah Watson and her lover. Hannah, the wife of Captain Thomas Watson, the Harbour Master of Port Jackson, according to the legend, was having an affair with Captain John Steane of the Royal Navy. Thomas Watson, on discovering his wife's infidelity, cursed the lovers. Hannah wrote to Steane, begging him not to return to Sydney, but it was too late. Hannah Watson died and was buried in the cemetery. John Steane outlived Hannah by only a few days. The ship in which he was returning to the arms of his beloved was the ill-fated Dunbar. John Steane's body was one of the few that were recovered intact. It is buried in a separate grave near the Dunbar Tomb, and only a few metres from the plot where Thomas Watson had recently buried his wife. It is claimed that Hannah Watson has been seen emerging from her tomb in the form of a ghostly grey lady. She is said to drift slowly to the grave of her erstwhile lover. Although the tale has been told many times, and has been used as the basis for a work of fiction, no investigation into the possibility of a love-affair between Hannah Watson and Captain John Steane has yet been made. John Steane's descendants continue to live in the vicinity of Newtown.

== Bibliography ==
- Gledhill, P.W., A Stroll through the Historic Camperdown Cemetery, NSW, Robert Dey, Son & Co. (1946)
- Meader, Chrys Beyond the boundary stone: a history of Camperdown Cemetery, Marrickville Council Library Services (1997), ISBN 0646342983
- Rees, Rev. T. G., Historic Camperdown, Pacey & Sons (undated, 1950s)
- Rees, Rev. T. G., The Wreck of the Dunbar, Pacey & Sons (undated, 1950s)
- Street, Philippa, Camperdown Cemetery Tree Survey, Marrickville Council (1992)
- Herman, Morton, The Blackets, an Era of Australian Architecture, Angus and Robertsons (1977) ISBN 0207134545
- Trustees of Camperdown Cemetery and others, Documents and Minutes, Camperdown Cemetery Trust, archives held by Camperdown Cemetery Trust, and Trustees. (1940s–2000)
- Various, Camperdown Cemetery Burial Dockets- 1848–1902, held by Anglican Archives, Diocese of Sydney
- M. Mackay, Joan Kerr, James Kerr, S. Jack, M. Stapleton, In Memoriam, The Historic Houses Trust of New South Wales (1981), ISBN 0949753017
