= Dirty Dick =

English merchant and eccentric (c. 1735–1809)

Coordinates: 51.5180°N 0.0796°W

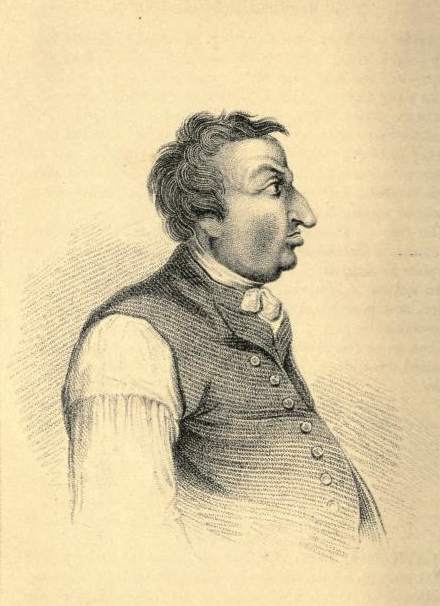
Nathaniel Bentley

Nathaniel Bentley (c. 1735 – 1809), commonly known as Dirty Dick, was an English merchant who was known for his filthy and unwashed appearance. He came from a moneyed background and received a good education. As a young man, he spoke several languages and dressed in a dandified manner, and was given the nickname "the beau of Leadenhall Street". He met Louis XVI of France and attended his coronation in June 1775; he was a patron of the London pleasure gardens at Ranelagh in Chelsea and Vauxhall in Kennington.

In his late thirties, Bentley became parsimonious and stopped washing and cleaning himself and his shop. He picked up the nickname Dirty Dick, and his shop became known as "the dirty warehouse". Both he and his shop became well known and were lampooned in the press. People visited the outlet to see the squalor and noted that Bentley was very polite and had impeccable manners. Rumours circulated that Bentley had not washed since his fiancée had died on their wedding eve and that he had locked the dining room, complete with the wedding feast, and left it to moulder.

Bentley moved out of his shop in 1804, and the contents were sold off. One enterprising publican purchased some of the contents, including mummified rats and cats, and used them to decorate his pub, which he renamed Dirty Dicks; as at 2026 the pub is still in operation under that name. Bentley died of a fever in 1809 in Haddington, East Lothian, in Scotland. Bentley's story was known by the writer Charles Dickens, and Bentley's locked dining room may have inspired the locked room of Miss Havisham in the 1861 novel Great Expectations.

== Biography ==
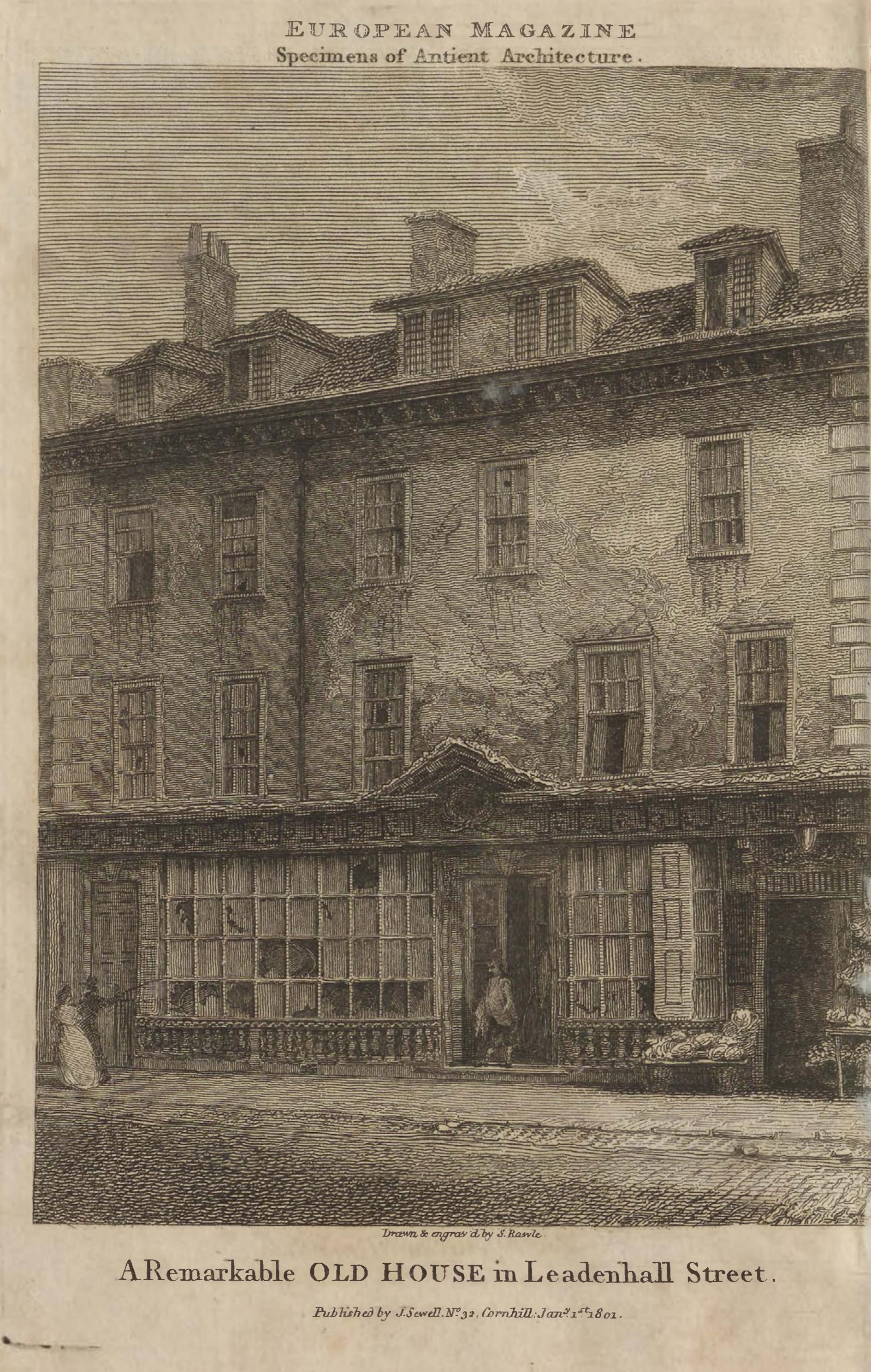
Exterior of the dirty warehouse in 1801

Nathaniel Bentley was born around 1735. There are no details known about his mother. His father, Thomas, was a successful merchant and shopkeeper in the City of London; the shop was a hardware outlet at 46 Leadenhall Street. At some date Thomas had donated a bell to his local Anglican church, St Katharine Cree; the bell was to be rung annually on his birthday. Bentley's mother died and Thomas married a wealthy woman. She was a member of the Dissenter religious movement and persuaded Thomas to also become a Nonconformist. Bentley had a sister, Sarah, who was born in around 1733; she married Andrew Lindegren, an importer of oregrounds iron, and had her portrait painted by Joseph Wright of Derby in 1762.

Bentley received a good education, spoke several languages and travelled Europe as a young man. In his younger years, he had a burgeoning reputation as a dandy with the nickname "the beau of Leadenhall Street" because of his stylish and immaculate dress and impeccable good manners. According to the historian Henry Wilson and publisher James Caulfield, writing in 1869, Thomas was a strict father and Bentley ran away from home for several years. When his father died in 1760 Bentley inherited a considerable fortune which included two shops.

Bentley travelled to Paris on several occasions. He was introduced to high society and in June 1775 attended the coronation of Louis XVI, whom he met; according to Philip Carter, Bentley's biographer in the Oxford Dictionary of National Biography, he "was identified as the best dressed and mannered English gentleman" at the French court. In addition to his business activities, Bentley was a patron of the London pleasure gardens at Ranelagh in Chelsea and Vauxhall in Kennington.

In his late thirties Bentley began to let his once-dandified appearance slide into slovenliness and then to sordidness. He gave up washing—although he did shave—and when a friend asked him about his filthy hands, Bentley responded "it's no use; if I wash my hands today, they will be dirty again tomorrow." He became parsimonious and lived off eighteen pence a day, cooking his own meals from cheap food. (Note: 18d equates to approximately £10.48 in 2025, according to calculations based on the Consumer Price Index measure of inflation.) He would wash and mend his own clothing, and wore it until it was too dilapidated to use. He had no household staff and just one man to assist him in the shop at 46 Leadenhall Street. The shop became increasingly filthy and acquired the nickname "the dirty warehouse". The windows became opaque with grime, and dust and dirt covered the goods and surfaces. Bentley was lampooned in verse in The European Magazine, which asked:

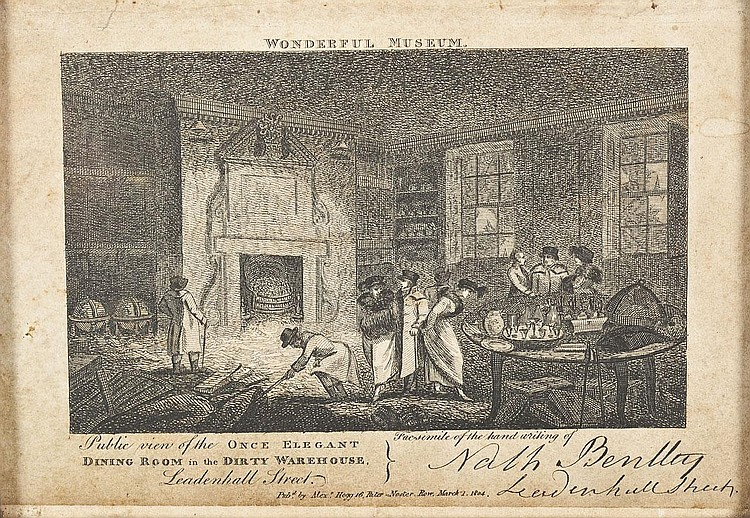
Visitors viewing the dirty warehouse after Bentley moved out

Thou art ('tis said) a very comely man,
Of polish'd language, partial to the fair,
Then why not wash thy face, and comb thy matted hair?

The warehouse and Bentley became an attraction for sightseers and customers; his politeness and impeccable manners remained throughout in his dealings with any visitors. There was speculation that the reason for the change in Bentley was because of the death of his fiancée on the eve of their wedding. Rumours circulated that the room of the wedding feast—including the food on the table—had been locked not to be opened again; another rumour was that Bentley slept in a coffin.

Bentley's lease on the Leadenhall Street property ended in February 1804 and he moved to Jewry Street in the Aldgate area of London. That March the stock from the shop was put up for auction. The dirty warehouse was taken over by W. Gostling, who sold a few remaining items from Bentley's stock; Gostling advertised in The Times that he would conduct tours around the property. Bentley lived in Jewry Street until 1807 and then spent a year living in Leonard Street, Shoreditch. Afterwards he became a tramp, travelling Britain and begging for money. He spent time at Musselburgh in Midlothian, Scotland, and then in the nearby town of Haddington. He died in the Crown Inn, Haddington, from fever in 1809 and was buried in a local church. At the time of his death Bentley had £400 to his name. (Note: £400 in 1809 is approximately equivalent to £27,930 in 2025, according to calculations based on the Consumer Price Index measure of inflation.)

== Legacy ==
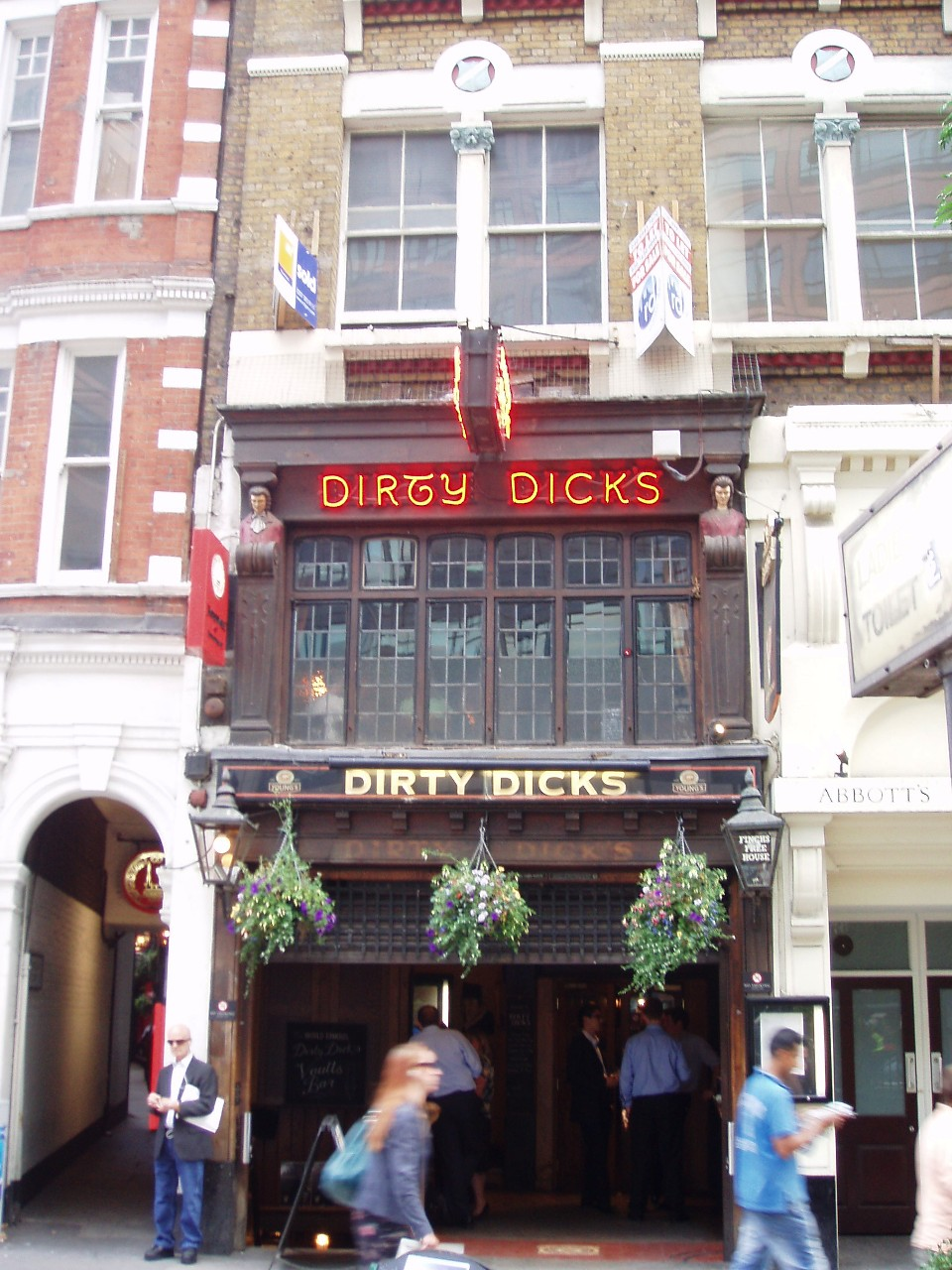
Dirty Dicks pub in Bishopsgate has existed for over 250 years.

Bentley's remaining goods were sold from the dirty warehouse to a publican with a premises in Bishopsgate that had been operating since 1745; these goods included mummified rats and cats that had been found. The publican used the goods to decorate his pub, which he renamed Dirty Dicks. The archaeologist Ivor Noël Hume questioned the validity of some of the objects that were displayed, as they included a mummified crocodile that was unlikely to have been living in Leadenhall Street. Much of the decoration was removed in the mid-1980s, although there were still mummified cats on view until at least 2008. As at 2026 the pub is owned by Young's brewery.

In 1853 an article about Bentley appeared in Household Words, a magazine edited by the writer Charles Dickens. In the article was the poem "In a dirty old house lived a Dirty Old Man", which described the warehouse and Bentley:

Within, there were carpets and cushions of dust,
The wood was half rot, and the metal half rust,
Old curtains, half cobwebs, hung grimly aloof;
'Twas a spiders' Elysium from cellar to roof.

There, king of the spiders, the Dirty Old Man
Lives busy and dirty as ever he can;
With dirt on his fingers and dirt on his face,
For the Dirty Old Man thinks the dirt no disgrace.

The Dickens scholars Russell Fraser and Stanley Friedman have separately put forward the theory that Dickens could have based the character of Miss Havisham on Bentley for his 1861 novel Great Expectations. Fraser sees a link between Bentley's locked dining room with the wedding feast and that of Miss Havisham:

"On this day of the year, long before you were born, this heap of decay", stabbing with her crutched stick at the pile of cobwebs on the table, but not touching it, "was brought here. It and I have worn away together. The mice have gnawed at it, and sharper teeth than teeth of mice have gnawed at me."

== Notes and references ==
=== Sources ===
==== Books ====
- Allingham, William (1860). Day and Night Songs; and the Music-Master: A Love Poem. London: Bell and Daldy. OCLC 645113276.
- Clayton, Antony (2008). The Folklore of London. London: Historical Publications. ISBN 978-1-9052-8628-7.
- Davies, Owen; Houlbrook, Ceri (2021). Building Magic: Ritual and Re-Enchantment in Post-Medieval Structures. Cham: Palgrave Macmillan. ISBN 978-3-0307-6765-5.
- Dickens, Charles (1861). Great Expectations. London: Chapman and Hall. OCLC 1160926239.
- Hume, Ivor Noel (2001). A Guide to Artifacts of Colonial America. Philadelphia, Pennsylvania: University of Pennsylvania Press. ISBN 978-0-8122-1771-1.
- McLaughlin, Terence (1971). Dirt: A Social History as seen Through the Uses and Abuses of Dirt. New York: Stein and Day. ISBN 978-0-8128-1412-5.
- Wilson, Derek A. (1983). Extraordinary People. London: Pan. ISBN 978-0-3302-8288-8.
- Wilson, Henry; Caulfield, James (2012) [1869]. "Nathaniel Bentley, The Well-known 'Dirty Dick'". The Book of Wonderful Characters: Memoirs and Anecdotes of Remarkable and Eccentric Persons in All Ages and Countries. Cambridge University Press. pp. 149–160. ISBN 978-1-1080-4440-0.

==== Journals, documents and magazines ====
- Barnes, Alan; Leach, Stephen (2017). "Not 'Mrs Andrew Lindington' but "Mrs Sarah Lindegren" by Joseph Wright of Derby (1734–1797)". The British Art Journal. 17 (3): 47–50. ISSN 1467-2006. JSTOR 26450249.
- Fraser, Russell (1955). "A Charles Dickens Original". Nineteenth-Century Fiction. 9 (4): 301–307. doi:10.2307/3044395. ISSN 0029-0564. JSTOR 3044395.
- Friedman, Stanley (Spring 1971). "Another Possible Source for Dickens' Miss Haversham". The Victorian Newsletter (39). New York University.
- "Ode to the Inhabitant of a Well Known Dirty Shop in Leadenhall Street". The European Magazine. Vol. 39. January 1801. p. 45.
- "The Dirty Old Man". Household Words. 6 (146). 8 January 1853.

==== Newspaper articles ====
- "Bentley's Effects, Leadenhall Street". The Times. 10 March 1804. p. 3.
- "Nathaniel Bentley, Esq". The Times. 20 April 1804. p. 1.

==== Websites ====
- Carter, Philip (2004). "Bentley, Nathaniel [nicknamed Dirty Dick]". Oxford Dictionary of National Biography (online ed.). Oxford University Press. doi:10.1093/ref:odnb/2168. (Subscription, Wikipedia Library access or UK public library membership required.)
- Clark, Gregory (2023). "The Annual RPI and Average Earnings for Britain, 1209 to Present (New Series)". MeasuringWorth. Archived from the original on 1 April 2023.
- "Our Pubs". Young & Co. Archived from the original on 10 April 2025.
