= Compeyson =

- Great Expectations character
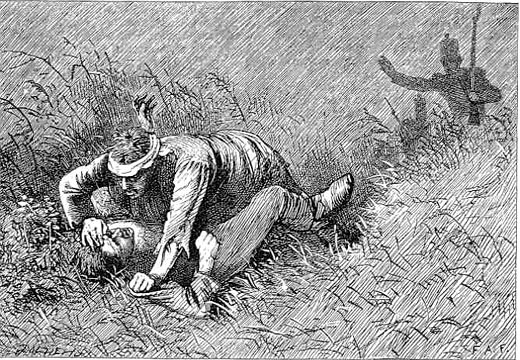
- Magwitch and Compeyson struggling, by F.A. Fraser, c. 1877
- Created by: Charles Dickens

In-universe information
- Nickname: Compey
- Gender: Male
- Occupation: forger, fraudster
- Significant other: Miss Havisham (former fiancée)
- Nationality: British

Compeyson is the main antagonist of Charles Dickens' 1861 novel Great Expectations, a 'George Wickham'-esque man, whose criminal activities harmed two people, who in turn shaped much of protagonist Pip's life.

Compeyson abandoned Miss Havisham at the altar, and later got Abel Magwitch arrested. After Magwitch returned to England, Compeyson died after drowning in the River Thames while fighting with Magwitch.

== Criminal career ==
Compeyson had a good education when he was a child. His appearance was attractive and his manners gentlemanly and smooth. As an adult, he made his living through forgery and financial schemes. One of his fellows in crime was Miss Havisham's half brother, known in the novel only by his forename, Arthur. They conspired against her, as she had inherited the greater part of their father's estate.

Compeyson seduced Miss Havisham and fooled her into thinking that he loved her and would marry her. Before the marriage, he got her to agree to buy the brewery Arthur inherited from their father. When the day of the marriage came, Compeyson left her a letter saying that he would not be present. This scarred Miss Havisham for life; she stopped her life at the moment she received that note. Clocks were not set, her clothes were never changed, the wedding meal was left in place at her home, Satis House. She adopted Estella, meaning to bring up the girl to "wreak revenge on all the male sex".

In a later crime, Compeyson involved Magwitch in a counterfeiting scheme. Both were arrested, but Compeyson arranged his story so that the most evidence of criminality fell to Magwitch, even though Compeyson had set up and run the whole scheme. At their trial, Compeyson insisted on separate defence, so his own lawyer could play up the contrast between the two men. Compeyson's appearance of gentility did not free him of prison time, but the judge and jury looked upon him more favourably, solely due to his social level compared to Magwitch, a boy with no parents, brought up by chance among lower-class people, and nearly always hungry.

Magwitch got fourteen years, whilst Compeyson received a sentence of seven years in jail. They were imprisoned in the same prison ship. Magwitch escaped on his own. Compeyson did not realise it was Magwitch who had gone when he escaped himself. When Magwitch learned from young Pip that a second convict was in the marshes and hearing a description, Magwitch pursued and attacked Compeyson. Again, Compeyson emphasised the contrast between himself and Magwitch and so the latter was tried again, earning the sentence of transportation for life, in Australia. Compeyson was released at the end of his term and returned to his same schemes and network of contacts. He knew that Magwitch left Australia and when he arrived in London, at which time he did two things: he spread false information of his own plans that Wemmick would hear and advise Pip and Herbert to act on as to when to take Magwitch out of England and he worked with the police, offering to identify Magwitch when they planned to pick him up by boat on his way out of England.

That sets up the last encounter between the two convicts. Magwitch leaps on Compeyson. The two boats are jostled by tides and two large steamers in the river, so the fight between them puts them in the water. Compeyson drowns, while Magwitch survives, although injured against a steamboat paddle in the scuffle.

Compeyson is absent for most of the novel and is not even named until Chapter 42, more than three quarters of the way through. Nonetheless, by having jilted Miss Havisham and then dragging Magwitch, as Estella's father, further into a life of crime, he affects the lives of multiple characters in the story, including Pip, and so becomes the antagonist in this novel.
