= Eliza Emily Donnithorne =

Australian hermit

Eliza Donnithorne
- Born: 8 July 1821; Cape Town, Cape Colony
- Died: 20 May 1886 (aged 64); Newtown, New South Wales
- Occupation: Recluse
- Parent(s): James Donnitorne, Sarah Elizabeth Donnithorne

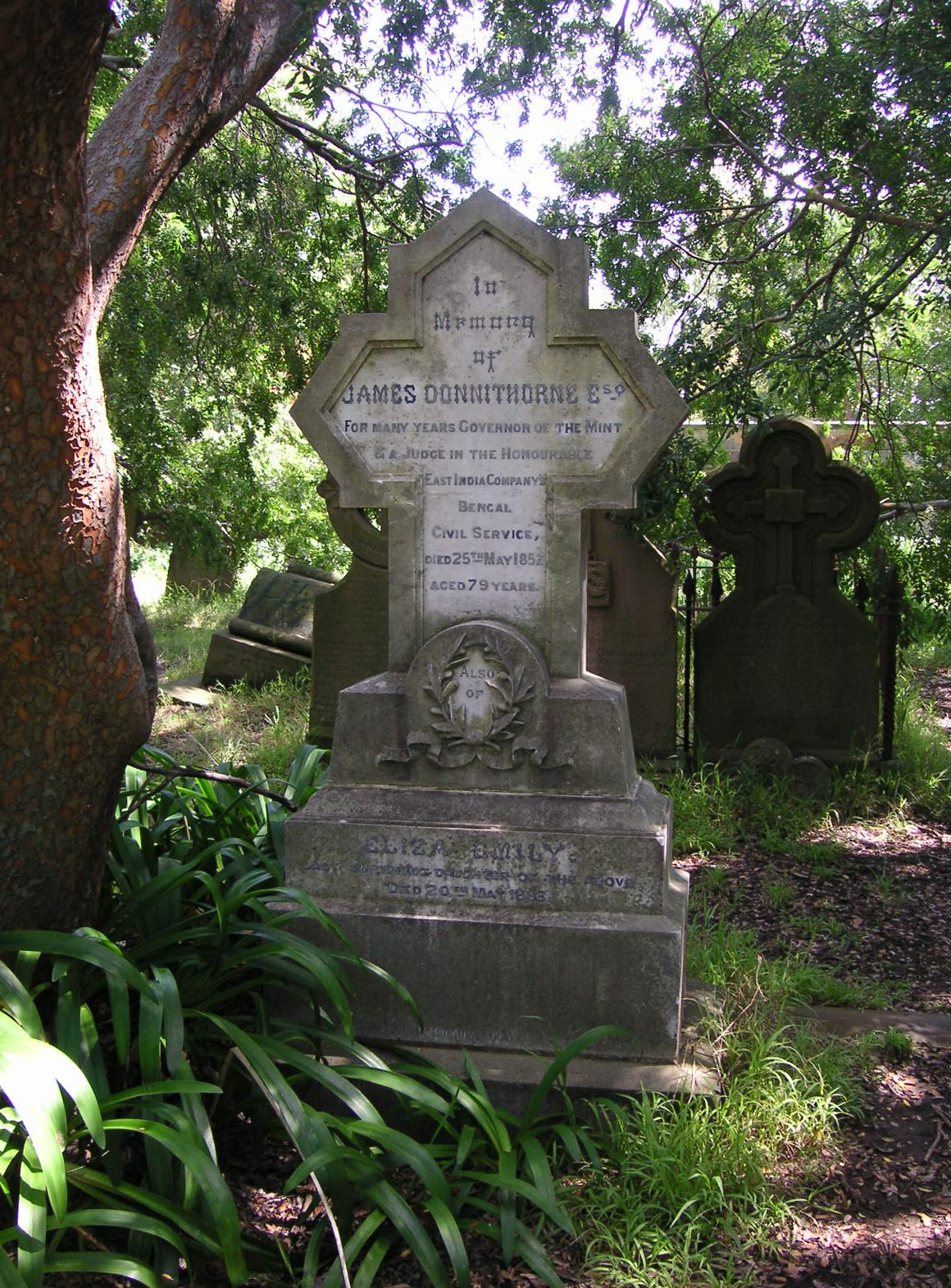
The gravestones of Eliza Donnithorne and her father James in Camperdown Cemetery, Newtown.

Eliza Emily Donnithorne (8 July 1821 – 20 May 1886) was an Australian woman best known as a possible inspiration for the character of Miss Havisham in Charles Dickens' 1861 novel Great Expectations.

== Biography ==
=== Early life ===
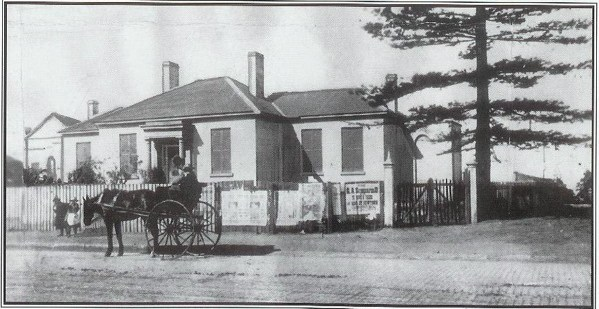
Cambridge Hall (known as Camperdown Lodge by the time this photo was taken), Eliza Donnithorne's Newtown home.

Eliza Donnithorne was born at the Cape of Good Hope, South Africa, and spent her early childhood in Calcutta where her father, James Donnithorne, worked for the East India Company as master of the mint and later as a judge. Her mother was Sarah Elizabeth Donnithorne, née Bampton. Sarah Donnithorne and the couple's two older daughters died during a cholera epidemic in the 1830s. In 1838, when Eliza was about 17 years old, her father retired and moved to Sydney. Eliza seems to have lived in England for some years with her brother and his wife, before joining her father in New South Wales in 1846. In Sydney they lived at Cambridge Hall (later known as Camperdown Lodge) at 36 King Street, Newtown. When her father died in May 1852, Eliza inherited most of his estate.

=== Broken engagement and later life ===
Although there are multiple versions of the story and historical evidence is scarce, most accounts of Donnithorne's life focus on a broken engagement when she was about 30 years old. Some sources name her fiancé as George Cuthbertson, a clerk with a shipping company. On the morning of the wedding, her fiancé did not arrive at Cambridge Hall for the wedding breakfast. The story goes that she ordered that the feast and decorations be left out, and spent the rest of her life as a recluse. Some versions say that she never took off her wedding dress.

A 1946 retelling captures the recurring details of the story:

The guests were assembled, and the wedding breakfast prepared. Eliza, clad in her bridal gown, awaited the arrival of the groom. He never came. She never heard from him again. When the guests had departed, Eliza pulled down the blinds of her house, and for 30 years remained a hermit. The front door was chained pemitting it to open only a few inches; callers never saw her, for when she was forced to speak to them, she remained out of sight. Here, for those long years, lived a woman in whom hope had died. When death at last came to Eliza, those who came to carry her to the greater peace of Camperdown Cemetery found her still clad in her bridal gown. Dust lay thick on the floor, and the window panes were thick with grime. And in the dining room, the wedding feast was uneaten, and the food had mouldered into dust.

=== Death and legacy ===
Donnithorne died in 1886 and was buried at St Stephen's Church in Newtown (now Camperdown Cemetery) alongside her father. Her grave remains one of the cemetery's most visited by tourists. When it was vandalised in 2004, the Australian National Trust and the UK Dickens Society contributed to the cost of its restoration.

== As inspiration for Miss Havisham ==
The claim that Eliza Donnithorne inspired the character of Miss Havisham in Great Expectations has been part of Australian literary lore since at least the last decades of the 19th century.

Charles Dickens never visited Australia, but he was interested in the Australian colonies and wrote frequently about them in his weekly journal, Household Words. There are several theories as to how he may have encountered the story of Eliza Donnithorne.

One 1935 newspaper report describes Donnithorne's father, James, as "a great friend of the famous writer", but offers no source for this statement.

Another theory suggests that the Sydney-based social reformer Caroline Chisholm, who met Dickens in England in 1850 and corresponded with him about the Australian colonies, may have told Dickens about Donnithorne. Chisholm's descriptions of life in New South Wales were published in Dickens' Household Words, and the character of Mrs Jellyby in Dickens' Bleak House was likely based in part on Chisholm. Chisholm would have had opportunity to hear about Donnithorne: she ran a school for girls in Newtown, near Donnithorne's home; Chisholm and her husband were part of the same small Sydney philanthropic circle as Donnithorne's father; and Chisholm and Eliza Donnithorne were at one point treated by the same Sydney doctor.

Some versions of the story speculate that Dickens' sons, two of whom spent time in Australia, told the story to their father. However, they arrived in Australia after Great Expectations was published.

Other historians propose an alternative explanation: that Dickens did not base Miss Havisham on Donnithorne, but that Sydney readers drew the connection when Great Expectations was published in 1861, and over time embellished Donnithorne's story with details borrowed from Dickens' book. This is the tentative conclusion reached by Evelyn Juers in her 2012 book The Recluse, the most thorough recent investigation of the story.

== In popular culture and the arts ==
Opera: Miss Donnithorne's Maggot is a 1974 operatic work, with music by Peter Maxwell Davies and text by Randolph Stow.

Literature: Eliza Donnithorne features in the 1987 children's novel I Am Susannah by Libby Gleeson (Angus & Robertson).

Literature: Lost Expectations-The story of the real Miss Haversham by Alan Wardrope (New Holland Publishers (Australia) Pty Ltd) is a 2011 biographic novel depicting the life and times of Eliza Emily Donnithorne.

Street Art: A mural on the house at the Lennox Street exit of the IGA Supermarket in Newtown purportedly depicts Elize Donnithorne

== Bibliography ==
- Juers, Evelyn. The Recluse. Sydney: Giramondo, 2012.
- Ryan, J.S. ‘A Possible Australian Source for Miss Havisham’, Australian Literary Studies, vol 1, no 2, Dec 1963, pp 134–36.
- Wardrope, Alan. Lost Expectations: The Story of the Real Miss Havisham. Chatswood, NSW: New Holland, 2011.

== See also ==
- Miss Havisham
- Great Expectations
