= Miss Havisham =

Fictional character in Charles Dickens's Great Expectations

- Great Expectations character
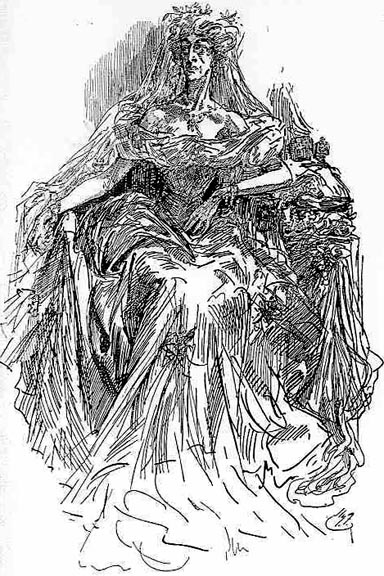
- Miss Havisham, by Harry Furniss
- Created by: Charles Dickens
- Based on: Possibly Eliza Emily Donnithorne or Margaret Catherine Dick
- Portrayed by: Gillian Anderson; Anne Bancroft; Helena Bonham Carter; Joan Hickson; Martita Hunt; Margaret Leighton; Tuppence Middleton; Charlotte Rampling; Maxine Audley; Florence Reed; Jean Simmons; Tabu; Olivia Colman

In-universe information
- Gender: Female
- Occupation: None; heiress
- Family: Arthur Havisham (half brother)
- Significant other: Compeyson (former fiancé)
- Children: Estella (adoptive daughter)
- Relatives: Pocket family (cousins); Cousin Raymond; Georgiana; Camilla; Bentley Drummle (son-in-law)
- Religion: Church of England
- Nationality: English

Miss Havisham is a character in Charles Dickens's 1861 novel Great Expectations. She is a wealthy spinster, once jilted at the altar, who insists on wearing her wedding dress for the rest of her life. She lives in a ruined mansion with her adopted daughter, Estella. Dickens describes her as looking like "the witch of the place". In the novel, she schemes to have the young orphan, Pip, fall in love with Estella, so that Estella can "break his heart".

Although she has often been portrayed in film versions as very elderly, Dickens's own notes indicate that she is only in her mid-thirties at the start of the novel. However, it is indicated in the novel that her long seclusion without sunlight has aged her. She is one of the most gothic characters in the work of Dickens.

== Character history ==
Miss Havisham's father was a wealthy brewer and her mother died shortly after she was born. Her father had a son, Arthur, with the household cook, whom he later married. Miss Havisham's relationship with her half-brother was a strained one. She inherited most of her father's fortune and fell in love with a man named Compeyson, who conspired with the jealous Arthur to swindle her of her riches. Her cousin, Matthew Pocket, warned her to be careful, but she was too much in love to listen. On the wedding day, while she was dressing, Miss Havisham received a letter from Compeyson and realised he had defrauded her and she had been left at the altar.

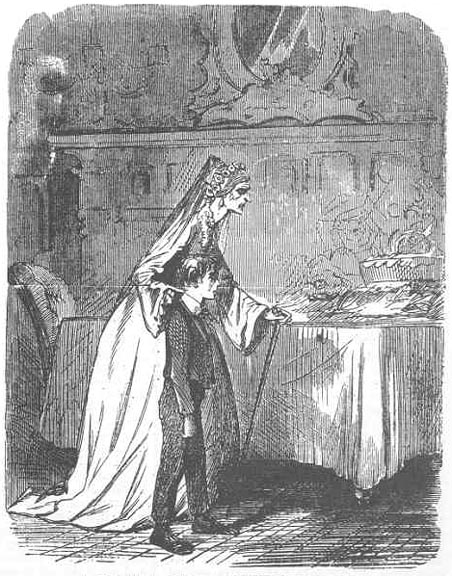
"It's a great cake. A bride-cake. Mine!" – Miss Havisham

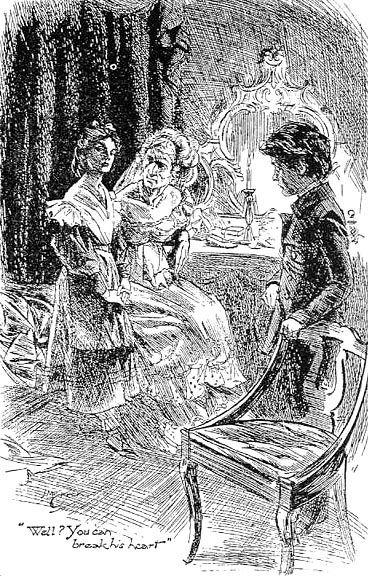
Miss Havisham with Estella and Pip (H. M. Brock)

Humiliated and heartbroken, Miss Havisham suffered a mental breakdown and remained alone in her decaying mansion Satis House – never removing her wedding dress, wearing only one shoe, leaving the wedding breakfast and cake uneaten on the table, and allowing only a few people to see her. She also had the clocks in her mansion stopped at twenty minutes to nine: the exact time when she had received Compeyson's letter.

Time passed and Miss Havisham had her lawyer, Mr. Jaggers, adopt a daughter for her.

I had been shut up in these rooms a long time (I don't know how long; you know what time the clocks keep here), when I told him that I wanted a little girl to rear and love, and save from my fate. I had first seen him when I sent for him to lay this place waste for me; having read of him in the newspapers, before I and the world parted. He told me that he would look about him for such an orphan child. One night he brought her here asleep, and I called her Estella. (Chapter XLIX)

=== From protection to revenge ===
While Miss Havisham's original goal was to prevent Estella from suffering as she had at the hands of a man, it changed as Estella grew older:

Believe this: when she first came, I meant to save her from misery like my own. At first I meant no more. But as she grew, and promised to be very beautiful, I gradually did worse, and with my praises, and with my jewels, and with my teachings, and with this figure of myself always before her a warning to back and point my lessons, I stole her heart away and put ice in its place. (Chapter XLIX)

While Estella was still a child, Miss Havisham began searching for boys who could be a testing ground for Estella's education in breaking the hearts of men as vicarious revenge for Miss Havisham's pain. Pip, the narrator, is the eventual victim; and Miss Havisham readily dresses Estella in jewels to enhance her beauty and to exemplify all the more the vast social gulf between her and Pip. When, as a young adult, Estella leaves for France to receive education, Miss Havisham eagerly asks him, "Do you feel you have lost her?"

=== Repentance and death ===
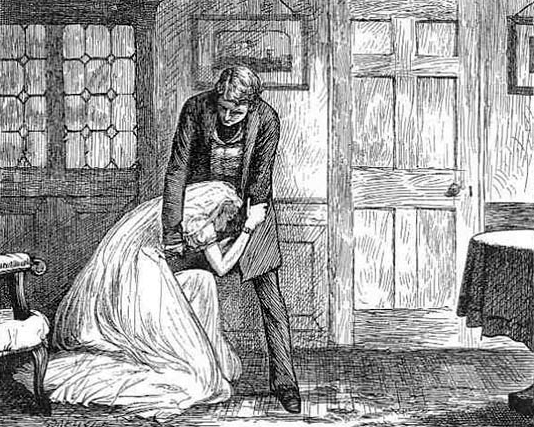
Miss Havisham is begging Pip for his forgiveness (F. A. Fraser)

Miss Havisham repents late in the novel when Estella leaves to marry Pip's rival, Bentley Drummle; and she realises that she has caused Pip's heart to be broken in the same manner as her own; rather than achieving any kind of personal revenge, she has only caused more pain. Miss Havisham begs Pip for forgiveness.

Until you spoke to [Estella] the other day, and until I saw in you a looking-glass that showed me what I once felt myself, I did not know what I had done. What have I done! What have I done! (Chapter XLIX)

After Pip leaves, Miss Havisham's dress catches on fire from her fireplace. Pip rushes back in and saves her. However, she has suffered severe burns to the front of her torso (she is laid on her back), up to the throat. Her final words in the novel are spoken to Pip in a delirium. Referring both to Estella and to a note Miss Havisham has given Pip bearing her signature, she says: “Take the pencil and write under my name, 'I forgive her!''"

A surgeon dresses her burns, and says that they are "far from hopeless". However, despite rallying for a time, she dies a few weeks later, leaving Estella as her chief beneficiary, and a considerable sum to Herbert Pocket's father, as a result of Pip's reference.

== Historical inspirations ==
In the 1850s, Eliza Emily Donnithorne of Newtown, Sydney (then part of the Colony of New South Wales), was jilted by her groom on her wedding day and spent the rest of her life alone in a darkened house, her wedding breakfast left to rot, and with a chained front door. Donnithorne was widely considered at the time to be Dickens's model for Miss Havisham, although this cannot be proven.

Another contemporary inspiration might have been Margaret Catherine Dick of Bonchurch, Isle of Wight, who lived at "Uppermount" house and was the daughter of Captain Samuel Dick. Dickens spent the summer of 1849 staying in Bonchurch writing chapters of David Copperfield; during his time in the coastal village he took regular walks up St Boniface Down with Charles George Dick, the brother of Margaret. The character of Mr Dick (who boarded with Miss Betsy Trotwood) in David Copperfield is based on Charles. In 1860 Margaret Dick was jilted at the altar and began living a reclusive life. In the 1860s, Dickens's daughters stayed with the vicar in Bonchurch that was to marry Margaret Dick. Dickens may have based the character of Miss Havisham on Margaret Dick; but named her after her neighbour Miss Haviland.

Another inspiration may have been the London merchant Nathaniel Bentley. Known as "Dirty Dick", Bentley never washed himself or cleaned his premises, and was rumored to have been jilted on his wedding day and to have locked up the dining room, leaving the meal to rot.

In the introduction to the 1965 Penguin edition of Great Expectations, writer Angus Calder notes that "James Payn, a minor novelist, claimed to have given Dickens the idea for Miss Havisham – from a living original of his acquaintance. He declared that Dickens's account was 'not one whit exaggerated'." Dickens reportedly encountered a wealthy recluse called Elizabeth Parker while staying in Newport, Shropshire, which has an aptly named Havisham Court. However, research by the Newport History Society has found no evidence to support the stories that Dickens ever stayed in Newport, met Miss Parker, or was an inspiration for Miss Havisham. Despite the reports Miss Parker (born 1802) spent the rest of her life as a recluse, census records of the period show she was at Chester (1851), then Whitchurch (1861), before moving to Chetwynd House, Newport in 1863. She was not even living in Newport when Dickens started to write Great Expectations in 1859.

Since the publication of Great Expectations, the character of Miss Havisham has seen numerous comparisons and parallels with many real jilted brides (life imitating art), such as the widely reported case of Alice Pinard-Dôges in Neuilly, France, who committed suicide in her bridal gown in 1894.

== Alternative and derived versions ==
Miss Havisham's Fire (1979, revised 2001) is an opera composed by Dominick Argento with a libretto by John Olon-Scrymgeour, based on Dickens's character. The entire story is told in flashback during an inquiry into Miss Havisham's death. The opera gives her first name as "Aurelia".

Ronald Frame's 2013 novel Havisham is a non-canonical story about Miss Havisham's early life. The story tells how Miss Havisham (given the name of Catherine) is the daughter of a brewer. The story tells of more than just the infamous trauma of being left behind by her fiancé and goes on with her taking charge of her family's business before descending into vengeful madness, adopting Estella, and arranging the meeting of Estella and Pip.

Terry Pratchett's novel Reaper Man references Miss Havisham with the character of Miss Flitworth, who was apparently jilted by her fiancé on her wedding day. Miss Flitworth says that while her neighbors expected her to mope about the place in a wedding dress for the rest of her life, she did not want to waste food and so had the wedding breakfast and got on with living the rest of her life.

In Jasper Fforde's Nextian Universe, Miss Havisham is a Jurisfiction agent, and the mentor of Thursday Next.

Both Sunset Boulevard and What Ever Happened to Baby Jane? were inspired by David Lean's adaptation of Great Expectations, as were, by extension, the characters of Norma Desmond and Baby Jane Hudson, and their homes.

== In film and television ==
In various film and television adaptations of Great Expectations, the character of Miss Havisham has been played by a number of actors, including:

- Grace Barton (1917)
- Marie Dinesen (1922)
- Florence Reed (1934)
- Martita Hunt (1946)
- Estelle Winwood (1954)
- Marjory Hawtrey (1959)
- Maxine Audley (1967)
- Margaret Leighton (1974)
- Joan Hickson (1981)
- Jill Forster (1987)
- Jean Simmons (1989)
- Anne Bancroft (1998, renamed to Nora Dinsmoor)
- Charlotte Rampling (1999)
- Gillian Anderson (2011)
- Helena Bonham Carter (2012)
- Tuppence Middleton (2015, renamed to Amelia Havisham)
- Tabu (2016, renamed to Begum Hazrat)
- Olivia Colman (2023, renamed to Amelia Havisham)

== In science ==
The condition of the "Miss Havisham effect" has been coined by scientists to describe a person who suffers a painful longing for lost love, which can become a physically addictive pleasure by activation of reward and pleasure centres in the brain, which have been identified to regulate addictive behaviour – regions commonly known to be responsible for craving and drug, alcohol and gambling addiction.

== See also ==
- Boo Radley
