= Abel Magwitch =

- Great Expectations character
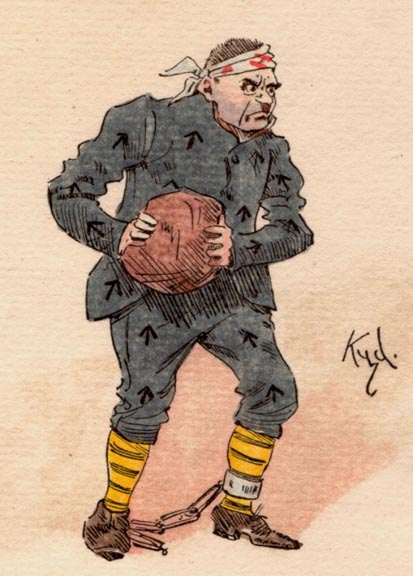
- Abel Magwitch by 'Kyd' (c.1900)
- Created by: Charles Dickens
- Based on: Charles Barrow (partially)

In-universe information
- Aliases: Provis, Campbell
- Occupation: Labourer, wagoner, haymaker, hawker, petty criminal (poaching, fraud), then a successful farmer
- Significant other: Molly
- Children: Estella
- Nationality: English

Abel Magwitch is a major fictional character from Charles Dickens' 1861 novel Great Expectations.

== Synopsis ==
Charles Dickens set his story in the early 19th century, setting his character Abel Magwitch to meet a man called Compeyson at the Epsom Races. Compeyson, Dickens wrote, had been brought up in a boarding school and was an attractive, charming gentleman. Magwitch, at the same time, began a relationship with a mentally unstable woman named Molly, who later stood trial for murder. Jaggers, her defence lawyer, convinced the jury that she was too weak to have strangled the woman. Molly was acquitted and became (unknown to Magwitch) Jaggers' maidservant.

The story relates that Molly had given birth to Magwitch's daughter, who was about two or three years old at the time of Molly's trial. Molly told Magwitch that she had killed the child, and as far as Magwitch knew, his daughter had indeed died.

Later in the novel Magwitch and Compeyson are accused of putting stolen notes in circulation. Compeyson convinces Magwitch that they should have separate defences and no communication. At the trial, Compeyson appeared like a gentleman, while Magwitch had to sell his clothes to be able to pay for Jaggers. The prosecution placed most of the guilt on Magwitch, who realized that Compeyson had always intended to scapegoat him should they be caught.

Dickens has Compeyson's attorney hammer the point home:

My lord and gentleman, here you has afore you, side by side, two persons as your eyes can separate wide; one, the younger, well brought up, who will be spoke to as such; one, the older, ill brought up, who will be spoke to as such; one, the younger, seldom if ever seen in these here transactions, and only suspected; t'other, the elder, always seen in ‘em and always with his guilt brought home. Can you doubt, if there is but one in it, which is the one, and if there is two in it, which is much the worst one?

In the end, Magwitch is condemned to fourteen years' imprisonment, while Compeyson receives seven. Magwitch and Compeyson are imprisoned on the same prison ship. Magwitch attempts to kill Compeyson. He is taken to the black hole (a solitary confinement cell) after landing his first punch, but he manages to escape some time around Christmas of 1812.

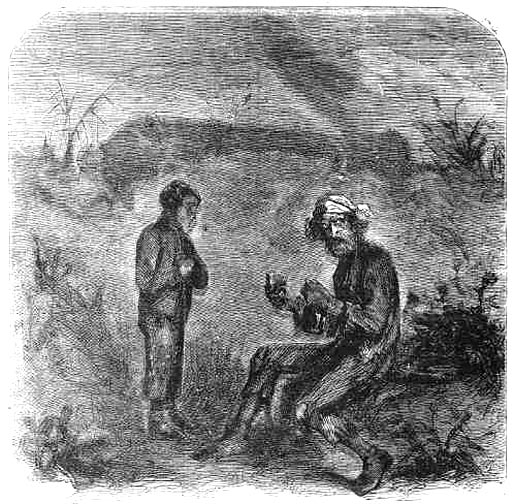
Pip and Magwitch on the marshes (John McLenan, 1860)

The novel begins with young Pip visiting the graves of his parents and brothers, where he is surprised by Magwitch: "[a] fearful man, all in coarse gray, with a great iron on his leg. A man with no hat, and with broken shoes, and with an old rag tied round his head. A man who had been soaked in water, and smothered in mud, and lamed by stones, and cut by flints, and stung by nettles, and torn by briars; who limped and shivered, and glared and growled; and whose teeth chattered in his head as he seized me by the chin."

Magwitch tricks the seven-year-old boy into believing that he has an accomplice who is a terrible young man who would tear out and eat Pip's heart and liver if Pip did not help them. Magwitch demands Pip to get him "wittles" (victuals, food) and a file. Pip, terrified, steals a pork pie, brandy and a file from his house and brings them to Magwitch the next morning. On his way, he encounters another convict, bruised in the face, whom he initially thought was Magwitch and then believes to be the young man Magwitch had told him about. Magwitch, upon hearing about the other escapee, realizes that Compeyson has also escaped and, after having eaten, drunk, and filed his leg iron off, he sets off to search for him. He finds him and decides, not caring for his own fate, to take him back to the Hulks. The pair are still struggling when soldiers find and seize them.

Compeyson argued that his escape was due to being terrorized by Magwitch. Consequently, his punishment was light, whereas Magwitch was put in irons, retried, and deported to New South Wales for life. Magwitch had a number of jobs in Australia, including that of a sheep farmer and stock breeder, and became rich. He never forgot Pip's kindness to him and decided to do something for the boy, in part because he reminded him of his lost daughter, who would have been about the same age as Pip. Magwitch sent money to Mr. Jaggers, who passed it to Pip and sought to make the boy a gentleman. Jaggers is not permitted to let Pip know who his benefactor is unless Magwitch chooses to reveal himself as the benefactor to Pip.

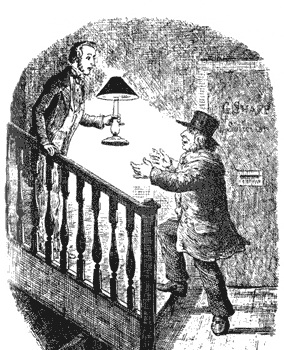
Magwitch makes himself known to Pip

Dickens continues his tale in about 1829, when Pip is 23 years old, Magwitch secretly returns to England under the name of "Provis". When he reveals himself to Pip, both are disappointed. Pip does not feel gratitude towards Magwitch but rather disgust and repulsion as he discovers where his money came from (partly because he had thought Miss Havisham had been assisting him in wooing her protegee Estella) and his feelings are thinly veiled. However, Pip's feelings towards Magwitch improve as he learns the convict's history. He decides nonetheless that he does not want to accept more money from Provis, despite the fact he is being hounded by debt collectors.

Magwitch, as a deported criminal, would be without doubt sentenced to death if recognized by the authorities. Wemmick and Herbert (during one of Pip's stays at the country) discover that they are being watched and lodge Magwitch (who is to go by the name of Mr. Campbell) in the house of Herbert's fiancée. An escape for Magwitch from England is prepared. Magwitch is to be put aboard a steamer bound for Hamburg. As it is not possible to board at a port due to Magwitch's wanted status, they try to row to the steamer from the banks of the Thames in Kent after the steamer has left the port of London. Unusually, a well-manned boat comes out to intercept them as they aim for the steamer. Magwitch recognizes Compeyson on this boat and goes for him. They both end up in the water where Compeyson is drowned. Magwitch is immediately arrested and clapped in irons, having suffered a serious chest wound during these events.

Pip now considers Magwitch a friend. He makes frequent visits to the ailing Magwitch and holds his hand throughout Magwitch's new trial, where Magwitch receives a death sentence. (This conviction for felony also causes the forfeiture of all his money, thus destroying Pip's great expectations.) Magwitch is declining in health and is being held in the infirmary when Pip at last tells him that his child, Estella, is alive. Pip goes on to tell him that she is a beautiful lady and that he, Pip, was in love with her. Pip has found this information out, as Wemmick told him Molly's story and he recognized her to be Estella's mother. With a last pressure on Pip's hand, Magwitch dies a good and very content man.

== Biographical note ==
Charles Barrow, Charles Dickens' maternal grandfather, had been the Head of the Moneys Section at the Navy Pay Office. In 1810 it was found that he had been systematically falsifying his accounts for nine years. During this period he had embezzled nearly £6,000. Threatened with legal proceedings Charles Barrow fled abroad, eventually dying on the Isle of Man, outside English legal jurisdiction, in 1826, when Dickens was fourteen years old. Legal outlawry must have produced some cloaked, mysterious references to his absent maternal grandfather. Flight overseas for suspected felons, bankrupts and indeed any persons visited with moral or social disgrace, was a commonplace of Victorian life and fiction. But two situations are always charged with heightened atmosphere in Dickens' novels. The first is the menace that forever surrounds the lives of the respectable from the very existence of a criminal friend or relative at large – this is the fate of Mrs Rudge, the dark secret of David Copperfield's aunt, Betsy Trotwood, the strange tension of Mrs Clennam's tomb-like home in Little Dorrit, the central situation of Great Expectations. The other is the extraordinary vividness of foiled attempts by criminals to get away from England's shores.

The dramatic police interception of the illegally returned transported convict Magwitch's attempt to get to the Continent and to liberty, is one of the prime examples of this situation. (The other is the 'Anwerks package' scene in Martin Chuzzlewit when Jonas Chuzzlewit, the murderer, is turned back as he boards ship for the Low Countries.) These scenes have a detail of circumstance and a power of apprehension that suggests the feeding of fiction by an often told family story.

In 1816, Charles Dickens' father, John Dickens, had been appointed to one of the principal naval dockyards in Chatham at the mouth of the River Medway in Kent, 30 miles southeast of London. With his father, accompanying him in the course of his duty into the dockyard or on sailing trips up the River Medway, Dickens must have first seen the convicts who worked at unloading, and the marshes at Cooling, northeast of Chatham, off which the galley ships lay – scenes which would play a part in the story of his fictional self, Pip, and Pip's benefactor, Magwitch.

Dickens visited Portsmouth in the late 1850s to look for his birthplace. He is said to have been unsuccessful. However, the 1861 census (£) lists a "Pheeary Madgwick" living next door to Dickens' childhood home (the address then was 393 Commercial Road). Madgwick was cook to the Baker family, who ran a grocery business in the city. He is recorded as being 24 years old, unmarried and born in Midhurst, Sussex. There is a possibility that Madgwick produced a good meal for Dickens and was honoured with the namesake character Magwitch.

== Portrayals ==
Actors who have portrayed Magwitch in films and TV:

- Frank Losee (1917)
- Henry Hull (1934)
- Finlay Currie (1946)
- James Mason (1974)
- Stratford Johns (1981)
- Anthony Hopkins (1991)
- Robert De Niro (1998)
- Bernard Hill (1999)
- Ray Winstone (2011)
- Ralph Fiennes (2012)
- Johnny Harris (2023)
