= Estella (Great Expectations) =

Dickens novel character

Estella Havisham
- Great Expectations character
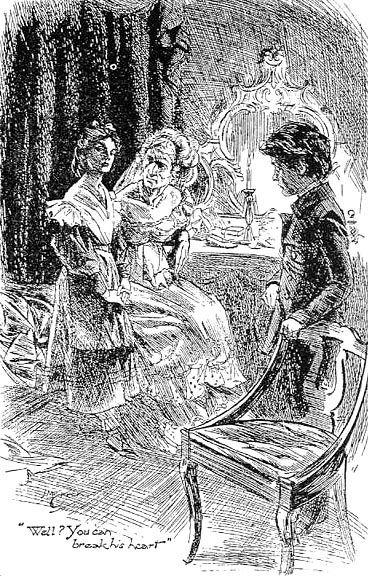
- Estella with Miss Havisham and Pip. Art by H. M. Brock.
- Created by: Charles Dickens
- Based on: Ellen Ternan (partially)

In-universe information
- Gender: Female
- Occupation: None; socialite
- Family: Miss Havisham (adoptive mother); Abel Magwitch (father); Molly (birth mother)
- Spouse: Bentley Drummle
- Relatives: Arthur Havisham (adoptive uncle); Pocket family (adoptive cousins); Cousin Raymond (adoptive); Camilla (adoptive); Georgiana (adoptive)
- Nationality: English

Estella Havisham (married name Estella Drummle) is a significant character in Charles Dickens' 1861 novel Great Expectations.

Like the protagonist, Pip, Estella is introduced as an orphan, but where Pip was raised by his sister and her husband to become a blacksmith, Estella was adopted and raised by the wealthy and eccentric Miss Havisham to become a lady.

== Inspiration ==
Estella is widely believed to have been partially based on Ellen Lawless Ternan, a young actress who was Dickens' mistress from 1857 onwards. "Ess-te-la" is created by rearranging parts of Ternan's name.

== Character history ==
=== Estella and Pip's pre-adult life ===
Pip and Estella meet when he is brought to Miss Havisham's ill-kept mansion, Satis House, ostensibly to satisfy Miss Havisham's "weird fetish" to be entertained by watching Pip and Estella play together. It is later revealed that Miss Havisham desires to have Pip's heart broken by Estella.

=== Estella's relationship with Pip ===
Estella states throughout the text that she does not love Pip. However, she shows numerous times in the novel that she holds Pip in a much higher regard compared to other men, and does not want to break his heart as she does with the others that she seduces.

=== Estella as a symbol of Pip's longings in life ===
Pip is fascinated with the lovely Estella, though her heart is as cold as ice. Aside from the evident romantic interest, which continues through much of the story, Pip's meeting with Estella marks a turning point in his young life: her beauty, grace, and prospects represent the opposite of Pip's humble existence. Estella criticises Pip's honest but "coarse" ways, and from that point on, Pip grows dissatisfied with his position in life and, eventually, with his former values and friends as well.

Pip spends years as companion to Miss Havisham and, by extension, Estella. He harbours intense love for Estella, though he has been warned that Estella has been brought up by Miss Havisham to inspire unrequited love in the men around her, in order to avenge the latter's disappointment at being jilted on her wedding day. Estella warns Pip that she cannot love him, or anyone. Miss Havisham herself eventually decries this coldness, for Estella is not even able to love her benefactress.

=== Estella and Pip as adults ===
After Pip receives an unexpected boon of a gentleman's upbringing and the "great expectation" of a future fortune from an unknown benefactor, he finds himself released from the blacksmith's apprenticeship that had been funded by Miss Havisham as compensation for Pip's years of service to her. He also finds himself thrown into Estella's social milieu in London, where Pip goes to be educated as a gentleman. He relentlessly pursues Estella, though her warm expressions of friendship are firmly countered by her insistence that she cannot love him.

In fact, Pip discovers that Miss Havisham's lessons have worked all too well on Estella; when both are visiting the elderly woman, Miss Havisham makes gestures of affection towards her adopted daughter and is shocked that Estella is neither able nor willing to return them. Estella points out that Miss Havisham taught her to be hard-hearted and unloving. Even after witnessing this scene, Pip continues to live in anguished and fruitless hope that Estella will return his love.

Estella flirts with and pursues Bentley Drummle, a disdainful rival of Pip's, and eventually marries him because she wants to break the other gentlemen suitors' hearts just like Miss Havisham told her to do. Miss Havishan is displeased that she is marrying as she could have kept breaking hearts, so her marriage could also be seen as her trying to break free from Miss Havisham's influence or rebelling against her. Seeing her flirt with the brutish Drummle, Pip asks Estella (rather bitterly) why she never displays such affection with him.

"Do you want me then," said Estella, turning suddenly with a fixed and serious, if not angry, look, "to deceive and entrap you?"
"Do you deceive and entrap him, Estella?"
"Yes, and many others—all of them but you."

This exchange suggests that Estella feels at least a modicum of love for Pip, as does the fact that in his presence, she never pretends to be anything but what she is. Rather than push him away, this honest behaviour only frustrates Pip.

It is implied that Drummle abuses Estella during their relationship and that she is very unhappy. By the end of the book, Drummle has been killed by a horse he had abused.

=== Varied resolutions of Estella's relationship with Pip ===
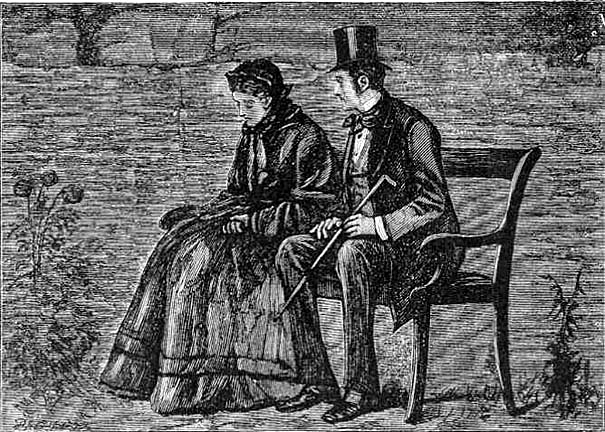
Estella and Pip. Art by F. A. Fraser.

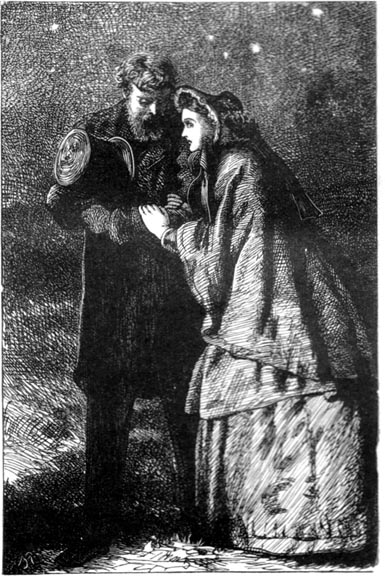
Pip and Estella's meeting at the end of Great Expectations; engraving by Marcus Stone

Though Estella marries Drummle in the novel and several adaptations, she does not marry him in the best-known 1946 film adaptation. In no version does she eventually marry Pip, at least not within the timespan of the story.

The eventual resolution of Pip's pursuit of Estella at the end of the story varies among film adaptations and even in the novel itself. Dickens' original ending is deemed by many as consistent with the thread of the novel and with Estella's allegorical position as the human manifestation of Pip's longings for social status:

I was in England again—in London, and walking along Piccadilly with little Pip—when a servant came running after me to ask would I step back to a lady in a carriage who wished to speak to me. It was a little pony carriage, which the lady was driving; and the lady and I looked sadly enough on one another.

"I am greatly changed, I know; but I thought you would like to shake hands with Estella, too, Pip. Lift up that pretty child and let me kiss it!" (She supposed the child, I think, to be my child.)

I was very glad afterwards to have had the interview; for, in her face and in her voice, and in her touch, she gave me the assurance, that suffering had been stronger than Miss Havisham's teaching, and had given her a heart to understand what my heart used to be.

As this ending was much criticized even by some famous fellow authors, Dickens wrote a second ending currently considered as the definitive one, more hopeful but also more ambiguous than the original, in which Pip and Estella have a spiritual and emotional reconciliation. The second ending echoes strongly the theme of closure found in much of the novel; Pip and Estella's relationship at the end is marked by some sadness and some joy, and although Estella still indicates that she doesn't believe she and Pip will be together, Pip perceives that she will stay with him:

"We are friends," said I, rising and bending over her, as she rose from the bench.

"And will continue friends apart," said Estella.

I took her hand in mine, and we went out of the ruined place; and, as the morning mists had risen long ago when I first left the forge, so, the evening mists were rising now, and in all the broad expanse of tranquil light they showed to me, I saw no shadow of another parting from her.

=== Estella's origins ===
Though she never knows it herself, Pip finally finds out where Estella comes from. She was the child of Jaggers's maidservant Molly, a gypsy at that time, and Abel Magwitch.

Pip becomes convinced that Molly is Estella's mother during his second dinner at Jaggers's place, when he realizes that their eyes are the same and that, when unoccupied, their fingers perform a knitting action. Wemmick tells him Molly's story: she had a child, the same age as Estella whose fate remains unknown. She came to Jaggers after he saved her from the gallows, as she had been accused of having murdered a woman out of jealousy.

One evening, after Pip returned from a visit at Miss Havisham's, Herbert tells him a story that Magwitch told him: Magwitch had a wife once and they had a child, a girl, whom Magwitch loved dearly. His wife told him she'd kill the child (because the child was what Magwitch loved the most, and Molly wanted him to suffer for what he did to her) and, as much as he knows, she did. Shortly afterwards, she was accused of murder, acquitted and then disappeared. The two stories fit so well, that Pip has no doubt: Estella is the child of Abel and Molly.

He tells this to Jaggers and Wemmick, unable to keep it to himself. Jaggers tells him the missing bit of the story (only assuming, that it could have been like that): Molly gave the child to him, to be safe in case of her conviction. Abel, believing it dead, did not dare make a stir about it. At the same time, Miss Havisham was looking for a girl to bring up and save from a misery like her own and Jaggers gave Estella to her. She was two or three at the time. Miss Havisham did not know where she came from and named her Estella. Jaggers advises Pip to be quiet about it. Nonetheless, Pip can surmise no reason to spread the secret about Estella, as her father had to keep in hiding, her mother had been about to kill the child and Estella had escaped disgrace and would be dragged back into it by the revelation. Pip keeps quiet, and only tells Magwitch, on his deathbed, that his child lives. Pip tells him that she is a beautiful young lady and that he was in love with her.

== References in pop culture ==
- Estella is referenced in Alanis Morissette's 1995 hit "All I Really Want". In the second verse, the song's narrator compares herself to her, "I'm like Estella, I like to reel it in and then spit it out, I'm frustrated by your apathy."
- The 2000 South Park episode "Pip" features an incarnation of Estella (as it does all of the major characters from Great Expectations), voiced by Eliza Schneider.
- The band The Gaslight Anthem features a song on their album The 59 Sound entitled "Great Expectations". A line in this song mentions the character by name, reading "And I never had a good time, I sat my bedside, with papers and poetry about Estella."
- A Bollywood adoption of the novel has been depicted in the 2016 movie Fitoor featuring Katrina Kaif (Estella) and Aditya Roy Kapoor (Pip) as leading protagonists.
- Estella is the main character in a companion historical fiction novel called Estella's Revenge, by Barbara Havelocke. Told from her point of view, it fills in the blanks of her childhood and adulthood, and gives her character a dark, vengeful, feminist slant.
