= Pip (Great Expectations) =

Philip Pirrip
- Great Expectations character
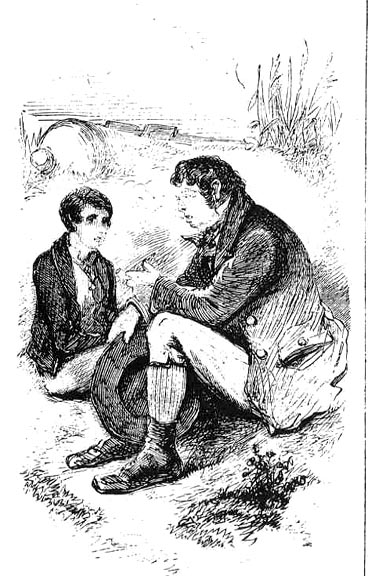
- Pip and Joe Gargery, his brother-in-law
- Created by: Charles Dickens
- Portrayed by: Jack Pickford; Phillips Holmes; John Mills; Anthony Wager; Michael York; Ioan Gruffudd; Gabriel Thomson; Jeremy Irvine; Gary Bond; Gerry Sundquist; Anthony Calf; Douglas Booth; Fionn Whitehead; Simon Gipps-Kent; Dinsdale Landen

In-universe information
- Nickname: Pip
- Gender: Male
- Occupation: Blacksmith; Gentleman; Clerk
- Family: Mrs Joe (older sister)
- Relatives: Joe Gargery (brother-in-law); Biddy (second wife of Joe)
- Nationality: British

Philip Pirrip, called Pip, is the protagonist and narrator of Charles Dickens's novel Great Expectations (1861). He is amongst the most popular characters in English literature. Pip narrates his story many years after the novel's events occur. The novel follows Pip's process from childhood innocence to adulthood. The financial and social rise of the protagonist is accompanied by an emotional and moral deterioration, which forces Pip to recognize his negative expectations in a new self-awareness.

== Characterization ==
When the novel begins in the early 1800s, Philip is a seven-year-old orphan raised by his uncaring sister, "Mrs. Joe", who beats him regularly, and her husband Joe Gargery, a blacksmith and Pip's best friend. He lives in the marsh area of Kent, England, 20 mi (32 km) from the sea.

Pip has no recollection of either of his parents; he is more than twenty years younger than his sister. Five brothers died in infancy between them: Alexander, Bartholomew, Abraham, Tobias, and Roger. He is known to himself and the world as Pip because his "infant tongue could make of both names nothing longer or more explicit than Pip". The opening scene of the novel shows Pip in a graveyard paying his respects to the graves of his parents and brothers. He says he is small for his age when he encounters the convicts at age seven, but when he is apprenticed to Joe, he is taller and becomes very strong to master the work of a blacksmith.

Pip is destined for, and wants, a career as a blacksmith like his brother-in-law, until an unexpected chain of events thrusts him into a different social class. Pip goes through many changes in his personality as various characters influence him. As the novel begins, he is an innocent young boy who does not mind his low rank in society. At around the age of eight, he meets a beautiful but proud girl named Estella who is of the upper class. Pip falls in love with her and becomes very ashamed of his humble background and his coarse-seeming relatives. When he is old enough he is bound apprentice to Joe. But he longs to be a gentleman, in a social class inaccessible to a village blacksmith. He suffers guilt for his ungrateful feelings toward Joe, who has been a kind friend to him throughout his life.

When, four years into his apprenticeship, a mysterious benefactor enables him to escape the working class, Pip moves to London as a teenager to become a gentleman. In his youth, he believes that his patron is Estella's guardian Miss Havisham, who wants to make him a suitable contender for her ward's hand. Once he moves to London, though his benefactor is not named, Pip persists in believing that Miss Havisham means him to marry Estella. He is not wise in spending the money he gets before he comes of age at 21, running up debts. His legal guardian is Mr Jaggers, a lawyer, who points out the difficulties Pip creates but leaves it to Pip to guide his own life. He does not entirely lose his good character, which is expressed mainly in his relationship with his friend Herbert Pocket.

Two years after Pip comes of age his benefactor appears in person, and it is Abel Magwitch, the convict he met as a boy. This deflates his hope that he is meant for Estella and at first disgusts him. He knows nothing about what sort of criminal the man is. Despite his disgust and disappointment, the sense of duty that compels Pip to help the convict is a mark of his inner goodness, just as it was when Pip first met him at age seven. After Abel Magwitch dies and the Crown confiscates his fortune, Pip, aged 23, understands that good clothes, genteel speech and a generous allowance do not make one a gentleman. At one point he was on the verge of being sent to debtor's prison, but the law granted him a reprieve due to his succumbing to an illness. Joe learns of this and comes to London to look after Pip until Pip can walk on his own. While recuperating, he finds a receipt stating that Joe and Biddy amortized his outstanding debt. A few days after Joe leaves, Pip goes home to find that Biddy has married Joe that very day (Pip's sister had died from being hurt in a burglary, then succumbing to her injuries years later). Without income or training for any profession, he is at loose ends. Herbert Pocket suggests Pip join the firm where he works, in an office in Cairo. Pip starts as a clerk. Herbert marries his fiancee Clara Pocket, and Pip lives with them. There is irony in this, as Pip used his gift at age 21 of 500 pounds to engage Herbert with the new firm, despite the fact he was being dogged by creditors. Working for a merchant named Clarriker, Pip finally learns discipline and financial responsibility and is now more careful.

Eleven years later, Pip returns to England to see Joe, Biddy, and their children, a daughter and a son named after him, or a "little Pip". He walks to the land where Miss Havisham's house, the Satis house, once stood and meets Estella there. Both have changed much from their experience of life. After they reconcile, they hold hands, and Pip sees no shadow to part them again.

== Role in adaptations ==
The novel has been adapted into films often. The character of Pip has been played in films and television (in order by year through 2023) by:

- Jack Pickford (1917)
- Phillips Holmes (1934)
- John Mills (1946)
- Dinsdale Landen (1959)
- Gary Bond (1967)
- Simon Gipps-Kent (1974)
- Michael York (1974)
- Gerry Sundquist (1981)
- Todd Boyce (1986)
- Anthony Calf (1989)
- Ethan Hawke (1998)
- Ioan Gruffudd (1999)
- Douglas Booth (2011)
- Jeremy Irvine (2012)
- Fionn Whitehead (2023)
