= Tragic mulatto =

Stereotypical fictional character in 19th and 20th century American literature

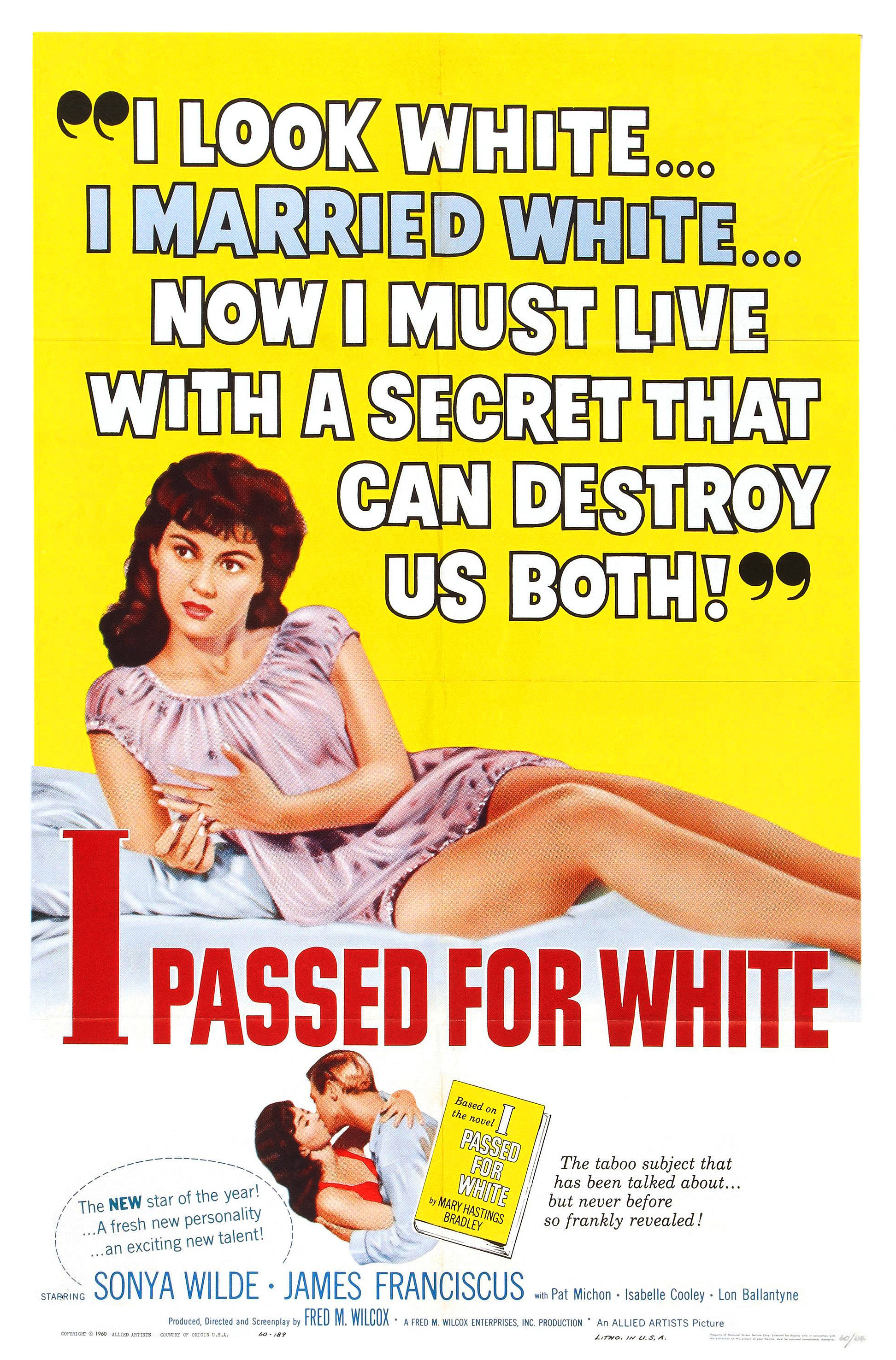
I Passed for White, a 1960 film starring Sonya Wilde as a tragic mulatto character.

The "tragic mulatto" is a fictional character trope that frequently appeared in American literature during the 19th and 20th centuries, beginning in 1837. The tragic mulatto is a mixed-race person of African American and white ancestry who experiences social marginalization due to their racial identity. These characters are normally portrayed as being unable to fully "belong" to either race. Common themes in American literature surrounding the trope include identity conflict, passing, and sexual exploitation. These works were often used to critique the social and moral consequences of slavery.

== Tragic mulatta ==
The female tragic quadroon was a stock character of abolitionist literature: a light-skinned woman raised in her father's household as though she were white, until his bankruptcy or death reduces her to a menial position and she is eventually sold. This character allowed abolitionists to draw attention to the sexual exploitation experience within slavery. Scholars have also connected this figure to the "fancy trade" in places such as New Orleans, where enslaved women of mixed ancestry, often referred to as “fancy girls,” were marketed based on their perceived beauty and sold for sexual exploitation.

These mulatta (women) endured the hardships of Africans in the Antebellum South, despite sometimes possessing physical features that allowed them to appear white. Writer Eva Allegra Raimon has argued that the writings of Lydia Maria Child helped popularize the figure by enabling white readers to identify with the character through gender while maintaining racial distance to avoid confrontation with systems that denied the humanity of nonwhite women.

The trope is often contrasted with the mammy stereotype, as the tragic mulatto occupies a more marginalized position within the racial hierarchy. Earlier cultural interpretations suggested that individuals of mixed race were created to suffer, with that suffering often taking the form of sexual abuse shaped by Eurocentric standards of beauty. Edited collections such as Complicating Constructions: Race, Ethnicity, and Hybridity in American Texts highlight how literary representations of racial hybridity challenge fixed racial categories and reflect broader cultural concerns about identity and belonging.

== Literature ==
Throughout American literature, the tragic mulatta trope is frequently portrayed through narratives that trace a woman's life on a plantation as the daughter of a slave master, emphasizing the tensions surrounding race and social status. In 1842, abolitionist Lydia Maria Child introduced the stock character in her short story The Quadroons, further developing it in Slavery Pleasant Homes the following year. The daughter is often depicted as living comfortably within southern white social norms, but this stability is ruined when her ancestry is revealed, leading to abandonment by her white partner, loss of social status, and eventual exploitation within the fancy trade. A similar depiction appears in the 1853 novel Clotel by William Wells Brown. By focusing on the mixed-race daughter of President Thomas Jefferson, the novel highlights how deeply embedded slavery remained in American society, indicating that emancipation remained distant.

== Representation in film ==
From early films to contemporary cinema, the tragic mulatto trope continues to highlight issues of racial identity, internal conflict, and belonging. During this period, the character's “personal pathologies” were emphasized in film, often centering on their unhappiness. This suffering was interpreted in different ways, with some narratives attributing it to a rejection of African ancestry, while others framed it as a division between “Black” and “white” characteristics, an interpretation more commonly favored by white filmmakers. This dynamic is illustrated in Imitation of Life (1934) through the character Peola, who rejects her family in pursuit of social acceptance; her name later became associated with a racialized slur used to describe women perceived as attempting to pass as white. In many of these narratives, such pressures ultimately culminate in the character's death or suicide, as seen in films such as The White Girl (1929) and Dark Lustre (1932).

A rare example of a male character associated with the tragic mulatto trope appears in A Soldier’s Story (1984) through Sergeant Waters, whose characterization reflects internalized racial tensions shaped by the military's hierarchical and segregated structure, as he navigates his role and identity within that setting.

In contemporary cinema, portrayals of mixed-race identity and racial belonging have become more varied, often revisiting earlier themes while presenting them in more complex and nuanced ways. While identity conflict and social pressure remain central, recent films are less likely to depict mixed-race identity as inherently "tragic", instead emphasizing how these experiences are shaped by broader historical and social forces. This shift is reflected in films such as Sinners (2025), set in the Jim Crow South, where issues of race, identity, and belonging are explored through a modern lens. In this context, the character of Mary is shaped by the social constraints of the one-drop rule, navigating a position between racial categories while facing limited acceptance in both Black and white communities. Her characterization highlights the tension between external perception and self-identity, as well as the vulnerabilities associated with existing within a rigid society. These portrayals reflect the changing ways cinema engages with themes of race, identity, and belonging in the American South.

== Notable works ==
=== Literature ===
- "Le Mulâtre
- Uncle Tom's Cabin
- The Octoroon (Life in Louisiana) 1859 play, by Dion Boucicault
- A Escrava Isaura, 1875 novel by Brazilian author Bernardo Guimarães
- Iola Leroy, 1892 novel by Frances Ellen Watkins Harper
- "Désirée's Baby", 1893 short story by Kate Chopin
- The Wife of His Youth and Other Stories of the Color-Line, 1899 by Charles W. Chesnutt
- "Stones of the Village," 1900-1910, short story by Alice Dunbar Nelson
- Passing, 1929 novel by Nella Larsen
- Imitation of Life, 1933 novel by Fannie Hurst
- Mulatto: A Play of the Deep South, 1935 play by Langston Hughes
- Band of Angels, 1955 novel by Robert Penn Warren
- A Soldier's Play, 1981 play by Charles Fuller
- The Human Stain, 2000 novel by Philip Roth
- The Vanishing Half, 2020 novel by Brit Bennett

=== Films ===
- Within Our Gates (1920)
- Imitation of Life (1934 film)
- God's Step Children (1938)
- Angelitos negros, 1948
- Lost Boundaries, 1949
- Pinky (1949)
- I Passed for White (1960)
- Angelitos negros (1970)
- Passing (film) (2021)

== See also ==
- Colorism
- Miscegenation
- One-drop rule
- Passing (racial identity)
