= Martin Chuzzlewit (1964 TV series) =

- Radio Times cover with Gary Raymond, Ilona Rodgers and Barry Jones
- Genre: Historical drama
- Based on: Martin Chuzzlewit by Charles Dickens
- Written by: Constance Cox
- Directed by: Joan Craft
- Starring: Gary Raymond; Richard Pearson; Barry Jones
- Composer: John Hotchkis
- Country of origin: United Kingdom
- Original language: English
- No. of series: 1
- No. of episodes: 13 (all missing)

Production
- Producer: Campbell Logan
- Running time: 325 minutes
- Production company: BBC

Original release
- Network: BBC TV
- Release: 19 January – 12 April 1964

Martin Chuzzlewit is a British thirteen-part television series that first aired on the BBC in 1964. It is based on the novel Martin Chuzzlewit by Charles Dickens.

No complete recordings of the production are known to exist, and it is presumed lost.

== Main cast ==
- Gary Raymond as Martin Chuzzlewit (13 episodes)
- Richard Pearson as Pecksniff (13 episodes)
- Barry Jones as Martin Chuzzlewit the Elder (12 episodes)
- John Quentin as Tom Pinch (12 episodes)
- Alex Scott as Jonas Chuzzlewit (12 episodes)
- Tom Watson as Mark Tapley (12 episodes)
- Anna Middleton as Mercy (11 episodes)
- Rosalind Knight as Charity (10 episodes)
- Ilona Rodgers as Mary Graham (9 episodes)
- Peter Bayliss as Montague Tigg (8 episodes)
- Jeremy Burnham as John Westlock (8 episodes)
- Angela Baddeley as Mrs Gamp (7 episodes)
- Harold Scott as Chuffey (7 episodes)
- Fern Warner as Ruth Pinch ( 6 episodes)
- Carl Bernard as Antony Chuzzlewit (5 episodes)
- Blake Butler as Nadgett (5 episodes)
- John Golightly as Lewsome (5 episodes)
- Barbara Ogilvie as Mrs Lupin (5 episodes)
- Barbara Cavan as Mrs Todgers (4 episodes)
- Peter Craze as Bailey (4 episodes)
- Deborah Millington as Jane (4 episodes)
- Vernon Dobtcheff as Footman (3 episodes)
- Pearson Dodd as Mr Moddle (3 episodes)
- Frederick Farley as Employer (3 episodes)
- Kathleen Harrison as Mrs Prig (3 episodes)
- Ruth Porcher as Poor woman (3 episodes)
- Peter Stephens as Mr Jinkins (3 episodes)

== Archive status ==
All thirteen episodes were shot, edited and broadcast using 405-line black and white videotapes, which were all subsequently wiped for reuse. Telerecordings existed, but they were also junked at a later date, and the serial remains mostly lost. According to Kaleidoscope, a "large chunk" from the end of episode thirteen, sourced from a 16mm film recording, does exist, which includes the end credits with the BBC's spinning globe announcement, "this is BBC1" at the end. This is believed to have come from the serial's repeat broadcast. This clip is not available publicly.

The only publicly available visual reference to the production is a publicity still used for the front cover of a Radio Times magazine, showing Gary Raymond, Barry Jones and Ilona Rodgers in character as Martin Chuzzlewit the younger, Martin Chuzzlewit the elder and Mary Graham respectively.

== Bibliography ==
- Michael Pointer. Charles Dickens on the Screen: The Film, Television, and Video Adaptations. Scarecrow Press, 1996.
