= Tom Manders =

Tom Manders may refer to:

- Tom Manders (Dutch artist) (1921–1972), Dutch artist, comedian and cabaret performer who in a later role became better known as Dorus
- Thomas Manders (1797–1859), British actor and comedian
