= Mary A. Reardon =

American painter (1912–2002)

Mary Agnes Reardon (1912–2002) was a Catholic liturgical artist; she was a painter, muralist, designer and illustrator of children's books.

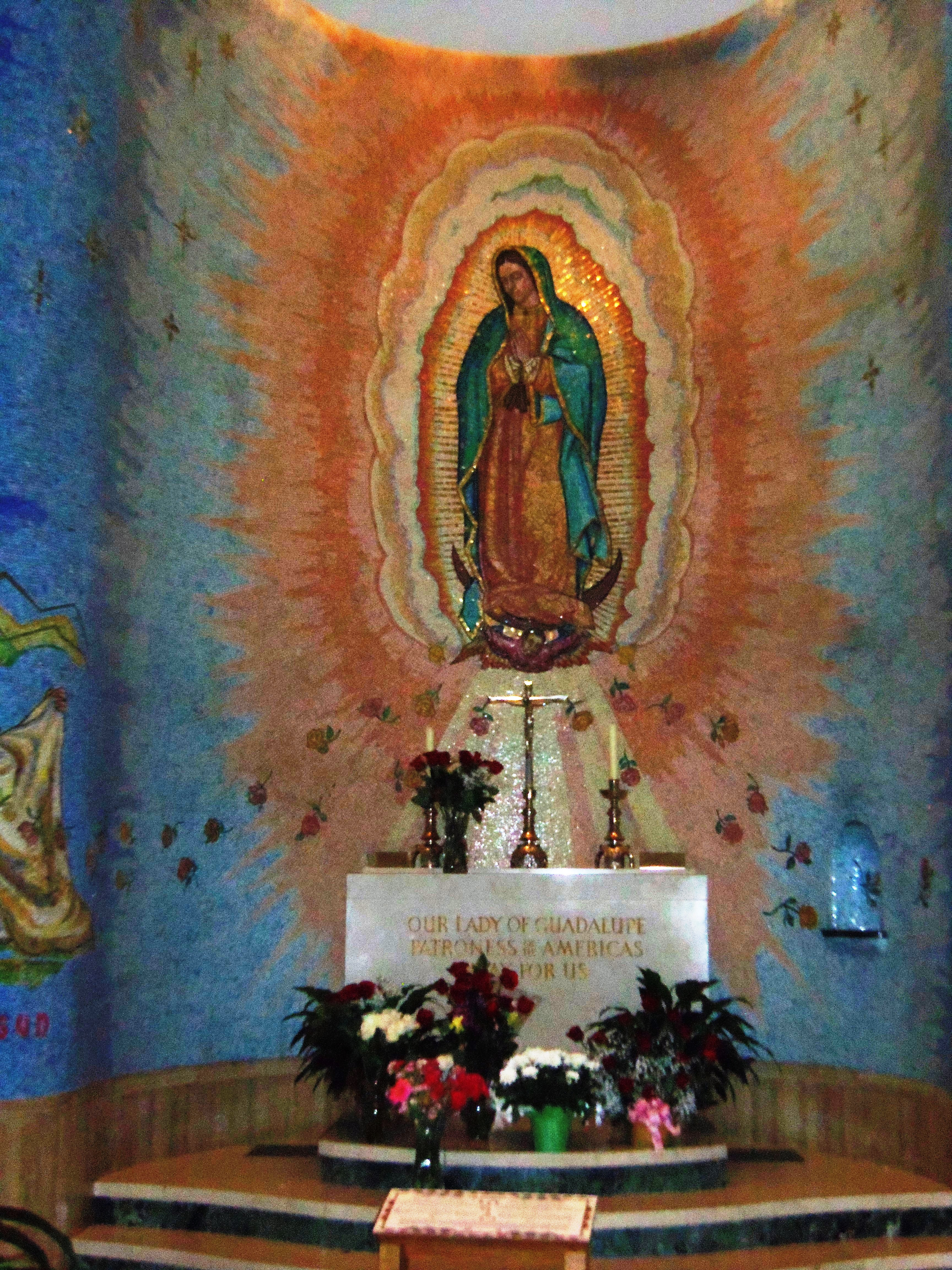
Our Lady of Guadalupe chapel in the Basilica of the National Shrine of the Immaculate Conception

Reardon attended Radcliffe College and was a BFA graduate of the Yale School of Fine Arts (1939). She also studied in Mexico with artist David Alfaro Siquieros from whom she learned true fresco. She was the designer and painter of the "first true fresco in the United States" at St. John Seminary in Brighton, Massachusetts.

Reardon painted murals for many religious institutions. Major works include the Guadalupe chapel and two transept ceilings at the National Shrine of the Immaculate Conception in Washington, D.C., a triptych at the Cathedral of Mary our Queen in Baltimore, Maryland, an early mural at Cabot Hall at Radcliffe College, two half domes, soffits and historical walls at the St. Louis Cathedral.

Reardon also illustrated seven children's books. The best known of these is Snow Treasure, with text written by Marie McSwigan. As of 2015, this book was in the collection of more than 1400 libraries.

== Book illustrations ==
- Snow Treasure
- Pope Pius XII, Rock of peace
