= Snow Treasure =

1942 children's novel by Marie McSwigan

- First edition
- Author: Marie McSwigan
- Illustrator: Mary
- Language: English
- Series: 5
- Genre: Children's literature, historical fiction
- Publisher: E. P. Dutton
- Publication date: 1942
- Publication place: United States
- Media type: Print (hardback & paperback)
- Pages: 156
- ISBN: 0-590-42537-4

Snow Treasure is a children's novel by Marie McSwigan. Set in Nazi-occupied Norway during World War II, it recounts the story of several Norwegian children who use sleds to smuggle their country's gold bullion past German guards to a waiting ship, the Cleng Peerson. Published in 1942, it has been in print ever since. The book was made into a film of the same name in 1968, directed by Irving Jacoby.

== Plot summary ==
The book is set in Norway in 1940, and starts out with four Norwegian children, Peter, Michael, Helga, and Lovisa playing on their sleds after school. Later, when the children are in bed, Peter wakes up to hear several men talking downstairs and goes down to eavesdrop. The men; Including Peter's uncle and father, need to smuggle gold past the Nazis, who have not yet invaded Norway. Peter's uncle, Uncle Victor, sees Peter and tells the other men that the solution to their problem lies with the children.

The next day, the townspeople build bomb shelters, and the day after that, the Nazis invade Norway. Uncle Victor tells Peter, Michael, Helga, and Lovisa about the men's plan. The plan is that all the children above ten years of age in their school will carry the gold past German sentries on their sleds and leave it by Uncle Victor's ship, which would then take it, for safekeeping, to America.

This plan works for two weeks until the Nazi commander in their town wants to re-open the school, which would prevent the children from sledding. The town's doctor creates a false epidemic that affects only the smaller children and paints them from head to toe with red dots. Then he tells the German commander that it is impossible to start school with this epidemic going around. He also says that he encourages the healthy children to stay outside. So, the school stays closed, and the children keep sledding.

The children are later in the story discovered by a Nazi, whom Uncle Victor and Rolls, his sailing mate, take captive. Their prisoner denies that he is a Nazi, although he is in a Nazi uniform. He tells them that his name is Jan Lasek, and that he is a young Pole who was captured by the Nazis when they invaded Poland, and forced to serve in the German army. He then asks Uncle Victor to take him to the United States because he says he has relatives there. Uncle Victor agrees, under the condition that Jan be kept prisoner until the ship departs, in case this is a Nazi trick.

At the very end of the story, all the gold is safely away on the ship going to America. Peter and Jan Lasek, the young Pole, also embark.

== Historical origins ==
The characters and some of the events described are fiction, but the story may have some basis in fact. According to the book's introduction, a cargo of gold bullion, worth $9,000,000, arrived by the freighter Bomma in Baltimore on 28 June 1940. The ship's captain reported that the gold was smuggled past the Germans by Norwegian children on their sleds. The book is often described as being "based on a true story." McSwigan stated in an author's note "that she [had] tried to be as accurate as possible in describing how the children carried the gold on sleds" while admitting that some details were changed. A journalist by trade, she wrote in 1960: "Some of my children's books are based on actual happenings. Over and over, an Associated Press dispatch or one from United-International has set me to wondering: What kind of patriots were those Norwegians who saved their gold by having their children sled it down a mountain past the occupation forces, as I subsequently made my characters do in Snow Treasure? Or what was he like, the real 'sixteen-year-old who, on a homemade portable radio transmitter, broadcast resistance against the Japanese as did my Juan of Manila? Or, what about those Czechs who stole a railway train and drove it into West Germany, as mine would do in All Aboard for Freedom? These stories came out of the newspapers." In the book's foreword McSwigan also asserted: "This story is based on an actual happening. On June 28, 1940, the Norwegian freighter Bomma reached Baltimore with a cargo of gold bullion worth $9,000,000... Two changes were made in the scant account given in the news dispatches that accompanied the disclosure of the cargo of gold. The Bomma, a coasting motorship, became the Cleng Peerson, a fishing smack. Also, the distance the gold was sledded was not twelve miles but actually thirty-five miles. Otherwise, how the Norse children set about eluding the German forces of occupation is here reconstructed as well as possible from what brief facts were permitted."

News reports published in The Baltimore Sun in 1940 described the Bomma as "a little gray Norwegian coasting motorship [and] the central figure in a mystery shipment of $9,000,000 in gold which moved in and out of the port Monday night." Under the command of Capt. Henry Lois Johannessen, speculation grew around the absence of a name "on her bows or stern [and] adding to the secrecy swirling around the ship was no mention in The Sun's shipping columns of her arrival in local waters." The newspaper said that "The Bomma docked and three heavily guarded trucks arrived at the pier simultaneously. While guards kept a sharp lookout, the trucks were piled high with cases said to contain foreign bullion. Once loaded, the armored trucks trundled off the pier and traveled through deserted city streets at midnight accompanied by a squad of police on motorcycles and in radio cars. They were en route to Camden Station where a B&O train stood waiting to receive the valuable shipment."

An article published in The Cairns Post, an Australian newspaper, on 22 August 1941, reported that £15,000,000 in gold bullion — packed in 1500 crates and requiring 30 trucks — had been smuggled past German troops from Oslo to Åndalsnes, 480 kilometres (300 miles) to the north, where British warships were waiting. The reports states: "Hiding by day in forests and lonely belts of country, and travelling by night, they slowly crept north. Outriders went ahead advising patriotic Norwegians of the coming convoy to prevent its ambush by Quislings... Then, one by one, the trucks, led by village guides, slipped through the Nazi lines and reached Andalsnes. A number of cases was put aboard a British destroyer. The rest of the gold was ferried across the fjord to Molde... That night Norwegian patriots, men, women and children, were gathered together and told what lay in the cases. Every type of craft still afloat in Molde was crewed, and the gold put on board. Small fjord boats, fishing smacks, yachts, motor boats, pleasure craft — even row boats — all set off that night and crept north along the coast until daylight."

Speaking in 2001, O.C. Holm, an expert on World War II Norwegian shipping, said "Many think the story is true. It is not." While confirming that the Bomma did transport 40,000,000 kr worth of Norway's gold to Baltimore, Siri Holm Lawson states that "[the book] may be based on the above event, or one of the other Norwegian ships transporting gold to the U.S., but the story itself is fiction."

== Reception ==
Snow Treasure won the 1945 Young Reader's Choice Award.

Awards
Preceded by The Black Stallion	Young Reader's Choice Award recipient 1945	Succeeded by The Return of Silver Chief

== Adaptation ==
Snow Treasure was made into a film in 1968. It was produced, directed, and co-written by Irving Jacoby with Marie McSwigan. The movie starred Paul Austad as Peter Lundstrom and Tina Austad as Peter's sister; the cast also included James Franciscus and Ilona Rodgers.

== See also ==
- Flight of the Norwegian National Treasury
- Namsos Campaign
- Norwegian resistance movement
