= Ilona Rodgers =

English actress

- Born: Ilona Jeanette Rodgers; 28 April 1942 (age 84); Harrogate, West Riding of Yorkshire, England
- Occupation: Actress
- Years active: 1962–present

Ilona Jeannette Rodgers (born 28 April 1942) is a British actress of stage, television and film. Born in Harrogate, West Riding of Yorkshire, where she started her career, she later went on to appear in New Zealand and Australian productions.

Rodgers has also worked in American productions including Hercules: The Legendary Journeys and Power Rangers

== Biography ==
=== Early life and career in the United Kingdom ===
Rodgers, a native of Yorkshire, trained in ballet and drama a stage in Surrey and the Bristol Old Vic. Breakthrough roles came in British television, including Carol in The Sensorites, a six-episode adventure in the BBC science-fiction series Doctor Who. She also appeared in an adaptation of Martin Chuzzlewit and made guest appearances in The Avengers and Adam Adamant Lives!. She had a guest role in America in The Beverly Hillbillies and The Saint. Her final British screen credit was an episode of Paul Temple in 1970, before she emigrated to New Zealand.

=== Career in New Zealand and Australia (Oceania) ===
Rodgers first lived in New Zealand from 1973, appearing in the soap opera Close to Home and a successful goldmining drama, Hunter's Gold.

Between 1978 and the mid-1980s she lived in Australia. There, she appeared in television programmes The Sullivans, over 200 episodes of Sons and Daughters (as Patricia Hamilton's sister, Margaret Dunne) and the 1985 Australian miniseries Anzacs (as Lady Thea Barrington), as well as nine episodes of Prisoner in 1983 as character Zara Moonbeam, an imprisoned medium who claimed to have clairvoyant powers.

After relocating back to New Zealand, her work included medical soap Shortland Street and presenting duties on a light entertainment and advertorial program called Good Morning.

Rodger's best-known role in New Zealand is probably TV series Gloss. She starred in Gloss for three seasons, from 1987 to 1990, playing bossy magazine editor Maxine Redfern. The series was about a fictional publishing empire run by the Redfern family. Rodgers played the Australian wife of New Zealand comedian Billy T. James in the final, sitcom version of The Billy T James Show (1990).

Her stage work has included the one-woman play Shirley Valentine, By Degrees written by Roger Hall, and Three Tall Women by Edward Albee.

== Filmography ==
=== Film ===
Year	Title	Role	Notes
1968	Salt and Pepper	Marianne Renaud	
1968	Snow Treasure	Bente Nielsen	
1984	Utu	Emily Williamson	
2009	I'm Not Harry Jenson	Margaret	
2011	Rest for the Wicked	Esther	
2013	Chloe	Jen	Short
2015	Syrenia	Nanna Mary	

=== Television ===
Year	Title	Role	Notes
1962–1964	Emergency – Ward 10	Nurse Sarah Smith	Recurring role
1963	The Human Jungle	First Nurse	"Over and Out"
1963	ITV Play of the Week	Caroline Campbell	"Conspiracy of Silence"
1963	The Avengers	Receptionist	"Six Hands Across a Table"
1964	Martin Chuzzlewit	Mary Graham	TV miniseries
1964	Doctor Who	Carol Richmond	"The Sensorites" (6 episodes)
1966	Adam Adamant Lives!	Susan	"The Terribly Happy Embalmers"
1967	This Man Craig	Violette Johns	"You Can Choose Your Friends"
1967	The Avengers	Samantha Slade	"The Bird Who Knew Too Much"
1967	The Saint	Mary	"A Double in Diamonds"
1967	Thirty-Minute Theatre	Judy	"The Wake"
1967	Theatre 625	Angiolina Zarri	"As a Man Grows Older"
1968	Theatre 625	The Baroness	"The Pistol Shot"
1968	The Beverly Hillbillies	Sandra MacGregor	"Coming Through the Rye"
1968	Sherlock Holmes	Rachel Carey	"Black Peter"
1968	ITV Playhouse	Sally	"Premiere: Foxhole in Bayswater"
1969	ITV Playhouse	Judy	"Murder: When Robin Was a Boy"
1969	Dr. Finlay's Casebook	Kathrin Soutar	"The Visitation"
1969	Barrister at Law	Jane Paston	TV film
1970	Strange Report	Beth	"Swindle - Square Root of Evil"
1970	Paul Temple	Nancy	"Swan Song for Colonel Harp"
1975	Close to Home	Vivian	Soap Opera
1975	Winners and Losers	Katherine	"The Woman at the Store"
1976	The Sullivans	Kate Meredith	TV series
1977	Hunter's Gold	Molly Grogan	TV series
1977	Colour Scheme	Ursula Harme	TV film
1978	Died in the Wool	Ursula Harme	TV film
1978	Gather Your Dreams	Aunt	TV series
1978	Child's Play		"Rumpelstiltskin"
1981	Outbreak of Love	Marcia Rockingham	TV film
1982	Sara Dane	Julia Ryder	TV film
1982	1915	Mrs. Reilly	TV miniseries
1983	Prisoner	Zara Moonbeam	Recurring role (series 5)
1983	Silent Reach	Patty Mountford	TV miniseries
1983–84	Sons and Daughters	Margaret Dunne	Main role (series 2)
1984	Special Squad	Helen Anderson	"Until Death"
1985	Anzacs	Lady Thea Barrington	TV miniseries
1986	Cuckoo Land	Aunt Menace	Episode "Aunt Menace comes to stay"
1987–90	Gloss	Maxine Redfern	Main role (series 1–3)
1988	The Far Country	Jane Armitage	TV film
1989	Night of the Red Hunter	Jill Piper	TV series
1990	The Billy T James Show	Thelma	TV series
1990–1992	The New Adventures of Black Beauty	Hilda Burton	Main role (series 1)
1992	Marlin Bay	Charlotte Kincaid	TV series
1995	Riding High	Mrs. Harrington	"1.37", "1.47", "1.48"
1995	Hercules: The Legendary Journeys	Queen Camilla	"The Festival of Dionsyus"
1997	Hercules: The Legendary Journeys	Queen Euriana	"Long Live the King"
1998	City Life	Beverley Gribble	"1.19"
2003–2005	Shortland Street	Ngaire Thompson	TV series
2006	Maddigan's Quest	Gabrielle	"Off the Map"
2016	Power Rangers Dino Charge	G-Ma Betty	"Catching Some Rays"
2016	Dirty Laundry	Nana Pat	Regular role
2018	Westside		Season 4 episode
2018	The Brokenwood Mysteries	Mrs McTavish	Series 5
2018	The Bad Seed	Barbara Cole	
2020	Power Rangers Beast Morphers	Stacy	"Goin’ Ape"
2024	My Life is Murder (TV series)		
