= The Americans (1961 TV series) =

- Genre: Drama
- Starring: Darryl Hickman; Richard Davalos
- Country of origin: United States
- No. of seasons: 1
- No. of episodes: 17

Production
- Executive producer: Frank Telford
- Camera setup: Single-camera
- Running time: 44 mins.

Original release
- Network: NBC
- Release: January 23 – May 15, 1961

The Americans is an American drama television series that aired on NBC from January 23, 1961, to September 11, 1961. Set during the American Civil War, the series focuses on two brothers fighting on opposite sides of the conflict. Guest stars included Lee Marvin, Jack Elam, Brian Keith, Kathleen Crowley and Robert Redford, among many others.

== Background ==
The series was inspired by James Warner Bellah's 1953 novel The Valiant Virginians which was serialized in the Saturday Evening Post as Tales of the Valorous Virginians from May 9, 1953, through June 10, 1954. The novel is an arc of separate stories on the impact of the war on the young men fighting it. The series characters are Ben Canfield, who fights with the Union Army, and Jeff Canfield, his younger brother who fights with the Confederate Army.

== Production ==
The series was part of the United States' commemoration of the centennial of the beginning of the Civil War. It aired as a mid-season replacement for the canceled western series, Riverboat, broadcast in the 7:30–8:30 p.m. timeslot on Monday evenings.

Ben Canfield was played by Darryl Hickman, older brother of actor Dwayne Hickman; Richard Davalos played Jeff Canfield; Davalos had portrayed James Dean's character's brother in East of Eden. Hickman and Davalos were the only actors who appeared in every episode of the series. Most of the supporting cast appear in only a single episode though several actors played the same role in more than one episode:

- John McIntire, just weeks prior to replacing Ward Bond on NBC's Wagon Train in the wake of Bond's sudden death, played Ben and Jeff's father, Pa Canfield.
- John Doucette as Capt. Cardiff
- Sandy Kenyon as Ritter
- Slim Pickens as Johnson
- Wynn Pearce as Bailey

Among the more well-known actors to appear in this series were the following:

Lee Marvin, Robert Redford, Jack Elam, Brian Keith, Robert Culp, Jack Lord, Michael Rennie, Nina Foch, Dan O'Herlihy, James Franciscus, Susan Oliver, Ray Walston, Lloyd Bochner, Dick York, Jackie Coogan, L. Q. Jones, and Carroll O'Connor.

Seventeen one-hour episodes were broadcast, although either twenty-one or twenty-six episodes were filmed. Episodes were written by, among others, John Gay (screenwriter for the film Run Silent Run Deep and of many television adaptions of literary classics), William D. Gordon (who also acted in at least one episode), Andy Lewis (writer of the movie Klute), Carey Wilber (writer of the Star Trek episode "Space Seed"), and Pat Falken Smith (head writer in the 1970s and 1980s for the soap operas Days of Our Lives and General Hospital). Music for the series was created by composers Bernard Herrmann and Hugo Friedhofer. Henry Steele Commager was the historical consultant.

A tie-in novel called The Americans, written by Donald Honig, was released in paperback by Popular Library publishers in 1961.

== Episodes/cast ==
First-run episodes of the series aired January 23, 1961, through May 15, 1961; repeats aired from May 22 through September 11, 1961.

- Episode 1: Harper's Ferry (broadcast January 23, 1961)
  The Canfield family finds itself split down the middle after the Civil War breaks out when Confederate forces attack the Union arsenal at Harpers Ferry, now West Virginia.
- Episode 2: Rebellion at Blazing Rock (broadcast January 30, 1961)
  Jeff encounters two men, one Confederate and one Yankee, preparing to stage a mock battle.
  Michael Rennie played Capt. James Duquesne
  Ray Daley ... Bugler
  John Howard ... Capt. Chilcoath
  Karen Sharpe ... Louanne Higgins
  Adam Williams ... Wilcott
- Episode 3: The Regular (broadcast February 6, 1961)
  A regular-army sergeant, delivering guns to a volunteer unit, is shocked at how badly trained they are.
  Kathleen Crowley played Lucy Vickery
  Ken Drake ... Bravo
  William D. Gordon ... Lt. Barnes
  Maurice Manson ... Mayor Cahill
  William Murray ... Craigie
  Kent Smith ... Capt. Vickery
- Episode 4: The Rebellious Rose (broadcast February 13, 1961)
  The beautiful Rose Greenhow serves the Confederacy by charming susceptible Union officials into talking too much. When Jeff comes to Washington, D.C., Rose charms him into committing murder.
  Charles Aidman ... Capt. Wheeler
  Nina Foch ... Rose Greenhow
  Martin Gabel ... Tim Mayhew
- Episode 5: On to Richmond (broadcast February 20, 1961)
  Ben sees that his volunteer soldiers are not the combat professionals he needs for the upcoming Battle of First Bull Run.
  Diana Millay ... Emma Templeton
- Episode 6: Half Moon Road (broadcast February 27, 1961)
  Jeff goes deep into the backwoods to recruit sharpshooters for the Confederate army.
  James Barton ... Old Goodwin
  Enid Jaynes ... Melissa (as Enid Janes)
  Jack Lord ... Charlie Goodwin
  George Mitchell ... Preacher
- Episode 7: Reconnaissance (broadcast March 6, 1961)
  Jeff is assigned to sneak through enemy lines to gather information. He then discovers his brother Ben is among the Union soldiers stationed there.
  Diane Jergens ... Sally
  Lee Marvin ... Capt. Judd
  Don Megowan ... Lt. Fairfax
  Jan Stine ... Hollis
  Brad Weston ... Cpl. Blackburn
- Episode 8: The Escape (broadcast March 13, 1961)
  Col. Fry and Ben are captured and sent to the Confederate POW camp at Libby Prison.
  Dayton Lummis ... Maj. Turner
  Dan O'Herlihy ... Col. Fry
- Episode 9: The Guerrillas (broadcast March 20, 1961)
  A band of guerrillas lays siege to a town torn apart by the war.
  Norman Alden ... Paine
  Robert Culp ... Finletter
  Cyril Delevanti ... Canfield
  Berry Kroeger ... Keezer
  Paul Lambert ... Hudson
  Strother Martin ... Wadd
  Sonya Wilde ... Caroline
- Episode 10: The Invaders (broadcast March 27, 1961)
  After a Union force takes over a Confederate town, its captain orders the Confederate flag taken down. Outraged, an elderly resident of the town fires at him.
  Steve Brodie ... Sgt. Rafer
  Myrna Fahey ... Ruth
  James Franciscus ... Lt. Hannon
  Frank Gerstle ... Capt. Bice
  Ian Wolfe ... Sever
- Episode 11: The Gun (broadcast April 3, 1961)
  Jeff is ordered to capture Union cannons.
  Robert Carlyle ... Sergeant
  Lonny Chapman ... Chester Longbaugh
  Jack Elam ... Loper Johnson
  Susan Oliver ... Rachel
- Episode 12: The Sentry (broadcast April 10, 1961)
  Three Confederates are assigned to sabotage an important railroad trestle.
  Ben Cooper ... Ward Roberts
  Robert Hastings ... Lieutenant
  Brian Keith ... Owen
  Judson Pratt ... Sgt. Willers
- Episode 13: The Bounty Jumpers (broadcast April 17, 1961)
  Ben goes undercover to gather evidence on a criminal ring that specializes in phony recruits.
  Larry Gates ... Maj. Eustice Cary
  Anne Helm ... Dulcie Morrow
  Gene Lyons ... Col. Elgin
  Murvyn Vye ... Police Lieutenant
  Ray Walston ... Whit Bristow
- Episode 14: Long Way Back (broadcast April 24, 1961)
  A group of Missouri farmers capture Jeff.
  Patricia Barry ... Jessica
  Charles Bickford ... Peterson
  Ron Nicholas ... Scout
  Walter Sande ... Jayhawker
- Episode 15: The War Between the States (broadcast May 1, 1961)
  Ben is worried when his best friend falls for a Confederate girl.
  Lloyd Bochner ... Lt. Brady
  Lisabeth Hush ... Rebel girl
  John McGiver ... Col. Allen
  Lurene Tuttle ... Mrs. Allen
  Dick York ... Bolick
- Episode 16: The Coward (broadcast May 8, 1961)
  A soldier convicted of cowardice under fire and sentenced to death has his execution delayed. However, two of the soldiers in his company are determined to see the sentence carried out, even if they have to do it themselves.
  Jackie Coogan ... Rowe
  L.Q. Jones ... Yonts
  Carroll O'Connor ... Capt. Garbor
  Robert Redford ... George Harrod
- Episode 17: The Inquisitors (broadcast May 15, 1961)
  The U.S. Congress wants answers about some disastrous battle results for the Union Army.
  Robert Gist ... Gen. Charles P. Stone
  Marsha Hunt ... Jeanie Stone
  Robert Middleton ... U.S. Senator Benjamin Wade of Ohio
