= Isabel Cooley =

American actress and model (1924–2000)

- Studio portrait of unknown date.
- Born: Jane Isabelle Cooley; 20 July 1924; Cleveland, Ohio, U.S.
- Died: 3 January 2000 (aged 75); Greenville, Mississippi, U.S.
- Other names: "The Most Beautiful Coloured Girl"; Isabelle Cooley
- Education: Cleveland Play House; Cleveland College
- Occupations: Actress; model; theatre actress
- Years active: 1942–2000
- Spouse: Addison S. Collins Jr. (m. 1946; div. 1966)
- Parent(s): Holly Cooley (mother); Harriett Cooley (father)

Isabelle Cooley (born Jane Isabelle Cooley; July 20, 1924 – January 3, 2000), often credited as Isabel Cooley, was an American stage, film, and television actress. Active from the late 1940s through the early 1990s, she was a versatile performer known for her roles in major motion pictures such as Cleopatra (1963) and Parenthood (1989). Known for her striking appearance and versatile performances, Cooley gained international attention in the 1950s and success on the London stage, where she was once described as "The Most Beautiful Coloured Girl in the World".

== Early life and education ==
Jane Isabelle Cooley was born on July 20, 1924, in Cleveland, Ohio, to Holly Cooley and Harriett (Storey) Cooley. Raised on East 82nd Street, she was enrolled in the Cleveland Play House at age 12 by her mother, who intended for the program to improve Jane's poise and speech rather than to prepare her for an acting career. However, Jane developed a passion for the theater and remained in the children's program until the age of 16.

After high school, she attended Cleveland College for two years as an English major. In the fall of 1945, seeking a faster pace for her career, she moved to New York City against her mother's wishes.

== Career ==
=== Early stage and "The Most Beautiful Coloured Girl" ===
After arriving in New York, Cooley worked as a waitress for six months while honing her craft. Her breakthrough came when she was cast as the lead in the all-Black comedy-drama Anna Lucasta on Broadway, replacing the original star who had fallen ill. The performance made her a sensation.

In the early 1950s, she moved to London, where she performed with the Players Theatre Guild in productions of Hamlet and The Square Ring. It was during this period that international media dubbed her "The Most Beautiful Coloured Girl in the World".

=== Film and television ===
Cooley's film career began in earnest in the late 1950s. Her most notable role was as Charmian, the loyal handmaiden to Elizabeth Taylor's title character in the 1963 epic Cleopatra. Despite a near-fatal car accident in 1962 that required extensive plastic surgery, Cooley returned to the screen within a year.

Her later film credits included I Passed for White (1960), Real Genius (1985), and Parenthood (1989). On television, she was a prolific star, appearing in more than 29 productions including Hogan's Heroes as Princess Yawanda, The Man from U.N.C.L.E., Dallas, Matlock as Judge Jean Bailey, and Murder, She Wrote.

== Personal life ==
On August 15, 1946, Cooley married jazz musician Addison Shields Collins Jr. in Manhattan. The marriage ended in divorce in January 1966.

== Death ==
Cooley died on January 3, 2000, in Greenville, Mississippi, at the age of 75.

== Filmography ==
=== Television ===
Year	Title	Role	Notes
1957	Lux Video Theatre	Adele	Episode: "The Great Lie"
1958	Playhouse 90	Moran's Maid	Episode: "The Female of the Species"
1961	The Law and Mr. Jones	Nancy Mills	Episode: "A Very Special Citizen"
1963	Ben Casey	Dorris Burns	Episode: "A Memory of Candy Floss"
1963	Dr. Kildare	Phyllis Johns	Episode: "The Mosaic"
1963	The Great Adventure	Lydia	Episode: "Go Down, Moses"
1963	Bob Hope Presents the Chrysler Theatre	The Operator	Episode: "Seven Miles of Bad Road"
1964	My Living Doll	Nurse Nelson	Episode: "The Beauty Contest"
1965	Profiles in Courage	Mrs. Johnson	Episode: "Frederick Douglass"
1965	General Hospital	Carol	1 episode
1965	The Man from U.N.C.L.E.	Conchita Delgado	Episode: "The Very Important Zombie Affair"
1966	Hogan's Heroes	Princess Yawanda	Episode: "The Prince from the Phone Company"
1966	Run for Your Life	Barbara Jackson	Episode: "The Last Safari"
1968	The Outcasts	Sophie	Episode: "The Outcasts"
1970	The Mod Squad	Marion Lefevre	Episode: "The Decision"
1970	Storefront Lawyers	Mattie	Episode: "The Mechanics" (as Men at Law)
1970	The Bill Cosby Show	Miss Richards	Episode: "The Runaway"
1971	The Smith Family	Florence Thomas	Episode: "The Desk Clerk"
1975	Insight	Lee Anna	Episode: "The Last of the Great Male Chauvinists"
1975	Medical Story	Mrs. Andy Mayhew	Episode: "The Moonlight"
1975	Police Story	Mrs. Fielder	Episode: "Across the Line"
1971–1977	This Is the Life	Vivian	2 episodes
1977	Family	Nurse Bragge	Episode: "An Eye to the Future"
1977	Most Wanted	Judge Marian Talbot	Episode: "The Inside Man"
1979	Harris and Company	Jenny	1 episode
1979	Walking Through the Fire	Nurse	TV movie
1979	The White Shadow	Reba Reese	Episode: "Sudden Death"
1979	Dallas	Donna's maid	Episode: "The Wheeler Dealer"
1980	The Incredible Hulk	Muriel	Episode: "Proof Positive"
1980	Haywire	The Nurse	TV movie
1981	It's a Living	Interviewer #3	Episode: "Off the Top"
1983	Mr. Smith	Nurse	1 episode
1985	What's Happening Now!!	Angry Makeup Customer	1 episode
1986	Riptide	Maid	Episode: "The Lucky Penny"
1987	Jake and the Fatman	Judge	Episode: "Fatal Attraction"
1989	Hunter	Woman	Episode: "The Pit"
1989–1990	Matlock	Judge Webber / Judge Bailey	2 episodes
1990	Murder, She Wrote	Head Nurse	Episode: "The Sins of Castle Lake"
1990	Parenthood	Terri	1 episode

=== Film ===
Year	Title	Role	Notes
1957	Raintree County	Soona	Debut
1958	Suicide Battalion	Julie	
1958	Anna Lucasta	Katie	
1959	Never So Few	Shan Girl	
1960	I Passed for White	Bertha	
1963	Cleopatra	Charmian	
1965	Brainstorm	Nurse	
1968	Uptight	Melina	
1978	Youngblood	School Principal	
1979	Chapter Two	Customs Officer	
1982	Tag: The Assassination Game	Prof. Wadsworth	
1982	The Escape Artist	Secretary	
1983	Breathless	Photographer	
1985	Real Genius	TV Stage Manager	
1987	Walk Like a Man	Judge / Bystander	
1989	Parenthood	Barbara Rice	
1989	Silent Night, Deadly Night 3: Better Watch Out!	Hospital Receptionist	
1991	Rich Girl	Counselor	

== Stage ==
=== Theatre ===
Year	Title	Role(s)	Venue(s)	Notes
1944	Anna Lucasta	Anna	Mansfield Theatre	Debut
1946	Anna Lucasta	Anna	Mansfield Theatre	
1947	Anna Lucasta	Anna	National Theatre	
1952	The Merchant of Venice	Dane	New York Theatre	She is credited as the first Black woman to appear in a New York production of Shakespear play
1953	The Square Ring	Dancer	Players Theatre Guild	
1953	Anna Lucasta	Anna	Prince of Wales Theatre	
1953	Hamlet	Ophelia	London televised production	She became the first Black woman to portray Ophelia
1954	Anna Lucasta	Anna	Hippodrome, London	West End revival
1960	The Long Dream	Gladys	Ambassador Theatre	
