= Charmion (servant to Cleopatra) =

Egyptian servant

Charmion (Greek: Χάρμιον; from Ancient Greek χάρμα (kharma) 'source of delight'), alternatively Charmian, was a trusted servant and advisor to Cleopatra VII of Egypt. Plutarch, in his Parallel Lives biography of Mark Antony, writes that Charmion managed the principal affairs of Cleopatra's government; therefore, she held an important position in Cleopatra's trusted circle.

== Plutarch ==
In his Parallel Lives biography of Mark Antony, Plutarch noted that Augustus Caesar "had a decree made, declaring war on Cleopatra, and depriving Antony of the authority which he had let a woman exercise in his place. Caesar added that [Antony] had drunk potions that had bereaved him of his senses, and that the generals they would have to fight with would be Mardion the eunuch, Potheinus, Iras, Cleopatra's hairdressing girl, and Charmion, who were Antony's chief state-councillors."

Plutarch later described the scene after Cleopatra's suicide:

The messengers came at full speed, and found the guards apprehensive of nothing; but on opening the doors, they saw her stone-dead, lying upon a bed of gold, set out in all her royal ornaments. Iras, one of her women, lay dying at her feet, and Charmion, just ready to fall, scarce able to hold up her head, was adjusting her mistress's diadem. And when one that came in said angrily, "Was this well done of your lady, Charmion?" "Extremely well," she answered, "and as became the descendant of so many kings"; and as she said this, she fell down dead by the bedside.

== Shakespeare ==
Charmion has been dramatized numerous times alongside Cleopatra, most notably in William Shakespeare's tragedy Antony and Cleopatra (as "Charmian" /ˈkɑːrmiːən/ KAR-mee-ən or /ˈtʃɑːrmiːən/ CHAR-mee-ən). Shakespeare's final line for Charmian derives from Plutarch.

It is well done, and fitting for a princess

Descended of so many royal kings.

Shakespeare gives Cleopatra another handmaid named Iras; notably, she has fewer lines and less characterization than Charmian.

== Later dramatizations ==
A lost 1917 silent film Cleopatra featured Dorothy Drake as Charmian, and Eleanor Phelps appeared as Charmion in 1934's Cleopatra starring Claudette Colbert. Jean Byron was Charmion in 1953's Serpent of the Nile, and Elizabeth Taylor's 1963 Cleopatra had Isabel Cooley in the role of Charmian.

Mezzo-soprano Rosalind Elias portrayed Charmian in the initial run of Samuel Barber's 1966 opera Antony and Cleopatra, based on Shakespeare's play.

In 2005 and 2007, Charmian was portrayed by Kathryn Hunter in the HBO/BBC television series Rome.

Charmion is the main character in the novels Hand of Isis by Jo Graham and Queen Cleopatra by Talbot Mundy.

Most recently, Charmion was portrayed by Kaysha Woollery in the 2023 Netflix series, Queen Cleopatra.
