= I Passed for White =

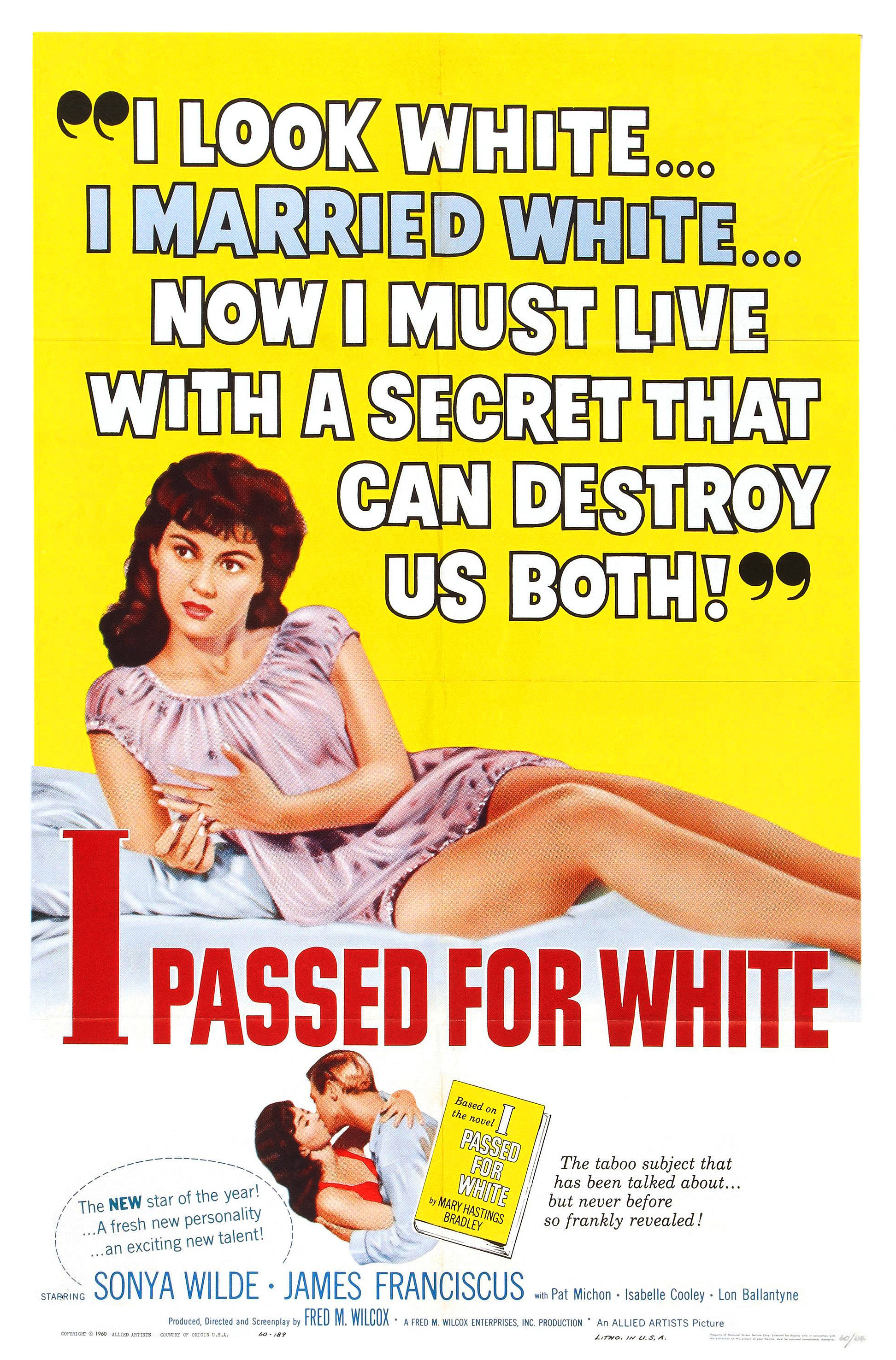
- Theatrical poster
- Directed by: Fred M. Wilcox
- Written by: Fred M. Wilcox
- Based on: novel by Reba Lee as told to Mary Hastings Bradley
- Produced by: Fred M. Wilcox
- Starring: Sonya Wilde; James Franciscus
- Cinematography: George J. Folsey
- Edited by: George White
- Music by: Jerry Irvin; John Williams (as Johnny Williams)
- Distributed by: Allied Artists Pictures
- Release date: March 18, 1960 (U.S.)
- Running time: 93 minutes
- Country: United States
- Language: English
- Box office: $1,700,000 (US/ Canada)

I Passed for White is a 1960 American drama film directed and adapted for the screen by Fred M. Wilcox from a novel of the same title by "Reba Lee, as told to" Mary Hastings Bradley. The film stars Sonya Wilde and James Franciscus and features Jimmy Lydon, Patricia Michon, and Isabel Cooley. It was released by Allied Artists on March 18, 1960.

== Plot ==
Bernice Lee (Sonya Wilde) is a young woman of mixed African and European ancestry, living in Chicago with her family. She is mistaken for a fully white woman by a white man who repeatedly suggests a romantic encounter. Her brother, more obviously of mixed heritage, fights off the man. Bernice's grandmother consoles her when she confides her troubles.

After a failed attempt at looking for employment as a black woman, she decides to leave town. She begins to use the name Lila Brownell and live as a white woman. On the plane to New York City, she meets and eventually marries the man of her dreams – Rick Leyton (James Franciscus) – and fails to mention her African ancestry, an important omission as interracial marriage is heavily stigmatized in 1960. Rick and his wealthy family and friends are white. Her white friend Sally (Patricia Michon) and black maid Bertha (Isabel Cooley) both advise her not to tell him. She becomes pregnant, and fears the child will have black features or coloring – and gets a book to read about this unlikely possibility, which she hides. Rick eventually discovers it, and their maid claims the book belongs to her.

Lila goes into premature labor and has a stillborn child, but cries out "Is the baby black?" after she awakens from anesthesia. This leads Rick to suspect that his wife has been unfaithful. She and her husband have a bitter quarrel after she is discharged from the hospital. While her husband accuses her of lying about her family, her history, and her past, Lila is unwilling to tell the truth about her racial ancestry. After he gives himself time to come to terms with what has happened, Lila decides that it would be best for her to leave without a trace and go back to her original family. She tells her friend Sally her real name as a final good-bye and returns to her family in Chicago and her original identity.

The ending is an example of the tragic mulatto trope.

== Cast ==
- Sonya Wilde as Bernice Lee / Lila Brownell
- James Franciscus as Rick Leyton
- Patricia Michon as Sally Roberts
- Elizabeth Council as Ann Leyton
- Griffin Crafts as Mr. Leyton
- Isabel Cooley as Bertha
- Jimmy Lydon as Jay Morgan
- Thomas Browne Henry as Dr. Merritt
- Max Mellinger as Mr. Gordon
- Phyllis Cole as nurse
- Calvin Jackson as Eddie, in Dance School
- Lon Ballantyne as Chuck
- Temple Hatton as Eddie, Friend of Bernice
- Freita Shaw as Gram
- Vampira as Poet Gleen
- Edmund Hashim as Club Patron
- Ray Kellogg as bartender

== Production ==
A white actress was cast as the producers felt many white audience members would not want to see an inter-racial relationship between two actors on the screen.

== Reception ==
The film was a box office success.

Eugene Archer of The New York Times stated that it was "low-budget" and used "tabloid sensationalism"; he concluded that it was "Amateurishly written, directed and played".

Although similar in story arc, Janine Bradbury of The Guardian stated that it "failed to match the success of Imitation of Life."

== See also ==
- List of American films of 1960
