= Night of the Red Hunter =

1989 New Zealand sci-fi children's television series

- Created by: Ken Catran
- Written by: Ken Catran
- Directed by: David Copeland
- Starring: Toni Driscoll; Tobey Laing
- Composer: Peter Blake
- Country of origin: New Zealand
- Original language: English
- No. of seasons: 1
- No. of episodes: 4

Production
- Producer: Chris Hampson
- Cinematography: Rocky Hudson
- Editors: Allan Honey; Sue Malcolmson
- Running time: 25 minutes

Original release
- Release: September 10 – October 1, 1989

Night of the Red Hunter is a 1989 New Zealand sci-fi television series for children. It stars 13 year olds Tobey Laing and Toni Driscoll as two children on the run who team up to investigate a mystery. Laing was injured just before filming begun causing a change in the shooting schedules and use of a body double.

John Mangan in the Age calls it a "charming tale of adventure and intrigue" which "seems to have all the ingredients of good children's viewing."

== Cast ==
- Toni Driscoll as Maggie
- Tobey Laing as Peter
- Greer Robson as Tay
- Bruno Lawrence as Ish Murdie
- Lloyd Scott as Jed Piper
- Ilona Rodgers as Jill Piper
