= The Amazing Dobermans =

- Theatrical release poster
- Directed by: Byron Ross Chudnow
- Screenplay by: Michael Kraike; William Goldstein; Richard Chapman
- Produced by: David Chudnow
- Starring: Fred Astaire; James Franciscus; Barbara Eden; Jack Carter; Billy Barty
- Cinematography: Gregory Sandor
- Edited by: James Potter
- Music by: Alan Silvestri
- Production company: Doberman Associates
- Distributed by: Golden Films
- Release dates: November 19, 1976 (Los Angeles); November 24, 1976 (wide)
- Running time: 96 minutes
- Country: United States
- Language: English

The Amazing Dobermans (re-titled Lucky for its 1978 re-release) is a 1976 American crime comedy film starring Fred Astaire, James Franciscus and Barbara Eden. It is the second and final sequel in a trilogy of Doberman Gang films that includes The Doberman Gang (1972) and The Daring Dobermans (1973). The film was re-released theatrically in 1978 under the new title Lucky and was re-distributed by Rosamond Productions.

== Plot ==
Lucky Vincent is a gambler who, after a stretch of bad luck, owes more than $12,000 to mobster Solly Kramer. Lucky is rescued from Solly's goons by Daniel Hughes, a revivalist ex-con and his team of five trained Doberman Pinschers. After going undercover at a circus, Lucky persuades Daniel to work up an act with his dogs and join the carnival; when Lucky discovers that Solly and his gang intend to rob an armored car hauling the circus's box-office take, Daniel and his canine friends step forward to help thwart the plot. Along the way, Lucky also finds time to make romance with a beautiful circus performer named Justine Pirot.

== Cast ==
- Fred Astaire as Daniel Hughes
- James Franciscus as "Lucky" Vincent
- Barbara Eden as Justine Pirot
- Jack Carter as Solly
- Billy Barty as Samson
- Charlie Brill as Professor
- Parley Baer as Septimus, The Circus Owner
