= Martin Chuzzlewit =

1843–1844 novel by Charles Dickens

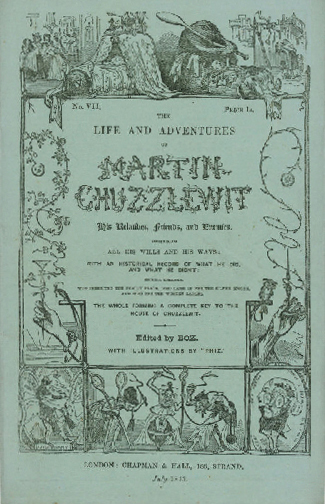
- Cover of serial edition seventh instalment, July 1843
- Author: Charles Dickens
- Original title: The Life and Adventures of Martin Chuzzlewit
- Illustrator: Hablot Knight Browne (Phiz)
- Language: English
- Genre: Novel
- Published: Serialised: January 1843 – July 1844; as a book 1844
- Publisher: Chapman & Hall
- Publication place: England
- Media type: Print (Serial, Hardback, and Paperback)
- Preceded by: Barnaby Rudge
- Followed by: Dombey and Son

The Life and Adventures of Martin Chuzzlewit (commonly known as Martin Chuzzlewit) is a novel by English author Charles Dickens, considered the last of his picaresque novels. It was originally serialised between January 1843 and July 1844. While he was writing it, Dickens told a friend that he thought it was his best work thus far, but it was one of his least popular novels, judged by sales of the monthly instalments. Characters in this novel gained fame, including Pecksniff and Mrs Gamp.

Like nearly all of Dickens's novels, Martin Chuzzlewit was first published in monthly instalments. Early sales of the monthly parts were lower than those of previous works, so Dickens changed the plot to send the title character to the United States. Dickens had visited America in 1842 in part as a failed attempt to get the US publishers to honour international copyright laws. He satirized the country as a place filled with self-promoting hucksters, eager to sell land sight unseen. He also unfavourably highlighted slavery and featured characters with racist attitudes and a propensity to violence. In later editions, and in his second visit 24 years later to a much-changed US, he made clear in a speech that it was satire and not a balanced image of the nation and then included that speech in all future editions.

The main theme of the novel, according to Dickens's preface, is selfishness, portrayed in a satirical fashion using all the members of the Chuzzlewit family. The novel is also notable for two of Dickens's great villains, Seth Pecksniff and Jonas Chuzzlewit. Dickens introduced one of the first literary private detective characters, Mr Nadgett, in this novel. It is dedicated to Angela Georgina Burdett-Coutts, a friend of Dickens.

== Plot summary ==
Martin Chuzzlewit has been raised by his grandfather and namesake. Years before, Old Martin took the precaution of raising an orphaned girl, Mary Graham, to be his companion and nursemaid, with the understanding that she would receive income from him only as long as Old Martin lives. Old Martin considers that this gives her a motive to keep him alive, in contrast to his relatives, who want to inherit his money. Young Martin falls in love with Mary and wishes to marry her, conflicting with Old Martin's plans. Young Martin and his grandfather argue, each too proud to yield to a resolution. Young Martin leaves home to live on his own, and Old Martin disinherits him.

Young Martin becomes an apprentice, at the late age of 21, to Seth Pecksniff, a relative and greedy architect. Instead of teaching his students, Pecksniff lives off their tuition fees and has them do draughting work that he passes off as his own. He has two spoiled daughters, Charity and Mercy, nicknamed Cherry and Merry. Pecksniff takes Young Martin on to establish closer ties with his wealthy grandfather.

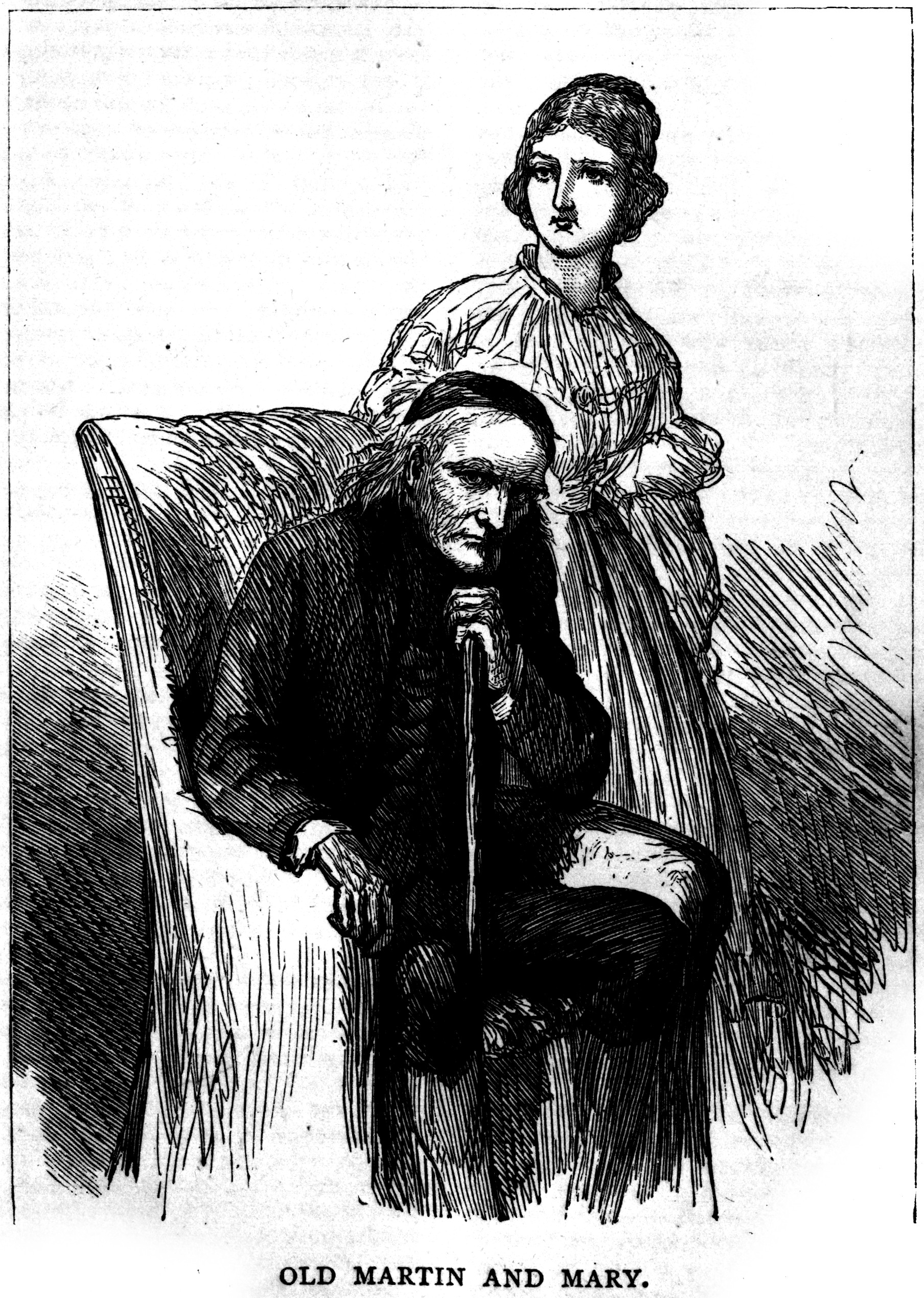
Old Martin and Mary

A Game of Love

Young Martin befriends Tom Pinch, a kind-hearted soul whose late grandmother gave Pecksniff all she had in the belief that Pecksniff would make an architect and a gentleman of him. Pinch is incapable of believing any of the bad things others tell him of Pecksniff and always defends him vociferously. He works for exploitatively low wages while believing that he is the unworthy recipient of Pecksniff's charity, rather than a man of many talents.

Young Martin spends one week at the house of Pecksniff, alone with Tom, as the family spends the week in London. Young Martin draws the designs for a school during that week. When Old Martin learns of his grandson's new life, he asks that Pecksniff kick him out. When Pecksniff returns, they argue and Young Martin leaves, once again to make his way alone. Soon, Old Martin and Mary arrive in the area; the former seems to fall under Pecksniff's control. During this time Pinch falls in love with Mary, who loves to hear him play the organ, but does not declare his feelings, both because of his shyness and because he knows she is attached to Young Martin. Pecksniff decides that Mary should be his next wife and rudely courts her.

Old Martin's brother, Anthony Chuzzlewit, is in business with his son, Jonas. Despite their considerable wealth, they are miserly and cruel. Jonas, eager for the old man to die so that he can inherit, constantly berates his father. Anthony dies abruptly and under suspicious circumstances, leaving his wealth to Jonas. Jonas then woos Cherry, while arguing constantly with Merry. He then abruptly declares to Pecksniff that he wants to marry Merry and jilts Cherry, not without demanding an additional £1,000 on top of the £4,000 that Pecksniff has promised him as Cherry's dowry, with the argument that Cherry has better chances for matchmaking.

Jonas becomes entangled with the unscrupulous Montague Tigg, formerly a petty thief and hanger-on of a Chuzzlewit relative, Chevy Slyme, and joins in Tigg's crooked insurance business. As Young Martin raises funds in London, Tigg cheats him at the pawn shop of the full value of his valuable pocket watch. Tigg uses the funds to transform himself into a con man with a new personal appearance, calls himself "Tigg Montague" and rents a fine office. This new image convinces investors that he is an important businessman from whom they may greatly profit.

At this time, Pecksniff, in front of Old Martin, orders Pinch out of his house. He does this after eavesdropping on a conversation between Tom and Mary, when Mary tells of Pecksniff's villainous designs on her. Pinch suddenly sees the true character of his employer and goes to London to seek new employment. He meets John Westlock, a good friend. Pinch rescues his sister Ruth from mistreatment by the family that employs her as a governess, and the two rent rooms in Islington. Pinch quickly receives an ideal job from a mysterious employer with the help of an equally mysterious Mr Fips.

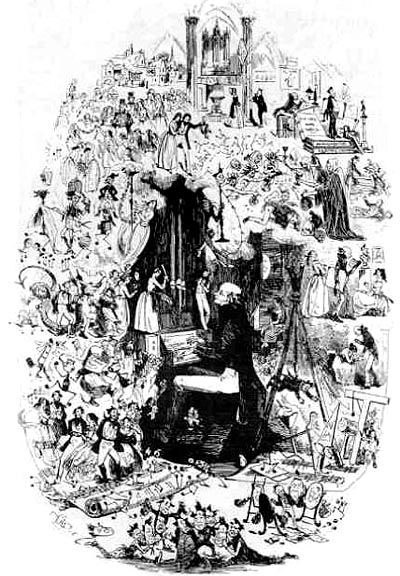
Tom Pinch at the Organ

John Westlock and Ruth Pinch

Meanwhile, Young Martin has encountered cheerful innkeeper Mark Tapley. Deciding his occupation does not reflect well on him because it shows no strength of character to be happy when one has good fortune, Mark heads to London to find a situation to test his cheerfulness by maintaining it in worse circumstances. To this end he accompanies Young Martin to the United States to seek their fortunes.

Young Martin believes the words of men in New York selling land unseen, along a major American river, thinking that place will need an architect for new buildings. Instead, he and Mark find a swampy, disease-filled, nearly empty settlement. Mark aids a couple who watch their children die in Eden. Young Martin, soon followed by Mark, falls ill of malaria. This grim experience changes Young Martin's selfish character, and he takes Mark's suggestion to apologize to his grandfather. The men return to England, where Young Martin seeks reconciliation with Old Martin, who is still with Pecksniff. In London, Young Martin reunites with Pinch and meets Westlock. Old Martin shows himself at Pinch's office, revealing himself as the mysterious employer. He has been pretending to be in thrall to Pecksniff, while keeping up with other, more important members of his extended family.

While Young Martin was in America, a witness came forward to Westlock who believed Jonas had killed Anthony, using drugs the witness gave him in trade for erasing a gambling debt. Chuffey, who survives his master Anthony, had seen the drugs and prevented Jonas from using them on his father, who died a natural death. The police, including Slyme, have discovered the body of Tigg Montague and have the benefit of the information gathered by Montague's investigator, Nadgett, to know the murderer. At the home shared by Jonas, Merry and Mr Chuffey, the police and Old Martin confront Jonas. Jonas is saved of the charge of murdering his father by Chuffey's story. He is taken for the murder of Montague, who had fooled him and taken his money. Old Martin takes Merry under his protection, as she was an abused wife, with none of her happy ways left.

Old Martin, with his grandson, Mary and Pinch, confront Pecksniff with their knowledge of his true character. Pecksniff has lost all his funds, as he was taken in by Jonas and Montague. Only his eldest daughter, a shrew who had been jilted on her wedding day, is left to him. Old Martin reveals that he was angry at Young Martin for becoming engaged to Mary because he had planned to arrange that particular match himself, and felt that his glory had been thwarted by their action. Young Martin and his grandfather are reconciled, and Young Martin and Mary are married, as are Ruth Pinch and John Westlock, another former student of Pecksniff. Pinch remains in unrequited love with Mary for the rest of his life, never marrying, and always being a warm companion to Mary, Martin, Ruth and John, who now knows his value and his skills.

== Characters ==
=== Extended Chuzzlewit family ===
Seth Pecksniff is a widower with two daughters, who is a self-styled teacher of architecture. He believes that he is a highly moral individual who loves his fellow man, but he mistreats his students and passes off their designs as his own for profit. He is said to be a cousin of old Martin Chuzzlewit. Pecksniff's rise and fall follows the novel's plot arc.

Mr Pecksniff with members of the Chuzzlewit family.

Martin Chuzzlewit the Younger With Mark Tapley

Charity and Mercy Pecksniff are the two daughters of Mr Pecksniff. They are also known as Cherry and Merry, or as the two Miss Pecksniffs. Charity is portrayed throughout the book as having none of that virtue after which she is named, while Mercy, the younger sister, is at first laughing and girlish, though later events drastically change her outlook on life.

Old Martin Chuzzlewit, the wealthy patriarch of the Chuzzlewit family, lives in constant suspicion of the financial designs of his extended family. At the beginning of the novel he travels with Mary, an orphan he raised, who is his companion and caretaker. She receives an income while he is alive and is not named in his will; he feels this motivates her to keep him alive. Later in the story, with Mary still his companion, he makes an apparent alliance with Pecksniff, who, he believes, is at least consistent in character. His own true character is revealed by the end of the story.

Young Martin Chuzzlewit is the grandson of old Martin Chuzzlewit. He is the closest relative of old Martin, and has inherited much of the stubbornness and selfishness of the old man. Young Martin is the protagonist of the story. He is 21 years old at the start, and older than the usual apprentice to an architect. His engagement to Mary is the cause of estrangement between himself and his grandfather. By the end of the story he is a reformed character, having realised and repented of the selfishness of his previous actions.

Anthony Chuzzlewit is the brother of old Martin. He and his son, Jonas, run a business called Chuzzlewit and Son. They are both self-serving, hardened individuals who view the accumulation of money as the most important thing in life.

Jonas Chuzzlewit is the mean-spirited, sinisterly jovial son of Anthony Chuzzlewit. He views his father with contempt and wishes for his death, so that he can have the business and the money for himself. He tried to hasten the old man's death, but his father's friend intervened. He is a suitor of the two Miss Pecksniffs, wins one, then is driven to commit murder by his unscrupulous business associations.

Mr and Mrs Spottletoe are the nephew-in-law and niece of old Martin Chuzzlewit, Mrs Spottletoe being the daughter of old Martin's brother. She was also once the favourite of old Martin, but they have since fallen out.

George Chuzzlewit is a bachelor cousin of old Martin.

=== Characters in England ===
Thomas (Tom) Pinch is a former student of Pecksniff's who has become his personal assistant. He is kind, simple and honest in everything he does, serving as a foil to Pecksniff. He carries in his heart an extreme loyalty and admiration for Pecksniff until he discovers Pecksniff's true nature through his treatment of Mary, whom Pinch has come to love. Because Tom Pinch plays such a large role in the story he is sometimes considered the novel's true protagonist. He started as an apprentice long ago, and is 35 years old when he leaves to start a new life in London.

Ruth Pinch is Tom Pinch's sister. She is sweet and good like her brother, and she is beautiful. At first she works as a governess to a wealthy family, but later she and Tom set up home together. She falls in love with, and marries, Tom's friend John Westlock.

Mark Tapley, the good-humoured employee of the Blue Dragon Inn and suitor of Mrs Lupin, the landlady of the inn, leaves to find work that might be more of a credit to his character: that is, work sufficiently miserable that his cheerfulness will be more of a credit to him. He eventually joins young Martin Chuzzlewit on his trip to the United States, where he finds at last a situation that requires the full extent of his innate cheerfulness. Martin buys a piece of land in a settlement called Eden, which is in the midst of a malarial swamp. Mark nurses Martin through illness and they eventually return to England. Mark is a few years older than Martin.

Montague Tigg with Jonas (Mr Nadgett Breathes, as Usual, an Atmosphere of Mystery).

Montague Tigg / Tigg Montague is a down-on-his-luck rogue at the beginning of the story, and a hanger-on to a Chuzzlewit cousin named Chevy Slyme. Later Tigg starts the Anglo-Bengalee Disinterested Loan and Life Assurance Company, which pays off early policyholders' claims with premiums from more recent policyholders. Tigg lures Jonas into the business.

John Westlock ends his 5 years training under Pecksniff as the story opens. His comments about Pecksniff reveal that architect's real character to the reader. He is great friends with Tom Pinch. Soon after he leaves Pecksniff, Westlock comes into his inheritance, and he lives in London. After Tom Pinch moves to London, John serves as a mentor and companion to Tom and his sister. He falls in love with and eventually marries Ruth Pinch.

Mr Nadgett is a soft-spoken, mysterious individual who is Tom Pinch's landlord and serves as Montague's private investigator. He is hired to investigate the private lives of potential clients whom Montague hopes to defraud. It has been claimed that he is the first private investigator in fiction.

Sarah Gamp (also known as Sairey or Mrs Gamp) is an alcoholic who works as a midwife, a monthly nurse and a layer-out of the dead. Even in a house of mourning Mrs Gamp manages to enjoy all the hospitality the house can afford, with little regard for the person she is there to minister to, and she is often much the worse for drink. She constantly refers to a Mrs Harris, who is "a phantom of Mrs Gamp's brain ... created for the express purpose of holding visionary dialogues with her on all manner of subjects, and invariably winding up with a compliment to the excellence of her nature". Mrs Gamp habitually carries with her a battered black umbrella: so popular with the Victorian public was the character that Gamp became a slang word for an umbrella in general. It is believed that the character was based on a real nurse described to Dickens by his friend Angela Burdett-Coutts.

Mary Graham is the companion of old Martin Chuzzlewit, who has told her that she will receive nothing from him in his will. She is a beautiful young woman who is loving and loyal. Mary and young Martin Chuzzlewit fall in love. The two lovers are separated by the argument between grandfather and grandson. They are eventually reunited.

Mr Chuffey is Anthony Chuzzlewit's old clerk and lifelong companion. Chuffey protects Anthony from his son Jonas.

Bailey is a boy employed first by Mrs Todgers, then by the fraudster Montague Tigg. He is reported to have suffered a fatal head injury in falling out of a cabriolet, though he eventually recovers.

Mrs. Todgers owns the inn or boarding house where the Pecksniffs stay when in London. As it is for male guests only, she houses Charity and Mercy in her own suite of rooms.

=== Characters in America ===
Jefferson Brick is a war correspondent in The New York Rowdy Journal. He typifies the bluster written in American newspapers, which publish every speech made by a local, and have poor knowledge of the world beyond America. He is a caricature of youthful, raucous journalism which Dickens had experienced when visiting America in 1842, such as the New York Herald of the real-life Gordon Bennett.

Mr. Bevan is the kind and level-headed American man who meets Martin on his arrival in New York. He aids Martin in returning to England.

== Themes ==
The main theme of the novel, according to Dickens's preface, is selfishness, portrayed in a satirical fashion using all the members of the Chuzzlewit family.

In keeping with the theme of greed and selfishness in this novel, the Christmas story Dickens published in December 1843, as this novel was being serialized, was A Christmas Carol.

== Dedication ==
This novel is dedicated to Angela Georgina Burdett-Coutts, a friend of Dickens.

== Publication ==
Martin Chuzzlewit was published in 19 monthly instalments, each comprising 32 pages of text and two illustrations by Phiz and costing one shilling. The last part was double-length.

- I – January 1843 (chapters 1–3)
- II – February 1843 (chapters 4–5)
- III – March 1843 (chapters 6–8)
- IV – April 1843 (chapters 9–10)
- V – May 1843 (chapters 11–12)
- VI – June 1843 (chapters 13–15)
- VII – July 1843 (chapters 16–17)
- VIII – August 1843 (chapters 18–20)
- IX – September 1843 (chapters 21–23)
- X – October 1843 (chapters 24–26)
- XI – November 1843 (chapters 27–29)
- XII – December 1843 (chapters 30–32)
- XIII – January 1844 (chapters 33–35)
- XIV – February 1844 (chapters 36–38)
- XV – March 1844 (chapters 39–41)
- XVI – April 1844 (chapters 42–44)
- XVII – May 1844 (chapters 45–47)
- XVIII – June 1844 (chapters 48–50)
- XIX-XX – July 1844 (chapters 51–54)

The early monthly numbers were not as successful as Dickens's previous work and sold about 20,000 copies each, as compared to 40,000 to 50,000 for the monthly numbers of the Pickwick Papers and Nicholas Nickleby, and 60,000 to 70,000 for the weekly issues of Barnaby Rudge and The Old Curiosity Shop. The lack of success of the novel caused a rift between Dickens and his publishers Chapman and Hall when they invoked a penalty clause in his contract requiring him to pay back money they had lent him to cover their costs.

Dickens responded to the disappointing early sales of the monthly parts compared to sales of previous works as monthly instalments; he changed the plot to send the title character to the United States. This allowed the author to portray the United States, which he had visited in 1842, satirically, as a near-wilderness with pockets of civilisation filled with deceitful and self-promoting hucksters.

Dickens's satire of American modes and manners in the novel won him no friends on the other side of the Atlantic, where the instalments containing the offending chapters were greeted with a "frenzy of wrath". As a consequence Dickens received abusive mail and newspaper clippings from the United States.

== Satire of 1840s America ==
The novel has been seen by some Americans as unfairly critical of the United States, although Dickens himself wrote it as satire similar in spirit to his "attacks" on certain people and particular institutions in his native England, in novels such as Oliver Twist. Dickens was serious about reforms in his home country and is credited with achieving changes, notably in the workhouse system and child labour. Such satirical depictions by him and other authors contributed to the call for legislative reform.

Fraud in selling land sight unseen was shown as a common event in the United States of the 1840s. Most Americans were satirically portrayed: they proclaim their equality and their love of freedom and egalitarianism at every opportunity. Those who have travelled to England claim to have been received only by aristocrats. One character, Mr Bevan, is the voice of reason with a balanced view of his nation and a useful friend to Martin and Mark. Another American character, Mrs Hominy, described the United States as "so maimed and lame, so full of sores and ulcers, foul to the eye and almost hopeless to the sense, that her best friends turn from the loathsome creature with disgust".

Dickens attacks the institution of slavery in the United States in the following words: "Thus the stars wink upon the bloody stripes; and Liberty pulls down her cap upon her eyes, and owns oppression in its vilest aspect for her sister." The institution of slavery had not been practised in England since the 12th century and Britain outlawed the slave trade in the British Empire in 1807 and provided for the gradual abolition of slavery in most parts of the British Empire in 1833, so the sight of slaves and the still lively debates on keeping or abolishing the practice in the US were an easy stimulant for satire by an English writer.

George L. Rives wrote that "It is perhaps not too much to say that the publication of Martin Chuzzlewit did more than almost any other one thing to drive the United States and England in the direction of war" over the Oregon boundary dispute, which was eventually resolved via diplomacy rather than war.

In 1868, Dickens returned to the US and at a banquet in his honour hosted by the press in New York City, delivered an after-dinner speech in which he acknowledged the positive transformation which the United States had undergone and apologized for his previous negative reaction on his visit decades before. Furthermore, he announced that he would have the speech appended to each future edition of American Notes and Martin Chuzzlewit, and the volumes have been emended as such in all successive publications.

== Adaptations and references ==
In 1844 the novel was adapted into a stage play at the Queen's Theatre, featuring Thomas Manders in drag as Sarah Gamp. Short film adaptations of the novel were released in 1912, produced by Thomas A. Edison, Inc., and in 1914, produced by the Biograph Company.

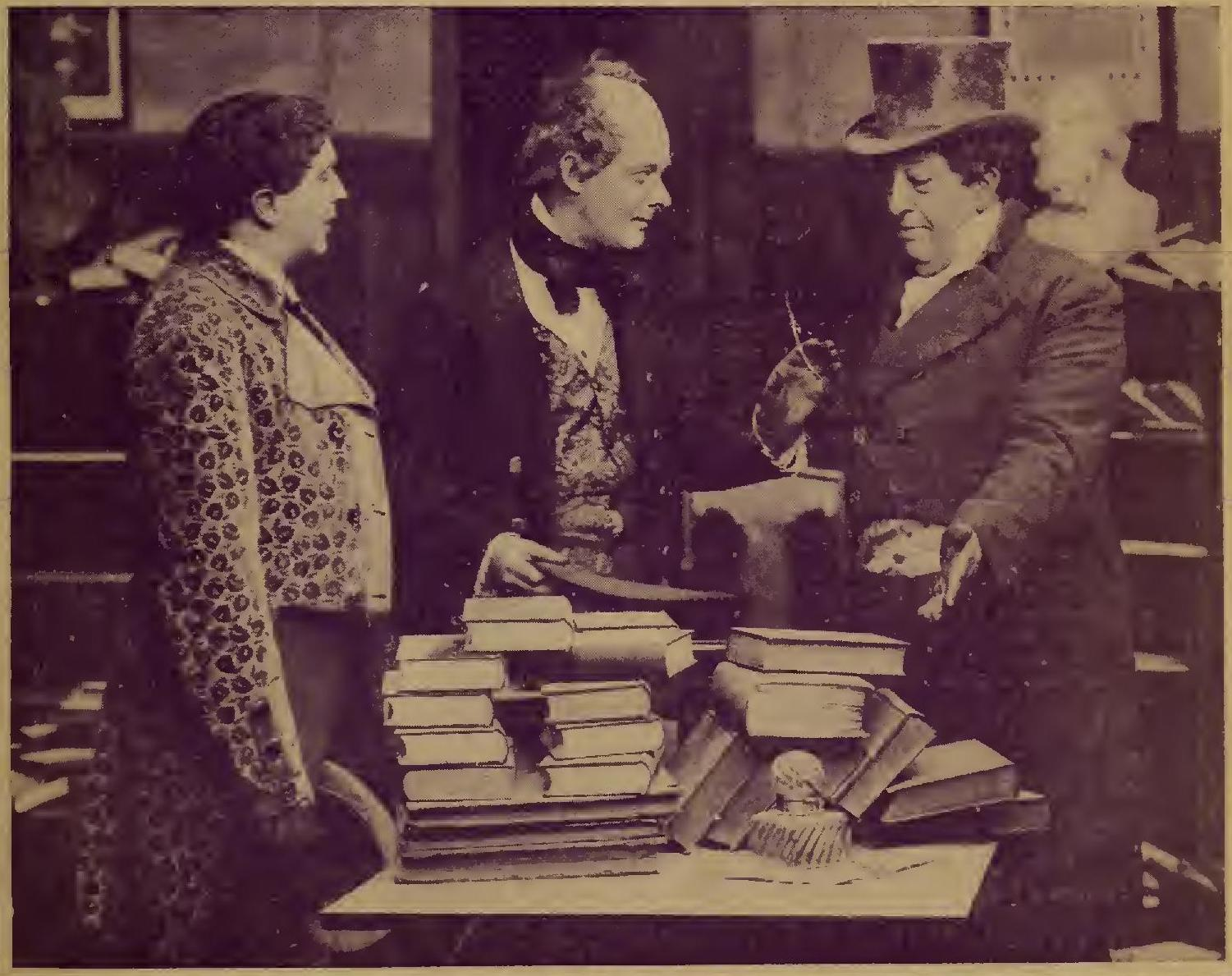
1912 Martin Chuzzlewit film ad in The Motion Picture Story Magazine

The first stage performance in the 20th century came in 1993 at the Royal Theatre Northampton. Adapted by Lyn Robertson Hay and directed by Michael Napier Brown, the production starred singer Aled Jones and featured Katharine Schlesinger and Colin Atkins.

1993 stage production of Martin Chuzzlewit at the Royal Theatre Northampton

The novel has been adapted four times by the BBC

- 1954, as a twelve-part serial in the BBC Home Service starring Donald Wolfit as Mr. Pecksniff, Devid Peel as Martin and Andrew Cruikshank as Old Martin
- 1964, as a thirteen-part serial on BBC One starring Barry Jones as Old Martin, Gary Raymond as Martin and Richard Pearson as Mr. Pecksniff
- 1987, as a ten-part serial on BBC Radio 4 starring Patrick Troughton as Old Martin, Christopher Benjamin as Mr. Pecksniff and Valentine Pelka as Martin
- 1994, as a six-part television miniseries on BBC Two starring Paul Scofield as Old Martin/Anthony Chuzzlewit and Pete Postlethwaite as Tigg Montague.

== Sources ==
- Bowen, John (2003), Other Dickens: Pickwick to Chuzzlewit, Oxford: Oxford University Press, ISBN 978-0-19-926140-6
- Jordan, John O (2001), The Cambridge Companion to Charles Dickens, New York: Cambridge University Press, ISBN 9780521669641
- Pearson, Hesketh (1949), Dickens, London: Methuen
- Purchase, Sean (2006). "'Speaking of Them as a Body': Dickens, Slavery and 'Martin Chuzzlewit'". Critical Survey. 18 (1): 1–16. doi:10.3167/001115706780810735. ISBN 9780521669641. JSTOR 41556146.
- Sulfridge, Cynthia (1979). "Martin Chuzzlewit: Dickens's Prodigal and the Myth of the Wandering Son". Studies in the Novel. 11 (3): 318–325. JSTOR 29531984.
- Tambling, Jeremy (2001), Lost in the American city: Dickens, James, and Kafka, New York: Palgrave, ISBN 978-0-312-29263-8
