= Snow Treasure (film) =

1968 American adventure film

- Directed by: Irving Jacoby
- Written by: Marie McSwigan (novel); Peter E. Hansen; Irving Jacoby
- Produced by: Irving Jacoby
- Starring: James Franciscus; Ilona Rodgers; Tor Stokke
- Cinematography: Sverre Bergli
- Edited by: Ralph Sheldon
- Music by: Egil Monn-Iversen
- Production company: Sagittarius Productions
- Distributed by: Allied Artists Pictures
- Release date: October 4, 1968
- Running time: 95 minutes
- Country: United States
- Language: English

Snow Treasure is a 1968 American adventure film directed by Irving Jacoby and starring James Franciscus, Ilona Rodgers and Tor Stokke. It is based on the 1942 novel Snow Treasure by Marie McSwigan, set during the German occupation of Norway during World War II.

It was shot in Norway. The film's sets were designed by the art director Grethe Hejer.

== Plot ==
Peter Lundstrom wants to be involved in helping his father, Lars, and uncle, Victor, against the Nazis who have invaded their country, Norway. As the Germans take over the village of Riswyk, Peter discovers a cave of gold. He knows this gold will help Norway, and he devises a plan to take it from the cave to the shore, where his uncle will take it to a safe location. He knows he will be able to transport the gold without being detected, as the Germans do not stop children at the checkpoints, only adults.

Peter then discovers he cannot do this alone as it will take too long, and the snow is melting, which means he doesn't have much time left to ski with the gold. Peter recruits a number of village children to help him, and each day they ski as many bars of gold as they can down to a clearing, where they build a pile of ingots and a snowman surrounding them. At night, under cover of darkness, Uncle Victor collects the gold and takes it to his camouflaged boat. With the help of the children, almost all of the gold is transferred before they believe they are spotted.

A German officer, Lieutenant Kalasch, chases Peter and his friend one day and lets himself be captured. While in captivity, he expresses his wish to defect and get to safety. He then goes with Uncle Victor to the boat, where he is held as a willing prisoner. Peter and the children take the last trip of gold from the cave but meet up with German soldiers in the clearing. One soldier begins destroying the snowman with the gold hidden inside, so Peter throws a snowball to distract the soldier. The soldiers all chase after Peter and he is captured and taken to a makeshift prison at the town hall. Uncle Victor and Kalasch agree that Kalasch will break Peter out of prison so he can go with Uncle Victor and the gold.

In the escape, Kalasch is shot, but makes it to the boat, where he succumbs to his injury. Peter and Uncle Victor make it out of Norway and are headed to England with the gold to help the Allies.

== Cast ==
- James Franciscus as 2nd Lt. H. Kalasch
- Ilona Rodgers as Bente Nielsen, Victor's Girl
- Tor Stokke as Lars Lundstrom, Peter's Father
- Roald Øyen as Victor Lundstrom
- Paul Austad as Peter Lundstrom
- Tina Austad as Peter's Sister
- Wilfred Breistrand as Captain Kantzeler
- Randi Kolstad as Inger Lundstrom, Peter's Mother

== Bibliography ==
- Goble, Alan. The Complete Index to Literary Sources in Film. Walter de Gruyter, 1999.
