= Tor Stokke =

Norwegian actor (1928–2003)

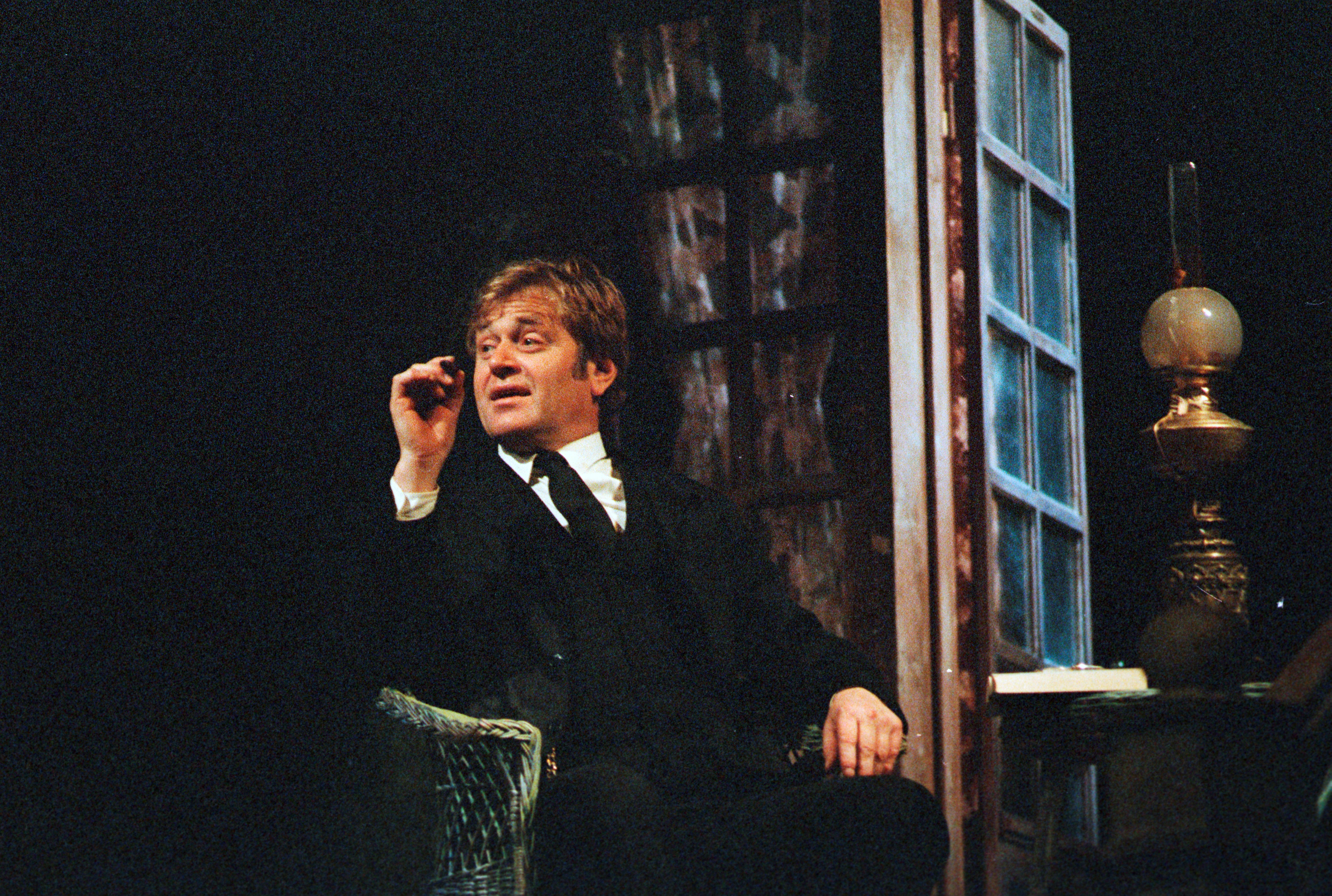
- Born: 23 August 1928; Trondheim, Norway
- Died: 13 June 2003 (aged 74); Norway
- Occupation: Actor
- Years active: 1956-1992

Tor Stokke (23 August 1928 – 13 June 2003) was a Norwegian actor and voice actor. He appeared in 27 films between 1956 and 1992. He is the father of actress Linn Stokke.

== Selected filmography ==
- 1958: I slik en natt as a policeman
- 1959: The Chasers
- 1960: Struggle for Eagle Peak
- 1961: Et øye på hver finger
- 1968: Snow Treasure
- 1971: Love Is War
- 1977: Kosmetikkrevolusjonen
- 1988: Codename: Kyril

== Selected filmography (Norwegian dubbing) ==
- 1981: The Fox and the Hound, (Amos Slade)
- 1983: Snow White and the Seven Dwarfs, (Huntsman, both norwegian dubbings)
- 1986: An American Tail, (Moe)
- 1989: Lady and the Tramp, (Joe, Professor and the Doctor)
- 1994: The Swan Princess, (King William)
- 1994: The Aristocats, (Georges Hautecourt, 2nd norwegian dubbing)
- 2001: Atlantis: The Lost Empire, (Fenton Q. Harcourt)
