= Sarah Gamp =

Fictional character in a Charles Dickens novel

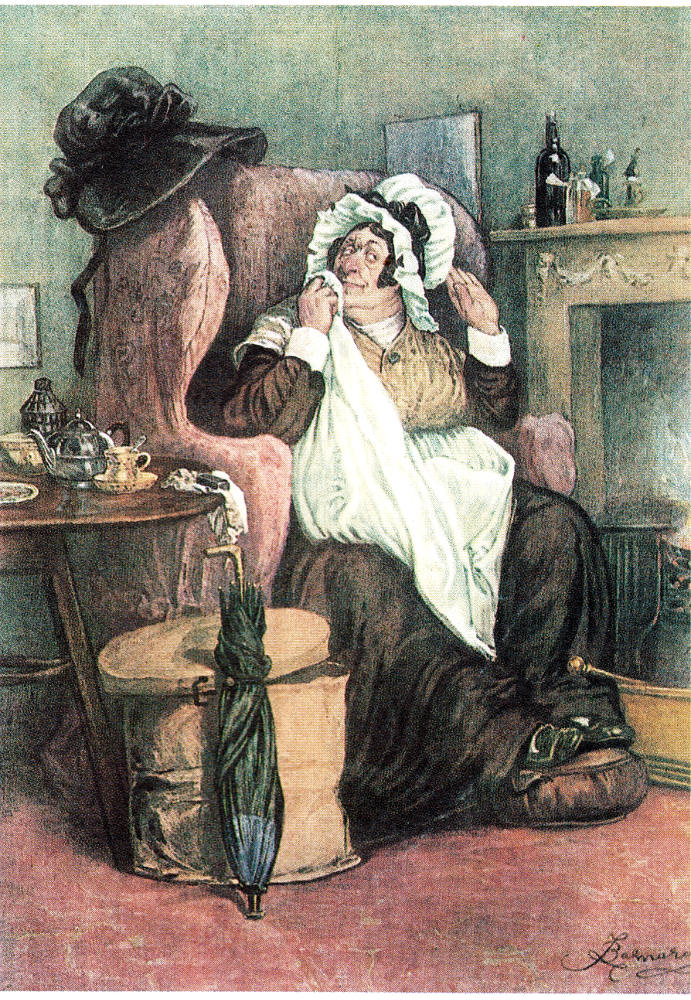
As illustrated by Frederick Barnard

Sarah or Sairey Gamp, Mrs. Gamp as she is more commonly known, is a nurse in the novel Martin Chuzzlewit by Charles Dickens, first published as a serial in 1843–1844.

Mrs. Gamp is dissolute, sloppy and generally drunk. In her long, rambling speeches, she refers constantly to her friend Mrs. Harris as support for her questionable practices. It becomes clear that no such person exists other than as a figment of her imagination. She became a notorious stereotype of untrained and incompetent nurses of the early Victorian era, before the reforms of campaigners like Florence Nightingale.

The caricature was popular with the British public. A type of umbrella became known as a gamp because Mrs. Gamp always carries one, which she displays with "particular ostentation". The character was based upon a nurse described to Dickens by his friend, Angela Burdett-Coutts.

== Adaptations and other works ==
In an 1844 stage version of Martin Chuzzlewit authorised by Dickens at the Queen's Theatre Sarah Gamp was played by the actor and comedian Thomas Manders. Mrs. Gamp appears in Dickensian, at first nursing Little Nell at the Old Curiosity Shop and later tending to Silas Wegg (from Our Mutual Friend) played by Pauline Collins. Nobel laureate William Faulkner considered Gamp among his favourite characters in popular literature.
