= James Franciscus =

American actor (1934–1991)

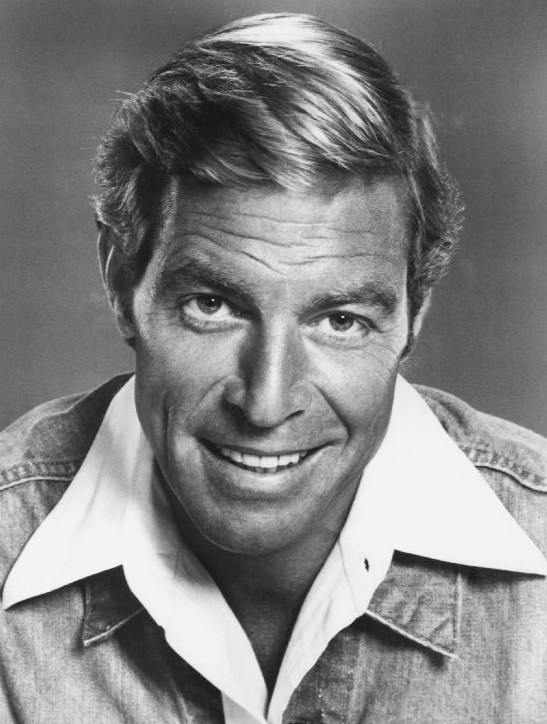
- Franciscus in 1977
- Born: James Grover Franciscus; January 31, 1934; Clayton, Missouri, U.S.
- Died: July 8, 1991 (aged 57); North Hollywood, California, U.S.
- Other name: James Francicus
- Education: Yale University
- Years active: 1957–1991
- Spouses: Kathleen Wellman (m. 1960; div. 1977) Carla Ankney (m. 1980)
- Children: 4

James Grover Franciscus (January 31, 1934 – July 8, 1991) was an American actor, known for his roles in feature films and in six television series: Mr. Novak, Naked City, The Investigators, Longstreet, Doc Elliot, and Hunter.

== Life and career ==
Franciscus was born in Clayton, Missouri, to Lorraine (née Grover) and John Allen Franciscus, who was killed during World War II when James was nine. In 1957, Franciscus received a Bachelor of Arts degree in English and theatre arts from Yale University in New Haven, Connecticut, where he graduated magna cum laude. He was a classmate of Dick Cavett and Bill Hinnant. At Yale, he joined Delta Kappa Epsilon fraternity.

His first major role was as Detective Jim Halloran in the half-hour version of ABC's Naked City. Franciscus guest starred on the CBS military comedy-drama Hennesey, starring Jackie Cooper, and on the NBC drama about family conflicts in the American Civil War titled The Americans. CBS soon cast him in the lead in the 13-week series The Investigators, which aired from October 5 to December 28, 1961. He played the insurance investigator Russ Andrews, with James Philbrook as a co-star. Franciscus was also cast in the role of Tom Grover in the 1961 episode "The Empty Heart" of the CBS anthology series The DuPont Show with June Allyson. He performed in many feature films and television programs throughout the 1960s and 1970s, preceded by a minor role in an episode of The Twilight Zone titled "Judgment Night" in 1959, and a major role in episodes of Alfred Hitchcock Presents: "Forty Detectives Later" in 1960 and "Summer Shade" in 1961.

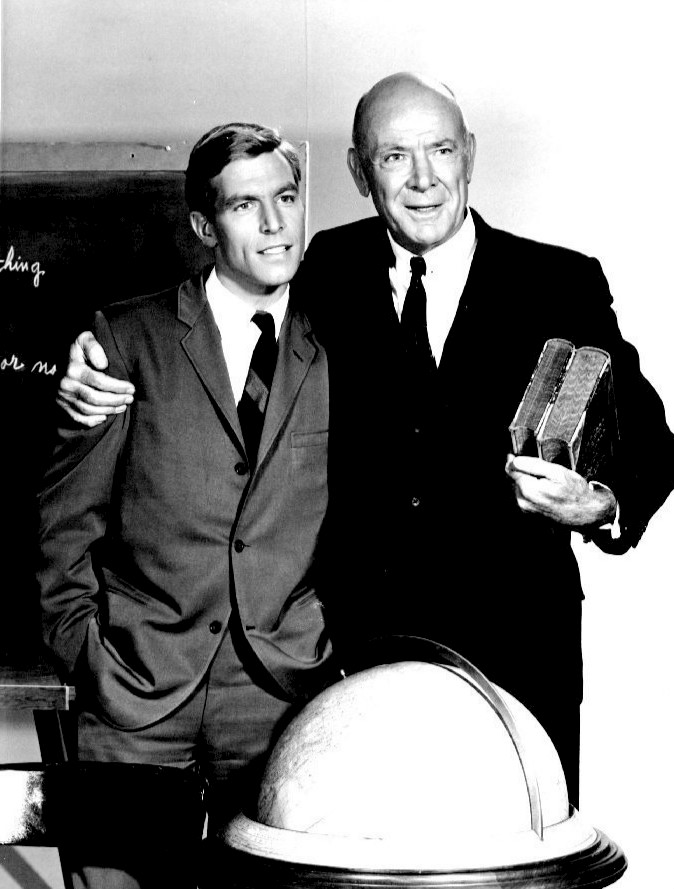
Franciscus and Dean Jagger from the television series Mr. Novak

He starred in I Passed for White (1960), and in 1963, he appeared as Mike Norris in the episode "Hang by One Hand" on the NBC medical drama about psychiatry, The Eleventh Hour. He also guest-starred on Combat!, The F.B.I. and Miracle of the White Stallions. Franciscus may be best remembered for his title roles in NBC's Mr. Novak (1963–65) and ABC's Longstreet (1971–72) which included his blind character taking martial arts lessons in Jeet Kune Do from Bruce Lee as Li Tsung in four episodes, and for his vocal performance in the movie version of Jonathan Livingston Seagull (1973). Along with Lloyd Bridges, he served as host of the syndicated series Waterworld, which aired from 1972 to 1975. In 1977, he starred in his fifth television series, the short-lived Hunter, as a secret agent.

He was also frequently seen in feature films of the 1960s and 1970s such as Youngblood Hawke, Snow Treasure, The Amazing Dobermans, Marooned, Beneath the Planet of the Apes, City on Fire, When Time Ran Out, The Valley of Gwangi, and The Greek Tycoon. Over the years, Franciscus found film work with Italian cinema. In 1971, he accepted the lead role in Dario Argento's film The Cat o' Nine Tails. In 1979, he appeared in Antonio Margheriti's Killer Fish, and in 1980, he starred in director Enzo G. Castellari's Jaws-inspired Great White (aka The Last Shark).

He continued appearing in roles on the screen and television. When less important roles were offered, Franciscus turned to writing screenplays and producing. In 1991, the year of his death, he worked as an associate producer and screenwriter on the film 29th Street starring Anthony LaPaglia and Danny Aiello; it was his final project.

== Personal life and death ==
In the summer of 1956, while working as the stage manager at the Cape Playhouse in Dennis, Massachusetts, Franciscus dated Jane Fonda. In her autobiography My Life So Far (2005), Fonda identifies Franciscus as the boy to whom she lost her virginity.

On March 28, 1960, Franciscus married Kathleen "Kitty" Wellman, a daughter of film director William A. Wellman. They had four children — Jamie, Kellie, Korie, and Jolie. After the couple's divorce, he married Carla Ankney in 1980. They were still married at the time of Franciscus's 1991 death from emphysema in North Hollywood, California, at 57.

== Filmography ==
=== Film ===
Year	Title	Role	Notes
1957	Four Boys and a Gun	Johnny Doyle	
1958	The Mugger	Eddie Baxter	
1960	I Passed for White	Rick Leyton	
1961	The Outsider	Private James B. Sorenson	
1963	Miracle of the White Stallions	Major Hoffman	
1964	Youngblood Hawke	Youngblood Hawke	
1968	Snow Treasure	Second Lieutenant H. Kalasch	
1969	The Valley of Gwangi	Tuck Kirby	
1969	Marooned	Clayton Stone	
1969	The Great Sex War	Unknown	
1970	Hell Boats	Lieutenant Commander Jeffords, R.N.V.R.	
1970	Beneath the Planet of the Apes	Brent	
1970	Seeds of Discovery	Presenter	Documentary film
1971	The Cat o' Nine Tails	Carlo Giordani	
1971	Kidnapped	—N/a	Uncredited producer
1973	Jonathan Livingston Seagull	Jonathan Livingston Seagull (voice)	
1974	Aloha Means Goodbye	Dr. Lawrence Maddox	
1976	The Amazing Dobermans	Lucky	
1978	Good Guys Wear Black	Conrad Morgan	
1978	The Greek Tycoon	President James Cassidy	
1979	Concorde Affaire '79	Moses Brody	
1979	City on Fire	Jimbo	
1979	Killer Fish	Paul Diller	
1980	When Time Ran Out...	Bob Spangler	
1980	Nightkill	Steve Fulton	
1981	The Last Shark	Peter Benton	
1982	Butterfly	Moke Blue	
1983	Great Transport	John Mason	
1991	29th Street	—N/a	Associate producer and story writer

=== Television ===
Year	Title	Role	Notes
1957	Studio One	Brass	Episode: "A Walk in the Forest"
1958	Studio One	Brass	Episode: "A Walk in the Forest"
1958	Studio One	Norstad	Episode: "Kurishiki Incident"
1958	Studio One	Johnny	Episode: "The Strong Man"
1958	Have Gun – Will Travel	Tom Nelson	Episode: "Deliver the Body"
1958	The Silent Service	Lieutenant John R. Bertrand	Episode: "The Bowfin Story"
1958–1959	Naked City	Detective Jimmy Halloran	Main role; 39 episodes
1959	Tales of Wells Fargo	Joe Braddock	Episode: "The Stage Line"
1959	Westinghouse Desilu Playhouse	Clay Darrow	Episode: "Six Guns for Donegan"
1959	Whirlybirds	Jerry Lambert / Tom Drake	Episode: "Dead Wrong"
1959	The Twilight Zone	Lieutenant Mueller	Episode: "Judgment Night"
1959	Father Knows Best	Bill Shappard	Episode: "Bud, the Willing Worker"
1959	The Rifleman	Philip Simmons	Episode: "The Legacy"
1959	Death Valley Days	Mike Ward	Episode: "Lady of the Press"
1960	The Millionaire	Tom Doane	Episode: "The Story of Margaret Stoneham"
1960	Wagon Train	John Colter	Episode: "The Benjamin Burns Story"
1960	Hennesey	Williams	Episode: "The Annapolis Man"
1960	Black Saddle	Quinn Jackson	Episode: "The Penalty"
1960	Alfred Hitchcock Presents	William Tyre	Season 5 Episode 28: "Forty Detectives Later"
1960	Rawhide	Andy Nye	S2:E28, "Incident of the Murder Steer"
1960	The Deputy	William Emerson Stanhope / Billy Bart	Episode: "Mother and Son"
1961	Alfred Hitchcock Presents	Ben Kendall	Season 6 Episode 15: "Summer Shade"
1961	The DuPont Show with June Allyson	Tom Grover	Episode: "The Guilty Heart"
1961	General Electric Theater	Bill Taylor	Episode: "Love Is a Lion's Roar"
1961	The Americans	Lieutenant Hannon	Episode: "The Invaders"
1961	The Investigators	Russ Andrews	Main role; 13 episodes
1962	Ben Casey	John Wickware	Episode: "So Oft It Chances in Particular Men"
1963	Dr. Kildare	Stan Fisher	Episode: "Jail Ward"
1963	The Eleventh Hour	Mike Norris	Episode: "Hang by One Hand"
1963–1965	Mr. Novak	John Novak	Main role; 60 episodes
1965	Bob Hope Presents the Chrysler Theatre	Larry Martin	Episode: "Escape into Jeopardy"
1966	12 O'Clock High	Captain Tom Carpenter	Episode: "Cross-Hairs on Death"
1966	Combat!	Private First Class Charles Harris	Episode: "Decision"
1967	The F.B.I.	Charles Burnett	Episode: "Force of Nature"
1968	Judd, for the Defense	Father William Chitwood	Episode: "The Devil's Surrogate"
1968	Shadow Over Elveron	Dr. Matthew Tregaskis	Television film
1968	The F.B.I.	Mitchell Flynn	Episode: "Out of Control"
1968	Heidi	—N/a	Television film; also producer
1969	Trial Run	Louis Coleman	Television film
1970	Night Slaves	Clay Howard	Television film
1970	Jane Eyre	—N/a	Television film; also producer
1971–1972	Longstreet	Mike Longstreet	Main role; 24 episodes
1972	Ghost Story	Paul Dover	Episode: "At the Cradle Foot"
1973	The 500 Pound Jerk	Gil Davenport	Television film
1973	The Red Pony	—N/a	Television film; also producer
1973–1974	Doc Elliot	Dr. Benjamin Elliot	Main role; 15 episodes
1975	The Dream Makers	Sammy Stone	Television film
1975	The Trial of Chaplain Jensen	Chaplain Andrew Jensen	Television film
1975	Insight	The Psychiatrist	Episode: "The Man from Inner Space"
1975	A Girl Named Sooner	—N/a	Television film; also uncredited producer
1976	One of My Wives Is Missing	Daniel Corban	Television film
1976–1977	Hunter	James Hunter	Main role; 13 episodes
1977	The Man Inside	Rush	Television film
1978	Secrets of Three Hungry Wives	Mark Powers	Television film
1978	The Pirate	Dick Carriage	Television film
1978	Puzzle	Harry Scott	Television film
1981	Jacqueline Bouvier Kennedy	President John F. Kennedy	Television film
1985	Secret Weapons	Colonel Victor Khudenko	Television film
