= Sonya Wilde =

American actress

- Born: November 2, 1937 (age 88)
- Occupation: Former actress
- Years active: 1960-1962
- Spouse: Jake Butcher (m. 1962)
- Children: 4

Sonya Wilde (born November 2, 1937) is an American former actress, best known for her starring role in the 1960 film I Passed for White. She started her career as Maria on Broadway with the original cast of West Side Story.

== Career ==
On Broadway, Wilde was an understudy and replacement in the role of Maria in West Side Story (1957).

== Selected filmography ==
- I Passed for White (1960)

== Selected television ==
- Bonanza (1960)
- Cheyenne (1960)
- The Americans (1961)
- Gunslinger (1961)
- Perry Mason (1961)
- Rawhide (1961) – White Deer in S4:E5, "The Lost Tribe"
- Death Valley Days (1960)

== Private life ==
In 1962, Wilde married the banker Jake Butcher, having met him on New Year's Eve 1961 on a blind date. He later became a politician, before spending seven years in prison for fraud. They had four children.

Following her husband's 1985 20-year jail term for bank fraud (he served seven years), Wilde went to court in 1986 to try to keep the family's $675,000 home in the exclusive Sweetwater Club subdivision just outside Orlando.
