= Abolitionist children's literature =

Literature of the movement to end slavery

Abolitionist children’s literature includes works written for children by authors committed to the movement to end slavery. It aimed to instill in young readers an understanding of slavery, racial hierarchies, sympathy for the enslaved, and a desire for emancipation. A variety of literary forms were used by abolitionist children’s authors including, short stories, poems, songs, nursery rhymes and dialogues, much of it written by white women. Pamphlets, picture books and periodicals were the primary forms of abolitionist children’s literature, often using Biblical themes to reinforce the wickedness of slavery. Abolitionist children's literature was countered with pro-slavery material aimed at children, which attempted to depict slavery as a noble pursuit, and slaves as stupid and grateful, or evil.

== Fiction ==
General themes in abolitionist children’s fiction include: the sinfulness of slavery, the equality of Black and white people, the violence and cruelty of slavery and the helplessness of the enslaved. Authors of abolitionist children’s literature regularly employed biblical imagery, verse and theology to expose the sinfulness of slavery and to caution young readers from engaging in the sin of slavery. Abolitionist periodicals and pamphlets often contained prayers to be recited by children, which pleaded with God to bring about an end to slavery. These texts often appeal to the theological view that men cannot be owned by other men. Abolitionist children’s literature was often accompanied by imagery designed to evoke an emotional reaction and visually convey the central themes of the texts.

From the late 18th century, children’s literature was a vital tool for American abolitionists in the ideological war against slavery. The importance of changing children’s perceptions around slavery was widely understood to be crucial for the possibility of abolition. Various different approaches were taken in abolitionist children’s literature, and different degrees of radicalism are shown in the texts. The more radical texts attempt to embolden children to boycott products of slavery, join anti-slavery associations, and treat Black Americans as equals. The more conservative texts focus on slavery abroad and promote a gradualist approach to abolition. Biblical justifications for abolitionism are a strong thread in anti-slavery children’s literature; much of which was distributed in Sunday schools. Authors of anti-slavery children’s fiction, almost all of whom were white, grappled with notions of race and hierarchy in their writing. Many abolitionist children’s texts portray the slave as submissive and helpless, as opposed to heroic white emancipators.

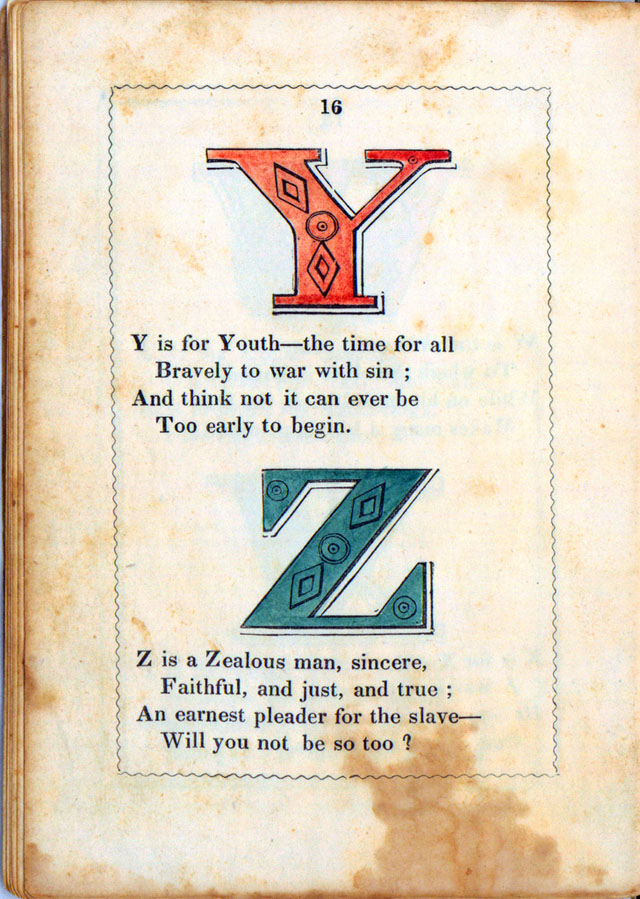
The final page of The Anti-slavery Alphabet (1846)

A widely distributed piece of abolitionist children’s literature is the Anti-Slavery alphabet, published in 1846 by the Philadelphia Female Anti-Slavery Society. The book features coloured prints of the letters of the alphabet accompanied by short verses on the evils of slavery, such as,

B is a Brother with a skin

Of somewhat darker hue,

But in our Heavenly Father's sight,

He is as dear as you.

This classic abolitionist text demonstrates many of the key themes of abolitionist children’s literature including: the violence of slave drivers, the horrors of slave capture, the equality of whites and Blacks and even portrays Africa in a positive light. It is a prime example of anti-slavery ideology promoted through educational material. Pamphlets, picture books and periodicals were the primary forms of abolitionist children’s literature. A less traditional anti-slavery ‘publication’ for children was the production of abolitionist embroidery and handkerchiefs produced by various female anti-slavery societies. Ammidon of the Boston Female Anti-Slavery Society wrote,

We have also published a pocket handkerchief for children... and we fervently pray, that the sad picture of human suffering these too truly portrayed may kindle in the breast of many a free born, happy child, a glow of heartfelt sympathy, and cause the tears to flow and the infant offering to arise to Heaven in behalf of those little injured down-trodden ones.

== Periodical literature ==
Cover of issue 8 of The Slave's Friend (1835)

The first periodical anti-slavery publication for young readers in the United States was The Slave's Friend, with 36 issues published between 1836 and 1838 by the American Anti-Slavery Society. The publication regularly featured woodblock prints that included images of violence perpetrated against slaves by white slave owners, young Black children in chains and Black and white children playing together. The editor of The Slave’s Friend claimed that the publication directly lead to the radicalisation of children and the formation of anti-slavery societies, "About two hundred and fifty thousand copies of The Slave’s Friend have been published, and we suppose they have been read by at least fifty thousand children. Many of them have been deeply interested, stirred up to duty, and have formed antislavery societies." The slave’s friend was a highly radical abolitionist text, it encouraged young readers to boycott products of slavery;

And 'tis because of all this sin, my mother, that

I shun

To taste the tempting sweets, for which such

wickedness is done.

== Authors ==
Much of the American abolitionist children’s literature was written by women and was grounded in the domestic sphere. Harriet Beecher Stowe, Jane Elizabeth Jones, Eliza Lee Cabot Follen, and Maria Goodell Frost are some examples of female abolitionists who wrote children’s literature. Anti-slavery children’s literature was an important means of political participation for white women in nineteenth-century America.

Another literary device employed by authors was the ‘role-model abolitionist child’, a fictional juvenile character who showed sympathy for the enslaved and other virtues, whom the young reader could model themselves upon. These role-model characters would often plead with slavers to free their slaves or halt the violence perpetrated against them. One such example is found in The Edinburg Doll and Other Tales for Children, by Aunt Mary, an abolitionist picture book, written in rhyme format, published in 1854. The Edinburg Doll is the story of Mary, a young white girl on her deathbed, who donates her doll to be auctioned off at a Boston abolitionist exhibition after feeling immense sympathy for the enslaved. The publication was advertised in the abolitionist newspaper The Liberator as "a series of very handsomely executed and profusely illustrated Story Books".

While many slave narratives in abolitionist children’s literature ended unhappily, a common narrative is that of the escaped slave who has found their freedom. The escaped slave character was an important device for abolitionist writers and has been described as 'a kind of cultural-hero who exemplified the American romance of the unconquerable ‘individual mind’ steadily advancing toward freedom and independence.” This character contradicted pro-slavery notions of slaves as highly dependent on their white masters and drew parallels between emancipation and American ideals.

An important piece of abolitionist children’s literature was Pictures and Stories from “Uncle Tom’s Cabin” which was a version of the abolitionist classic Uncle Tom’s Cabin, rewritten specifically for children and published with illustrations in 1853. The book focusses more on the juvenile characters of the story, and has been described as "in some ways more radical than its adult counterpart".

== Representation of the slave ==
Authors of abolitionist children’s literature grappled with notions of race, racial hierarchies, African and slave cultures in different ways. Black enslaved characters were often portrayed as feeble, helpless victims. It is only in the more radical examples of abolitionist literature that slave characters are shown to be brave, cunning and curious, usually in the context of resistance. Abolitionist authors attempted to both portray black characters as morally and intellectually equivalent to whites — and importantly, white readers — and to make readers pity them by characterising them as feeble and in need of rescue from virtuous white emancipators. Portraying the slave as physically broken by slavery affirmed the abolitionist message in a visceral way.

Abolitionist children’s fiction in the United States was almost exclusively written by white authors for white audiences. A sub-genre of abolitionist fiction was the 'white abduction story', wherein the reader was encouraged to ‘put themselves in the shoes’ of an enslaved person of colour. White abduction stories would typically have the reader imagine themselves in the place of a Black slave character or have a white character enslaved. These narratives are designed to elicit sympathy for the enslaved and to deconstruct racial barriers between their white readers and people of colour. The visual device of role reversal in woodblock illustrations accompanying abolitionist texts sometimes portrayed whites in chains and had a similar persuasive aim.

== Slave testimony ==
Slave testimony was often a highly radical form of abolitionist literature, and slave narratives aimed at juvenile readers included compelling first-hand descriptions of violence and repression. Biographical stories of child slaves revealed to young readers the tragic plight of America’s most vulnerable minority, enslaved children. The reality of these narratives further charged the texts with persuasive and emotive force. The Child’s Anti-Slavery Book features the stories of several enslaved children. The book begins with a polemic against slavery directly aimed at juvenile readers, which calls upon the moral authority of the Bible, the Declaration of Independence and the ‘natural right to freedom’ in its denunciation of slavery. Texts such as The Child’s Anti-Slavery Book were politically charged and engaged in the project of 'nation building' in mid nineteenth-century America. While the introductory author claims the stories are biographical, ‘pictures of actual life, and are worthy of your belief’, the narratives are heavily sensationalised and carefully constructed to evoke strong emotional responses from young readers.

Slave testimony often focussed on the separation of children from parents, the unequal freedoms between enslaved children and white plantation children, and the loss of innocence. Biography and testimony was less common than abolitionist fiction, many of the short stories in pamphlets such as The Slave’s Friend are presented as if they are testimony yet lack biographical detail. The Youth’s Emancipator — Published in Ohio by the Executive Committee of the Oberlin Youth’s Anti-Slavery Society from May 1842 to Jan 1843 — had several examples of compelling testimonies including a radical example from its first edition, Escape from Bondage in New York, wherein a young Black boy is groomed and kidnapped by a slaver who he eventually rises up against. Slave testimony was a powerful tool for abolitionists as readers were given an accurate glimpse into the real lives of slaves, the trauma of capture and the brutal conditions of plantation life.

== Pro-slavery responses ==
As abolitionism gained traction in the United States throughout the mid-19th century, so did the reactionary pro-slavery movement. Pro-slavery advocates also realised the importance of furthering their ideology through children’s literature. The primary literary mode of the largely southern advocates for slavery was the plantation story. These stories typically portrayed an ideal plantation as a kind of ordered paradise of racial harmony. Black slaves were often portrayed in pro-slavery children’s literature as ‘dumb, but loyal, grateful to their masters for providing for them, and proud to belong to a man of quality.’

Other forms of pro-slavery children’s literature include the pro-slavery adventure novel and Confederate schoolbooks.

Even more so than abolitionists, pro-slavery writers embedded the ‘virtues’ of slavery into educational material. The Geographical Reader for the Dixie Children, published in 1863 by Marinda Branson Moore, was a confederate textbook which contained educational geographical material for young students. In a section titled ‘Races of Man’, the textbook claims African people are "slothful and vicious, but possess little cunning... they are very cruel to each other, and when they have want they sell their prisoners to the white people for slaves... they know nothing of Jesus, and the climate in Africa is so unhealthy that white men can scarcely go there to preach to them.”

The Rose Bud, August 1832 - August 1833, which was later renamed The Southern Rose Bud August 1833 - 1835, and The Southern Rose September 1835 - August 1939, was a series of widely popular children's magazines, printed in Charleston, South Carolina. The magazine was primarily written by Caroline Howard Gilman, who moved to the South with her husband in 1819 from Boston. The magazines promoted the southern way of life, and heavily supported slavery and its importance in the structure of Southern society.

Gilman also urged readers not to trust Northern writers and reviewers. In an issue of The Southern Rose Bud, she claims that “large, powerful and constantly increasing combinations of mis-named philanthropists” are acting in “dark, subtle and concerted measures to assail and subvert institutions that are the “very lifeblood of this southern section of the confederacy.”, referring to Northern anti-slavery literature. It was not only Northern abolitionist women who found a political outlet in writing children's literature.

== Bibliography ==
1. De Rosa, Deborah C. Domestic Abolitionism and Juvenile Literature, 1830-1865. Albany: State University of New York Press, 2003.
2. Connolly, Paula T. Slavery in American Children’s Literature, 1790-2010. Slavery in American Children’s Literature, 1790-2010. Iowa City: University of Iowa Press, 2013.
3. Rogers, Cynthia M. The Child’s Anti-Slavery Book and other Sunday School Books of the Methodist Episcopal Church, 1827-1880, Methodist History, 49:1, 2010, https://archives.gcah.org/bitstream/handle/10516/1116/Methodist-History-2010-10-Rogers.pdf?sequence=1
4. The Child's Anti-Slavery Book, New York, Carlton & Porter, 1860] https://www.loc.gov/item/11006642/.
5. Townsend, Hannah., and Mary. Townsend. The Anti-Slavery Alphabet. Philadelphia: Printed for the Anti-Slavery Fair, 1847.
6. Ammidon, Melissa. Letter to the Lowell Female Anti-Slavery Society, Boston Female Anti-Slavery Society Papers, Massachusetts Historical Society, July 14, 1835
7. The Slave’s Friend, New York: Published for the American Anti-slavery Society by R.G. Williams, 1836
8. Lindey, Sara. Sympathy and Science: Representing Girls in Abolitionist Children’s Literature. The Journal of the Midwest Modern Language Association 45, no. 1 (2012): 59–73. https://doi.org/10.1353/mml.2012.0002.
9. Noonan, Ellen, and Stephen Railton. Uncle Tom’s Cabin and American Culture: A Multimedia Archive. The Journal of American History 88, no. 3 (2001): 1222–23. https://doi.org/10.2307/2700587.
10. Andrews, William L. To Tell a Free Story : the First Century of Afro-American Autobiography, 1760-1865. Urbana: University of Illinois Press, 1986
11. Broderick, Dorothy M. Image of the Black in Children’s Fiction. New York: Bowker, 1973.
12. Moore, M.B., The Geographical Reader for the Dixie Children, Raleigh, North Carolina, 1863
13. Gilman, Caroline Howard. The Rose Bud, or, Youth’s Gazette. Charleston, S.C: Printed for the editor by James S. Burges, 1832.
14. Saucier, Blanche Connelly. The Rose Bud. The Elementary English Review 18, no. 8 1941: 293–309.
