= Thomas Manders =

English comedian and actor-manager

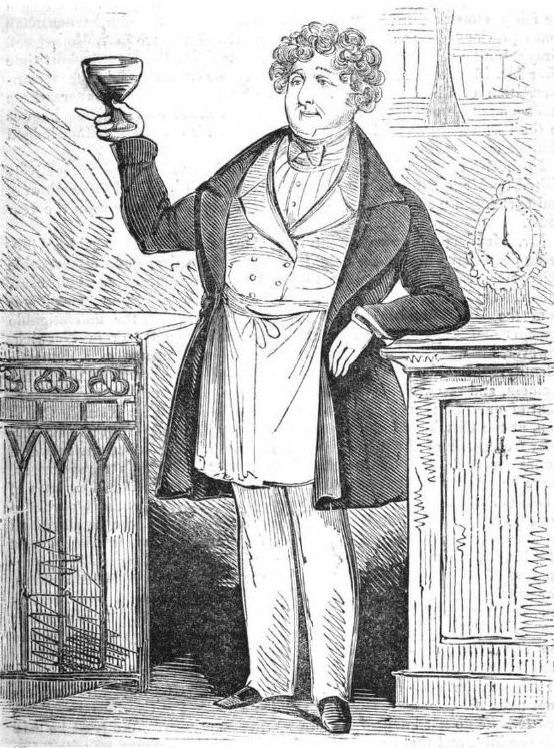
Tom Manders in about 1838

Thomas Manders (22 December 1797–28 October 1859) was an actor-manager and low comedian of the early 19th century.

== Early life and career ==
Tom Manders was born in High Holborn in London in 1797. He was originally intended for a commercial life, and for that purpose joined the Bank of England in 1814 but was pensioned off in 1821 when his office was abolished by the withdrawal of one-pound notes. He married Louisa Powell (1801-1880) in 1820. A keen theatre-goer, he attended performances most evenings after work and having tried his hand as an amateur actor on numerous occasions decided to turn professional in 1822. On the recommendation of Charles Kemble he was taken on by John Saville Faucit but did not feel that his talents were being recognised under Faucit's management so instead Manders went out into the provinces.

== Return to London ==
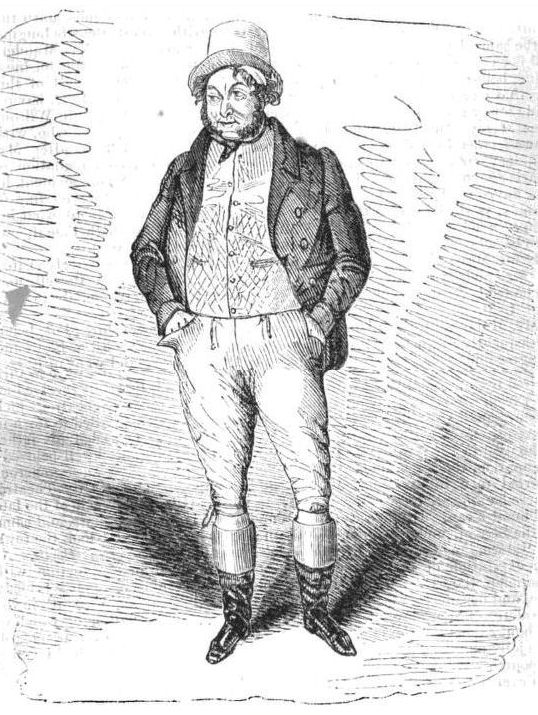
As Sam Slap in The Rake's Progress (1833)

He began a provincial career with his wife before unsuccessfully going into theatre management in Devon for a period. He appeared in Exeter, Guernsey, Weymouth and Margate as an actor. He was invited to appear at the Theatre Royal in Norwich by its manager George Smith. The sudden death of his father in 1829 forced Manders to return to London where he returned to the stage, this time rather more successfully, under the management of John Kemble Chapman at the City Theatre in Milton Street, where he appeared as Justice Greedy in A New Way to Pay Old Debts opposite Edmund Kean as Sir Giles Over-reach.

After working in various minor theatres Manders went to the Strand Theatre under the management of Harriet Waylett for whom he played Cupid in the burletta Loves of the Devils. He also played at the Olympic Theatre and was at the Queen's Theatre for some sixteen years where he was a great favourite. He was the original Tom Stag, a noisy, good-humoured bailiff, in the farce Captain Stevens (1832).

== Later life ==
Manders went into management with John Kemble Chapman at the City Theatre where he became a great success playing the low comedy roles. At the Queen's Theatre he played Sam Slap in The Rake's Progress (1833) and Sarah Gamp in Martin Chuzzlewit (1844) in a production authorised by Charles Dickens. He became the landlord of the Sun Tavern in Long Acre, a popular theatrical rendezvous, and the Marquis of Gransby in Knightsbridge. A "richly humorous actor of comic parts", he was considered by the author of Actors by Gaslight to be a worthy successor to the great comedian John Reeve, but and Manders disappeared into obscurity. His wife, Louisa Manders, suffered several accidents during her long career as an actress, including a fall from the flies at Sadler's Wells Theatre in 1834. Later she was famous for playing older women.

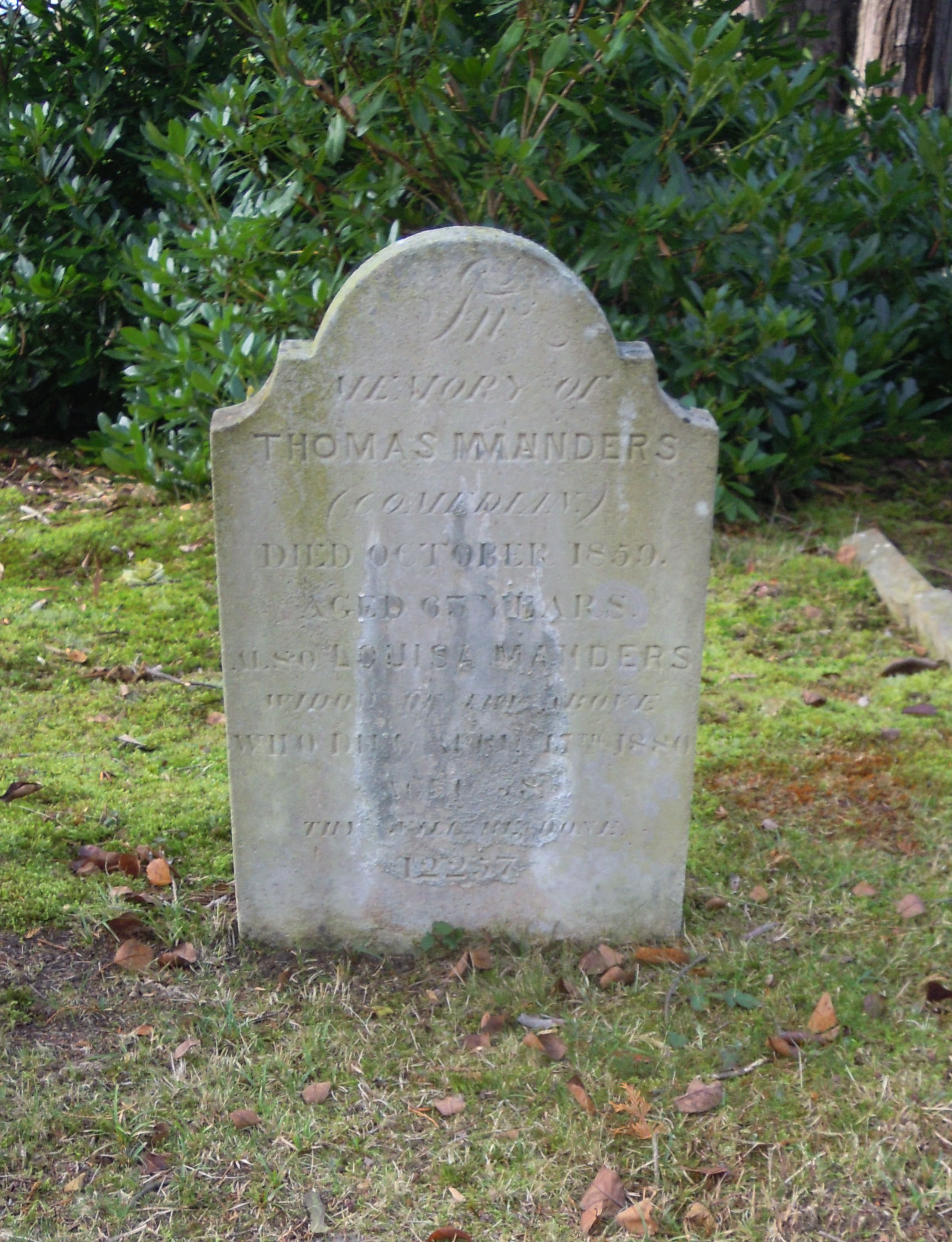
The grave of Thomas Manders in Brookwood Cemetery

Thomas Manders is buried with his wife in the Actors' Acre in Brookwood Cemetery.
