= Barry Jones (actor) =

British actor (1893–1981)

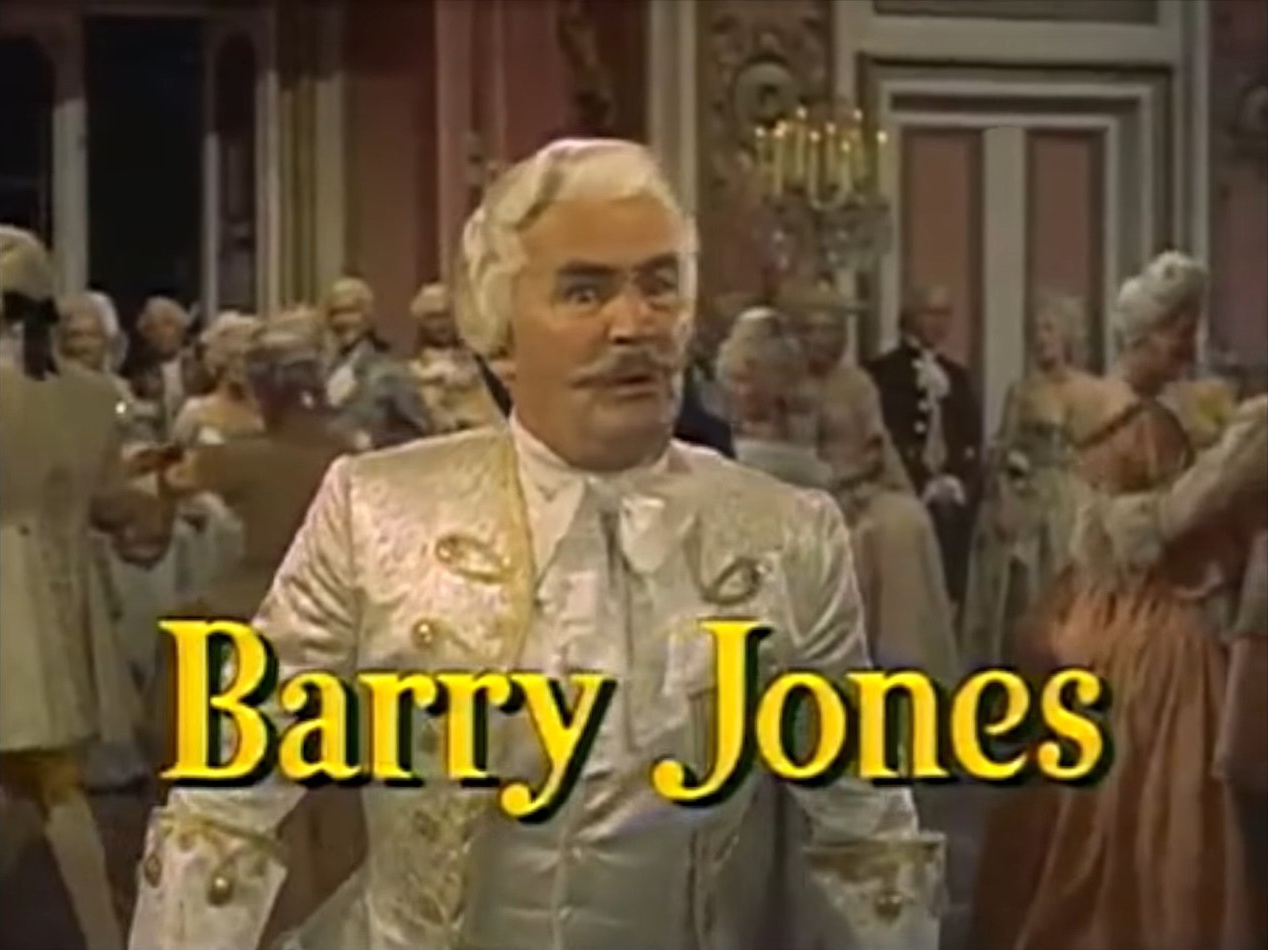
- Jones in The Glass Slipper (1955)
- Born: Barry Cuthbert Jones; 6 March 1893; St. Peter Port, Guernsey, Channel Islands
- Died: 1 May 1981 (aged 88); Guernsey, Channel Islands
- Occupation: Actor
- Years active: 1921–1965

Barry Cuthbert Jones (6 March 1893 – 1 May 1981) was a Guernsey-born actor best known for his appearances in the plays of Bernard Shaw in Britain, Canada and the US.

== Biography ==
Jones was born on Guernsey in the Channel Islands on 6 March 1893, the son of William John Jones and his wife Amelia. He was educated at Elizabeth College, Guernsey. On the outbreak of the First World War in 1914 he joined the British Army, and served with the Royal Guernsey Light Infantry and Royal Irish Fusiliers until February 1921.

He made his first appearance on the stage at the Grand Theatre, Leeds, with Sir Frank Benson's company in March 1921 as the Clerk of the Court in The Merchant of Venice. After two years touring with the Benson company he went to North America. He played stock engagements in Toronto and Boston. and made his first appearance in New York at the Garrick Theatre (for the Theatre Guild) in April 1924 in Man and the Masses. After playing in those cities and Chicago over the next four years, he entered into partnership with Maurice Colbourne in 1928 and for the next three years they toured Canada and the United States with a repertory mostly consisting of plays by Bernard Shaw – You Never Can Tell, John Bull's Other Island, The Philanderer, The Doctor's Dilemma, Fanny's First Play, Arms and the Man, Candida, Man and Superman, and The Apple Cart – as well as A. A. Milne's The Dover Road and Oscar Wilde's The Importance of Being Earnest.

In 1931 Jones made his London début after taking over the management of the Ambassadors Theatre together with Colbourne. Jones played King Eric VIII in The Queen's Husband in which he made a success in the West End and on tour in Canada, where he also appeared in 1932 in Too True to be Good and The Apple Cart. In 1933, returning to London, Jones appeared at the Phoenix Theatre as Jacques in As You Like It with Colbourne as Orlando, Fabia Drake as Rosalind and Joyce Carey as Celia.

After touring the US in 1934 he returned to the West End to play Charles Lankaster in Moonlight is Silver and in 1935 he joined Ivor Novello's company as King Stefan in the musical Glamorous Night. In 1936 he succeeded Ralph Richardson as Emile Delbar in Promise by Henri Bernstein. Later in the year, at the Lyric, he played the title role in Charles the King, written by Colbourne.

After five more West End productions he once again toured Canada, this time under the auspices of the British Council, playing Charles in Charles the King, the Judge in Shaw's Geneva, and Tobias in James Bridie's Tobias and the Angel. He then played in New York before touring the US with Gertrude Lawrence in Private Lives in 1941 and playing Dr Blenkinsopp in The Doctor's Dilemma on Broadway and on tour later in that year.

Returning to Britain in 1942, Jones became a special constable in London, and after playing Frederick in Somerset Maugham's Home and Beauty in the West End and on tour he joined the RNVR. He served until October 1945 and after demobilisation he toured for ENSA in The Apple Cart in Austria, Italy and Germany. At Covent Garden in July 1948 he appeared as Hopeful in an adaptation of The Pilgrim's Progress. At the Phoenix in March 1949 he succeeded Eric Portman as Andrew Crocker-Harris in The Browning Version and Arthur Gosport in Harlequinade, both by Terence Rattigan.

Jones's roles in the 1950s included Howard Jones in Mrs Inspector Jones (Savoy 1950), Socrates in Barefoot in Athens (Martin Beck Theatre, 1951) and, also in New York, John Tarleton in Shaw's Misalliance (1953) and the King in William Saroyan's The Cave Dwellers (1957). At the Haymarket in 1959–1960 he played Mackenzie Savage in the long-running comedy The Pleasure of His Company.

Jones also appeared in many films between the early 1930s and the mid-1960s. Several of these were Hollywood films, including Twelve O'Clock High (1949), as Lord Haw-Haw (voice only), and Plymouth Adventure (1952) as William Brewster. Jones normally played supporting roles in films, but he had a rare leading role in Seven Days to Noon (1950), as the villain, Professor Willingdon.

Jones and Colbourne shared a house in Campden Hill, London, and subsequently on Jones's native Guernsey, where Colbourne died on 22 September 1965, aged 71. Jones outlived him by sixteen years, dying at the Guernsey house on 1 May 1981 at the age of 88

== Selected filmography ==
- Women Who Play (1932) as Ernest Steele
- Number Seventeen (1932) as Henry Doyle
- Arms and the Man (1932) as Captain Bluntschli
- The Gay Adventure (1936) as Darnton
- Murder in the Family (1938) as Stephen Osborne
- Squadron Leader X (1943) as Bruce Fenwick
- Frieda (1947) as Holliday
- Dancing with Crime (1947) as Gregory
- The Calendar (1948) as Sir John Garth
- Uneasy Terms (1948) as Inspector Gringall
- That Dangerous Age (1949) as Arnold Cane
- The Bad Lord Byron (1949) as Colonel Stonhope
- Twelve O'Clock High (1949) as Lord Haw-Haw (voice, uncredited)
- Madeleine (1950) as Lord Advocate
- Seven Days to Noon (1950) as Professor Willingdon
- The Mudlark (1950) as Speaker (uncredited)
- The Clouded Yellow (1951) as Nicholas Fenton
- White Corridors (1951) as Dr. Shoesmith
- Appointment with Venus (1951) as Provost
- The Magic Box (1951) as The Bath Doctor
- Plymouth Adventure (1952) as William Brewster
- Hamlet (1953) as Polonius
- Return to Paradise (1953) as Pastor Corbett
- Prince Valiant (1954) as King Luke
- Demetrius and the Gladiators (1954) as Claudius
- Brigadoon (1954) as Mr. Lundie
- The Glass Slipper (1955) as Duke
- Alexander the Great (1956) as Aristotle
- War and Peace (1956) as Prince Mikhail Andreevich Rostov
- Saint Joan (1957) as De Courcelles
- The Safecracker (1958) as Bennett Carfield
- The 39 Steps (1959) as Professor Logan
- Karolina Rijecka (1961) as Admiral
- A Study in Terror (1965) as Duke of Shires
- The Heroes of Telemark (1965) as Professor Logan (final film role)

== Appearances in TV series ==
- Hallmark Hall of Fame (1953–1961)
- Robert Montgomery Presents (1955–1956) as Captain Whalley
- The Saint (1963) as Otis Q. Fennick
- Randall and Hopkirk (Deceased) as Patrick Holt
- The Outer Limits (1963) as Dwight Hartley
- Martin Chuzzlewit (1964) as Martin Chuzzlewit the Elder
- The Spread of the Eagle (1963) as Julius Caesar
- Sherlock Holmes (1965) as Charles Augustus Milverton

Source: Halliwell's Who's Who in the Movies published by Harper-Collins – ISBN 0-06-093507-3

== Sources ==
- Gaye, Freda, ed. (1961). Who's Who in the Theatre (thirteenth ed.). London: Sir Isaac Pitman and Sons. OCLC 3039406.
