= Great Expectations (1934 film) =

1934 film by Stuart Walker

- poster
- Directed by: Stuart Walker
- Written by: Gladys Unger
- Based on: Great Expectations; 1861 novel by Charles Dickens
- Produced by: Stanley Bergerman; Carl Laemmle, Jr.
- Starring: Phillips Holmes; Jane Wyatt; Florence Reed; Francis L. Sullivan
- Cinematography: George Robinson
- Music by: Edward Ward
- Production company: Universal Pictures
- Distributed by: Universal Pictures
- Release date: October 22, 1934
- Running time: 100 minutes
- Country: United States
- Language: English

Great Expectations is a 1934 romantic drama film directed by Stuart Walker. Filmed with mostly American actors, it was the first sound version of the novel and was produced in Hollywood by Universal Studios. It stars Phillips Holmes as Pip, Jane Wyatt as Estella and Florence Reed as Miss Havisham. The film is an adaptation of the 1861 Charles Dickens novel of the same name.

This film differs somewhat from the novel in making Miss Havisham more eccentric than insane. Unlike the novel, she does not wear her bridal veil constantly, does not seem to have really engineered all of Pip's misfortunes with Estella, and dies offscreen of natural causes rather than in a fire.

== Plot ==
9 year old 'Pip' Pirrip, an orphan living with relatives, aids and befriends an escaped convict on the moors, an act that will have a profound effect on his life.

== Cast ==
- Henry Hull as Abel Magwitch
- Phillips Holmes as Pip
- Jane Wyatt as Estella
- Florence Reed as Miss Havisham
- Alan Hale as Joe Gargery
- Rafaela Ottiano as Mrs. Joe Gargery
- George Barraud as Compeyson
- Francis L. Sullivan as Mr. Jaggers
- Douglas Wood as Wopsle
- Forrester Harvey as Uncle Pumblechook
- George P. Breakston as Pip, as a Child
- Harry Cording as Orlick
- Eily Malyon as Sarah Pocket (billed as Eily Malyan)
- Anne Howard as Estella, as a Child
- Walter Armitage as Herbert Pocket
- Walter Brennan as Prisoner on Ship (uncredited)

== Critical response ==
Critics consider this 1934 version far inferior to the classic 1946 version, made in England and directed by David Lean. A notable link between the two movies is that Francis L. Sullivan played the role of Jaggers in both.

Helen Brown Norden of Vanity Fair wrote: "An exciting version of the Dickens novel, pungent with the original flavour and spirit, well-acted by Henry Hull, George Breakston and Florence Reed, and beautifully directed by Stuart Walker. Grand entertainment."

Film critic Ella H. McCormick of the Detroit Free Press wrote: "Those Dickens lovers who go to see this one of his famed novels picturized will not have their great expectations cold-showered, despite the fact the muddy, foggy Thames waters play an important part of the story."
