= Pip =

Pip, PiP, PIP, Pips, PIPS, and similar, may refer to:

== Common meanings ==
- Pip, colloquial name for the star(s) worn on military uniform as part of rank badge, as in the British Army officer rank insignia or with many Commonwealth police agencies
- The seed of some fruits
- The pyrena, also called a pit or stone, inside some fruits
- Pip (counting), a small but easily countable item, such as the dots on dice or symbols on playing cards
- Pip, a dot on a domino tile, refer Glossary of domino terms

== Arts, entertainment and media ==
- "Pip" (South Park), a 2000 episode of South Park
- The Pips, the backing singers in the musical group Gladys Knight & the Pips
- Providence Initiative for Psychogeographic Studies, an art group
- PiP Animation Services, a Canadian animation studio
- The Pip, the nickname of a clandestine radio station of Russian origin
- BBC Pips or The Pips, a timing signal broadcast by the BBC
- Picture-in-picture, a broadcasting format
- Pips, a logic puzzle in The New York Times Games

== Finance and management ==
- Percentage in point, a currency exchange rate fluctuation
- Performance improvement plan, a management technique
- Personal Independence Payment, a welfare benefit in the UK
- Personal injury protection, a type of car insurance
- Policy-ineffectiveness proposition, an economic theory

== People ==
- Pip, diminutive of Philip or Philippa
- Pip (nickname), a list of people with the nickname
- Pip (musician) (born 1992), contestant on Season 2 of NBC's TV show The Voice
- Pip Devonshire (born 1966), New Zealand weaver
- Pip Millett, English musician Georgia Willacy
- Pip Simmonds, New Zealand freestyle skier
- Scroobius Pip (born 1981), alias of rapper David Meads
- Josef Priller (1915–1961), German fighter ace nicknamed "Pips"

== Fictional characters ==
- Pip (Great Expectations), Philip Pirrip from the Charles Dickens' novel Great Expectations
- Pip Pirrup, a student at South Park Elementary in South Park
- Pip (Moby-Dick character)
- Peregrin Took, (Pippin) in J. R. R. Tolkien's fantasy The Lord of the Rings
- Pip, a major character in The Railway Series of books
- Pip, in the British newspaper strip cartoon Pip, Squeak and Wilfred
- Pip (Chrono Cross)
- Pip the Troll, a Marvel Comics character
- Pip, in the Grailquest gamebook series
- Pip Bernadotte, in the manga Hellsing
- Pip, an Animaniacs character
- Pip, in the Nickelodeon animated show Back at the Barnyard
- Chiana, in the Australian television series Farscape, nicknamed "Pip"
- Pip, in the film The Halloween Tree
- Pip, a persona featured on the Tori Amos album American Doll Posse
- Pips, a fictional fairy in the animated film FernGully: The Last Rainforest and its sequel
- Pip, an animated chipmunk in the Disney live-action/animated film Enchanted
- Pip, an otter in the television series Bear in the Big Blue House
- Pip the Penguin, in the animated series T.O.T.S.
- Pip, from The Twilight Zone (1959) episode "A Nice Place to Visit"
- Pip Fitz-Amobi, the main character of A Good Girls Guide to Murder

== Schools ==
- Pakistan International Public School and College (PIPS), a private residential school in Abbottabad, Pakistan
- Pakistan Institute of Physics, a physics research institute of the University of Engineering and Technology, Lahore in Pakistan

== Politics and government ==
- Pakistan Institute for Parliamentary Services, a Pakistani government institution
- Pakistan Institute for Peace Studies, a Pakistani non-governmental organization
- Police information point, a kiosk run by British police
- Peruvian Investigative Police, a plainclothes police unit
- Puerto Rican Independence Party, a political party
- Personal Independence Payment, a British welfare benefit

== Science and technology ==
=== Biology and medicine ===
- Peak inspiratory pressure (P_{IP}), in mechanical ventilation
- Plasma membrane intrinsic protein, a class of plant aquaporins
- Poly Implant Prothèse, a former French breast implants manufacturer
- Polymerization induced phase separation
- Prolactin-induced protein, a protein in humans
- Proximal interphalangeal joints, interphalangeal joints of the hand
- Pairwise-invasibility plot in evolutionary invasion analysis
- Psychosis-intermittent hyponatremia-polydipsia (PIP) syndrome
- Pug impression pad, an object used for the census of tigers

=== Computing ===
- Peripheral Interchange Program, a DEC and CP/M file transfer utility
- Point in polygon, a concept in computational geometry
- Policy Information Point, in eXtensible Access Control Markup Language
- Private Internet Protocol
- Pip (package manager), a Python package installer
- P.I.P.S. Is POSIX on Symbian, known as P.I.P.S.
- Precision Time Protocol Industry Profile, an IEC 62439-3 standard

=== Other uses in science and technology ===
- Greenwich Time Signal, popularly known as the pips
- Predicted impact point, the location at which a projectile is expected to strike
- Profile ignition pickup, a term in automotive technology
- Proper indecomposable past set, a causal relation in a Lorentzian manifold
- Picture-in-picture, a video stream playing within an inset window of a TV or device screen

== Other uses ==
- Battle of the Pips, an incident in World War II
- Palisades Interstate Parkway, a highway in New York and New Jersey, US
- Pip Cliffs, Graham Land, Antarctica
- Pilot Point Airport, Pilot Point, Alaska, US (IATA code PIP)

== See also ==
- Phosphatidylinositol 3-phosphate, also known as PI(3)P
- Phosphatidylinositol 4-phosphate, also known as PI(4)P
- Phosphatidylinositol 5-phosphate, also known as PI(5)P
- The Pip-Boy, a wrist computer in the Fallout video games
- Pipp (disambiguation), including pipps
