= Great Expectations (1946 film) =

1946 film by David Lean

- Theatrical release poster
- Directed by: David Lean
- Written by: David Lean; Anthony Havelock-Allan; Ronald Neame
- Based on: Great Expectations; 1861 novel by Charles Dickens
- Produced by: Anthony Havelock-Allan; Ronald Neame
- Starring: John Mills; Valerie Hobson; Bernard Miles; Francis L. Sullivan; Anthony Wager; Jean Simmons
- Narrated by: John Mills
- Cinematography: Guy Green, (Robert Krasker shot opening sequence)
- Edited by: Jack Harris
- Music by: Walter Goehr
- Production company: Cineguild
- Distributed by: General Film Distributors Ltd.
- Release date: 16 December 1946
- Running time: 118 minutes
- Country: United Kingdom
- Language: English
- Budget: £391,600
- Box office: £412,800 (£222,600 UK and £190,200 overseas)

Great Expectations is a 1946 British drama film directed by David Lean, inspired by the 1861 novel by Charles Dickens and starring John Mills and Valerie Hobson. The supporting cast included Bernard Miles, Francis L. Sullivan, Anthony Wager, Jean Simmons, Finlay Currie, Martita Hunt and Alec Guinness.

The script is based on a slimmed-down version of Dickens' novel. It was written by David Lean, Anthony Havelock-Allan, Cecil McGivern, Ronald Neame and Kay Walsh, after Lean had seen an abridged 1939 stage version of the novel, written by Alec Guinness. In the stage version, Guinness had played Herbert Pocket while Martita Hunt played Miss Havisham, roles that they reprised for the film. However, the film was not a strict adaptation of the play. The film was produced by Ronald Neame and photographed by Guy Green. It was the first of two films Lean directed based on Dickens' novels, the other being his 1948 adaptation of Oliver Twist.

John Bryan and Wilfred Shingleton won the Academy Award for Best Art Direction, Black-and-White, while Guy Green won for Best Cinematography, Black-and-White. The film was also nominated for Best Director, as well as Best Screenplay Adaptation, and Best Picture. The film is now regarded as one of Lean's best; in 1999, on the British Film Institute's Top 100 British films list, Great Expectations was named the 5th greatest British film of all time.

== Plot ==
Orphan Phillip "Pip" Pirrip lives with his shrewish older sister and her kindhearted blacksmith husband, Joe Gargery. While visiting his parents' graves alone, Pip encounters an escaped convict, Abel Magwitch, who intimidates the boy into returning the next day with blacksmith's tools to remove his chains. Pip also brings some food. Famished, Magwitch devours the food and thanks him. Magwitch is caught when he attacks a hated fellow escapee rather than fleeing.

Miss Havisham, a rich, eccentric spinster, arranges to have Pip come to her mansion regularly to provide her with company and to play with her adopted daughter, beautiful but cruel teenager Estella. Estella mocks Pip's coarse manners at every opportunity, but young Pip had quickly fallen in love with her at first sight. He also meets a boy, Herbert Pocket, whom he beats in an impromptu boxing match. The visits come to an end when Pip turns 14 and begins his apprenticeship as a blacksmith. Estella also leaves for France to learn the ways of a lady.

Six years later, Miss Havisham's lawyer Mr Jaggers visits Pip to tell him a mysterious benefactor has offered to transform him into a gentleman with "great expectations"; Pip assumes it is Miss Havisham. He is taken to London and stays with Herbert Pocket, who teaches him how to behave like a gentleman. Herbert tells Pip that Miss Havisham was left at the altar many years ago and that she is determined to avenge herself against men, with Estella as her instrument to break men's hearts.

When Pip turns 21, Joe brings a request from Miss Havisham to visit her. There Pip is reunited with Estella, who tells him that she has no heart, and confesses that, despite flirting with the wealthy but unpopular Bentley Drummle, she has absolutely no feelings for him.

Back in London, Pip receives an unexpected visitor: Magwitch, who made a fortune sheep-farming in New South Wales, Australia. Magwitch reveals that he is Pip's benefactor and that he was so touched by Pip's kindness that he resolved to prosper so that Pip could live a gentleman's life. He tells the "dear boy" that he considers him his son.

Growing suspicious of Drummle's overtures towards Estella, Pip visits her. She tells him she is going to marry Drummle. Pip confronts Miss Havisham for using Estella to manipulate him. Miss Havisham begs his forgiveness. Pip leaves, but when she stands to follow him, a piece of flaming wood from the fireplace rolls out and ignites her dress. Her screams alert Pip, who runs back to save her but fails.

After being warned that an old enemy has learned that Magwitch is in London, Pip and Herbert plot to smuggle him onto a packet ship leaving England, on which Pip is to accompany him. They row out to the ship but are intercepted by waiting police, tipped off by Magwitch's old enemy. Magwitch is injured in a struggle, but his nemesis is pushed down to his death by the ship's paddlewheels. Magwitch is captured and sentenced to death.

Magwitch tells Pip of his lost daughter, and Pip's suspicion that she is Estella is confirmed by Jaggers. Pip visits a dying Magwitch in prison, tells him of her fate and that he, Pip, is in love with her. Magwitch dies a contented man.

Stricken by illness and with his expectations gone, Pip is taken home and nursed back to health by Joe. He revisits Miss Havisham's deserted house, where he finds Estella and learns that Drummle had broken off their engagement when Jaggers informed him of her parentage. Learning that Estella plans to live in seclusion in the house, which she has inherited, Pip tears down the curtains, opens the boarded-up windows and tells Estella that he has never stopped loving her. After hesitating, she embraces him and they leave the house together.

== Cast ==
- John Mills as Pip
  - Anthony Wager as Young Pip
- Valerie Hobson as Estella
  - Jean Simmons as Young Estella
- Bernard Miles as Joe Gargery
- Francis L. Sullivan as Mr. Jaggers
- Martita Hunt as Miss Havisham
- Finlay Currie as Abel Magwitch
- Alec Guinness as Herbert Pocket
  - John Forrest as The Pale Young Gentleman, Herbert Pocket
- Ivor Barnard as Mr. Wemmick
- Freda Jackson as Mrs. Joe Gargery
- Eileen Erskine as Biddy
- George Hayes as Convict
- Hay Petrie as Uncle Pumblechook
- Torin Thatcher as Bentley Drummle
- O. B. Clarence as the Aged Parent
- John Burch as Mr. Wopsle
- Richard George as the Sergeant
- Grace Denbeigh-Russell as Mrs. Wopsle
- Everley Gregg as Sarah Pocket
- Anne Holland as Relation
- Frank Atkinson as Mike
- Gordon Begg as Night Porter
- Edie Martin as Mrs. Whimple
- Walford Hyden as the Dancing Master
- Roy Arthur as Galley Steersman

== Locations ==
Restoration House in Rochester was Dickens' inspiration for "Satis House", the decaying mansion of Miss Havisham. The production reproduced Restoration House in Denham Film Studios in Buckinghamshire.

Dickens based Joe Gargery's house on the forge in the village of Chalk, near Gravesend, Kent – a replica was erected on St Mary's Marshes on the Isle of Grain on the Thames Estuary. Pip and Herbert Pocket arrange to meet Magwitch and help him escape at Chatham Docks where slip 8 was used for the scene as well as exterior shots of the prison hulk ships. The River Medway and the adjacent St Mary's Marshes appear in scenes where Pip and his friend, Herbert Pocket, row their boat to a small inn whilst waiting for the paddle steamer to arrive. The ship used in the film was called Empress, dating from the latter half of the nineteenth century and owned by Cosens & Co Ltd of Weymouth. She was brought down to the River Medway for the shoot. "New masts were stepped-in with square rigging and dummy sails, the funnel was lengthened and the paddle-boxes enlarged until it looked exactly right."

The company was based at Rochester, and stayed for six weeks at the Royal Victoria and Bull Hotel – the Blue Boar in Dickens' novel. The unit for the location work for the film was based on a derelict naval fort on Darnett Ness Island in the River Medway.

== Development of the script ==
The script is a slimmed-down version of Dickens' novel. It was inspired after David Lean witnessed an abridged 1939 stage version of the novel, by Alec Guinness. Guinness had played Herbert Pocket, and Martita Hunt was Miss Havisham in the stage version of 1939. The script for the film was written by David Lean, Anthony Havelock-Allan, Cecil McGivern, Ronald Neame and Kay Walsh.

David Lean approached Clemence Dane to write the script, but considered what she wrote "so awful [-] It was hideously embarrassing" – that he decided he and Ronald Neame should write their own versions. In January 1945 they went to the Ferry Boat Inn at Fowey in Cornwall and wrote a continuity. When Lean worked on Brief Encounter, Neame worked on the script with Havelock-Allan, and later with Cecil McGivern. Kay Walsh was another writer given a screen credit and wrote the ending.

== Production notes ==
Alec Guinness admired the way Lean directed him, singling out a close-up in which he had to laugh out loud, and which he struggled to make look un-manufactured. Lean told him to forget about the whole thing, sat by his side, and made a little signal to the camera to start turning in the course of the conversation. He said something which made Guinness laugh and then said, "Cut". Guinness: "So he got this shot on a totally false premise... but thank God. I don't think I would have ever achieved it otherwise". Valerie Hobson however called the experience of working with Lean on the film "the unhappiest" and called him "a cold director – he gave me nothing at all as an actress".

At the end of the film, a shot of Valerie Hobson staring into a mirror was taking longer than anticipated and was suspended – it was lunchtime – and returned to in the afternoon. Later, some three months after the film had been on exhibition, a cinema-goer asked what was meant by a Chad being reflected in the mirror. It seems that a worker on the film had drawn it on the wall during the break in filming, and it is dimly visible in the final scene behind John Mills' shoulder as he says "I've never ceased to love you when there seemed no hope in my love".

The musical score is credited to Walter Goehr, known primarily as a conductor, but significant portions were actually written by Kenneth Pakeman.

== Reception ==
=== Critical ===
The film won critical praise on first release, with many commentators hailing it as the finest film yet made from a Dickens novel. Dilys Powell, writing for The Sunday Times, was "grateful for cinema which includes so much of Dickens, which constructs its narrative from the original material with scarcely an intrusion" and Richard Winnington, in the News Chronicle, wrote that "Dickens has never before been rendered effectively into cinema terms". Gavin Lambert however, writing for the short-lived, but influential Sequence magazine, felt "that it is not so much an attempt to recreate Dickens on the screen, as a very graceful evasion of most of the issues". In America James Agee praised the film – "almost never less than graceful, tasteful and intelligent". Agee continued: "I ... wish that the Dickens illustrations had been studied still more faithfully and imaginatively—that the whole tone of the film had had a kind of india-ink darkness, psychologically as well as visually: for it seems to me they had hold of a story much more cruel and mysterious than the one that got told ... I doubt that such a film would have been so popular as this one, and I am sure it could not have been so charming." Critic Pauline Kael wrote, "The film is emotional, exciting, full of action; sequences are planned in terms of heightened dramatic contrasts and sudden, scary tensions." British critic Leslie Halliwell gave it four of four stars: " ... this is a superbly pictorial rendering of a much-loved novel, with all the famous characters in safe hands and masterly judgement in every department." Leonard Maltin gave the film four of four stars: "One of the greatest films ever made, a vivid adaptation of Dickens' tale ... Opening graveyard sequence is a gem."

A 1999 review in the US by Roger Ebert noted the film as "the greatest of all the Dickens films" and added that "The movie was made by Lean at the top of his early form". The director, David Lean, himself had a particular fondness for the film. Later in life when a fan would mention how much they loved Lawrence of Arabia, Lean would reply with a "thank you." If a fan expressed that Great Expectations was their favorite Lean film, the director would often respond, "Quite right."

The February 2020 issue of New York Magazine named Great Expectations as among "The Best Movies That Lost Best Picture at the Oscars" when the film was released in the United States in 1947.

=== Box office ===
It was also the third most popular film at the British box office in 1947 and most popular movie at the Canadian box office in 1948. According to Kinematograph Weekly the 'biggest winner' at the box office in 1947 Britain was The Courtneys of Curzon Street, with "runners up" being The Jolson Story, Great Expectations, Odd Man Out, Frieda, Holiday Camp and Duel in the Sun.

It earned $2 million in rentals in North America.

According to Rank's own figures the film had made a profit of £21,200 for the company by December 1949.

The film's critical status has generally stayed high. Kevin Brownlow, a biographer of Lean, wrote that "Dickens' brilliance at creating characters was matched by Cineguild's choice of actors", and Alain Silver and James Ursini have drawn attention to the film's "overall narrative subjectivity", finding Lean "more than faithful to the original's first person style".

In 1999, it came fifth in a BFI poll of the top 100 British films, while in 2004, Total Film named it the fourteenth greatest British film of all time. It was the first British film to win an Oscar for its cinematography.

=== Awards ===
John Bryan (Art Direction) and Wilfred Shingleton (Set Direction) won the Academy Award for Best Art Direction, Black-and-White, while Guy Green won for Best Cinematography, Black-and-White in 1948. Lean was nominated for Best Director, Lean, Ronald Neame and Anthony Havelock-Allan for Best Screenplay and the film for Best Picture.

== See also ==
- BFI Top 100 British films
