= Mr. Jaggers =

Character from Great Expectations

- Great Expectations character
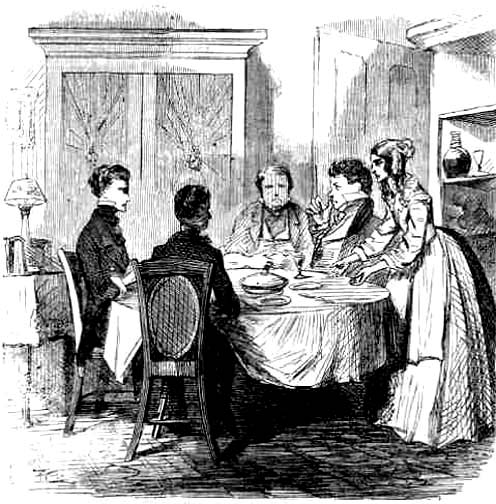
- Created by: Charles Dickens

In-universe information
- Occupation: Lawyer
- Origin: London

Mr. Jaggers is a fictional character from Charles Dickens' 1861 novel Great Expectations. In the novel, he is portrayed as a lawyer whose clients include many of the book's main characters, such as Miss Havisham and Pip.

== Profession ==
Mr. Jaggers is a lawyer. In the book, he is described as having a "dismal" office, and "knowing something to everyone else's disadvantage". In his office, two busts are kept, which his clerk John Wemmick later explains to be the death masks of his criminal clients. Jaggers is often characterized as ruthless and heavy-handed, offering a rebuttal to almost every word in court but also using force against his own clients. In his office, he is often seen washing his hands with scented soap, seemingly as if to wash away his disgust in defending clients he knows are guilty. Because of his occupation, Jaggers has a serious personality, and is never seen laughing or joking. Critical opinion on his character varies, with commentaries on the work describing him as both self-centered and as a good man turned bad by his profession.

== Personal life ==
In contrast with Mr. Wemmick, who takes great efforts to separate his work from his personal life, Mr. Jaggers keeps many legal papers and books in his house, indicating that he works on law in his free time. Priding himself on his respected and feared status, he is said by Mr. Wemmick to leave his doors and windows unlocked, knowing that no Londoner would steal from him. Mr. Jaggers has a housekeeper, Molly, who he rescued from execution in court.

== Connection with Pip ==
In Great Expectations, Mr. Jaggers presents himself to Pip's brother-in-law, Joe Gargery, telling him and Pip of an offer made by an unnamed donor to support Pip's education in London. Pip accepts the offer, and from then on Jaggers becomes his guardian, releasing him from his apprenticeship to Joe.

== See also ==
- John Wemmick
