= Francis L. Sullivan =

English actor (1903–1956)

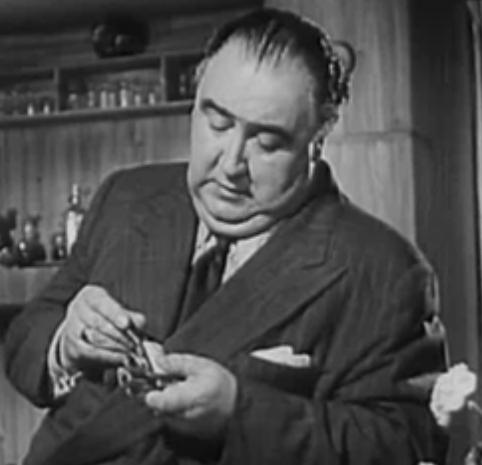
- Sullivan in Behave Yourself! (1951)
- Born: Francis Loftus Sullivan; 6 January 1903; Wandsworth, London, England
- Died: 19 November 1956 (aged 53); New York City, U.S.
- Occupation: Actor
- Years active: 1932–1955
- Spouse: Frances Joan Perkins (1935–his death)
- Awards: Best Featured Actor in a Play; 1955 Witness for the Prosecution

Francis Loftus Sullivan (6 January 1903 – 19 November 1956) was an English film and stage actor.

== Early life ==
Francis Loftus Sullivan was born in London on 6 January 1903. His parents were Mr. and Mrs. Michael Sullivan, and he had two brothers and a sister. He attended Stonyhurst, a Jesuit public school, and had additional schooling in Neuchatel, Switzerland. He initially planned to be an engineer.

== Career ==
A heavily built man with a striking double-chin and a deep voice, Sullivan made his acting debut at the Old Vic at age 18 in Shakespeare's Richard III. He had considerable theatrical experience before he appeared in his first film in 1932, The Missing Rembrandt, as a German villain opposite Arthur Wontner as Sherlock Holmes.

Among his film roles are Mr Bumble in Oliver Twist (1948) and Phil Nosseross in the film noir Night and the City (1950). Sullivan also played the part of the lawyer Jaggers in two versions of Charles Dickens's Great Expectations - in 1934 and 1946. He appeared in a fourth Dickens film, the 1935 Universal Pictures version of The Mystery of Edwin Drood, in which he played Crisparkle.

He was featured in The Citadel (1938), starring Robert Donat, and a decade later he played the role of Pierre Cauchon in the technicolor version of Joan of Arc (1948), starring Ingrid Bergman. In 1938 he starred in a revival of the Stokes brothers' play Oscar Wilde at London's Arts Theatre. He played the Attorney-General prosecuting the case defended by Robert Donat as barrister Sir Robert Morton, in the first film version of The Winslow Boy (1948).

Sullivan also acted in light comedies, including My Favorite Spy (1951), starring Bob Hope and Hedy Lamarr, in which he played an enemy agent, and the comedy Fiddlers Three (1944), portraying Nero. He also played the role of Pothinus in the film version of George Bernard Shaw's Caesar and Cleopatra (1945). The film was directed by Gabriel Pascal, and was the last film personally supervised by Shaw himself. Sullivan reprised the role in a stage revival of the play.

On television, Sullivan starred in "The Man Who Would Be King", the 17 October 1950, episode of Suspense.

Sullivan, who became a naturalised American citizen on 27 December 1954, won a Tony Award in 1955 for the Agatha Christie play Witness for the Prosecution. Earlier, he had played Christie's detective Hercule Poirot in the plays Black Coffee (1930) and Peril at End House (1940), and in the TV play Wasp's Nest (1937).

== Personal life and death ==
In 1935, Sullivan married stage designer Frances Joan Perkins in Westminster in London. In 1939 they were living at 'Hatch Hill' on Kingsley Green at Fernhurst in West Sussex. They remained married until his death.

Sullivan died on 19 November 1956 in Mount Sinai Hospital in New York City, aged 53.

== Filmography ==
- The Missing Rembrandt (1932) as Baron von Guntermann (film debut)
- The Chinese Puzzle (1932) as Herman Strumm
- When London Sleeps (1932) as Rodney Haines
- Called Back (1933) as Kaledin
- F.P.1 Doesn't Answer (1933) as A Sailor
- The Wandering Jew (1933) as Archbishop Juan de Texada
- Red Wagon (1933) as Cranley
- The Right to Live (1933) as Roger Stoneham
- The Fire Raisers (1934) as Stedding
- The Warren Case (1934) as Prosecuting Counsel (uncredited)
- The Return of Bulldog Drummond (1934) as Carl Peterson
- Princess Charming (1934) as Alakiev
- Chu Chin Chow (1934) as The Caliph
- What Happened Then? (1934) as Richard Bentley, Prosecution Counsel
- Jew Süss (1934) as Remchingen (uncredited)
- Great Expectations (1934) as Jaggers
- Cheating Cheaters (1934) as Dr. George Brockton
- Strange Wives (1934) as Bellamy
- The Mystery of Edwin Drood (1935) as Rev. Mr. Septimus Crisparkle
- Her Last Affaire (1935) as Sir Julian Weyre
- A Woman Alone (1936) as Prosecutor
- The Interrupted Honeymoon (1936) as Alphonse
- Spy of Napoleon (1936) as Chief of Police
- The Limping Man (1936) as Theodore Disher
- Action for Slander (1937) as Sir Quinton Jessops
- Wasp's Nest (1937, TV) as Hercule Poirot
- Non-Stop New York (1937) as Hugo Brant
- Dinner at the Ritz (1937) as Brogard
- Fine Feathers (1937) as Hugo Steinway
- The Drum (1938) as Governor
- Kate Plus Ten (1938) as Lord Flamborough
- The Citadel (1938) as Ben Chenkin
- Climbing High (1938) as Madman
- The Ware Case (1938) as Prosecuting Attorney
- The Gables Mystery (1938) as Power
- The Four Just Men (1939) as Léon Poiccard
- Young Man's Fancy (1939) as Blackbeard, Vincent St George
- 21 Days (1940) as Mander
- "Pimpernel" Smith (1941) as General von Graum
- The Day Will Dawn (1942) as Kommandant Ulrich Wettau
- The Foreman Went to France (1942) as French Skipper
- Lady from Lisbon (1942) as Minghetti
- The Butler's Dilemma (1943) as Leo Carrington
- Fiddlers Three (1944) as Nero
- Caesar and Cleopatra (1945) as Pothinus
- The Laughing Lady (1946) as Sir Williams Tremayne
- Great Expectations (1946) as Mr. Jaggers
- The Man Within (1947) as Mr. Braddock
- Take My Life (1947) as Prosecuting Counsel
- Broken Journey (1948) as Perami
- Oliver Twist (1948) as Mr. Bumble
- The Winslow Boy (1948) as Attorney General
- Joan of Arc (1948) as Pierre Cauchon (Count-Bishop of Beauvais)
- Christopher Columbus (1949) as Francisco de Bobadilla
- The Red Danube (1949) as Colonel Humphrey 'Blinker' Omicron
- Night and the City (1950) as Philip Nosseross
- Behave Yourself! (1951) as Fat Freddy
- My Favorite Spy (1951) as Karl Brubaker
- Caribbean Gold (1952) as Andrew MacAllister
- Sangaree (1953) as Dr. Bristol
- Plunder of the Sun (1953) as Thomas Berrien
- Drums of Tahiti (1954) as Commissioner Pierre Duvois
- The Prodigal (1955) as Bosra
- Hell's Island (1955) as Barzland (final film)
