= Pipp =

Pipp or pipps or variation, may refer to:

== Places ==
- Pipp Brook, a tributary of the River Mole in Surrey, England, UK
- Pipps Hill, Essex, England, UK; see List of United Kingdom locations: Peo-Pn

== People ==
- E.G. Pipp, a U.S. newspaperman, the founding editor of The Dearborn Independent
- Frank Pipp (born 1977), U.S. cyclist
- Wally Pipp (1893–1965), a U.S. baseball player, a Major League Baseball first baseman best known for being replaced by Lou Gehrig

== Fictional characters ==
- Pipp Petals, a character, a Pegasus in My Little Pony: A New Generation
- Pipp Wimpley, a character, an alien in the U.S. animated children's TV show Miles from Tomorrowland
- Ambrose Pipps, a character from Archie; see List of Archie Comics characters
- Amos Pipp, a character from the 1933 U.S. comedy film The Gay Nighties
- Mr. Pipp, Mrs. Pipp, Ida Pipp, Julia Pipp; several characters from the 1914 U.S. silent film The Education of Mr. Pipp
- Miss Pipps, a character from the 1941 Our Gang comedic short film Come Back, Miss Pipps
- Mr. Pipp, a character from the 1968 Soviet children's film Passenger from the "Equator"
- Dr. Pipp, a character from the 1925 U.S. comedic short film Circus Fever

== Other uses ==
- Pipp, a cross-translator for converting PHP to Parrot coding
- Pacific Institute of Public Policy (PiPP)
- Premature Infant Pain Profile (PIPP), a pain scale
- PIB5PA (phosphatidylinositol 4,5-bisphosphate 5-phosphatase A) also known as PIPP

== See also ==
- Pipp!n, a multimedia tech platform from Apple
- Pip (disambiguation), including PIPS
