= Performance improvement =

Business improvement process

Performance improvement is a broad category of management that refers to the systematic approach of identifying, measuring, and improving the efficiency and effectiveness of processes. It can be applied to individual or organizational performance, such as athletics or commercial businesses.

== Organizational development ==
In organizational development, "performance improvement" refers to a systematic approach in which an organization's managers or governing body implement programs intended to improve the performance of an individual or organization as measured by predetermined metrics. First, the organization determines which metrics to track and assesses current performance levels. It then develops and implements changes to organizational behavior and infrastructure intended to improve outcomes. At the organizational level, performance improvement usually involves softer forms of measurement, such as customer satisfaction surveys or reviews, which are used to obtain qualitative feedback from customers for performance improvement.

=== Corporate or Commercial ===
In business, organizations attempt to influence performance in sales, operations, and employee engagement through reward-based systems, sometimes drawing on motivational theories such as Maslow's hierarchy of needs. Some organizations use reward systems as part of performance improvement initiatives. These systems may include monetary and non-monetary incentives and are intended to influence employee morale. The effectiveness of non-cash compensation versus cash compensation varies by context, and empirical evidence on the question is mixed.

In some cases, monetary incentive plans may decrease employee morale, as seen in Microsoft's former stack-ranking system, where the total reward amount was fixed and employees were graded on an artificially fitted distribution.

=== Performance Improvement Plans (PIPs) ===
If an employee's performance is unsatisfactory, the employer may implement a performance improvement plan (PIP). This may be because the employee is failing to meet the goals for their role or due to other problems such as poor behavior or interpersonal skills. A PIP is typically a written document outlining clear expectations for the employee, explaining how the employee is failing to meet them, laying out what improvements are expected, explaining how managers will support the employee in improving, and indicating what the consequences will be if the employee fails to improve. These requirements are typically specific and measurable, and consequences for failing to meet them might include a transfer, demotion, or termination.

Typically, the employee's manager and someone from human resources would meet with the employee to discuss the PIP. According to Donald L. Kirkpatrick, a PIP should be developed by the manager and the employee together because it requires both of their participation in order to be successful.

The American Society for Human Resource Management recommends that "a PIP should be used when there is a commitment to help the employee improve", not just as a way to prepare to terminate the employee. In practice, however, many companies opt to use a PIP as a means to start or accelerate a desired termination. In the US, at the scheduled end of a PIP, only about 15% of employees have successfully completed the PIP; the other 85% do not. Most either get fired or quit by the end of it. In the US, some employees claim medical leave during the PIP time period, particularly for stress, sometimes as a means of triggering disability-related rules.

== Methods ==
Performance is an abstract concept and must be represented by concrete, measurable goals or objectives. For example, a baseball player's performance is abstract, as it encompasses various activities. Batting average is a concrete measure of a particular performance attribute for a particular game role.

Performance may involve an individual or a group acting collectively. The performance platform refers to the infrastructure, tools, or systems used to carry out the activity.

Performance improvement can be approached by optimizing the use of existing platforms or by modifying the platform itself in order to enable more effective outcomes.

For instance, in sports such as tennis and golf, there have been technological improvements in the equipment. The improved equipment, in turn, allows players to achieve better performance with no improvement in skill. The equipment itself, the golf club or the tennis racket, provides the player with a higher theoretical performance limit.

Performance is a measure of the results achieved. Performance efficiency is the ratio between effort expended and results achieved. The difference between current performance and the theoretical performance limit is called the performance improvement zone.

Another way to consider performance improvement is as improvement in four potential areas:

1. Input requirements, e.g., working capital, material, replacement or reorder time, and set-up requirements.
2. Throughput requirements, often viewed as process efficiency; this is measured in terms of time, waste, and resource utilization.
3. Output requirements, often viewed from a cost/price, quality, and functionality perspective.
4. Outcome requirements i.e., did it end up making a difference.

=== Cycle ===
Business performance management and improvement can be thought of as a cycle:

1. Performance planning where goals and objectives are established.
2. Performance coaching, where a manager intervenes to give feedback and adjust performance.
3. Performance appraisal where individual performance is formally documented and feedback delivered.

=== Behavior modification ===
Psychologist Abraham Maslow, in his hierarchy of needs, identified esteem and belonging, including recognition from family and peers, as basic human needs. Workplace recognition programs often draw on this framework to justify non-monetary rewards as drivers of performance. Maslow was a leading figure in humanistic psychology, sometimes called the "Third Force" because it positioned itself as an alternative to behaviorism and psychoanalysis, emphasizing the influence of culture and society on human behavior alongside individual psychology.

== See also ==
- Employee development
- Feedback
- Collaborative method
- Human performance technology
- Performance engineering
- Performance measurement
- Personal development
- Operations research
- Management science
