= Police information point =

A Police information point (PIP) is a staffed or unstaffed place of information about local policing that are run by British police forces for the benefit of local residents.

== About ==
Police Information Points were first introduced by Gloucestershire Police in 2010 as a way of getting the public to interact with their local policing team. Today, unstaffed PIPs, (sometimes called Library Information Points), are used by many police forces in the UK, and include such features as advice on crime reduction, details of the local Neighbourhood Policing Team and sometimes a message box for the local 'Beat Manager'. Staffed PIPs are run by police support volunteers (PSVs), who can direct people to local services, issue police forms to the public, receive and record lost and stolen property, and make appointments for visitors to speak to their neighbourhood officers.

Due to being staffed by volunteers, PIPs have limited opening hours of a few hours every few days.

== Police enquiry desks ==
Police information points are not to be confused with police enquiry desks, that are staffed by actual police officers. There are some tasks that PSVs aren't authorised to do, such as taking reports of crime, dealing with people reporting on bail, road traffic collisions and checking vehicle documents.

== See also ==
- Neighbourhood Policing Team
- Police community support officer
- Special constable
