= Polymerization-induced phase separation =

Polymerization-induced phase separation (PIPS) is the occurrence of phase separation in a multicomponent mixture induced by the polymerization of one or more components. The increase in molecular weight of the reactive component renders one or more components to be mutually immiscible in one another, resulting in spontaneous phase segregation.

== Types ==
Polymerization-induced phase separation can be initiated either through thermally induced polymerization or photopolymerization. The process generally occurs through spinodal decomposition, commonly resulting in the formation of co-continuous phases.

== Thermodynamic Theory of Phase Separation in PIPS ==
The process of polymerization-induced phase separation (PIPS) can be analyzed using classical polymer thermodynamics, most generally via the Flory-Huggins theory. This model provides a framework to quantify the balance between entropy and enthalpy during mixing. It illustrates how this balance changes during polymerization, potentially triggering spontaneous phase separation.

=== Flory-Huggins Lattice Model and Entropy of Mixing ===
- The Flory-Huggins theory considers a lattice model where each site is occupied by either species A or B (e.g., a polymer and a solvent). Assuming equal volume per lattice site, the entropy of mixing is derived from the number of distinct configurations of species on the lattice. For volume fractions Φ_{A} and φ_{B}, the entropy of mixing per site is:$\Delta S_{\text{mix}} = -k \left( \frac{\phi_A}{N_A} \ln \phi_A + \frac{\phi_B}{N_B} \ln \phi_B \right)$ where:
- $\phi_A$and $\phi_B$ are the volume fractions of each component
- $\N_A$and $\N_B$ are the degrees of polymerization, or the number of monomer units per chain
- $k$ is the Boltzmann constant.

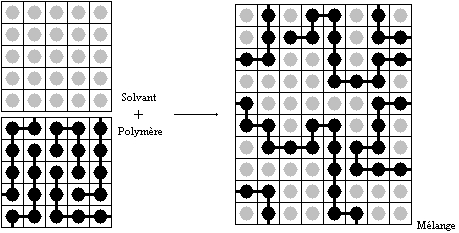
Fig.1: Mixture of polymers and solvent on a lattice.

As the polymer chains grow during polymerization, N increases, thus reducing the entropy of mixing. This is because the long polymer chains have fewer configurational possibilities compared to individual monomers, thereby reducing disorder, which can be intuitively understood by Figure 1.

=== Flory-Huggins Free Energy and the Onset of Phase Separation ===
The total free energy change of mixing is given by:

$\Delta F_{mix}=\Delta U_{mix}-T\Delta S_{mix}$.

In the Flory-Huggins framework, the enthalpic contribution is modeled using the Flory-Huggins interaction parameter $\chi$, yielding the total free energy per lattice site:

$\Delta F_{mix} = kT[\frac{\phi_A}{N_A} \ln \phi_A + \frac{\phi_B}{N_B} \ln(\phi_B + \chi \phi_A \phi_B)]$

where for polymer solutions, $N_A = N$ and $N_B = 1$ resulting in the Flory-Huggins equation for polymer solutions:

$\Delta F_{mix} = k[\frac{\phi_A}{N}\ln\phi_A + \phi_B\ln\phi_B + \chi\phi_A\phi_B]$

- $k$: Boltzmann constant
- $N$: The effective degree of polymerization
- $\phi_A,\phi_B$: The volume fractions of monomer species
- $\chi$: Takes account of the energy of inter-dispersing polymer and solvent molecules.

This equation combines the entropic penalty for mixing polymers (the first two terms in the equation) with the enthalpic preference or repulsion between species (the last term with $\chi$). A positive $\chi$ indicates unfavorable interactions (driving phase separation), while a negative $\chi$ favors mixing.

==== Derivation of the Flory Interaction Parameter $\chi$ ====
The parameter $\chi$ arises from the mean-field approximations of pairwise interactions on a lattice. Considering nearest-neighbor interactions $u_{AA},u_{BB},u_{AB}$, the average interaction energy of mixing per lattice site becomes:

$\Delta U_{mix}=\frac{z}{2} \phi_A \phi_B (2u_{AB} - u_{AA} - u_{BB})$

This leads to:

$\chi = \frac{z}{2}\frac{(2u_{AB}-u_{AA}-u_{BB})}{kT}$

- $z$ is the coordination number (number of neighbors per lattice site).
- $\chi$ is thus a dimensionless measure of the energetic favorability of mixing versus separating.

==== Stability Analysis via Free Energy Derivatives ====
Phase separation occurs when the mixed system becomes thermodynamically unstable. This is evaluated via the second derivative of the free energy with respect to composition:

$\frac{\partial^2 \Delta F_{mix}}{\partial \phi_A^2} = kT[\frac{1}{N_A\phi_A}+\frac{1}{N_B\phi_B}-2\chi]$

This can be intuitively understood by picturing the free energy as an energy landscape in which systems roll downhill to lower the free energy:

- If the second derivative is positive, the system is stable, and the free energy landscape is convex. Small fluctuations will relax back to the state of equilibrium.
- If it is zero, this is an inflection point, and the system is at the spinodal point, indicating marginal stability.
- If it is negative, the free energy curve will be concave, and thus the system is unstable, and spontaneous fluctuations will grow, leading to phase separation.

During PIPS, as polymer chains grow (N increases), the entropic terms shrink and the system becomes increasingly dominated by enthalpic contributions. This evolution of the free energy landscape makes the system more likely to undergo phase separation.

==== Conditions for Spinodal Decomposition ====
The onset of instability occurs when:

$\chi > \frac{1}{2} \left( \frac{1}{N \phi_A} + \frac{1}{\phi_B} \right)$

This is the unstable, phase-separating condition. As polymerization occurs, $N$ approaches $\infty$, thus promoting spontaneous phase separation. Therefore, at small values of $N$, $\Delta F_{mix}$ is convex, meaning the system is stable and prefers a single homogeneous phase. As $N$ increases, the entropic term becomes dominated by the enthalpic term as a consequence of chain connectivity, and mixing becomes thermodynamically unfavorable. Spontaneous phase separation occurs to reduce the system's total free energy.

==== Conclusions from the Thermodynamic Basis of PIPS ====
PIPS occurs due to the evolving thermodynamic energy landscape during polymerization. As polymer chains grow:

- The entropy of mixing decreases due to the restricted configurational freedom from chain connectivity
- Free energy becomes increasingly dominated by the enthalpic energy contributions (particularly when $\chi > 0$)
- Instability occurs when the system's free energy curvature becomes negative (shown in the second derivative), leading to spontaneous phase separation.

While the Flory-Huggins model provides a strong starting point for understanding PIPS, it does not fully capture the true nature of this process. Its limitations stem from:

- The mean-field approximation ignores fluctuations and spatial correlations (random mixing), which becomes inaccurate at critical points.
- It is a purely thermodynamic model- PIPS is a dynamic process with kinetics that are unaccounted for in the Flory-Huggins model.
- Viscoelastic effects of polymers are not captured by the Flory-Huggins model.
- The model assumes constant $\chi$, which is not accurate as it may vary with temperature, composition, or the polymerization process.
- Volume change and compressibility are completely ignored.

For more comprehensive models of PIPS, researchers often use the Flory-Huggins as a base model and further expand it with:

- Time-dependent Ginzburg-Landau or Cahn Hilliard models.
- Reaction-Diffusion models.
- Self-Consistent Field Theory.
- Monte Carlo or Dynamics Simulations.

== Control over morphology ==
The morphology of the final phase separated structures are generally random owing to the stochastic nature of the onset and process of phase separation. Several approaches have been investigated to control morphology. Tran-Cong-Miyata and co-workers using periodic irradiation in photoreactive polymer blends to control morphology, specifically width of the resultant spinodal modes in the phase separated morphology. Li and co-workers employed holography, a process of holographic polymerization, in to order to direct the phase separated structure to have the same patterns as the holographic field. Recently, Hosein and co-workers demonstrated that nonlinear optical pattern formations that occur in photopolymer systems may be used to direct the organization of blends to have the same morphology as the light pattern.

== Applications ==
The process is commonly used in control of the morphology of polymer blends, for applications in thermoelectrics, solid-state lighting, polymer electrolytes, composites, membrane formation, and surface pattern formations.

== Sources ==
- Rubinstein, Michael; Colby, Ralph H. (2003). Polymer Physics. doi:10.1093/oso/9780198520597.001.0001. ISBN 978-0-19-852059-7.
