= List of Dickensian characters =

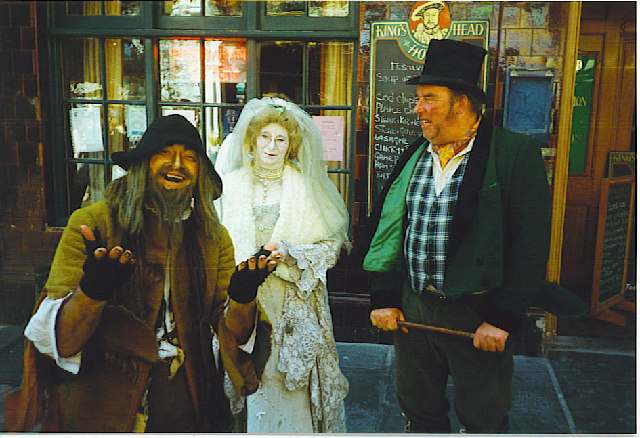
Actors dressed as Fagin, Miss Havisham and Bill Sikes at a Dickens festival in Rochester.

This is a list of fictional characters in the works of Charles Dickens.

Contents: A | B | C | D | E | F | G | H | I | J | K | L | M | N | O | P | Q | R | S | T | U | V | W | X | Y | Z |

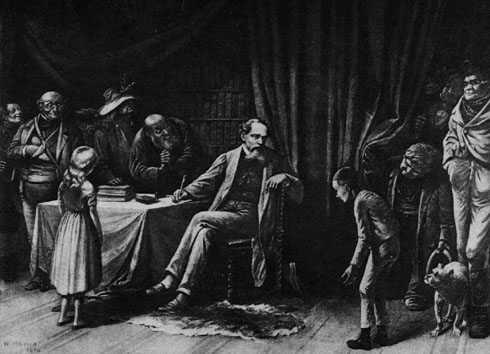
Charles Dickens receiving his characters, drawing by William Holbrook Beard (1824-1900)

== A ==
- Adams The top student David Copperfield's class at Dr Strong's school in Canterbury.
- Aged Parent is the very old and very deaf father of John Wemmick in Great Expectations.
- Allen, Arabella is the sister of Benjamin Allen, and eventually Mr Winkle's wife, in The Pickwick Papers.
- Allen, Benjamin is a medical student and later a doctor in The Pickwick Papers. Brother of Arabella Allen.
- Artful Dodger (alias Jack Dawkins) is a street-smart pickpocket. He is the most successful and interesting of Fagin's thieves. He shows Oliver the ropes of the pickpocket game and is later captured and sentenced to transportation in Oliver Twist.
- Ayresleigh, Mr is a prisoner in The Pickwick Papers.
- Avenger, The is a servant boy who was hired by Pip in Great Expectations. Pip has such a hard time finding things to keep him busy "that I sometimes sent him to Hyde Park Corner to see what o'clock it was."

== B ==
- Bachelor, The, is friend to the parson in the village church where Nell and her grandfather end their journey. He turns out to be the brother of Mr Garland and is instrumental in helping the Single Gentleman find his brother, Nell's grandfather, in The Old Curiosity Shop.
- Badger, Bayham, is a doctor, cousin of Kenge, to whom Richard Carstone is apprenticed. Badger's wife Laura talks incessantly about her two former husbands, Captain Swosser and Professor Dingo, in Bleak House.
- Bagman, The One-eyed, is a middle-aged story-teller in The Pickwick Papers.
- Bagnet family, The A musical and military family headed by Matthew, an old army friend of George Rouncewell. Bagnet's wife, the old girl, knows Matthew so well that he always calls upon her to supply his opinion. The Bagnet children Quebec, Malta, and Woolwich are named after the military bases where the family has been stationed. Matthew is guarantor to George's loan from Smallweed, when Smallweed calls in the debt George is forced to deliver a document Smallweed needs to help lawyer Tulkinghorn learn Lady Dedlock's secret in Bleak House.
- Bagstock, Major Joseph Neighbour of Miss Tox and friend of Paul Dombey who introduces Paul to Edith Granger and Mrs Skewton in Dombey and Son
- Bamber, Jack is an old man whom Mr Pickwick meets in The Pickwick Papers.
- Bantam, Angelo Cyrus is the Master of Ceremonies at a ball in The Pickwick Papers.
- Barbara Modest and pretty servant of the Garlands. She befriends Kit when he is also employed by the Garlands. Barbara later marries Kit in The Old Curiosity Shop.
- Barbary, Miss 'Godmother' who raises Esther Summerson. Later found to be Esther's aunt, the sister of Lady Dedlock in Bleak House.
- Bardell, Martha is Mr Pickwick's landlady in The Pickwick Papers. After a misunderstanding which leads her to believe that Pickwick has proposed marriage to her, she starts a breach of promise action against him, encouraged by the unscrupulous attorneys Dodson and Fogg.
- Bardell, Thomas is the son of Martha Bardell in The Pickwick Papers.
- Barkis A carrier between Blunderstone and Yarmouth. He marries Clara Peggotty in David Copperfield
- Barley, Old Bill Clara Barley's bedridden father, a retired ship's purser, who suffers with gout which he treats with an abundance of rum and pepper in Great Expectations.
- Barley, Clara Herbert Pocket's fiancée, she cares for her invalid father, Old Bill Barley, in a waterside house at Mill Pond Bank where Magwitch is hidden. After her father's death she marries Herbert in Great Expectations.
- Barnacle family, The Controls the Circumlocution Office, where everything goes round in circles, and nothing ever gets done. Includes Lord Decimus Tite Barnacle, his wife, Lady Jemima Bilberry, nephew Tite Barnacle, and his son Clarence Barnacle (Barnacle Junior) in Little Dorrit. William and Ferdinand Barnacle also appear. The family is allied by marriage with the Stiltstalkings.
- Barsad, John (alias Solomon Pross) Barsad testifies against Charles Darnay at the treason trial at the Old Bailey. Later Barsad turns up as a spy in Paris and is found to be the brother of Miss Pross. Threatened with exposure, Barsad helps Sydney Carton exchange places with Charles Darnay in prison in A Tale of Two Cities.
- Bates, Charley Member of Fagin's band of thieves. Often referred to by Dickens as "Master Bates." He mends his ways after Fagin is captured in Oliver Twist.
- Bazzard Clerk to Hiram Grewgious who writes an unproduced tragedy, The Thorn of Anxiety. Grewgious admits that Bazzard has a strange power over him in The Mystery of Edwin Drood.
- Belle Scrooge's former fiancée who left him after his obsession with wealth eclipsed his love for her. She later marries another man and has many children, and is dismayed to learn from her husband on the eve of Jacob Marley's death that Scrooge has grown more cruel and selfish since she knew him. Scrooge had forgotten about her until reminded by the Ghost of Christmas Past in A Christmas Carol.
- Benjamin Member of the 'Prentice Knights with Simon Tappertit in Barnaby Rudge.
- Betsy (alias Bet), Prostitute and friend of Nancy. Goes mad after identifying Nancy's body in Oliver Twist.
- Bevan, Mr Boston doctor whom Martin and Mark meet at Pawkins' Boarding House in New York and one of the few positive characters they meet in the America. Bevan later loans them money to return to England in Martin Chuzzlewit.
- Biddy is Mr Wopsle's great-aunt's granddaughter in Great Expectations. She helps with running Mr Wopsle's great-aunt's evening school and general store until the woman passes away. Then she comes to live with Pip and the Gargerys to care for Mrs Joe, who lost the ability to speak after being attacked. "She was not beautiful--she was common, and could not be like Estella--but she was pleasant and wholesome and sweet-tempered. She had not been with us more than a year (I remember her being newly out of mourning at the time it struck me), when I observed to myself one evening that she had curiously thoughtful and attentive eyes; eyes that were very pretty and very good." Earlier in the novel she is Pip's friend and teaches him to read, but later in the novel they grow apart as Pip becomes a gentleman. Spurned by Pip, though he later realizes that he loves her, she marries Joe Gargery.
- Bitzer A student in Gradgrind's school of hard facts. Later a light porter in Bounderby's bank in Hard Times.
- Blackpool, Stephen A worker in Bounderby's mill. His wife is a drunk and he befriends Rachael. He falls out with his employer and leaves to look for work elsewhere. He is accused of robbing the bank and before his name is cleared he falls down a well and dies. Later he is cleared with the discovery that the robbery was committed by young Tom Gradgrind in Hard Times.
- Blimber, Cornelia is a prim school-matron in Dombey & Son.
- Boffin, Henrietta Noddy Boffin's wife in Our Mutual Friend.
- Boffin, Noddy John Harmon's servant. When John's son is supposed drowned, Boffin and his wife inherit the Harmon fortune, in Our Mutual Friend.
- Bounderby, Josiah Coketown Banker, mill owner, and 'self-made man' proud that he raised himself in the streets after being abandoned as a child. His story is exposed as a sham when Mrs Pegler, his loving mother whom he has discarded, is found. Bounderby marries his friend Gradgrind's daughter, Louisa, and later discards her in Hard Times.
- Boythorn, Lawrence A former soldier and an old friend of John Jarndyce in Bleak House. He is very loud and harsh, but goodhearted, and always speaks in superlatives. He is a neighbour of Sir Leicester Dedlock, with whom he is engaged in an epic tangle of lawsuits over a right-of-way across Boythorn's property that Sir Leicester asserts the legal right to close. The character is based on Walter Savage Landor.
- Brass, Sally Sister and partner of Quilp's unscrupulous attorney, Sampson Brass, in The Old Curiosity Shop.
- Brass, Sampson "An attorney of no good repute" and "One of the greatest scoundrels unhung". Brass served as Daniel Quilp's lawyer. He helps Quilp get the Curiosity Shop from Nell's grandfather and when he tries to help Quilp frame Kit Nubbles he is undone with the help of his clerk Dick Swiveller and the Marchioness, his below-stairs maid in The Old Curiosity Shop.
- Bray, Madeline Girl with whom Nicholas falls in love when he first sees her at an employment office. She cares for her selfish, invalid father who tries to sell her in marriage to Arthur Gride, assisted by Ralph Nickleby. Her father dies and the scheme is exposed. She marries Nicholas at the end of the story in Nicholas Nickleby.
- Bray, Walter Tyrannical father of Madeline. Heavily in debt, and living in the Rules of the King's Bench debtors' prison, he promises his daughter's hand in marriage to Arthur Gride in return for the forgiveness of his debt to Gride and Ralph Nickleby. He dies on the morning of the wedding thus saving Madeline from the unwanted marriage Nicholas Nickleby.
- Brick, Jefferson War correspondent for the New York Rowdy Journal, edited by Colonel Diver in Martin Chuzzlewit.
- Browdie, John Son of a small corn-factor. He gives money to Nicholas Nickleby on his escape from Dotheboys Hall. John marries Matilda Price. Later assists in Smike's escape from Squeers in London in Nicholas Nickleby.
- Brown, Good Mrs An ugly old rag and bone vendor and mother of Alice Marwood (Brown). She kidnaps Florence Dombey and steals her clothes. Later she helps Dombey find Carker and Edith after their elopement. Dickens describes Good Mrs Brown as a "very ugly old woman, with red rims round her eyes, and a mouth that mumbled and chattered of itself when she was not speaking" in Dombey and Son.
- Brown, Alice (alias Marwood) Daughter of Good Mrs Brown and cousin of Edith Granger in Dombey and Son.
- Brownlow, Mr Befriends Oliver after he is charged with pickpocketing. He later establishes Oliver's true identity and adopts him in Oliver Twist.

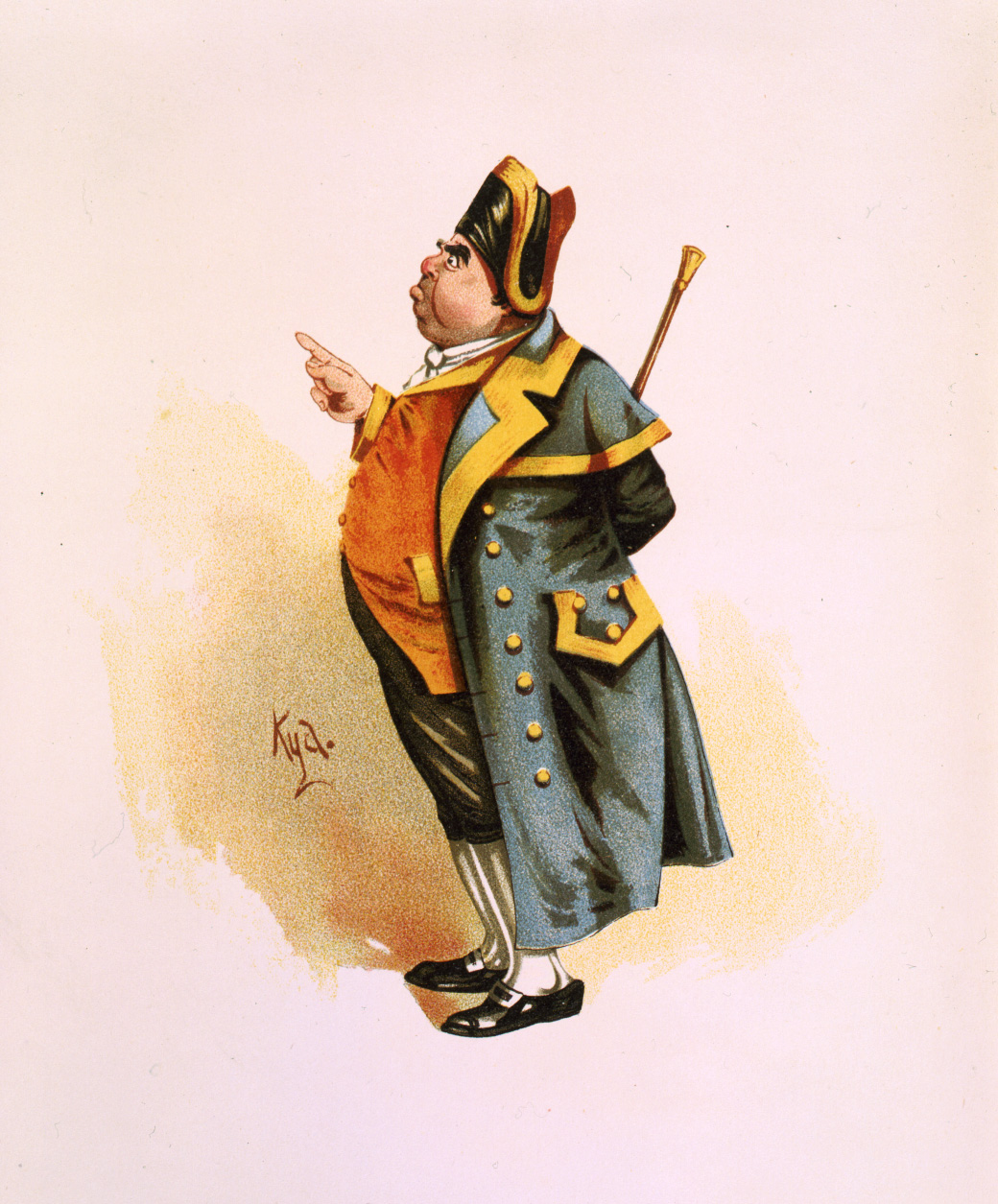
Bumble, the beadle, caricature by Joseph Clayton Clarke

- Bucket, Inspector is a policeman in Bleak House. He undertakes several investigations in the course of the novel, most notably the investigation of Mr Tulkinghorn's murder, which he brings to a successful conclusion.
- Bud, Rosa Betrothed to Edwin Drood in childhood, they later agree that they cannot marry. Edwin disappears and John Jasper declares his love for Rosa. In terror she flees to London to her guardian, Grewgious. "The pet pupil of the Nuns' House is Miss Rosa Bud, of course called Rosebud; wonderfully pretty, wonderfully childish, wonderfully whimsical. An awkward interest (awkward because romantic) attaches to Miss Bud in the minds of the young ladies, on account of its being known to them that a husband has been chosen for her by will and bequest, and that her guardian is bound down to bestow her on that husband when he comes of age" in The Mystery of Edwin Drood.
- Bumble is the beadle of the parish that operates the workhouse depicted in Oliver Twist.
- Bunsby, Jack Sea-faring friend of Captain Cuttle who is always called in times of crisis for advice. The advice given confounds everyone listening except his friend Cuttle, who values it immensely. Bunsby is later trapped into marriage by Mrs MacStinger. Bunsby's ship is the Cautious Clara. Bunsby is described by Dickens as having "one stationary eye in the mahogany face, and one revolving one, on the principle of some lighthouses" in Dombey and Son.
- Buzfuz, Serjeant a Barrister who represents Mrs Bardell in her suit against Samuel Pickwick. He bullies the witnesses into giving incriminating testimony and Pickwick is falsely convicted in The Pickwick Papers.

== C ==
- Camilla is one of the four "toadies and humbugs" who call on Mrs Havisham in Great Expectations. The four are family members of Miss Havisham's who visit on her birthday ostensibly out of concern for her, but really out of interest in her estate.
- Carker, Harriet Sister to James and John. Harriet lives with John and the two inherit James' fortune and donate it, anonymously, to Mr Dombey. Harriet later marries Mr Morfin in Dombey and Son.
- Carker, James Opportunistic manager at Dombey and Son. Brother of John and Harriet Carker, he elopes with Dombey's wife and is later killed when struck by a train. Dickens describes Carker as "a gentleman thirty-eight or forty years old, of a florid complexion, and with two unbroken rows of glistening teeth, whose regularity and whiteness were quite distressing. It was impossible to escape the observation of them, for he showed them whenever he spoke; and bore so wide a smile upon his countenance (a smile, however, very rarely, indeed, extending beyond his mouth), that there was something in it like the snarl of a cat."
- Carker, John Older brother of James although called 'the Junior' because of his low position at the firm of Dombey and Son. He is looked upon with scorn by his younger brother because he was caught embezzling money from the firm when a young man. Harriet Carker is his sister in Dombey and Son.
- Carstone, Richard is a ward of Chancery in Bleak House. He tries to make his own way in the world - in medicine, law and soldiering - but the Jarndyce case becomes his obsession and eventually his ruin. He becomes engaged to, and later secretly marries, Ada Clare, the other ward.
- Carton, Sydney is a lawyer in A Tale of Two Cities.
- Casby, Christopher is often described as the Patriarch. Landlord of Bleeding Heart Yard in Little Dorrit.
- Cavalletto, John Baptist Small time Italian smuggler and Rigaud's fellow prisoner at the start of Little Dorrit. Later employed by Arthur Clennam in Bleeding Heart Yard after being injured in a mail coach accident, and helps in the search for Rigaud.

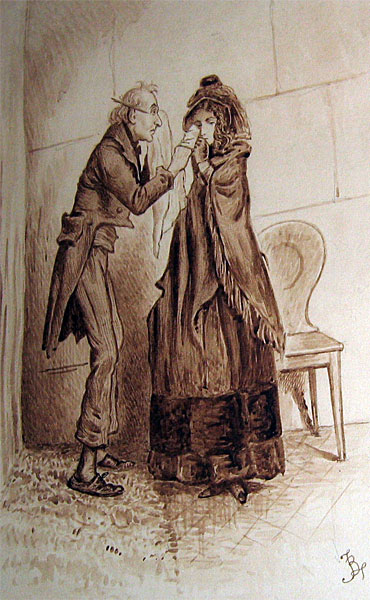
Newman Noggs and Kate Nickleby - Charles Dickens

- Chadband, Reverend Hypocritical clergyman, admonishing Jo in the spirit while Jo starves. Marries the former Mrs Rachael in Bleak House.
- Cheeryble Brothers Charles and Edwin (Ned). Benevolent businessmen who employ and befriend Nicholas Nickleby and his family. Frank Cheeryble, who marries Kate Nickleby, is their nephew in Nicholas Nickleby.
- Cheeryble, Frank Nephew of the Cheeryble brothers who marries Kate Nickleby in Nicholas Nickleby.
- Chester, Edward Son of John, eventually overcomes the opposition of his father and her uncle and marries Emma Haredale. The couple relocate to the West Indies in Barnaby Rudge.
- Chester, John Father of Edward, tries to prevent Edward's marriage to Emma Haredale. Becomes a member of Parliament. Killed in a duel by Emma's uncle Geoffrey in Barnaby Rudge.
- Chick, Louisa Sister of Paul Dombey Sr and friend to Mrs Tox in Dombey and Son. Quote: "Make an effort".
- Chickenstalker, Anne A stout lady who keeps a shop in the general line to whom Trotty owes some small debts. In Trotty's dream she marries Tugby and is Meg's landlady in The Chimes.
- Chivery, John is usually designated Young John in Little Dorrit.
- Chivery, Mr and Mrs Parents of John. Mr Chivery is the turnkey of the Marshalsea Prison in Little Dorrit.
- Chowser, Col. appears in Nicholas Nickleby. A gambling, villainous sycophant of Sir Mulberry Hawk.
- Chuzzlewit, Anthony Brother of old Martin Chuzzlewit and father of Jonas Chuzzlewit. Greedy and tight-fisted business man who breeds these same qualities into his son, Jonas, who tries to poison him for his trouble in Martin Chuzzlewit.
- Chuzzlewit, Jonas Son of Anthony Chuzzlewit, he attempts to kill his father to gain his inheritance. Marries Mercy Pecksniff and, through his cruelty, breaks her spirit. He murders Tigg, the murder is discovered, and on the way to prison poisons himself in Martin Chuzzlewit.
- Chuzzlewit, Martin Grandson of Martin Sr. He has a falling out with his grandfather over his love for Mary Graham. Becomes a pupil of Pecksniff who, because of pressure from the grandfather, throws young Martin out. After a trip to America with Mark Tapley, he comes back to England and, after the undoing of Pecksniff, reconciles with his grandfather and marries Mary Graham in Martin Chuzzlewit.
- Chuzzlewit, Old Martin Grandfather of Martin, cousin of Pecksniff, brother of Anthony, uncle of Jonas. Martin is suspicious of his hypocritical close relatives, chiefly Pecksniff, whose hypocrisy Martin exposes and is reconciled with his grandson, young Martin in Martin Chuzzlewit.
- Clare, Ada A ward of Chancery in Jarndyce and Jarndyce, in Bleak House. She falls in love with Richard Carstone, another ward, who is a distant cousin. She does not share his fervent hopes for a quick settlement in the Jarndyce case. They later marry in secret.
- Claypole, Noah appears in Oliver Twist as an assistant at Sowerberry's with whom Oliver fights. He later joins Fagin's gang.
- Clennam, Arthur Protagonist in Little Dorrit.
- Clennam, Mrs Mother of Arthur Clennam in Little Dorrit.
- Compeyson is the debonair con man at the heart of much misery in Great Expectations. Partnering with Miss Havisham's half brother Arthur, he pretends to woo Miss Havisham while extorting money and title to her father's brewing business from her. He uses Abel Magwitch in a bank note forging scheme, then uses his class standing and powers of persuasion to evade the heavy sentence handed to Magwitch. Escaping from a prison ship, Magwitch attempts to murder Compeyson on the marsh where they are discovered by Pip. Later, Compeyson uses Orlick to hunt down Magwitch when he enters England under the false identity of Provis.
- Copperfield, Clara Mother of David Copperfield. A widow when David is born, she later is lured into marriage by Edward Murdstone, who destroys her spirit and she dies along with her newborn son while David is away at school in David Copperfield.
- Copperfield, David Narrator of the story modelled after Dickens's life. Begins life with his widowed mother and their maid, Peggotty. When his mother marries Mr Murdstone his life becomes miserable. He is sent to Creakle's school where he meets Steerforth and Traddles. After the death of his mother he goes to work at Murdstone and Grinby and is lodged with the Micawbers. David runs away to live with his aunt Betsy Trotwood in Dover. He later marries his employer Spenlow's daughter, Dora. Dora dies and David marries longtime friend, Agnes Wickfield. David, like Dickens, becomes a successful author in David Copperfield.
- Corney, Mrs Matron of the work-house where Oliver is born. She marries Bumble making him miserable. The Bumbles are disgraced and end up as paupers in the work-house they once ruled over in Oliver Twist.
- Cousin Raymond is Camilla's self-interested husband who calls on Miss Havisham in hopes of sharing in her estate in Great Expectations.
- Cratchit, Bob Longsuffering clerk of Ebenezer Scrooge. Bob endures Scrooge's mistreatment until Scrooge, reformed by the visit of the three spirits, raises Bob's salary and vows to help his struggling family. The Cratchit family consists of Bob's wife, eldest daughter Martha, daughter Belinda, son Peter, two younger children: boy and girl, and Tiny Tim in A Christmas Carol.
- Cratchit, Tiny Tim Crippled son of Bob Cratchit. The forecast of Tim's death by the Ghosts of Christmas Present and Future is instrumental in Scrooge's reformation after which Tim is afforded proper medical attention and is cured in A Christmas Carol. Dickens based Tiny Tim (and also Paul Dombey Jr) on his sister Fanny's crippled son Henry Burnett Jr.
- Creakle Severe headmaster of Salem House Academy where David first goes to school. He was based on William Jones, headmaster of Wellington Academy which Dickens attended from 1825 to 1827 in David Copperfield.
- Crewler, Sophy Fiancée of Traddles and "the dearest girl in the world". Traddles has trouble gaining permission to marry Sophy because she is indispensable to her large family in David Copperfield.
- Crimple, David (Crimp) Pawnbroker (Crimp) and later partner with Tigg Montigue in the Anglo-Bengalee Disinterested Loan and Life Assurance Company. After Montigue is murdered he flees the country with the company's money in Martin Chuzzlewit.
- Cripples, Mr Operates Cripples's Evening Academy in the same lodging house where Frederick Dorrit lives. Amy Dorrit attended classes there in Little Dorrit. His son, Master Cripples, is also a character.
- Crisparkle, Canon Minor canon of Cloisterham Cathedral. "Mr Crisparkle, Minor Canon, early riser, musical, classical, cheerful, kind, good-natured, social, contented, and boy-like." He takes Neville Landless as a pupil and helps Neville flee to London when suspicion is cast on him for the disappearance of Edwin Drood in The Mystery of Edwin Drood.
- Crummles, Mrs is the wife of Mr Crummles and a gracious lady of the theatre in Nicholas Nickleby.
- Crummles, Vincent is Head of the Crummles theatre troupe in Nicholas Nickleby.
- Cruncher, Jerry is the porter at Tellson's Bank in A Tale of Two Cities.
- Cruncher, Mrs, the wife of Jerry Cruncher, whom he beats for 'flopping' (praying) in A Tale of Two Cities.
- Cuttle, Captain a Seafaring friend of Sol Gills, whose shop he cares for when Sol goes in search of his lost nephew, Walter Gay. Quote: When found, make a note of. Dickens describes Captain Cuttle as "a gentleman in a wide suit of blue, with a hook instead of a hand attached to his right wrist; very bushy black eyebrows; and a thick stick in his left hand, covered all over (like his nose) with knobs. He wore a loose black silk handkerchief round his neck, and such a very large coarse shirt collar, that it looked like a small sail in Dombey and Son.

== D ==
- Daisy, Solomon Clerk and bell-ringer at the parish church in Chigwell. Friend of John Willet at the Maypole Inn. Daisy tells the story of Reuben Haredale's murder in Barnaby Rudge.
- Darnay, Charles Son of Marquis de St Evremonde. He is tried for treason in London and is acquitted due to his resemblance to Sydney Carton. He marries Lucie Manette, daughter of Dr Manette. He returns to Paris to help a friend imprisoned there and is arrested by the revolutionaries. His life is saved when look-alike Carton takes his place on the guillotine in A Tale of Two Cities.
- Dartle, Rosa Companion to Mrs Steerforth, jealously in love with Steerforth, who marked her face when he was a child by throwing a hammer in a fit of temper. Rosa hates Emily for running away with Steerforth. Narrator David Copperfield describes Rosa as "A slight short figure, dark, and not agreeable to look at, but with some appearance of good looks too... I concluded in my own mind that she was about thirty years of age, and that she wished to be married. She was a little dilapidated, like a house, with having been so long to let; yet had, as I have said, an appearance of good looks. Her thinness seemed to be the effect of some wasting fire within her, which found a vent in her gaunt eyes." in David Copperfield.
- Datchery, Dick Mysterious visitor to Cloisterham whose "white head was unusually large, and his shock of white hair was unusually thick and ample." Datchery keeps an eye on John Jasper after the disappearance of Edwin Drood. The true identity of Datchery is one of the most contested points of the uncompleted mystery. It is widely believed that Datchery is one of the characters in the book in disguise, most likely candidates include Neville, Bazzard, Tartar, Helena, or even Edwin Drood himself in The Mystery of Edwin Drood.
- Dawkins, Jack see Artful Dodger
- Dedlock, Lady Honoria the haughty mistress of Chesney Wold in Bleak House. Her past drives much of the plot as it turns out that, before her marriage, she had an affair with another man and had his child. She discovers the child's identity (Esther Summerson) and, because she has made this discovery and revealed that she had a secret predating her marriage, she has attracted the noxious curiosity of Mr Tulkinghorn, who feels himself bound by his ties to his client, Sir Leicester, to pry out her secret and use it to control her. At the end, she dies, disgraced in her own mind and convinced that her aristocratic husband can never forgive her moral failings, even though he has already done so.
- Dedlock, Sir Leicester a crusty baronet in Bleak House, very much older than his wife. Dedlock is an unthinking conservative who regards the Jarndyce and Jarndyce lawsuit in which his wife is entangled as a mark of distinction worthy of a man of his family lineage.
- Dedlock, Volumnia Poor relation of Sir Leicester Dedlock. 'Rouged and necklaced' hanger-on at Chesney Wold in Bleak House.
- Defarge, Ernest Husband of Madame Defarge and keeper of a wine shop in Paris. He is a leader among the revolutionaries in A Tale of Two Cities.
- Defarge, Madame Wife of wine shop keeper, Ernest Defarge, and a leader among the revolutionaries. She harbours an intense hatred of Charles Darnay for atrocities committed against her family by the Evremonde family. Madame Defarge is killed in a struggle with Miss Pross in Paris in A Tale of Two Cities.
- Dennis, Ned is the Executioner at Tyburn, becomes involved in the Gordon Riots and is executed in Barnaby Rudge.
- Deputy (Winks) Boy hired by Durdles to throw stones at him when he is wandering drunk at night. "Sometimes the stones hit him, and sometimes they miss him, but Durdles seems indifferent to either fortune. The hideous small boy, on the contrary, whenever he hits Durdles, blows a whistle of triumph through a jagged gap, convenient for the purpose, in the front of his mouth, where half his teeth are wanting; and whenever he misses him, yelps out 'Mulled agin!' and tries to atone for the failure by taking a more correct and vicious aim." Deputy resides at the Travellers' Twopenny in The Mystery of Edwin Drood.
- Dick (Young Dick) is a friend of Oliver in Oliver Twist. He grew up with him in the parish farm run by Mrs Mann.
- Dick, Mr An eccentric lodger at Betsy Trotwood's and friend of David Copperfield. whose real name is Richard Babley in David Copperfield.
- Dilber, Mrs Scrooge's charwoman who sells his bed linen and curtains to Old Joe when Scrooge is shown shadows of the future by the Ghost of Christmas Future in A Christmas Carol.
- Diver, Colonel Editor of the New York Rowdy Journal. Diver meets Mark and Martin on board the Screw and directs them to Pawkins boarding house in Martin Chuzzlewit.
- Dodson and Fogg Sharp dealing lawyers who dupe Mrs Bardell into bringing a breach of promise to marry suit against Samuel Pickwick in Pickwick Papers .
- Dolls, Mr is the drunken father of Jenny Wren whom she refers to as her 'bad child' in Our Mutual Friend.
- Dombey, Fanny First wife of Paul Dombey and mother of Florence and Paul Jr at whose birth she dies in Dombey and Son.
- Dombey, Florence Neglected daughter of Paul Dombey and sister of little Paul whom she nurses in his illness. She marries Walter Gay and is eventually reconciled with her father in Dombey and Son.
- Dombey, Paul Powerful head of the House of Dombey. He wants a son, and when a daughter (Florence) is born he despises her. His second child, a son (also Paul), is weak and sickly and dies a child. Paul's first wife dies with the birth of Paul Jr and he remarries. His second wife, Edith Granger, does not love him and eventually runs away with Carker, a manager at the firm. With Carker gone, Paul is incapable of managing the business and it fails. Paul ends his days reconciled with his daughter and doting on his grandchildren, little Paul, but especially little Florence in Dombey and Son.
- Dombey, Paul Jr The long hoped-for heir to the house of Dombey and Son. His mother dies at his birth leaving him a frail and sickly child. His father sends him to Brighton in the care of Mrs Pipchin hoping the sea air will bolster his failing health. He then attends Dr Blimber's school and his health continues to decline. Paul returns home to London and dies in the care of his sister, Florence, leaving the firm of Dombey and Son without an heir. Dickens modeled Paul (and also Tiny Tim) on his sister Fanny's crippled son Henry Burnett Jr in Dombey and Son.
- Dorrit, Amy Commonly called "Little Dorrit". Daughter of William Dorrit, born in the Marshalsea debtors' prison. She works for Mrs Clennam and befriends Arthur. Her father inherits a fortune and they leave the prison and travel abroad. After her father's death she discovers that the fortune has been lost in a banking scam. She nurses Arthur in the Marshalsea when his fortune is lost in the same banking scam. The novel ends with the marriage of Arthur and Amy at St George's Church, next to the prison, the same church where she was christened.
- Dorrit, Edward (Tip) Ne'er-do-well brother of Amy Dorrit in Little Dorrit.
- Dorrit, Fanny Sister of Amy. A dancer with social aspirations, Fanny marries Edmund Sparkler, Stepson of Mr Merdle. Fanny and Sparkler lose everything in the Merdle banking scam in Little Dorrit.
- Dorrit, Frederick Brother of William, Uncle of Fanny, Edward, and Amy. He plays clarionet in a small-time theatre. He is due an inheritance but the knowledge is kept from him by the intrigues of Mrs Clennam in Little Dorrit.
- Dorrit, William Father of Amy (title character), Fanny, and Edward, and long-time inmate of the Marshalsea debtors' prison. He inherits an estate and leaves the prison, traveling in style with his daughters. After his death Amy learns that his fortune has been lost in the Merdle banking scam in Little Dorrit.
- Doyce, Daniel Inventor of an unspecified mechanical wonder which he is unable to get a patent for in the Circumlocution Office. He partners with Arthur Clennam who loses the firm's money in the Merdle scandal. Doyce later sells the invention abroad and returns to liberate Arthur from the Marshalsea in Little Dorrit.
- Drood, Edwin An orphan, Edwin has been promised to Rosa Bud since early childhood. Later Edwin and Rosa rebel against the arrangement. Rosa is also wooed by Edwin's uncle John Jasper. Edwin turns up missing and his watch is found in the river. Jasper hints suspicion of Neville Landless in the disappearance when the novel ends abruptly with the death of Dickens in 1870 in The Mystery of Edwin Drood.
- Drummle, Bentley is Pip's fellow student at Matthew Pocket's and rival for Estella's affections. "Bentley Drummle, who was so sulky a fellow that he even took up a book as if its writer had done him an injury, did not take up an acquaintance in a more agreeable spirit. Heavy in figure, movement, and comprehension--in the sluggish complexion of his face, and in the awkward tongue that seemed to loll about in his mouth as he himself lolled about in a room--he was idle, proud, niggardly, reserved and suspicious." He marries Estella for her money and abuses her. He is killed when kicked by a horse that he has mistreated in Great Expectations.
- Duff A Bow Street Runner who, along with Blathers, investigates the attempted robbery of the Maylie home in Oliver Twist.
- Durdles Drunken stonemason who engraves tombstones for Cloisterham Cathedral. John Jasper is interested in Durdles ability to tap on the tombs and discover their contents. Durdles hires Deputy to throw stones at him when he catches him wandering about drunk at night. "No man is better known in Cloisterham. He is the chartered libertine of the place. Fame trumpets him a wonderful workman - which, for aught that anybody knows, he may be (as he never works); and a wonderful sot - which everybody knows he is." in The Mystery of Edwin Drood.

== E ==
- Endell, Martha A childhood companion of Emily Peggotty.

== F ==
- Fagin is the leader of a group of pickpockets in Oliver Twist
- Fan Scrooge's sister in A Christmas Carol, mother of his nephew Fred. She has died before the story begins but lives again in the 'shadows' shown to Scrooge by the Ghost of Christmas Past. She is based on Dickens' own sister Fanny who died of consumption at age 38.
- Feeder, Mr The assistant to Dr Blimber in Dombey and Son, at the school in Brighton which the younger Paul Dombey attends. Later marries Blimber's daughter Cornelia and takes over the management of the school.
- Fezziwig, Mr hosts a Christmas party that Scrooge visits with the Ghost of Christmas past in A Christmas Carol. Scrooge is reminded of what a kind, generous man 'Old Fezziwig' was. Fezziwig was a very happy man with three daughters. Fezziwig wore a powdered wig and a waistcoat.
- Fielding, May a friend to Mrs Peerybingle, marries Edward Plummer in The Cricket on the Hearth.
- Fielding, Mrs May's mother; a little, peevish, querulous old lady in The Cricket on the Hearth.
- Finching, Flora was the love of Arthur Clennam's youth in Little Dorrit. She is now a garrulous but good-hearted middle-aged woman with a drinking problem.
- Finching's Aunt, not known by any other name than "Mr F.'s Aunt," takes an unaccountable dislike to Arthur Clennam in Little Dorrit.
- Fizkin, Horatio the 'Buff' candidate in the Eatanswill by-election, in The Pickwick Papers.
- Flasher, Wilkins, Esquire is the stock broker who assisted the elder Mr Weller to sell his stock in The Pickwick Papers.
- Flintwinch, Affery servant in the Clennam household and wife of Jeremiah Flintwinch in Little Dorrit.
- Flintwinch, Jeremiah servant in the Clennam household and husband of Affery Flintwinch in Little Dorrit. His brother Ephraim has a very minor role.
- Flite, Miss is the female tenant of Krook's Bottle Shop in Bleak House, obsessive about her case in Chancery, the length and complexity of which has unhinged her.
- Fred the good-hearted nephew of Ebenezer Scrooge, son of his sister Fan in A Christmas Carol.

== G ==
- Gamp, Sarah or Sairey is a nurse in Martin Chuzzlewit.
- Gargery, Biddy see Biddy above
- Gargery, Joe is Pip's "best friend" and care-giver, an illiterate blacksmith who tolerates his wife's abuse in Great Expectations. Pip is raised in the expectation that he will be apprenticed to Joe and take over the family forge.
- Gargery, Mrs Joe is Pip's sister, who at "more than twenty years older" cares for Pip after the death of their parents in Great Expectations. She is a harsh caregiver who is later attacked by Orlick and left bedridden and mute until her death.
- Gargery, Pip young son of Joe and Biddy Gargery at the end of Great Expectations. He is named for Philip Pirrip.
- Garland, Abel Son of Mr and Mrs Garland; he resembles Mr Garland in face and figure. Abel is apprenticed to the notary Mr Witherden in The Old Curiosity Shop.
- Garland, Mr and Mrs Kindly plump couple, parents of Abel, who befriend and hire Kit. They, along with Mr Witherden and the Single Gentleman, are instrumental in clearing Kit of false charges made by Brass in The Old Curiosity Shop.
- Gay, Walter is Sol Gill's nephew, he is employed in the house of Dombey and Son. Walter befriends Florence Dombey, her father is displeased and sends him to the firm's branch in Barbados. The ship in which he sails is lost and Sol goes to search for him. Walter returns and marries Florence. Mr Dombey, after the failure of the house, goes to live with Walter and Florence.
- General, Mrs Traveling companion of the Dorrits in Little Dorrit.
- George, Mr A former soldier, serving under Nemo, who owns a London shooting-gallery in Bleak House. He is a trainer in sword and pistol use, briefly training Richard Carstone. The prime suspect in the death of Mr Tulkinghorn, he is exonerated and his true identity is revealed, against his wishes. He is found to be George Rouncewell, son of the Dedlocks' housekeeper, Mrs Rouncewell, who welcomes him back to Chesney Wold. He ends the book as the body-servant to the stricken Sir Leicester Dedlock.
- Ghost of Christmas Future, The shows Scrooge the demise of Tiny Tim and of himself, leading to Scrooge's reformation in A Christmas Carol.
- Ghost of Christmas Past, The shows Scrooge his lonely and difficult childhood and gradual decline into the miser he will become in A Christmas Carol.
- Ghost of Christmas Present, The shows Scrooge the joy that Christmas brings, both at the poor household of the Cratchits and at the home of his nephew Fred. The ghost also introduces Scrooge to the children, Ignorance and Want in A Christmas Carol.
- Giles, Mr Butler / steward of the Maylie household in Oliver Twist.
- Gowan, Henry Amateur artist in Little Dorrit.
- Gowan, Minnie Daughter of Mr and Mrs Meagles, almost always called Pet in Little Dorrit.
- Gradgrind, Thomas A mill owner retired from business and father of Louisa and Tom. He runs a school and emphasises the importance of facts and figures over fancy to his students and his children. By the end of the story he learns that facts and figures must be tempered by love and forbearance in Hard Times.
- Gradgrind, Tom Son of Thomas. He is employed at Bounderby's bank from whom he later steals, the blame is set on Stephen Blackpool. He later leaves the country with the aid of Sleary and his circus troupe in Hard Times.
- Graham, Mary Cares for old Martin Chuzzlewit, knowing that she will not profit from Martin's wealth after his death. Chuzzlewit's grandson, Martin, falls in love with Mary which displeases his grandfather who disinherits young Martin. Young Martin goes to America to seek his fortune. Finding only sickness and misery in America, Martin returns to England, is reconciled with his grandfather and marries Mary in Martin Chuzzlewit.
- Grainger Friend of Steerforth's who has dinner with David at his chambers at the Adelphi in David Copperfield.
- Granger, Edith Paul Dombey's second wife is the widow of Colonel Granger and the daughter of Mrs Skewton. She marries Dombey but does not love him. She later elopes with Carker, a manager at Dombey's firm, to punish her husband in Dombey and Son.
- Grayper, Mr and Mrs Neighbours of Clara Copperfield in Blunderstone in David Copperfield.
- Grewgious Guardian of Rosa Bud. He is upset at John Jasper's advances to Rosa and finds her lodging in London at an apartment owned by Mrs Billickin. He later investigates the disappearance of Edwin Drood and is suspicious of Jasper. Described as 'an angular man with no conversational powers'. in The Mystery of Edwin Drood.
- Gride, Arthur Old money-lender who develops a scheme, along with fellow usurer, Ralph Nickleby, to get Walter Bray's consent to give his daughter, Madeline's, hand for the forgiveness of debts to Gride and Ralph. Gride's plan is undone when Bray dies on the morning of the wedding and his old housekeeper, Peg Sliderskew, jealous of the young wife, steals documents that reveal his scheme. Gride is murdered by burglars before he can be prosecuted in Nicholas Nickleby.
- Gridley Known as the 'Man from Shropshire' and an involuntary party to a suit in Chancery in Bleak House. He repeatedly seeks to gain the attention of the Lord Chancellor, but in vain. Frustrated, he threatens Mr Tulkinghorn and then is put under arrest by Inspector Bucket. He dies, his health broken by his Chancery ordeal. His story is based on a real case, according to Dickens's preface. The case was that of Thomas Jones Wilkinson who fought for eleven years to try to wrestle control of the John Wilkinson Iron Empire from the bands of John Wilkinson's illegitimate, but recognised heir John Wilkinson (junior).
- Grimwig, Mr Cantankerous friend of Mr Brownlow in Oliver Twist. Quote: "I'll eat my head!"
- Grip Pet raven owned by Barnaby Rudge.
- Grueby, John Loyal servant of Lord George Gordon who tries to isolate Gordon from the rioters when the protest turns to violence in Barnaby Rudge.
- Gulpidge, Mr and Mrs Guests at a dinner party given by the Waterbrooks in David Copperfield.
- Gummidge, Mrs Widow of Mr Peggotty's former partner, who had died very poor. She lives with Mr Peggotty and later emigrates to Australia with him. Quote: 'a lone lorn creetur' and everything went contrary with her' in David Copperfield.
- Guppy, William Clerk for Kenge and Carboy. He proposes marriage to Esther Summerson, which she refuses. Guppy is involved in the investigation of Lady Dedlock's secret in Bleak House, knowing that Krook has a packet of letters somehow connected to her. These pass to Smallweed on Krook's death, but Guppy is still unable to acquire them for Lady Dedlock.

== H ==
- Handford, Julius Name adopted by John Harmon on arrival in London immediately after his supposed drowning in Our Mutual Friend.
- Harmon, John Son of a wealthy dust contractor and heir to his fortune if he agrees to marry Bella Wilfer. He is away from England when his father dies and on the way home he is supposed drowned in a case of mistaken identity. With his supposed death the dust fortune goes to Boffin. John gets himself hired into the Boffin home as secretary John Rokesmith. Here he meets Bella and, with the help of the Boffins, wins her love as Rokesmith, and marries her. He later reveals his true identity and regains his fortune in Our Mutual Friend.
- Harris, Mrs Imaginary friend of Sairey Gamp who uses Mrs Harris's invented quotes to establish Mrs Gamp's good reputation in Martin Chuzzlewit.
- Harthouse, James A Parliamentary candidate visiting Coketown, he befriends Tom Gradgrind in an attempt to seduce his sister, Louisa, who is in an unhappy marriage to Bounderby. As a result of the attempted seduction Louisa runs home to her father and refuses to return to Bounderby and is later disowned by him in Hard Times.
- Havisham, Estella is adopted by Miss Havisham in Great Expectations. Pip falls in love with her, she spurns him, but after several years they meet and vow to remain together.
- Havisham, Arthur Miss Havisham's drunken brother who plots with Compeyson to gain his sister's fortune in Great Expectations.
- Havisham, Miss is the reclusive guardian of Estella at Satis House. Her heart was broken in her youth by the conman Compeyson, who broke off their engagement on the day of their wedding. Miss Havisham teaches Estella to deny any emotions which could leave her vulnerable to heartbreak and uses Pip for Estella to practice on. Pip mistakenly believes Miss Havisham intends him for Estella and is his secret benefactor as he goes to London and becomes a gentleman, finding out later that the convict Magwitch has supplied his 'expectations'. Miss Havisham dies when her house burns down and leaves her fortune to Estella in Great Expectations.
- Hawdon, Captain James see Nemo.
- Hawk, Sir Mulberry is a lecherous, parasitic nobleman in Nicholas Nickleby.
- Heep, Mrs Widowed mother of Uriah Heep in David Copperfield, "dead image of Uriah, only short". She is as "'umble" as her son, whom she dotes on.
- Heep, Uriah A hypocritical clerk of Mr Wickfield's who is continually citing his humility. He deviously plots to ruin Wickfield but is later undone by Mr Micawber. On their first meeting, David describes him as "a red-haired person – a youth of fifteen, as I take it now, but looking much older – whose hair was cropped as close as the closest stubble; who had hardly any eyebrows, and no eyelashes, and eyes of a red-brown, so unsheltered and unshaded, that I remember wondering how he went to sleep. He was high-shouldered and bony; dressed in decent black, with a white wisp of a neckcloth; buttoned up to the throat; and had a long, lank, skeleton hand, which particularly attracted my attention, as he stood at the pony's head, rubbing his chin with it, and looking up at us in the chaise. He had a way of writhing when he wanted to express enthusiasm, which was very ugly" Uriah Heep, wonderfully hideous, is one of Dickens' greatest triumphs in character creation. His description of Heep's writhing and scheming, and his cold, clammy nature, makes one's skin crawl in David Copperfield.
- Hexam, Charlie Son of Gaffer and brother to Lizzie. Charlie is educated by Bradley Headstone and supports Headstone's advances toward his sister. When Lizzie refuses to marry Headstone Charlie rejects her in Our Mutual Friend.
- Hexam, Gaffer Waterman, father of Lizzie and Charlie, who plies the Thames looking for dead bodies. He finds a body thought to be John Harmon, the central character in the story in Our Mutual Friend.
- Hexam, Lizzie Daughter of waterman Gaffer Hexam and sister of Charlie. She is opposed to her father's business of combing the Thames looking for drowned bodies but is true to him. When her father drowns she goes to live with Jenny Wren. Lizzie rejects the advances of schoolmaster Bradley Headstone and opposes the attention of Eugene Wrayburn, although she loves him, because they come from different classes of society. She runs away from London to a mill up the river. Wrayburn succeeds in finding her and is followed by Headstone who attempts to murder Wrayburn. Lizzie rescues Wrayburn and later marries him in Our Mutual Friend.
- Higden, Betty Old woman who operates a 'minding school', for orphans and other children. She is adamant about earning her keep and staying away from the work-house. When an orphan in her keep dies she hits the road and earns a living doing needlework. She dies in the arms of Lizzie Hexam who promises not to take her to the work-house. Dickens uses the character to illustrate the horror many of the truly needy had of the work-house system in Our Mutual Friend.
- Hominy, Mrs Conceited American literary lady Martin is forced to accompany on the first leg of the trip to Eden in Martin Chuzzlewit.
- Honeythunder, Luke Loud, overbearing philanthropist and guardian of Neville and Helena Landless in The Mystery of Edwin Drood.
- Hortense Lady Dedlock's French maid in Bleak House. She is dismissed in favour of Rosa and aids lawyer Tulkinghorn in discovering Lady Dedlock's secret. When Tulkinghorn spurns her, she murders him. Hortense is based on Mrs Manning, a murderer whose execution Dickens witnessed in 1849.
- Hubble, Mr and Mrs are friends of the Gargerys in Great Expectations. Mr Hubble is the village wheelwright. "I remember Mrs Hubble as a little curly sharp-edged person in sky-blue, who held a conveniently juvenile position, because she had married Mr Hubble--I don't know at what remote period--when she was much younger than he. I remember Mr Hubble as a tough, high-shouldered stooping old man, of a sawdusty fragrance, with his legs extraordinarily wide apart; so that in my short days I always saw some miles of open country between them when I met him coming up the lane."
- Hugh The hostler at the Maypole Inn. Joins the rioters in London and is later hanged. Revealed to be the son of Sir John Chester in Barnaby Rudge
- Humphrey, Master The narrator in Master Humphrey's Clock and at the start of The Old Curiosity Shop
- Hunter, Leo, Mr and Mrs Mrs Hunter organised a fancy-dress garden party for literary people in The Pickwick Papers. She graced the assembled company with a reading of her own poem, The Expiring Frog. Mr Hunter is a docile character, wholly under his wife's influence.
- Hutley, Jem alias "Dismal Jemmy", is a friend of Alfred Jingle in The Pickwick Papers. He is a shabbily dressed man who makes depressing observations, and then tells the Pickwickians The Stroller's Tale, a story of a man dying in great poverty.

== J ==
- Jaggers, Mr is the secretive lawyer who mediates between Pip and his mysterious benefactor in Great Expectations. He is responsible for Abel Magwitch's wife Molly's acquittal of murder charges and oversees the placement of their daughter Estella in Satis House under Miss Havisham's care, unbeknown to Abel.
- Janet Betsy Trotwood's maid. "a pretty blooming girl of about nineteen or twenty". She later marries a tavern keeper in David Copperfield.
- Jarndyce, John An unwilling party in Jarndyce and Jarndyce, guardian of Richard Carstone, Ada Clare, and Esther Summerson; owner of Bleak House in the novel of that name. Vladimir Nabokov called him "the best and kindest man ever to appear in a novel". A wealthy man, he helps most of the other characters out of a mix of disinterested goodness and guilt at the mischief and human misery caused by Jarndyce and Jarndyce, which he calls "the family curse". He falls in love with Esther and wishes to marry her, but gives her up because she is in love with Dr Woodcourt.
- Jasper, John Uncle of Edwin Drood who has an opium habit. He cares for his nephew but harbours secret feelings for Edwin's fiancée Rosa Bud. Edwin disappears and the story ends prematurely with Dickens death but many believe that it was Jasper who killed Edwin Drood. Dickens describes Jasper as "a dark man of some six-and-twenty, with thick, lustrous, well-arranged black hair and whiskers. He looks older than he is, as dark men often do. His voice is deep and good, his face and figure are good, his manner is a little sombre. His room is a little sombre, and may have had its influence in forming his manner." in The Mystery of Edwin Drood.
- Jeddler, Dr Anthony Country doctor whose view of life is altered by the sacrifices made by his youngest daughter, Marion, for her sister, Grace in The Battle of Life.
- Jeddler, Grace Older daughter of Dr Jeddler. She is the recipient of the sacrifice of her younger sister Marion, who runs away that Grace may marry her beau Alfred Heathfield in The Battle of Life.
- Jeddler, Marion Younger daughter of Dr Jeddler. She runs away to live with her Aunt Martha that her sister Grace may marry Alfred Heathfield in The Battle of Life.
- Jeddler, Martha Maiden sister of Dr Jeddler. The doctor's younger daughter, Marion, runs away and secretly lives with Martha in The Battle of Life.
- Jellyby, Mr is the indebted husband of Mrs Jellyby in Bleak House.
- Jellyby, Caroline (Caddy) is the miserable daughter of Mrs Jellyby in Bleak House, who eventually finds happiness with Prince Turveydrop.
- Jellyby, Mrs is an Africa-obsessed woman who takes in the protagonist and her two friends in Bleak House. She neglects her own family whilst relentlessly pursuing her misguided charitable efforts.
- Jemmy, "Dismal" see Hutley, Jem.
- Jenny Brickmaker's wife, befriended by Esther Summerson after Jenny's child dies. Later exchanges coats with Lady Dedlock, throwing Bucket off in his pursuit of Lady Dedlock as she flees following the revealing of her secret in Bleak House.
- Jingle, Alfred is a garrulous strolling player and mountebank in The Pickwick Papers.
- Jo is a crossing sweeper who finds solace in the generosity of Captain Hawdon in Bleak House.
- Joe The fat boy in The Pickwick Papers who eats great amounts and can fall asleep at any time.
- Jorkins, Mr is the unseen partner of Mr Spenlow, who blames Jorkins for any unwelcome decisions, in David Copperfield.

== K ==
- Kedgick, Captain Landlord of the National Hotel where Mark and Martin stay on their way to and from Eden in Martin Chuzzlewit.
- Kenge a Solicitor for John Jarndyce in the firm Kenge and Carboy. Known as 'Conversation Kenge' in Bleak House.
- Kenwigs Neighbours of Newman Noggs. Nicholas tutors their three daughters. Mrs Kenwigs' uncle, Mr Lillyvick, is a well-to-do collector of water rates and the family hopes to eventually profit from this relation. Their expectations are dashed when Lillyvick marries actress Henrietta Petowker and are revived when she runs away with a retired navy captain in Nicholas Nickleby.
- Kidgerbury, Mrs the Maid (at intervals) to David and Dora Copperfield, and the "oldest inhabitant of Kentish Town." in David Copperfield
- Krook is an alcoholic who runs a rag and bottle shop and lodging house in Bleak House. His tenants include Nemo and Miss Flite. He dies when he spontaneously combusts.

== L ==
- La Creevy, Miss Miniature painter in the Strand. The Nickleby's lease lodging from her briefly and she becomes their faithful friend. In the end she marries the Cheeryble Brothers old clerk, Tim Linkinwater in Nicholas Nickleby.
- Lammle, Alfred and Sophronia Society couple who marry, each thinking that the other has money only to find after marriage that both are broke. They are frustrated in a scheme to worm their way into the Boffin fortune and leave England to escape debts in Our Mutual Friend.
- Landless, Helena Twin sister of Neville who, as the story ends prematurely, is falling in love with Canon Chrisparkle in The Mystery of Edwin Drood.
- Landless, Neville Twin brother of Helena. He and his sister are brought to Cloisterham by their guardian, Mr Honeythunder. Neville is attracted to Rosa Bud and, being set up by Jasper, quarrels with Edwin Drood. After Drood's disappearance Jasper cast blame on Neville who has no alibi and flees to London with his sister in The Mystery of Edwin Drood.
- Langdale, Mr Kindly vintner and distiller in Holborn based on an historical figure. The Catholic Langdale shelters Geoffrey Haredale from the rioters. His home and warehouse are burned in the riots, his stores of spirits are consumed by the mob in Barnaby Rudge.
- Larkins, Miss Early love of David Copperfield, "a tall, dark, black-eyed, fine figure of a woman." She later marries an officer in the Army in David Copperfield.
- Leeford, Edward (alias Monks) Villainous son of Edwin and half-brother of Oliver Twist who plots with Fagin to corrupt Oliver, in which case Leeford will inherit all of their father's property. After the plan is foiled Leeford is forced to emigrate to America where he dies in prison in Oliver Twist.
- Leeford, Edwin Father of Oliver, whom he has fathered out of wedlock with Agnes Fleming. Also father of Edward (Monks) from a previous marriage. Edwin has died before the story begins in Oliver Twist.
- Lenville, Thomas Member of Crummles' traveling stage troupe: "a dark-complexioned man, inclining indeed to sallow, with long thick black hair, and very evident inclinations (although he was close shaved) of a stiff beard, and whiskers of the same deep shade. His age did not appear to exceed thirty, though many at first sight would have considered him much older, as his face was long, and very pale, from the constant application of stage paint." in Nicholas Nickleby.
- Lewsome Medical man and old schoolmate of John Westlock. Westlock hires Mrs Gamp to nurse Lewsome through a serious illness. Lewsome has provided poison to Jonas Chuzzlewit who intends using it to kill his father, Anthony. His later confession helps lead to Jonas' arrest in Martin Chuzzlewit.
- Lightwood, Mortimer A lawyer too lazy to take on much work and friend of Eugene Wrayburn. His only client is the Boffins, which puts him in the middle of much of the story in Our Mutual Friend.
- Lilian Orphaned nine-year-old niece of Will Fern in The Chimes.
- Lillyvick, Mr Collector of water rates and uncle of Mrs Kenwigs. He secretly marries Henrietta Petowker in Portsmouth, much to the dismay of the Kenwigs, who had hoped to inherit his money. The Kenwigs expectations are renewed when Henrietta runs off with a half-pay (retired) captain in Nicholas Nickleby.
- Linkinwater, Tim Faithful clerk to the Cheeryble Brothers and friend of the Nicklebys. He marries Miss La Creevy in Nicholas Nickleby.
- Littimer Manservant to Steerforth, involved in the concealment of the elopement of Steerforth and Emily. He is later guilty of embezzlement and is captured with the help of Miss Mowcher. David says of him "I believe there never existed in his station a more respectable-looking man. He was taciturn, soft-footed, very quiet in his manner, deferential, observant, always at hand when wanted, and never near when not wanted; but his great claim to consideration was his respectability." in David Copperfield.
- Longford, Edmund Ailing student at the university where Redlaw teaches chemistry. He is adversely effected by Redlaw's gift of forgetting past sorrows and is later restored by his old nurse, Milly Swidger in The Haunted Man.
- Lorry, Jarvis A clerk in Tellson's bank who is instrumental in bringing Dr Manette, who is imprisoned in Paris, back to England. He returns to Paris to look after the bank's interest after the Revolution starts and while there helps Lucie and Charles Darnay, bringing them back to England after Sydney Carton sacrifices his life to save Darnay in A Tale of Two Cities.
- Losberne, Dr Impetuous doctor who treats Oliver and Rose in illness. A friend of the Maylie family in Oliver Twist.
- Lowten Clerk to the solicitor Perker. Spends evenings with other law clerks at the 'Magpie and Stump' tavern in Pickwick Papers.
- Lupin, Mrs Landlady of the Blue Dragon Inn. Eventually marries Mark Tapley in Martin Chuzzlewit.

== M ==
- Maggy feeble-minded friend of Amy Dorrit in Little Dorrit.
- Magnus, Peter is a nervous and jealous man whom Mr Pickwick meets on the coach to Ipswitch in The Pickwick Papers. Magnus is on the way to propose to Miss Witherfield, but Pickwick causes a falling-out between the two after a misunderstanding involving Pickwick blundering into the wrong room in the inn where they are staying.
- Magwitch, Abel (Provis) is Pip's unlikely benefactor in Great Expectations. A lifelong criminal, he grew up alone on the street stealing to survive. He fell into Compeyson's company and assisted him in committing forgeries. Sentenced harshly because of his background and lack of education, he escapes his prison ship and attempts to murder Compeyson. He is shipped off to Australia under penalty of death should he return to England, and makes a fortune in sheep ranching, bestowing it on the only person to ever show him kindness. He is Estella's father, but was told his beloved child was murdered by Molly, and does not know she lives.
- Manette, Dr Alexandre is the father of Lucie Manette in A Tale of Two Cities, and a former prisoner in the Bastille.
- Manette, Lucie is the daughter of Dr Alexandre Manette in A Tale of Two Cities.
- Mann, Mrs is a woman in Oliver Twist who raises infant orphans on the parish farm. She is not the most motherly of women (hence her surname) and she maltreats the orphans with corporal punishment and starvation.
- Mantalini, Mr and Madame: Milliners, Kate's employers in Nicholas Nickleby.
- Marley, Jacob is the former business partner of Ebenezer Scrooge, Marley visits Scrooge as a ghost in A Christmas Carol.
- Marton, Mr Kindly schoolmaster who befriends Nell and her grandfather. He meets up with them again at the end of their journey and obtains a situation for them in the village church where he has been appointed clerk in The Old Curiosity Shop.
- Mary Pretty housemaid of Nupkins, the Mayor and principal magistrate of Ipswich, whom Samuel Weller pursues throughout The Pickwick Papers. Later Arabella Allen's maid, and then hired as housemaid by Samuel Pickwick. She marries Sam Weller at the end of the novel.
- Mary Anne Incompetent maid to David and Dora Copperfield in David Copperfield.
- Maylie, Harry Son of Mrs Maylie, he marries Rose in Oliver Twist.
- Maylie, Mrs Mother of Harry and the adopted mother of Rose in Oliver Twist.
- Maylie, Rose A poor girl adopted by Mrs Maylie, she and Mr Brownlow endeavour to help Oliver through Nancy. When Nancy's conversation with Rose on London Bridge is overheard by Claypole, Nancy is murdered by Sikes. She later marries Harry in Oliver Twist.
- M'Choakumchild, Mr, a schoolteacher in Hard Times characterised as being typical of professional schoolmasters - so focused on facts as to extinguish imagination. "He and some one hundred and forty other schoolmasters, had been lately turned at the same time, in the same factory, on the same principles, like so many pianoforte legs...If he had only learnt a little less, how infinitely better he might have taught much more!"
- Meagles, Mr and Mrs Parents of Pet in Little Dorrit. Quote: "We are practical people."
- Melia, maidservant at Dr Blimber's school, who helped little Paul Dombey to dress, then rubbed his hands to warm them, gave him a kiss and told him "whenever he wanted anything of that sort - meaning in the dressing way - to ask for Melia".
- Merdle, Mr and Mrs Mr Merdle is an unscrupulous banker in Little Dorrit. His enterprises lead to the ruin of the Dorrits and he commits suicide when his fraud is uncovered.
- Micawber, Wilkins exposes the deeds of Uriah Heep in David Copperfield.
- Molly is Mr Jaggers' mysterious housekeeper. Molly is the former mistress of Abel Magwitch. They both turn out to be Estella's parents at the end of Great Expectations.
- "Monks" See Leeford, Edward.
- Murdstone, Edward is the second husband of David Copperfield's mother, Clara.

== N ==
- Nancy is a prostitute and a friend of Oliver in Oliver Twist. She is eventually murdered by Bill Sikes, her lover.
- Native, The Indian servant of Major Joe Bagstock in Dombey and Son.
- Neckett Sheriff's officer who arrests debtors and delivers them to Coavin's sponging house (temporary debtors' prison) thus Skimpole gives Neckett the nickname "Coavinses". Neckett dies leaving three orphans: Charlotte (Charley), Emma, and Tom. Charley becomes Esther Summerson's maid in Bleak House.
- Neckett, Charlotte (alias Charley) Daughter of sheriff's officer Neckett in Bleak House. When her father dies Charley cares for her two younger siblings: Emma and Tom. Charley becomes Esther Summerson's maid, nursing Esther through smallpox. She later marries a miller.
- Nemo (Latin for 'nobody') is the alias of Captain James Hawdon in Bleak House. Nemo copies legal documents for Snagsby and lodges at Krook's rag and bottle shop, eventually dying of an opium overdose. He is later found to be the former lover of Lady Dedlock and the father of Esther Summerson.
- Nickleby, Kate is the handsome, forthright sister of Nicholas in Nicholas Nickleby.
- Nickleby, Mrs, mother of Nicholas and Kate Nickleby, is quite possibly the most obtuse character in the Dickens oeuvre. For all her judgments, surmises, and assessments, she appraises correctly not a single thing in all of 65 chapters in Nicholas Nickleby.
- Nickleby, Nicholas is the eponymous protagonist of Nicholas Nickleby, who is thrown into poverty upon the death of his father, and must support his mother and sister.
- Nickleby, Ralph is the uncle and antagonist of Nicholas in Nicholas Nickleby.
- Nipper, Susan Florence Dombey's maid who is discharged when she confronts Paul Dombey about his treatment of Florence. She later marries Toots. Dickens describes Susan as "a short, brown womanly girl, with a little snub nose, and black eyes like jet beads." in Dombey and Son
- Noggs, Newman Once a well-to-do gentleman but he squanders his money and is reduced to serving Ralph Nickleby as clerk. He befriends Nicholas and eventually helps him defeat the designs of Ralph in Nicholas Nickleby.
- Norris family, The New York friends of Mr Bevan whom he introduces to Martin in Martin Chuzzlewit. Their initial warm welcome cools when they discover he made the trip to America in steerage.
- Nubbles, Kit Shop boy at the Curiosity Shop owned by Nell's grandfather and is devoted to Nell. Kit lives at home with his widowed mother, his brother Jacob, and baby brother. Kit is later hired by the Garlands and is wrongly charged with theft by Brass. At the end of the novel we find Kit has married Barbara in The Old Curiosity Shop.
- Nupkins, Mr Mr Nupkins is the Mayor and principal magistrate of Ipswitch, before whom Mr Pickwick is hauled on suspicion of intent to fight a duel with Peter Magnus, in The Pickwick Papers.

== O ==
- Old Sally is the nurse in Oliver Twist who nurses Oliver's mother on her deathbed.
- Omer, Mr is an undertaker in Yarmouth in David Copperfield.
- Orlick, Dolge is Joe Gargery's journeyman blacksmith, and the main antagonist of Great Expectations. He quarrels with Mrs Joe and later attacks her, leaving her with injuries of which she later dies. He falls in with Compeyson and eventually tries to murder Pip, and is eventually arrested and jailed after robbing Pumblechook.

== P ==
- Pancks, Mr Rental agent for Mr Casby in Little Dorrit.
- Pardiggle, Alfred is Mrs Pardiggle's youngest son who is forced to participate in all her causes in Bleak House.
- Pardiggle, Egbert is Mrs Pardiggle's oldest son who is forced to participate in all her causes in Bleak House.
- Pardiggle, Felix is Mrs Pardiggle's fourth son who is forced to participate in all her causes in Bleak House.
- Pardiggle, Francis is Mrs Pardiggle's third son who is forced to participate in all her causes in Bleak House.
- Pardiggle, Mrs is a woman who does "good works" for the poor, but cannot see that her efforts are rude and arrogant, and do nothing at all to help. She inflicts her activities on her five small sons, who are clearly rebellious, and is always asking Mr Jarndyce for donations in Bleak House.
- Pardiggle, Oswald is Mrs Pardiggle's second son who is forced to participate in all her causes in Bleak House.
- Pawkins, Major and Mrs Proprietors of a New York boarding house where Martin and Mark stay. The Major is typical of the scoundrels they meet in America in Martin Chuzzlewit.
- Payne, Dr is the second to Dr Slammer, who finds Mr Winkle and issues Slammer's challenge to a duel in The Pickwick Papers. Payne is keen on duelling, and is unhappy when the duel is called off, trying to get the two principals to duel over something else, and finally offering to duel with Mr Snodgrass, Winkle's second. Mr Snodgrass declines the offer.
- Pecksniff, Charity (Cherry) Seth Pecksniff's older daughter and sister of Mercy in Martin Chuzzlewit. Haughty and ill-tempered, without her younger sister's playful nature. She is infuriated when passed over for marriage by Jonas Chuzzlewit who chooses her sister. She later promises herself to Mr Moddle, who leaves her at the altar. Charity has a disposition "which was then observed to be of a sharp and acid quality, as though an extra lemon (figuratively speaking) had been squeezed into the nectar of her disposition, and had rather damaged its flavour."
- Pecksniff, Mercy (Merry) Seth Pecksniff's younger daughter and sister of Charity. Seth gives her in marriage to Jonas Chuzzlewit, who breaks her spirit, and her heart in Martin Chuzzlewit.
- Pecksniff, Seth Sanctimonious surveyor and architect "who has never designed or built anything", and one of the biggest hypocrites in fiction. Father of daughters Mercy and Charity. In an effort to gain old Martin's money he embraces then throws out young Martin at old Martin's wish. When long time servant Tom Pinch learns of Pecksniff's treachery he is also thrown out. Pecksniff's self-serving designs are eventually exposed by Old Martin who reconciles with his grandson, young Martin, in Martin Chuzzlewit.
- Peerybingle, John a carrier; a lumbering, slow, honest man in The Cricket on the Hearth.
- Peerybingle, Mary ("Dot"), John Peerybingle's wife in The Cricket on the Hearth.
- Peggotty, Clara David's devoted nurse and sister to Daniel Peggotty. After the death of David's mother she is discharged and marries Barkis. When Barkis dies she goes to live with David and Betsy Trotwood. David comically describes getting a hug from Peggotty: "She laid aside her work (which was a stocking of her own), and opening her arms wide, took my curly head within them, and gave it a good squeeze. I know it was a good squeeze, because, being very plump, whenever she made any little exertion after she was dressed, some of the buttons on the back of her gown flew off. And I recollect two bursting to the opposite side of the parlour, while she was hugging me." in David Copperfield.
- Peggotty, Daniel Crotchety fisherman and dealer in lobsters, crabs, and crawfish. Brother of Clara. He lives in a converted boat on the beach at Yarmouth with Emily, Ham, and Mrs Gummidge. When Emily abandons them to elope with Steerforth, Daniel vows to find her. Steerforth later leaves Emily and she is re-united with Daniel. Daniel, Emily, and Mrs Gummidge resettle in Australia in David Copperfield.
- Peggotty, Emily The orphaned niece of Clara and Daniel Peggotty and fiancée of Ham Peggotty.
- Peggotty, Ham Fisherman and boatbuilder in David Copperfield. Orphaned nephew of Daniel Peggotty and fiancé of Emily. He drowns trying to rescue Steerforth.
- Perker, Mr is a lawyer in The Pickwick Papers. He represents Pickwick in the case brought against him by Mrs Bardell, and also gives advice concerning Rachael Wardle's elopement. He is election agent to Samuel Slumkey in the Eatanswill by-election.
- Phenomenon, The, A.K.A. The Infant Phenomenon is Miss Ninetta Crummles, daughter of Mr and Mrs Vincent Crummles, in Nicholas Nickleby.
- Pickwick, Samuel Retired businessman; he is the protagonist, founder, and chairman of the Pickwick Club. Pickwick, along with his friends Tupman, Snodgrass, Winkle, and his servant Sam Weller, travel around England in search of adventure in The Pickwick Papers. Pickwick is one of Dickens' most beloved characters and his story propelled Dickens to literary stardom.
- Pinch, Tom is Seth Pecksniff's assistant in Martin Chuzzlewit.
- Pip (Philip Pirrip) is the protagonist of Great Expectations. Raised in humble circumstances by his abusive sister and her kind-hearted husband Joe, Pip is exposed to the high-class, disdainful beauty Estella at Satis House. Once content to be a blacksmith like Joe, Pip finds himself ashamed of his poverty and lack of education. When an anonymous benefactor deeds him a fortune, Pip turns his back on his family and friends to become a new man in London. When he learns the identity of his benefactor, his plans are ruined.
- Pirrip, The late Alexander, Bartholomew, Abraham, Tobias and Roger are Pip's deceased brothers in Great Expectations, "...[w]ho gave up trying to get a living exceedingly early in that universal struggle..."
- Pirrip, The late Philip and Georgiana are Pip and Mrs Joe Gargery's deceased parents in Great Expectations.
- Plornish, Mr and Mrs Tenants of Bleeding Heart Yard (once identified as T. and M. Plornish) in Little Dorrit.
- Plummer, Bertha blind daughter of the toymaker, Caleb Plummer. From one of Dickens lesser known books, The Cricket on the Hearth.
- Plummer, Caleb is Mr Tackleton's underpaid toy maker in The Cricket on the Hearth.
- Plummer, Edward the son of Caleb Plummer in The Cricket on the Hearth.
- Pocket, Belinda always has her nose in a book of titles. Her father was a Knight "who had invented for himself a conviction that his deceased father would have been made a Baronet but for somebody's determined opposition arising out of entirely personal motives." He set out to bring up Belinda to be the wife of a titled man: "she had grown up highly ornamental, but perfectly helpless and useless." Mrs Pocket relies on her maids Flopson and Millers to care for her children, whom she usually manages to trip. Great Expectations
- Pocket, Herbert the pale young man who fought Pip at Satis House, and becomes his roommate and close friend in London in Great Expectations.
- Pocket, Matthew Matthew Pocket is Miss Havisham's cousin, who warned her that Compeyson was using her for her money, and then fell out of her favor. He is Belinda's husband and Herbert's father. He is considered a disappointment for not gaining a title. He takes on the education of Pip along with Bentley Drummle and Startop in Great Expectations.
- Podsnap Georgiana In Our Mutual Friend
- Pott, Mr and Mrs Mr Pott is the editor of the Eatanswill Gazette, a local newspaper in The Pickwick Papers. His public persona is that of a fearless political journalist, but at home he is bullied by Mrs Pott, who makes no secret of the fact that she finds local politics insufferably boring. The Pickwickians have to leave the Pott household after Mr Winkle and Mrs Pott flirt mildly, provoking a scurrilous article in Pott's rival paper, the Eatanswill Independent.
- Pross, Miss devoted servant of Lucie Manette in A Tale of Two Cities.
- Pumblechook, Mr is Joe Gargery's uncle, ("but Mrs Joe appropriated him") in Great Expectations. Conceited and utterly materialistic, he is a"well-to-do corn-chandler in the nearest town, [with] his own chaise-cart." He takes Pip on his first meeting with Miss Havisham and gives himself all the credit for arranging Pip's change in fortune. He is later attacked and robbed by Orlick, but ensures his assailant's arrest by naming him to the police. "[A] large hard-breathing middle-aged slow man, with a mouth like a fish, dull staring eyes, and sandy hair standing upright on his head, so that he looked as if he had just been all but choked, and at that moment had come to..."

== Q ==
- Quilp, Betsy The pretty and timid wife of Daniel Quilp whom he loves to mentally torture. When Quilp dies she inherits his money and happily remarries. Betsy's mother is Mrs Jiniwin in The Old Curiosity Shop.
- Quilp, Daniel An evil dwarf in The Old Curiosity Shop, who lends money to Nell's grandfather (who gambles it away and flees). Quilp attempts to find Nell and her grandfather as they travel through the country. Later Quilp is pursued by the police and, lost in the fog, drowns in the Thames.
- Quinion, Mr The Manager of Grimby and Murdstone's wine-bottling warehouse who employs David Copperfield in David Copperfield

== R ==
- Radfoot, George The third mate aboard the ship bringing John Harmon back to England. He and Harmon resemble each other and Harmon devises a plan to temporarily exchange clothes and identities with Radfoot so that he can secretly observe his intended bride, Bella Wilfer. Radfoot instead drugs and robs Harmon and is then murdered himself, his body taken for that of John Harmon in Our Mutual Friend
- Redlaw, Professor A professor of chemistry who is visited by a phantom on Christmas Eve and given the gift of forgetting painful memories. The gift turns out to be a curse as it is passed on to those Redlaw touches. The adverse effects of the gift are finally reversed by Milly Swidger in The Haunted Man.
- Riderhood, Pleasant Daughter of Rogue Riderhood. Pleasant is an unlicensed pawnbroker, she later overcomes her dislike of Mr Venus's occupation and agrees to marry him in Our Mutual Friend.
- Riderhood, Rogue Waterman and former partner of Gaffer Hexam who tries to pin blame on Gaffer for the Harmon murder to gain a reward. Riderhood later becomes a lock-keeper and tries to blackmail Bradley Headstone after Bradley tries to murder Eugene Wrayburn. In a quarrel both Riderhood and Headstone drown in the Thames. Rogue is also the father of Pleasant Riderhood in Our Mutual Friend .
- Rigaud, Monsieur, also goes by the names Blandois and Lagnier. Villain of Little Dorrit. Rigaud attempts to blackmail Mrs Clennam and has her house fall on him for his efforts. "When Monsieur Rigaud laughed, a change took place in his face, that was more remarkable than prepossessing. His moustache went up under his nose, and his nose came down over his moustache, in a very sinister and cruel manner."
- Rokesmith, John Alias used by John Harmon when he is employed as secretary to the Boffins in Our Mutual Friend.
- Rouncewell, George see George, Mr.
- Rouncewell, Mrs Housekeeper to the Dedlocks in Bleak House. Mother of Richard and George Rouncewell.
- Rouncewell, Richard A prosperous ironmaster and son of Mrs Rouncewell in Bleak House.
- Rouncewell, Watt Richard Rouncewell's son, in Bleak House.
- Rosa Favourite lady's maid to Lady Dedlock in Bleak House. She and Watt Rouncewell are in love, and Richard Rouncewell tries to buy her out of the Dedlock's service so that she may be educated and the pair may marry.
- Rudge, Barnaby A simple but good hearted boy who unwittingly gets involved in the Gordon Riots when he falls into bad company. He is later arrested and sentenced to death but gains reprieve through the help of Gabriel Varden in Barnaby Rudge.
- Rudge, Barnaby Sr the father of Barnaby and husband of Mary. He was the Steward at the Warren and murdered his employer, Reuben Haredale. He went into hiding after the murder and resurfaces years later trying to extort money from his wife. He is finally captured by Geoffrey Haredale and executed at Newgate in Barnaby Rudge.
- Rugg, Mr the Landlord of Pancks who assists in finding William Dorrit's fortune in Little Dorrit. His daughter, Miss Rugg, is also a character.

== S ==
- Scrooge, Ebenezer Miserly main character in A Christmas Carol, he is visited by the ghost of Jacob Marley and three ghosts of Christmas.
- Sikes, Bill is a villain and a thief in Oliver Twist.
- Skimpole, Harold is the indebted and foolish friend of John Jarndyce in Bleak House. His character is based on the critic and essayist Leigh Hunt.
- Sleary, Mr. in Hard Times.
- Slammer, Dr is a surgeon with the 97th Regiment in The Pickwick Papers. He is slighted by Mr Jingle at a ball, and Winkle almost fights a duel with him, because Jingle had borrowed Winkle's coat and Slammer's second delivers the challenge to the owner of the distinctive coat.
- Slowboy, Tilly a great clumsy girl; Mrs Peerybingle's nursemaid in The Cricket on the Hearth.
- Slumkey, Samuel the 'Blue' candidate in the Eatanswill by-election, in The Pickwick Papers. Pickwick's friend and lawyer, Mr Perker, is his election agent.
- Slyme, Chevy a character in Martin Chuzzlewit.
- Smallweed, Mr A moneylender in Bleak House. An evil man who enjoys inflicting emotional pain on other people. He drives Mr George into bankruptcy by calling in debts. Mr Tulkinghorn is his attorney in that case. It has been suggested that his description (together with his grandchildren) fit that of a person with progeria.
- Smike is the damaged, sickly young man who escapes with Nicholas from the squalid Dotheboys Hall and its sadistic master, Wackford Squeers, in Nicholas Nickleby.
- Snagsby, Mr The timid proprietor of a law-stationery business who gets involved with Tulkinghorn's and Bucket's secrets, in Bleak House. He is Jo's only friend. He tends to give half-crowns to those whom he feels sorry for. He is married to Mrs Snagsby, who has a strong personality and suspects Mr Snagsby of many secrets, for example she (incorrectly) believes that Jo the crossing sweeper is his son.
- Snodgrass, Augustus is a member of the Pickwick Club and a travelling companion of Mr Pickwick in the Pickwick Papers. He has a poetic nature, but has apparently not written any verse himself.
- Sowerberry, Mr is the undertaker to whom Oliver is sold by Mr Bumble in the novel Oliver Twist.
- Sowerberry, Mrs is the wife of Mr Sowerberry, and mother of Charlotte in the novel Oliver Twist.
- Sparkler, Edmund Son of Mrs Merdle by a previous marriage, marries Fanny Dorrit in Little Dorrit.
- Spenlow, Dora is the first wife of David Copperfield in David Copperfield.
- Spottletoe, Mr and Mrs Close relatives of old Martin Chuzzlewit's (Mrs is old Martin's niece) with designs on inheriting his money in Martin Chuzzlewit.
- Squeers, Fanny Daughter of Wackford Squeers. Described as "not tall like her mother, but short like her father; from the former she inherited a voice of harsh quality; from the latter a remarkable expression of the right eye, something akin to having none at all." When Nicholas Nickleby becomes her father's assistant she falls madly in love with him, telling her friend Matilda Price that they are practically engaged. Nicholas wants nothing to do with her in Nicholas Nickleby.
- Squeers, Mrs Wife of Wackford Squeers: "a large raw-boned figure, was about half a head taller than Mr Squeers." While Mr Squeers attempts to keep his cruelty in check, in order to keep up appearances, Mrs Squeers is openly cruel in Nicholas Nickleby.
- Squeers, Wackford Proprietor of Dotheboys Hall, he takes in boys not wanted by their families and mistreats them. Nicholas Nickleby becomes his assistant master and sees the way he treats his charges, gives him a sound thrashing, and leaves. Squeers seeks revenge and conspires with Ralph Nickleby. He is eventually undone, imprisoned, and transported in Nicholas Nickleby.
- Squeers, Wackford Jr Son of schoolmaster Wackford Squeers. Little Wackford is kept fat as an advertisement of the supposed plenty provided at the school. He is spoiled by being given any gifts intended for pupils of the school by their families in Nicholas Nickleby.
- Squod, Phil Mr George's ugly little assistant at the shooting gallery in Bleak House. Formerly a travelling tinker.
- St. Evrémonde, Marquis A French aristocrat in A Tale of Two Cities
- Stagg Blind member of the 'Prentice Knights with Simon Tappertit. He joins Barnaby Rudge Sr in trying to extort money from Mary Rudge. Killed when he tries to run from officers arresting Hugh, Barnaby, and Rudge Sr in Barnaby Rudge.
- Steerforth, James is a childhood friend of David Copperfield, he seduces Emily and then tires of her. He drowns in a ship-wreck, despite the attempts of Ham to save him in David Copperfield.
- Stiggins, Mr is also called the red-nosed man is a minister and is a friend of Mrs Weller and the nemesis of her husband and his son, Samuel Weller in The Pickwick Papers.
- Stiltstalking, Lord Lancaster Minor character in Little Dorrit.
- Strong, Annie Pretty, young wife of Doctor Strong. Annie is suspected of having an affair with her cousin, Jack Maldon in David Copperfield.
- Strong, Doctor Headmaster at the school David attends in Canterbury. He is chiefly concerned with assembling his Greek dictionary in David Copperfield.
- Stryver, Mr A lawyer in A Tale of Two Cities
- Summerson, Esther Principal character in Bleak House. She is brought up an orphan by her aunt, Miss Barbary. On her aunt's death she is adopted by John Jarndyce and becomes companion to his wards, Ada Clare and Richard Carstone. Later in the story it is revealed that Esther is the illegitimate daughter of Captain Hawdon and Lady Dedlock. John Jarndyce falls in love with her and asked her to marry him. She consents out of respect for Jarndyce but during the engagement she falls in love with Allan Woodcourt. When Jarndyce learns of her feelings for Allan he releases her from the engagement and she marries Woodcourt.
- Sweedlepipe, Paul (Poll) A barber and bird-fancier, and Mrs Gamp's landlord in Martin Chuzzlewit. "Poll Sweedlepipe's house was one great bird's nest. Gamecocks resided in the kitchen; pheasants wasted the brightness of their golden plumage on the garret; bantams roosted in the cellar; owls had possession of the bedroom; and specimens of all the smaller fry of birds chirrupped and twittered in the shop."
- Swidger, Milly Wife of William and the only member of the family not touched by Redlaw's gift of forgetting past sorrows, in The Haunted Man. Her inherent goodness, based on remembrance of her lost child, reverses the effects of this curse in her family, the Tetterbys, and Edmund Longford.
- Swidger, Philip Eighty-seven-year-old patriarch of the Swidger family. He loses his present happiness, based on his memories, when touched by Redlaw's gift. He is restored to happiness by Milly Swidger in The Haunted Man.
- Swidger, William Caretaker of the university where Redlaw teaches chemistry. His family is adversely effected by Redlaw's gift of forgetting past sorrows. The adverse effects of this 'gift' are finally reversed by William's wife, Milly in The Haunted Man.
- Swiveller, Dick Friend of Fred Trent, Swiveller has designs to marry Fred's sister, Nell Trent, but is encouraged to wait until Nell has inherited her grandfather's money. When Nell and her grandfather leave London Swiveller is befriended by Quilp who helps him gain employment with the Brasses. While at the Brasses he meets their little half-starved servant, whom he nicknames "the Marchioness". He becomes aware of the Brasses' villainy and, with the Marchioness' help, exposes a plot to frame Kit Nubbles. Swiveller later inherits money from his aunt, puts the Marchioness through school, and ultimately marries her in The Old Curiosity Shop.

== T ==
- Tackleton also known as Gruff and Tackleton, the name of his toymaking business. He is the Scrooge of the story, a hard-hearted, unfeeling man who has lived off of the exploitation of children all his life. He is the employer of Caleb Plummer and schemes to marry May Fielding. Like Scrooge, he softens at the end of the story in The Cricket on the Hearth.
- Tapley, Mark Ostler at the Blue Dragon Inn and servant to young Martin Chuzzlewit. He accompanies Martin to America and later marries Mrs Lupin, the Blue Dragon's landlady. The inn is renamed The Jolly Tapley in Martin Chuzzlewit.
- Tappertit, Simon Locksmith Gabriel Varden's apprentice who is in love with Gabriel's daughter, Dolly. He becomes a leader of the rioters during the Gordon Riots and during the fighting loses his slender legs, long his pride and joy. After the uprising he is fitted with wooden legs and becomes a bootblack in Barnaby Rudge.
- Tartar Retired navy man and friend of Crisparkle. He befriends Neville in London and works with Grewgious and Crisparkle in protecting Neville from John Jasper in The Mystery of Edwin Drood.
- Tattycoram / Harriet Beadle Adopted by the Meagles from the Foundling Hospital, Harriet is given the name Tattycoram and is maid to the Meagles daughter, Pet. She exhibits fits of temper and is counselled by Mr Meagle to "count five and twenty, Tattycoram." She is influenced away from the Meagles by the evil Miss Wade. She later is reunited with the Meagles and assists in the undoing of the Rigaud/Blandois blackmail attempt in Little Dorrit.
- Tetterby family, The Poor family touched by Redlaw's gift of forgetting past sorrows, which turns out to be a curse to them. Adolphus, a newsman, his wife Sophia, Adolphus Jr, a newspaper boy at the railway station, Johnny, who cares for the baby, Sally, called little Moloch. They are restored to their former loving natures by Milly Swidgerin The Haunted Man.
- Ticket, Mrs Cook and housekeeper for the Meagles in Little Dorrit.
- Tiffey, Mr "old clerk with the wig" that had once visited Mr Spenlow at his house in Norwood and had "drunk brown East India sherry there, of a quality so precious as to make a man wink" in David Copperfield.
- Tigg, Montague (Tigg Montague) Con man and swindler who first appears in the story fronting for Chevy Slyme and trying to squeeze the assembled Chuzzlewit family for money. Later he appears in splendor as head of the fraudulent Anglo-Bengalee Disinterested Loan and Life Assurance Company and has changed his name to Tigg Montague. He dupes Jonas Chuzzlewit into joining the company, uses Jonas to fleece Pecksniff, and is murdered by Jonas in Martin Chuzzlewit.
- Tiny Tim See Cratchit, Tiny Tim.
- Tisher, Mrs Miss Twinkleton's assistant at the school for girls at Nun's House in The Mystery of Edwin Drood.
- Todgers, Mrs Proprietor of M. Todgers Commercial Boarding House located near the Monument. Mrs Todgers is described as a "rather bony and hard featured lady." Pecksniff and his daughters stay at Todgers when visiting London in Martin Chuzzlewit .
- Toodle, Polly (Richards) Little Paul Dombey's nurse, known in the Dombey household as Richards. She is dismissed when she takes Paul to visit her family in a poorer section of London. She re-enters the story when Captain Cuttle asked her to look after Sol Gill's Shop, the Wooden Midshipman. She is the mother of Rob the Grinder who falls in with bad company and becomes a minor villain in the story. Dickens describes Polly as a "plump rosy-cheeked wholesome apple-faced young woman." in Dombey and Son
- Toots Scatter-brained classmate of Paul Dombey Jr at Dr Blimber's Academy. Toots falls helplessly in love with Florence Dombey and pursues her, in his absent-minded way, until Florence marries Walter Gay. In the end Toots marries Susan Nipper. Quote: "it's of no consequence." Dombey and Son
- Tox, Lucretia Paul Dombey Sr's sister, Mrs Chick's, friend. She has designs to marry Paul Sr after his first wife dies. Paul marries Mrs Granger instead, breaking Miss Tox's heart, but she stays loyal to him through later hardships. Dickens describes her as "a long lean figure, wearing such a faded air that she seemed not to have been made in what linen-drapers call 'fast colours' originally, and to have, by little and little, washed out." Dombey and Son
- Trabb Tailor who makes Pip a new suit of clothes before he goes to London, also in charge of the mourners at Pip's sister's funeral in Great Expectations.
- Trabb's Boy Assistant to Trabb, the tailor, who terrorizes Pip. He later leads Herbert to the limekiln to rescue Pip from Orlick in Great Expectations.
- Traddles, Tommy Fellow pupil with David Copperfield and Steerforth at Salem House. David's best friend and best man at David's wedding to Dora Spenlow. He later becomes a lawyer and marries Sophy Crewler in David Copperfield.
- Trent, Fred Nell's brother, a gambler, is interested in his grandfather's money through his friend Dick Swiveller in The Old Curiosity Shop.
- Trent, Nelly Known as Little Nell, she is the principal character in The Old Curiosity Shop. She lives with her grandfather, when he falls into the clutches of Daniel Quilp she helps him escape London. The hardships endured during their wanderings are too much for the delicate Nell and she dies in a quiet village where she and her grandfather had gained employment.
- Trotter, Job is the servant of Alfred Jingle in The Pickwick Papers. He helps Jingle to deceive the Pickwickians, using a tale of woe and floods of tears to gain their sympathy.
- Trotwood, Betsey is the sympathetic great-aunt of David Copperfield who takes him in and raises him after he runs away from his abusive step-father, Edward Murdstone.
- Tulkinghorn, Josiah is Sir Leicester Dedlock's lawyer in Bleak House. Scheming and manipulative, he seems to defer to his clients but relishes the power his control of their secrets gives him over them. He learns of Lady Dedlock's past and tries to control her conduct, to preserve the reputation and good name of Sir Leicester. He is murdered, and his murder gives Dickens the chance to weave a detective's investigation of the murder into the plot of the closing chapters of the book.
- Tupman, Tracy is a member of Pickwick Club and a travelling companion of Mr Pickwick in The Pickwick Papers. He has a weakness for the fair sex, which leads to several misadventures.
- Turveydrop, Old Mr is the owner of a dance school in London in Bleak House.
- Turveydrop, Prince is the inheritor of a dance school in London and marries Caddy Jellyby in Bleak House.
- Twist, Oliver, an orphan inhabitant of a work-house, is the protagonist of Oliver Twist.

== V ==
- Vengeance, The A female revolutionary and friend of Madame Defarge in A Tale of Two Cities. She is described as 'a short, rather plump wife of a starved grocer'. At the final execution she is left pondering the absence of Madame Defarge.
- Venus, Mr The taxidermist in Our Mutual Friend. He pretends to go along with Silas Wegg, only to inform Boffin of Wegg's scheme. He eventually marries Pleasant Riderhood.
- Vholes, Mr A Chancery lawyer who takes on Richard Carstone as a client in Bleak House. He squeezes all the litigation fees he can from Carstone, and then abandons him when Jarndyce and Jarndyce comes to an end. He obtains an introduction to Carstone from Harold Skimpole.

== W ==
- Wackles, Sophy Beloved of Dick Swiveller in The Old Curiosity Shop. She breaks his heart when she marries a marked gardener called Cheggs, but Swiveller recovers and marries the little maid of all work that he christens The Marchioness.
- Wade, Miss Resentful orphan in Little Dorrit.
- Wardle, Emily Mr Wardle's daughter who marries Augustus Snodgrass in The Pickwick Papers.
- Wardle, Isabella Mr Wardle's daughter who marries Trundle in The Pickwick Papers.
- Wardle, Mr Yeoman farmer and owner of Manor Farm at Dingley Dell in The Pickwick Papers. Pickwick and his friends visit Manor Farm frequently.
- Wardle, Old Mrs Mr Wardle's partially deaf mother in The Pickwick Papers.
- Wardle, Rachael Mr Wardle's spinster sister (aged fifty years at least). She courts Tupman but is lured into elopement by Jingle, who is after her money. Rachael and Jingle are caught before a marriage can take place and Jingle is bought off by Mr Wardle in The Pickwick Papers.
- Waterbrook, Mr and Mrs Mr Waterbrook is Mr Wickfield's agent with whom Agnes stays while in London. They reside at Ely Place, Holborn in David Copperfield.
- Wegg, Silas A villainous ballad-seller with a wooden leg who finds Harmon's will and attempts to blackmail the Boffins with it (Our Mutual Friend).
- Weller, Samuel Mr Pickwick's manservant and valet is one of the most popular characters in Dickens' works. He counsels his master with idiosyncratic wisdom and is thoroughly devoted to Pickwick in The Pickwick Papers.
- Weller, Tony A retired coachman, and father of Samuel Weller. His wife, Susan, is proprietor of the Marquis of Granby Inn in Dorking. Susan falls in with the hypocritical Reverend Stiggins, of the Brick Lane Temperance Association, who the frequently imbibing Tony later exposes in The Pickwick Papers.
- Wemmick, John is a clerk of Mr Jaggers's, and a friend of Pip in Great Expectations. "I found him to be a dry man, rather short in stature, with a square wooden face, whose expression seemed to have been imperfectly chipped out with a dull-edged chisel...I judged him to be a bachelor from the frayed condition of his linen, and he appeared to have sustained a good many bereavements; for he wore at least four mourning rings, besides a brooch representing a lady and a weeping willow at a tomb with an urn on it. I noticed too, that several rings and seals hung at his watch chain, as if he were quite laden with remembrances of departed friends. He had glittering eyes--small, keen, and black--and thin wide mottled lips. He had had them, to the best of my belief, from forty to fifty years." He cares for his Aged Parent.
- Westlock, John Former pupil of Pecksniff and friend of Tom Pinch although they disagree about Pecksniff's character. He is instrumental in exposing Jonas Chuzzlewit and later marries Tom's sister Ruth in Martin Chuzzlewit.
- Whimple, Mrs The landlady of the house at Mill Pond Bank where Old Bill Barley and his daughter, Clara, live. Magwitch is kept secretly in the house waiting for the escape out of Britain in Great Expectations.
- Wickfield, Agnes is the childhood friend of David Copperfield. She marries David after the death of his first wife, Dora, in David Copperfield.
- Wickfield, Mr The alcoholic father of Agnes Wickfield.
- Wigsby, Professor A botanist who produces a cauliflower somewhat larger than a chaise umbrella in The Mudfog Papers.
- Winkle, Nathaniel is a member of the Pickwick Club and a travelling companion of Mr Pickwick in The Pickwick Papers. He professes to be a keen sportsman, although when his skills are tested he usually appears to be inept.
- Witherfield, Miss is the lady whom Peter Magnus proposes to, in The Pickwick Papers. When Magnus and Pickwick fall out over misplaced discretion, she fears that a duel is about to occur and has Pickwick hauled before the magistrate, Nupkins.
- Wititterley, Henry and Mrs Julia Wititterley Lived in a Mansion in Sloan Square. Kate Nickleby was employed as companion to Mrs Wititterley. Kate hated the job Nicholas Nickleby
- Woodcourt, Dr Allan A physician in Bleak House. A kind, caring man who falls in love with Esther Summerson. She in turn cares for him but feels unable to respond to his overtures because of her prior commitment to John Jarndyce. All is resolved happily at the end and they marry.
- Wopsle, Mr is a theatrical parish clerk (not a member of the clergy) in Great Expectations. "Mr Wopsle, united to a Roman nose and a large shining bald forehead, had a very deep voice which he was uncommonly proud of..."
- Wopsle's great-aunt is Pip's first "teacher" in Great Expectations. "Mr Wopsle's great-aunt kept an evening school in the village, that is to say, she was a ridiculous old woman of limited means and unlimited infirmity, who used to go to sleep from six to seven every evening, in the society of youth who paid two pence per week each, for the improving opportunity of seeing her do it." She also runs a general shop from her home where she employs Biddy (see above).

== Y ==
- York, The Five Sisters of appear in a story told in Nicholas Nickleby.

== Z ==
- Zamiel is a melancholic Frenchman in A Flight.
- Zephyr, The is the pseudonym of Mr Mivins, a prisoner in The Pickwick Papers.
