= John Wemmick =

- Great Expectations character
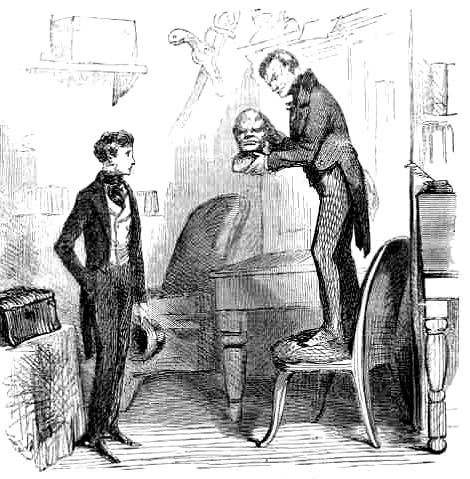
- Wemmick shows the death mask of an executed murderer to Pip in Jaggers's office, by John McLenan
- Created by: Charles Dickens

In-universe information
- Gender: Male
- Occupation: Clerk
- Nationality: British

John Wemmick is a fictional character in Charles Dickens's 1861 novel Great Expectations. He is Mr Jaggers's clerk and the protagonist Pip's friend. Some scholars consider him to be the "most modern man in the book". Additionally, Wemmick is noted as one of Dickens's "most successful" split characters, insofar as Wemmick's character represents an exploration of the "relationship between public and private spheres in a divided existence".

== Profession ==
John Wemmick is a bill collector for the lawyer Mr. Jaggers. The job requires a demanding, uncaring attitude, a personality the working Wemmick takes on. To impress and stay in the favour of his boss, Mr. Jaggers, he berates Jaggers's clients with disdain. He is described as having "the same air of knowing something to everybody else's disadvantage, as his master had". His professional attitude contrasts with Wemmick's more outwardly pleasant home and personal life. Jaggers is a self-centred man who does not seem to pay Wemmick well. When Pip tries to buy a boat he makes fun of him, calling the young boy poor.

== Portable property ==
Wemmick often ventures to Newgate Prison to speak with prisoners currently being represented by Jaggers, or already condemned to die after Jaggers's appointment to them. When Wemmick talks to a prisoner that has been condemned to die, he does his best to take whatever valuable artefacts they may have with them off their hands. This he calls their "portable property". Wemmick does this out of a sense of necessity, given his financially challenged status.

== Relation with Pip ==
At one point in the novel, Wemmick advises Pip to acquire his benefactor Magwitch's "portable property". He argues that despite Pip's noble intentions to help Magwitch, the pragmatic course of action would be to prepare for failure. In acquiring Magwitch's "portable property," Pip would at least be guaranteed his money. After he sends back Magwitch's pocketbook, Pip feels glad despite Wemmick's advice. In the end, Pip forfeits all that Magwitch intended for him to have.

== Personal life ==
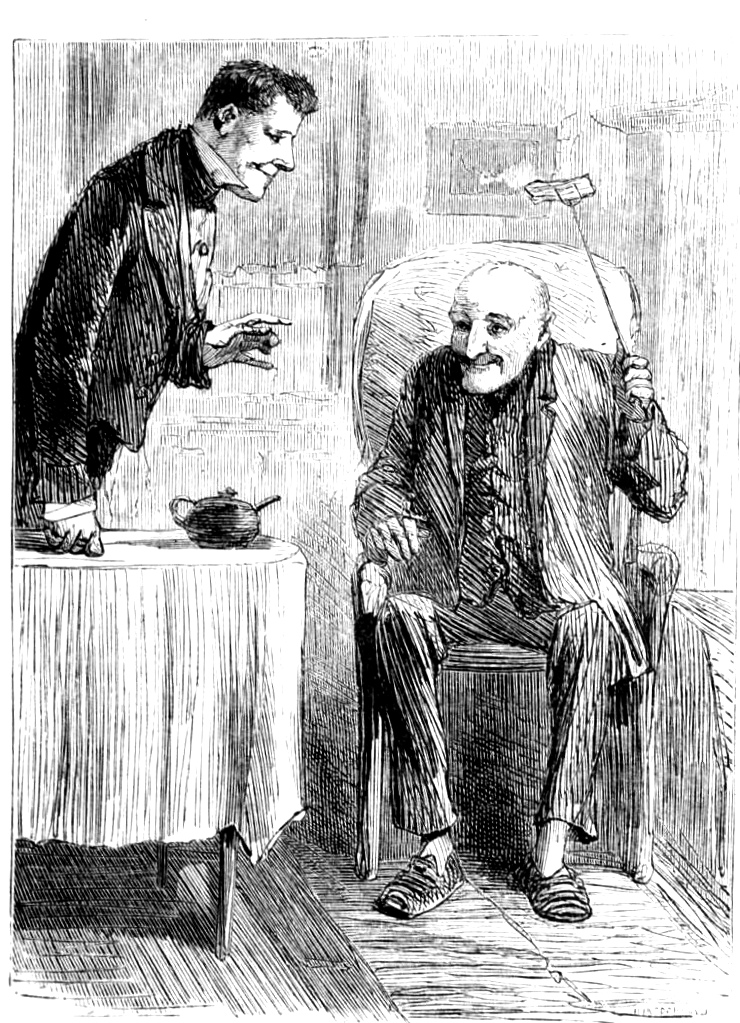
Mr. Wemmick and "The Aged P.", illustration by Sol Eytinge Jr.

Wemmick owns a house in Walworth which is modelled as a castle, complete with a drawbridge, cannon, and moat. Wemmick feels protected from the harsh realities of his profession by his house. As Wemmick tells Pip, "the office is one thing, and private life is another. When I go into the office, I leave the Castle behind me." He lives with his father, who is referred to as "The Aged Parent", "The Aged P.", or simply "The Aged", a nearly deaf man. Wemmick's ingenuity is seen in ways to communicate with his father, as when he returns from work a tile appears reading "John", signalling his father to lower the drawbridge. Every evening at 9 PM Wemmick fires a cannon known as "The Stinger", which is the only object the Aged Parent has the ability to hear. Nothing is known about his mother, and it is currently unknown whether she was alive in the setting of the story.

He is engaged to marry Miss Skiffins, a source of joy in his life. His behavior with Miss Skiffins is another indication of Wemmick's split character status. In his personal life Wemmick, for the first time, also reveals a "sexuality which Dickens comically depicts in his relationship with the brightly apparelled but wooden Miss Skiffins." Pip approves of Wemmick's behaviour around Miss Skiffins, insofar as it humanizes him. This is contrasted with Pip's observation of Wemmick's behaviour in the presence of Jaggers, which he compares to his behaviour around Miss Skiffins by saying "there were twin Wemmicks and this was the wrong one."
