= Bleak House (disambiguation) =

Bleak House is a novel by Charles Dickens.

Bleak House may also refer to:

== Adaptations of the book ==
- Bleak House (1920 film), a silent British film directed by Thomas Bentley
- Bleak House (1959 TV serial)
- Bleak House (1985 TV serial)
- Bleak House (2005 TV serial)

== Places ==
- Bleak House (Knoxville, Tennessee), U.S., an antebellum Classical Revival style house
- Bleak House, Broadstairs, a house on the cliff overlooking the North Foreland and Viking Bay in Broadstairs, Kent, England
- Bleak House, a Registered Heritage Structure on Fogo Island, Newfoundland and Labrador, Canada
- Bleak House, Emneth Hungate, Norfolk, England, the farm belonging to farmer Tony Martin, who shot dead an intruder
- Bleakhouse, a town in Oldbury, West Midlands, England
- Bleak House, a relic of a former cottage on Dartmoor, England

== Other ==
- Bleak House Books, an imprint of Big Earth Publishing
- Bleak House (band), a British heavy metal band
