= Esther Summerson =

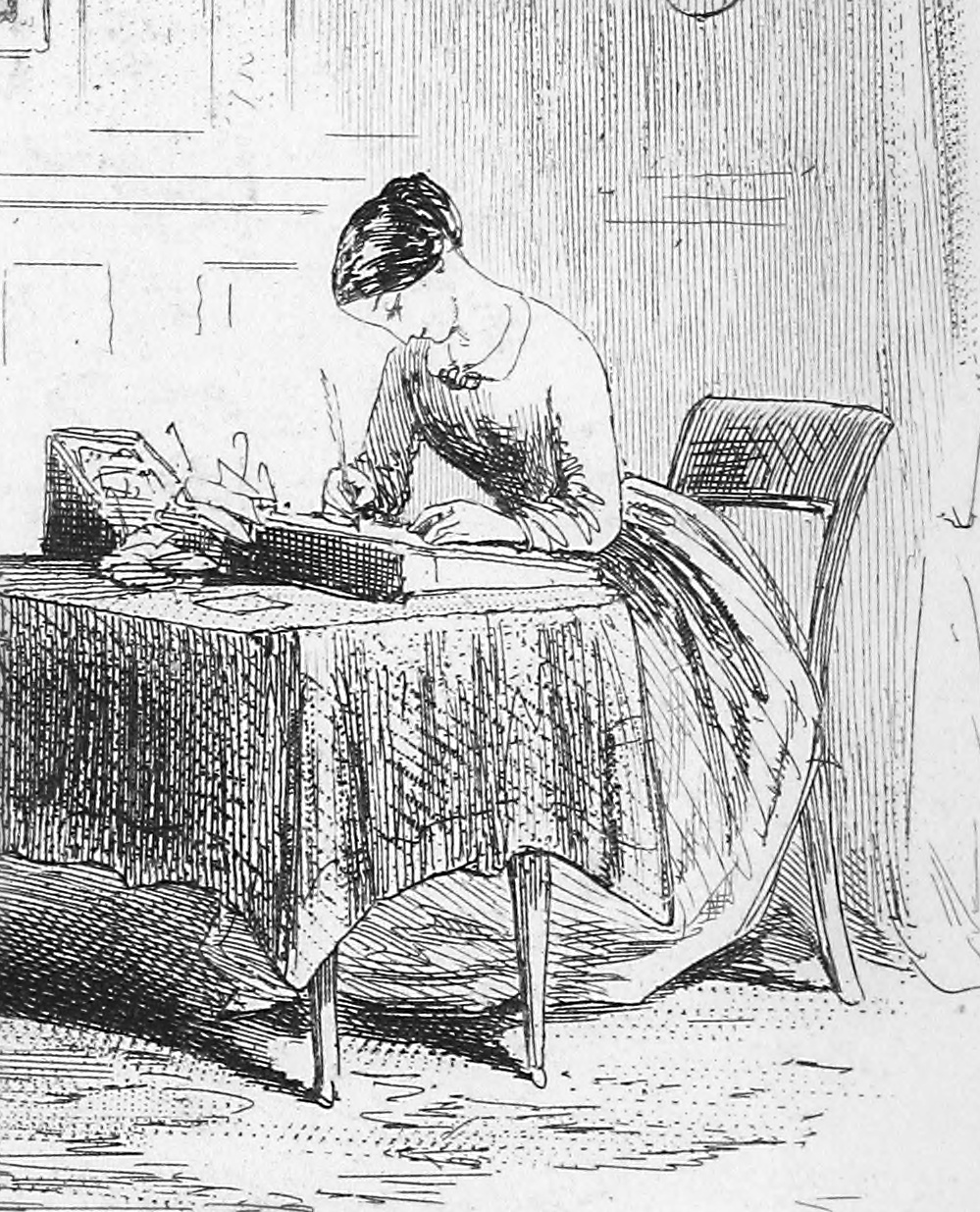
- Esther Summerson by Hablot Browne
- First appearance: Bleak House
- Created by: Charles Dickens

In-universe information
- Gender: Female
- Family: Lady Dedlock (Mother); Captain James Hawdon (Nemo) (Father); Miss Barbary (Aunt); Alan Woodcourt (Husband)

Esther Summerson is a character in Bleak House, an 1853 novel by Charles Dickens. She also serves as one of the novel's two narrators; half the book is written from her perspective. It is the only example of a double narrative in Dickens and the first person female voice may have been influenced by the example of Charlotte Brontë's Jane Eyre, published in 1847.

As a baby, she was brought up by Miss Barbary, a woman she knew as her godmother; this woman was in reality the sister of her unmarried mother, the future Lady Dedlock, and thus Esther's aunt, "in fact if not in law." When her aunt dies suddenly, Esther's care is taken over by the philanthropist, John Jarndyce, who arranges for Esther to receive a sound education as a future governess. When Ada Clare and Richard Carstone, two wards in Chancery, need a home, John Jarndyce welcomes them to Bleak House, his home near St Albans. Esther joins the establishment as Ada's companion and the family's housekeeper. Over the course of Esther's stay at Bleak House, she learns more about her family, contracts smallpox, which results in facial scarring, and learns the identity of her mother, who dies not long after. She becomes engaged to Mr. Jarndyce, her guardian, but ultimately marries a doctor named Allan Woodcourt who had fallen in love with her over the course of the novel.

== Personality ==
From her first introduction as narrator, Esther is firmly established to be a shrewd but damaged and self-deprecating character; her first line contains the claim that she has difficulty writing her story because she knows she is not clever, and she repeats this claim to both her childhood doll and her new guardian Mr. Jarndyce. Throughout the novel, Esther continues to profess her shortcomings through both her narration and dialogue, often internally dismissing compliments given to her by other characters.

Esther is selfless, hard-working and affectionate. She has a tendency to quickly grow fond of the characters she meets; this trait is especially obvious in her first meeting with Ada Clare, whom she refers to as “my love” after only a single conversation. Esther's loving and nurturing personality is also clearly visible in her interactions with Miss Jellyby and Charley, the young girl who becomes her maid. Esther is extremely affectionate toward Charley, going so far as to nurse her back to health when she falls ill even though she contracts the disease herself as a result.

However, Esther is also capable of standing up for herself. When Mr. Guppy proposes to her, for example, she deflects his offer with no small amount of scorn and dislike, going so far as to tell him that his advances are ridiculous.

== Adaptations and portrayals ==
In 1920 silent film of the novel, Esther is portrayed by Berta Gellardi. Diana Fairfax played the role in the 1959 serial. Suzanne Burden starred as Esther in the 1985 adaptation. Later, in the 2005 BBC TV series, Esther is portrayed by Anna Maxwell Martin. An infant Esther also appears briefly in the 2015 series, Dickensian.
