= Bleak House (2005 serial) =

- Genre: Drama
- Based on: Bleak House by Charles Dickens
- Screenplay by: Andrew Davies
- Directed by: Justin Chadwick; Susanna White
- Starring: Denis Lawson; Anna Maxwell Martin; Patrick Kennedy; Carey Mulligan; Gillian Anderson; Charles Dance; Alun Armstrong; Timothy West; Burn Gorman; Harry Eden; Johnny Vegas; Phil Davis; Pauline Collins; Nathaniel Parker; Richard Harrington; Charlie Brooks
- Country of origin: United Kingdom
- Original language: English
- No. of series: 1
- No. of episodes: 15

Production
- Executive producers: Sally Haynes; Laura Mackie
- Producer: Nigel Stafford-Clark
- Running time: 30 minutes 60 minutes (episode 1)
- Production company: BBC Television

Original release
- Network: BBC One
- Release: 27 October – 16 December 2005

Related
- Bleak House (1985)

Bleak House is a fifteen-part BBC television drama serial adaptation of the Charles Dickens novel of the same name, which was originally published in 1852–53 as itself a print serialisation over 20 months. Produced with an all-star cast, the serial was shown on BBC One from 27 October to 16 December 2005, and drew much critical and popular praise.

Written by Andrew Davies, the serial was produced by Nigel Stafford-Clark and directed by Justin Chadwick and Susanna White.

== Plot ==
The longstanding estate battle of Jarndyce v Jarndyce hangs over the heads of many conflicting heirs, confused by multiple wills. Possible beneficiary John Jarndyce of Bleak House welcomes orphaned cousins Ada Clare and Richard Carstone—also potential heirs—as his wards, and has hired Esther Summerson as a housekeeper and companion for Ada. Honoria, Lady Dedlock, the wife of the imperious baronet Sir Leicester, is also a possible beneficiary of the estate. The Dedlocks' lawyer, Tulkinghorn, sniffs out a connection between Lady Dedlock and a recently deceased man called Nemo; as he tries to discover Nemo's true identity, Lady Dedlock secretly seeks information about the dead man herself. Meanwhile, Richard and Ada are falling in love. Richard keeps changing his mind on which career to pursue—first a physician, then a lawyer and then a soldier—but the prospect of his inheritance from the ongoing litigation begins to consume him, despite warnings from John, now his formal guardian. Esther and the young doctor Allan Woodcourt are attracted to each other, but Esther feels unworthy and Allan accepts a commission as a navy physician.

The law clerk Mr Guppy, enamoured of Esther, hopes to win her affection by helping her discover the identity of her parents. He finds connections to both Lady Dedlock and the deceased Nemo, who has been identified as Captain James Hawdon, and is eventually alerted to the existence of letters left behind by Hawdon but kept by his drunken landlord, Krook. Realising that Esther is her daughter who she was told had died—fathered by Hawdon before her current marriage—Lady Dedlock confesses to Esther but swears her to secrecy. Esther is stricken by smallpox and nearly dies; she recovers but is terribly scarred. John proposes marriage to Esther, but though she accepts, he convinces her to keep it secret until she is sure it is what she wants. While amassing other enemies, Tulkinghorn deduces Lady Dedlock's secret and tries to use it to keep her in line.

Tulkinghorn is murdered, with no shortage of suspects. Lady Dedlock is implicated, but Inspector Bucket reveals that her former maid Hortense is the murderess and had tried to frame Lady Dedlock. Richard and Ada are secretly married, but he is obsessed with the lawsuit, encouraged by John's unscrupulous friend Harold Skimpole and the conniving lawyer Vholes. As a result, Richard is penniless and his health is failing. Hawdon's letters—written by a young Lady Dedlock and revealing her secret–find their way back into the hands of the moneylender Smallweed, who sells them to Sir Leicester. Guilty over her deception and not wanting to bring ruin to her husband, Lady Dedlock flees into a storm before Sir Leicester is able to tell her he does not care about her past. He has a stroke but sends Bucket after her. Bucket eventually realises where she must be—the graveyard where Hawdon is buried—but Esther arrives to find her mother dead from exposure. A final Jarndyce will is found that closes the case in favour of Richard and Ada, but the estate has been consumed by years of legal fees. Richard collapses, overcome by tuberculosis, and soon dies. Allan professes his love for Esther, who rebuffs him out of obligation to John, and Ada, pregnant, returns to Bleak House. John releases Esther from their engagement, knowing that she really loves Allan. Esther and Allan marry, with all in attendance.

== Adaptation ==
The adaptation is eight hours in length and covers most of the characters and storylines in the novel. Characters from the book who are not present include the wife of Snagsby, the law stationer; the wife and grandson of the moneylender Smallweed; the law clerk Tony Jobling; the bankrupt Jellyby; Sir Leicester Dedlock's several cousins; and the Bagnet family, friends of the ex-soldier Sergeant George. The character of Clamb, clerk to the lawyer Tulkinghorn, was created by the screenwriter as a device for showing Tulkinghorn's motives and deeds without recourse to a narrator.

Most of the storylines are portrayed substantially as they are in the novel, but somewhat abbreviated. The exceptions to this are in large part consequent upon the aforementioned cull of minor characters. The plot mechanics around the possession of Lady Dedlock's letters, which involve Tony Jobling and Smallweed Junior in the novel, are considerably altered, as are the mechanics of the reconciliation between George and his mother, which is brought about by Mrs. Bagnet in the book. The storyline concerning Mrs. Snagsby's paranoid jealousy of her husband is omitted altogether.

== Production overview ==
The serial was produced by the BBC in association with Nigel Stafford-Clark's company Deep Indigo, with some co-production funding from United States PBS broadcaster WGBH. It was shown on BBC One, on Thursdays at 20:00 and Fridays at 20:30, following the BBC's most popular programme—EastEnders—in an attempt to attract more viewers, particularly younger ones. Requested by the BBC to refresh the classic serial, Stafford-Clark devised both a format and a shooting style that broke with convention. The series started with an hour on Thursday 27 October 2005 followed by 30 minute episodes shown twice weekly, combining the pace and energy of a soap opera with the complex story-telling and high production values of classic drama. BBC One showed omnibus editions of each week's episodes on the Sunday following first broadcast.

Though a few critics argued against the series being shown in this format, programme makers and commentators defended the decision on the basis that Dickens' writings were long, complex, popular stories told over a series of instalments, and the series was merely reflecting Dickens' intentions. Bleak House was indeed originally published in monthly instalments, with cliffhangers used to maintain the continuing interest of the readership.

In the United States, the eight hours were broadcast on PBS on Masterpiece Theatre, where they were compressed and slightly edited into six instalments. The opening and closing episodes were two hours in length, and the middle four episodes were each a single hour. Most PBS stations showed the first-run for the new week's instalment at 21:00 on Sundays from 22 January to 26 February 2006. Bleak House was rebroadcast on Masterpiece Theatre in 2007. Four instalments, two hours each, were shown on most PBS stations from 22 April to 13 May.

Some other overseas broadcasters, such as Australia's ABC, purchased the series in an eight-part, one-hour-episode format.

The programme is also notable for being one of the first British drama series to be shot and produced in the high-definition television format, which required the make-up and set design to be much more detailed than previous productions.

It was filmed on location in Hertfordshire, Bedfordshire, and Kent from February 2005 through to July 2005. The exterior of the Dedlocks' country house, Chesney Wold, was represented by Cobham Hall in Kent, as was the exterior of Mr Tulkinghorn's office. Cobham Hall was also used for some interiors of Chesney Wold such as the hallway and the staircase. The exterior of Bleak House was represented by Ingatestone Hall in Essex. Other houses used for interior shots and garden locations include Balls Park in Hertfordshire, Bromham Hall in Bromham, Bedfordshire, and Luton Hoo in Bedfordshire.

== Cast ==
- Gillian Anderson as Lady Honoria Dedlock
- Timothy West as Sir Leicester Dedlock
- Charles Dance as Mr Tulkinghorn, Sir Leicester's lawyer
- Denis Lawson as John Jarndyce, a rich, friendly man
- Patrick Kennedy as Richard Carstone, ward to Mr Jarndyce
- Carey Mulligan as Ada Clare, ward to Mr Jarndyce
- Anna Maxwell Martin as Esther Summerson, housekeeper to Mr Jarndyce
- Richard Harrington as Allan Woodcourt, a young doctor
- Di Botcher as Mrs Woodcourt, Allan's mother
- Lisa Hammond as Harriet, servant to Mr Jarndyce
- John Lynch as Nemo (Captain James Hawdon)
- Pauline Collins as Miss Flite, a kindly woman
- Tom Georgeson as Clamb, Mr Tulkinghorn's clerk
- Alun Armstrong as Inspector Bucket, a police detective
- Seán McGinley as Snagsby, proprietor of a law stationery
- Burn Gorman as William Guppy, ambitious clerk at Mr Kenge's law firm
- Sheila Hancock as Mrs Guppy, his mother
- Harry Eden as Jo, a street boy
- Charlie Brooks as Jenny, Jo's sister
- Johnny Vegas as Krook, landlord of Nemo and Miss Flite
- Hugo Speer as Sergeant George, friend of Hawdon's from the military
- Michael Smiley as Phil Squod, the Sergeant's employee
- Katie Angelou as Charley Neckett, orphaned girl, Esther's maid
- Anne Reid as Mrs Rouncewell, Lady Dedlock's housekeeper
- Tim Dantay as Mr Rouncewell, her son, whose own son wishes to marry Rosa
- Richard Cant as Mercury, servant to the Dedlocks
- John Sheahan as Fortnum, servant to the Dedlocks
- Lilo Baur as Hortense, Lady Dedlock's French maid
- Emma Williams as Rosa, Lady Dedlock's maid
- Nathaniel Parker as Harold Skimpole, friend of Mr Jarndyce
- Richard Griffiths as Mr Bayham Badger, friend of Mr Jarndyce
- Joanna David as Mrs Badger, his wife
- Warren Clarke as Boythorn, friend of Mr Jarndyce
- Phil Davis as Smallweed, a moneylender
- Tony Haygarth as Gridley, a man beset by legal woes
- Kelly Hunter - Miss Barbary, Lady Dedlock's sister
- Liza Tarbuck as Mrs Jellyby, a charitable woman
- Natalie Press as Caddy Jellyby, her daughter
- Bryan Dick as Prince Turveydrop, Caddy's fiancé, a dance teacher
- Matthew Kelly as Old Mr Turveydrop, Prince's father
- Robert Pugh as Mr Chadband, a friend of Snagsby's
- Catherine Tate as Mrs Chadband, his wife
- Dermot Crowley as Mr Vholes, Richard Carstone's lawyer
- Ian Richardson as Chancellor
- Peter Guinness as Coroner
- Louise Brealey as Judy, Smallweed's granddaughter
- Brian Pettifer as Mr Growler, a physician
- Anthony Cozens as Usher
- Alastair Galbraith as Mr Brownlow, a lawyer
- Alistair McGowan as Mr Kenge
- Sevan Stephan as Mr Tangle, a lawyer
- Roberta Taylor as Mrs Pardiggle

== Reception ==
Previewing the first episode of the serial in the BBC's Radio Times listings magazine in its week of broadcast, critic David Butcher wrote that: "Watching this extraordinary version of Dickens's novel feels less like watching a TV drama and more like sampling a strange other world... it's Gillian Anderson who, despite having only a handful of lines, is at the heart of the drama. It's a magnetic performance (one of many) in a tremendous piece of television."

In the same issue, the magazine—which also devoted its front cover to the programme, a fold-out photograph of the cast posing in modern glamorous dress in the style of a Dynasty-style soap opera cast—contained a preview feature by Christopher Middleton which went behind the scenes of the production. Middleton was equally positive about the adaptation. "The word 'big' doesn't really do it justice," he wrote.

The Radio Times kept up its positive reaction to the series throughout the programme's run. Of episode eight, Butcher again wrote a positive preview. "We're halfway through this mesmerising serial and it shows no sign of letting up," he wrote. "As ever, each frame is composed to perfection, each face lit like an oil painting, and the acting is out of this world. You might want to take the phone off the hook."

For the week of the final episode, the magazine's television editor, Alison Graham, joined in the praise, picking out individual cast members for particular attention. "Anna Maxwell Martin as Esther was a superb heroine, but in years to come it's [Gillian] Anderson's portrayal of a secretly tormented aristocrat that we'll treasure." And of Charles Dance, "As the scheming attorney-at-law, Dance was wolfishly lethal, his hooded eyes and sonorous voice loaded with evil. It's almost enough to make you take against lawyers."

It is ranked in the top 15 of Metacritic's Best TV Shows of All Time, with an aggregate critics' score of 93/100 which remains the highest for any British drama.

The praise for the serial was not, however, universal. Writing for The Guardian newspaper, Philip Hensher criticised the programme sight unseen. Hensher's comments led Andrew Davies to write an open letter to The Guardian in response to Hensher's piece, which appeared in the paper two days after the original article. "I think you know that a film can do a lot more than action and dialogue..."

In terms of viewing figures, Bleak House began with an overnight average audience of 6.6 million for the one-hour opening episode, peaking at 7.2 million and averaging 29% of the total available viewing audience, winning its timeslot. Ratings continued to average around the five to six million mark, with the serial sometimes winning its timeslot but on occasions being beaten into second place by programming on ITV. Bleak House's highest ratings came for the sixth episode on 11 November, which attracted an average of 6.91 million viewers and a 29.5% share of the audience.

The penultimate episode, broadcast on Thursday 15 December, gained an audience of 5.2 million, losing out to The Bill on ITV which gained 6.3 million viewers.

=== Accolades ===
On 7 May 2006, Bleak House won the Best Drama Serial category at the British Academy Television Awards, one of the most prestigious industry awards in the UK, with Anna Maxwell Martin taking the Best Actress award ahead of fellow nominee Gillian Anderson.

In July 2006, the adaptation was nominated for 10 Primetime Emmy Awards, including Outstanding Miniseries, Lead Actor in a Miniseries or Movie (Charles Dance), Lead Actress in a Miniseries or Movie (Gillian Anderson), and Supporting Actor in a Miniseries or Movie (Denis Lawson). It won two Emmys, for Makeup and Cinematography.

Year	Award	Category	Nominee	Result	Ref.
2005	Peabody Awards		BBC, WGBH-TV, Deep Indigo	Won	
2006	Primetime Emmy Awards	Outstanding Miniseries	Rebecca Eaton, Nigel Stafford-Clark	Nominated	
2006	Primetime Emmy Awards	Outstanding Lead Actor in a Miniseries or Movie	Charles Dance	Nominated	
2006	Primetime Emmy Awards	Outstanding Lead Actress in a Miniseries or Movie	Gillian Anderson	Nominated	
2006	Primetime Emmy Awards	Outstanding Supporting Actor in a Miniseries or Movie	Denis Lawson	Nominated	
2006	Primetime Emmy Awards	Outstanding Directing for a Miniseries, Movie, or Dramatic Special	Justin Chadwick	Nominated	
2006	Primetime Emmy Awards	Outstanding Writing for a Miniseries, Movie, or Dramatic Special	Andrew Davies	Nominated	
2006	Primetime Emmy Awards	Outstanding Art Direction for a Miniseries or Movie	Simon Elliott	Nominated	
2006	Primetime Emmy Awards	Outstanding Cinematography for a Miniseries or Movie	Kieran McGuigan (for "Part 1")	Won	
2006	Primetime Emmy Awards	Outstanding Costumes for a Miniseries, Movie, or Special	Andrea Galer, Charlotte Morris (for "Part 1")	Nominated	
2006	Primetime Emmy Awards	Outstanding Makeup for a Miniseries or a Movie (Non-Prosthetic)	Daniel Phillips	Won	
2006	British Academy Television Awards	Best Drama Serial	Nigel Stafford-Clark, Justin Chadwick, Susanna White, Andrew Davies	Won	
2006	British Academy Television Awards	Best Actor	Denis Lawson	Nominated	
2006	British Academy Television Awards	Best Actress	Anna Maxwell Martin	Won	
2006	British Academy Television Awards	Best Actress	Gillian Anderson	Nominated	
2006	British Academy Television Awards	Pioneer Award	Bleak House	Nominated	
2006	British Academy Television Craft Awards	Best Director	Justin Chadwick	Nominated	
2006	British Academy Television Craft Awards	Best Costume Design	Andrea Galer	Won	
2006	British Academy Television Craft Awards	Best Editing: Fiction/Entertainment	Paul Knight	Won	
2006	British Academy Television Craft Awards	Best Make-Up & Hair Design	Daniel Phillips	Nominated	
2006	British Academy Television Craft Awards	Best Photography and Lighting: Fiction/Entertainment	Kieran McGuigan	Nominated	
2006	British Academy Television Craft Awards	Best Production Design	Simon Elliot	Won	
2006	British Academy Television Craft Awards	Best Sound: Fiction/Entertainment	Sound Team	Nominated	
2006	British Academy Television Craft Awards	Best Writer	Andrew Davies	Nominated	
2006	Broadcasting Press Guild Awards	Best Serial	Nigel Stafford-Clark, Andrew Davies, Justin Chadwick, Susanna White	Won	
2006	Broadcasting Press Guild Awards	Best Actor	Charles Dance	Won	
2006	Broadcasting Press Guild Awards	Best Actress	Gillian Anderson	Won	
2006	Broadcasting Press Guild Awards	Best Actress	Anna Maxwell Martin	Nominated	
2006	Broadcasting Press Guild Awards	Writer's Award	Andrew Davies	Nominated	
2006	Costume Designers Guild Awards	Outstanding Made for Television Movie or Miniseries	Andrea Galer	Nominated	
2006	Golden Globe Awards	Best Miniseries or Television Film	Bleak House	Nominated	
2006	Golden Globe Awards	Best Actress – Miniseries or Television Film	Gillian Anderson	Nominated	
2006	Royal Television Society Programme Awards	Drama Serial	Bleak House	Won	
2006	Royal Television Society Programme Awards	Actor: Male	Charles Dance	Nominated	
2006	Royal Television Society Programme Awards	Breakthrough Award – Behind the Scenes	Justin Chadwick	Nominated	
2006	Royal Television Society Programme Awards	Writing: Drama	Andrew Davies	Won	
2006	Royal Television Society Craft & Design Awards	Costume Design - Drama	Andrea Galer	Won	
2006	Royal Television Society Craft & Design Awards	Lighting, Photography and Camera - Photography (Drama)	Kieran McGuigan	Nominated	
2006	Royal Television Society Craft & Design Awards	Make Up Design - Drama	Daniel Phillips	Won	
2006	Royal Television Society Craft & Design Awards	Music - Original Score	John Lunn	Nominated	
2006	Royal Television Society Craft & Design Awards	Music - Original Title	John Lunn	Nominated	
2006	Royal Television Society Craft & Design Awards	Tape & Film Editing - Drama	Paul Knight	Won	
2006	Satellite Awards	Best Miniseries	Bleak House	Nominated	
2006	Satellite Awards	Best Actor in a Miniseries or Motion Picture Made for Television	Charles Dance	Nominated	
2006	Satellite Awards	Best Actress in a Miniseries or Motion Picture Made for Television	Gillian Anderson	Nominated	
2006	Television Critics Association Awards	Outstanding Achievement in Movies, Miniseries and Specials	Bleak House	Nominated	
2006	Producers Guild of America Awards	David L. Wolper Award for Outstanding Producer of Long-Form Television	Nigel Stafford-Clark	Nominated	

== Previous versions ==
The BBC had previously adapted the novel twice, in 1959 (eleven episodes) and 1985 (eight episodes). In the silent film era it was filmed in 1920 and 1922; the later version starred Sybil Thorndike as Lady Dedlock. The BBC also adapted the book for radio.

== See also ==
- The Passion, a BBC drama by the same producer that uses the same soap-opera format.
- Dickensian, a BBC drama in the same half-hour format that serves in part as a prequel to Bleak House.
