= Dickensian (TV series) =

British drama television series

- Genre: Drama
- Created by: Tony Jordan
- Written by: Tony Jordan; Sarah Phelps; Simon Winstone; Julie Rutterford; Justin Young; Chloe Moss
- Directed by: Harry Bradbeer; Philippa Langdale; Mark Brozel; Andy Hay
- Composer: Debbie Wiseman
- Country of origin: United Kingdom
- Original language: English
- No. of series: 1
- No. of episodes: 20 (Netflix 10)

Production
- Running time: 30 minutes (final episode 50 min.) (60 mins on Netflix (final episode 1h 20m))
- Production company: Red Planet Pictures

Original release
- Network: BBC One
- Release: 26 December 2015 – 21 February 2016

Dickensian is a British drama television series that premiered on BBC One from 26 December 2015 to 21 February 2016. The 20-part series, created and co-written by Tony Jordan, brings characters from many Charles Dickens' novels together in one Victorian London neighborhood, as Inspector Bucket investigates the murder of Ebenezer Scrooge's partner Jacob Marley.

== Production ==
Dickensian was commissioned by Danny Cohen and Ben Stephenson. The executive producers are Polly Hill and Tony Jordan, and the production company behind the series is Red Planet Pictures. Red Planet Pictures's Alex Jones vowed to lobby HM Revenue and Customs and the Department for Culture, Media and Sport to relax the tax-relief rules for Dickensian; tax relief is only given for dramas longer than 30 minutes and each episode of Dickensian lasts 30 minutes.

In April 2016, the BBC confirmed that they had cancelled the show after one series.

== Cast ==
The cast includes the following:

Character	Actor	Episodes	Amazon Episodes	Book
Jacob Marley	Peter Firth	1–2, 18–20	1, 9–10	A Christmas Carol
Arthur Havisham	Joseph Quinn	1–20	1–10	Great Expectations
Honoria, Lady Dedlock	Sophie Rundle	1–20	1–10	Bleak House
Amelia Havisham	Tuppence Middleton	1–20	1–10	Great Expectations
Frances Barbary	Alexandra Moen	1–20	1–10	Bleak House
Meriwether Compeyson	Tom Weston-Jones	1–20	1–10	Great Expectations
Bob Cratchit	Robert Wilfort	1–20	1–10	A Christmas Carol
Ebenezer Scrooge	Ned Dennehy	1–20	1–10	A Christmas Carol
Bill Sikes	Mark Stanley	1–20	1–10	Oliver Twist
Peter Cratchit	Brenock O'Connor	1–20	1–10	A Christmas Carol
Grandfather	Karl Johnson	1–3	1–2	The Old Curiosity Shop
Edward Barbary	Adrian Rawlins	1–19	1–10	Bleak House
Nancy	Bethany Muir	1–20	1–10	Oliver Twist
Fagin	Anton Lesser	1–20	1–10	Oliver Twist
Captain James Hawdon	Ben Starr	1–17	1–9	Bleak House
Martha Cratchit	Phoebe Dynevor	1–20	1–10	A Christmas Carol
John Bagnet	Oliver Coopersmith	1–20	1–10	Bleak House
Nell Trent	Imogen Faires	1–15	1–8	The Old Curiosity Shop
Emily Cratchit	Jennifer Hennessy	1–20	1–10	A Christmas Carol
Silas Wegg	Christopher Fairbank	1–20	1–10	Our Mutual Friend
Mr Jaggers	John Heffernan	1–20	1–10	Great Expectations
Mr Bumble	Richard Ridings	1–20	1–10	Oliver Twist
Mrs Bumble	Caroline Quentin	1–20	1–10	Oliver Twist
Tiny Tim Cratchit	Zaak Conway	1–20	1–10	A Christmas Carol
Mrs Gamp	Pauline Collins	1–20	1–10	Martin Chuzzlewit
Boy	Benjamin Campbell	1–20	1–10	
Fanny Biggetywitch	Ellie Haddington	2–20	1–10	
Inspector Bucket	Stephen Rea	2–20	1–10	Bleak House
Mr Venus	Omid Djalili	2–20	1–10	Our Mutual Friend
Mary	Amy Dunn	2–20	1–10	The Pickwick Papers
Sergeant George	Ukweli Roach	3–20	2–10	Bleak House
Sir Leicester Dedlock	Richard Cordery	4–19	2–10	Bleak House
Desk Sergeant	Neil Findlater	5–6	3	
Matthew Pocket	Sam Hoare	6–10, 18–19	3–5, 9–10	Great Expectations
Constable Duff	Jack Shalloo	6–20	3–10	Oliver Twist
Artful Dodger	Wilson Radjou-Pujalte	7–14, 20	4–7, 10	Oliver Twist
Thomas Gradgrind	Richard Durden	10–19	5–10	Hard Times
Sally Compeyson	Antonia Bernath	12–17	6–9	Great Expectations
Oliver Twist	Leonardo Dickens	12–20	6–10	Oliver Twist
Reverend Chadband	Stuart McQuarrie	14	7	Bleak House
Reverend Crisparkle	Richard Cunningham	14–19	7–10	The Mystery of Edwin Drood
Major Bagstock	Mike Burnside	14–19	7–10	Dombey and Son
Lowten	Paul Lancaster	15–18	7–9	The Pickwick Papers

== Episodes ==
No.	Title	Directed by	Written by	Original release date	UK viewers (millions)
1	"Episode 1"	Harry Bradbeer	Tony Jordan	26 December 2015	7.17
Christmas Eve. Jacob Marley collects from Grandfather, who is soon relieved at Nell's recovery from an illness. Amelia Havisham learns from Mr Jaggers that she has inherited most of her late father's estate; her brother Arthur, angered by the news, stages a confrontation that his accomplice, Meriwether Compeyson, acting the innocent passerby, curtails before escorting Amelia to Satis House. At Marley's request, Fagin has Sikes bring Nancy to the moneylender's house. Bob Cratchit scrounges together a supper for his family. Marley is found murdered in a dockside alley.
2	"Episode 2"	Harry Bradbeer	Tony Jordan	26 December 2015	6.30
Christmas Day. Mr Venus examines (and identifies) Marley's body for Inspector Bucket, and finds a piece of wood in the dead man's head wound. Edward Barbary will not tell daughter Honoria of their financial troubles. Inspector Bucket discovers that Marley's wallet is missing and that he had last had an appointment with someone noted only as "C". Amelia rejects Compeyson's proposal to act as a peaceful intermediary in her dispute with Arthur. Peter Cratchit gives Nell a present that is also a token of his affection. Frances learns of her sister Honoria's secret romance with Captain Hawdon. Compeyson tells Arthur that, after Amelia showed him the door, he is now determined to financially ruin her.
3	"Episode 3"	Harry Bradbeer	Tony Jordan	27 December 2015	5.96
Bill Sikes is taken into custody after Inspector Bucket finds a wooden cosh on his premises. Compeyson presses Arthur for money in order to better impersonate a man of means when he next sees Amelia. Frances destroys a note for Captain Hawdon that would have seen him receive a promotion to Major, elevating him and her sister. Amelia beseeches Arthur to come home but he resentfully refuses because she will not renounce their father's will. Mr Venus tells Inspector Bucket that the wood from Marley's wound doesn't come from Sikes' cosh; Sikes is released. Arthur procures a loan from Scrooge to pay Compeyson. Honoria learns of her family's dire financial straits. Fagin, it's revealed, is in possession of Marley's wallet.
4	"Episode 4"	Harry Bradbeer	Sarah Phelps	27 December 2015	5.78
Marley is given a common burial. Nancy tells Inspector Bucket that her bruised face is because of Marley and she too eagerly offers an alibi for Sikes. Frances runs into Sir Leicester, country neighbour to her ex-fiancé, but admits over tea that she fibbed to her family about breaking off the engagement (it was he who did). Jaggers informs Arthur of a codicil decreeing that, should he act antagonistic to the business, his inheritance will be forfeit. Sir Leicester is enthralled by Honoria at first sight. Martha and John's wedding approaches. Arthur joins Amelia for the grand New Year's reception but Compeyson intrudes, icily snubbing Amelia. Jaggers tells Inspector Bucket that Marley had wanted to leave his partnership with Scrooge.
5	"Episode 5"	Harry Bradbeer	Sarah Phelps	1 January 2016	5.28
As the new year arrives with the chimes of midnight, Arthur, drunk, stumbles into Sikes, who pickpockets his watch and wallet, selling them to Fagin. Compeyson confronts Arthur and forces him to reveal why his father never left all the money to him. Arthur reveals he is homosexual. Compeyson insinuates himself with Captain Hawdon to get closer to Honoria and Amelia. Edward puts up his house as collateral for a loan from Scrooge. Inspector Bucket scours Marley's ledger for clues. Sir Leicester dashes Frances' hopes when he tells her he is smitten with her sister instead. Compeyson steals Amelia's dog, staging a public rescue of it from the wheels of a passing coach; he apologizes to Amelia for his rudeness and implies his love for her. Just as Bob is about to escort Martha to her wedding, Inspector Bucket arrives to arrest him for murdering Marley.
6	"Episode 6"	Philippa Langdale	Simon Winstone	6 January 2016	<4.78
Bob Cratchit tells Bucket that he was scrounging for food when Marley was murdered but admits he crossed out the loan to him noted in Marley's ledger—money for him to replace the necklace that his wife, Emily, will give Martha—and that Marley docked his wages. Compeyson continues to toy with Amelia's feelings. Mrs Bumble needles Mr Bumble to raise them up. Bob transferred the loan to his own book, his ledger shows, so Bucket allows him to attend his daughter's wedding. Frances introduces Sir Leicester to Honoria and tells her to encourage him, for James Hawdon is unsuitable. Amelia's cousin Matthew Pocket visits, so she calls off her business meeting with Compeyson. After Martha and John's wedding celebration, Martha returns the necklace to her mother and Bob returns to the station, where he is locked up. Bucket lets him go after Emily pleads for Bob's release, saying that he was home by 9 on the night of Marley's murder. Emily pawns the necklace at Nell's shop so that Bob will not be in debt to Scrooge. Bucket tells Venus that Bob Cratchit remains a suspect, especially now that his wife has lied for him.
7	"Episode 7"	Philippa Langdale	Julie Rutterford	7 January 2016	<4.78
Inspector Bucket sets his sights on Silas Wegg. The Artful Dodger steals for Sikes, then secretly reports on him to Fagin. Bob Cratchit repays his loan but Scrooge says he shall punish him nonetheless. The Dodger spies on Sikes playing the gentleman to win Nancy's heart. Matthew, whom Amelia has now involved with the brewery, meets Arthur and Compeyson at the tavern. Frances prevents James Hawdon from meeting Edward, then ambushes her sister with Sir Leicester, come to see Honoria. Mrs Bumble rewrites her husband's letter to the board, inviting a Mr Gradgrind to a feast at their establishment. Scrooge will make Bob work late every night. Compeyson fools Matthew into trusting him, then orchestrates his rescue during a drunken dare of jumping between rooftops. Wegg tells Bucket that he heard Marley, that fateful evening, say "Barnaby" while arguing with a "gent"; Bucket realizes that he is referring to Edward Barbary.
8	"Episode 8"	Philippa Langdale	Julie Rutterford	13 January 2016	<4.73
Edward tells Bucket that he sold his late wife's ring to Fagin at the docks to pay off his debt to Marley that night, around 8 or 9 o'clock. Sikes wants to buy Nancy from Fagin, but Fagin demands £50 for her. Arthur, desperate, is about to tell Matthew that he is in the grips of Compeyson when the man himself arrives. Matthew leaves telling Arthur to join him and Compeyson to Sunday lunch with Amelia, as she still wishes to see him. Compeyson reminds Arthur that if he strays from the plan, he can ruin him as he knows his secret. Frances provides Bucket with an alibi for her father: carolers visited at 9:40. Compeyson, noting Matthew's puppy-ish love for Amelia, tells Matthew to make his fortune in America, returning to impress her as a self-made man. The gin-guzzling Mrs Gamp schemes her way to becoming Wegg's live-in nurse. Matthew tells Amelia that he has decided to leave for America. Jaggers tells Edward that his stock was seized and taken from the ship before it set sail; he is ruined. Having seen off Matthew, Compeyson dog-naps Amelia's beloved Jip, takes it in a bag to the docks, then drops it in the river.
9	"Episode 9"	Philippa Langdale	Justin Young	14 January 2016	<4.73
Bucket warns the Artful Dodger to stop thieving, only for the boy to pickpocket his wallet. Edward fails to find temporary relief from his dire financial plight. Compeyson offers Amelia a new dog, but she wonders about his mercurial nature, which he explains as his turbulent love for her. Peter gets an inkling of what to give Nell for her birthday. In preparation for Mr Gradgrind's visit, Mrs Bumble purchases a globe, new china, new cutlery, and even new coal. Edward fails to repay Scrooge's loan. Sikes tells Nancy he wants only her. Wegg goes too far in reciprocating Mrs Gamp's attentions. Compeyson concocts a story of being jilted at the altar to gain Amelia's sympathy; she accepts the dog; they kiss. James Hawdon meets Edward but Honoria's father thinks little of the captain's prospects. Notices of a £5 reward for information about Marley's murder are posted in the neighbourhood. Edward is taken away to debtors' prison.
10	"Episode 10"	Philippa Langdale	Tony Jordan	21 January 2016	<4.59
Honoria appeals to her jailed father's creditor, Scrooge, but he dismisses her and tells Bob to have the Barbarys' possessions valued posthaste. Compeyson wants £50 more from Arthur for his scheme to seduce Amelia out of her fortune; to raise some of it, Arthur sells cufflinks, a ring, and a flask to Fagin. Compeyson deviously shames Honoria into not asking Amelia for money; he then tells Amelia that Honoria felt insulted at his mere suggestion that Amelia help her financially. Frances pressures her sister to pursue the wealthy Sir Leicester. The Bumbles wine and dine Mr Gradgrind, who says, of their request for a better position, "Duly noted," but Mrs Bumble doesn't reward her husband in the way that she suggested. Honoria is appalled to see that her father has suffered an injury in prison; ashamed, Edward demands to be taken from her sight. Compeyson ejects a boozy, resentful Arthur from Satis House before he can give their game away to Amelia. As Nancy finishes leading the Three Cripples in song below, Compeyson visits Arthur upstairs, thrashing him with a belt as punishment for his drunken delinquency.
11	"Episode 11"	Mark Brozel	Tony Jordan	22 January 2016	<4.59
Amelia tells Honoria that she is smitten with Compeyson. Tiny Tim is ill. After selling her mother's necklace to Nell, Honoria visits her father, who tells her that his debt runs into the thousands. Mr Bumble and Silas Wegg commiserate over their frustrations with the opposite sex. Bucket learns from Emily of a warehouse on the dock, Croucher's, purchased by Marley; Jaggers gives details of the property to Bucket. After Honoria meets with Sir Leicester, she tells James that they have no future together; he accuses her of seeking a wealthy suitor in order to procure her father's release. The Bumbles receive a letter from the trustees, offering them an establishment in Staffordshire with their very own maid. Sir Leicester pays Edward's debts and gains his release. Keeping watch on Croucher's, Bucket sees Fagin arrive at the warehouse. Honoria assents to Sir Leicester paying her another visit but now feels like a woman bought and sold.
12	"Episode 12"	Mark Brozel	Chloe Moss	27 January 2016	<4.33
Bucket finds that Fagin is using Croucher's Warehouse as a depot for urchins and waifs before shipping them overseas to work in mines. En route to the brewery shareholders' meeting, Arthur and Compeyson are waylaid by Compeyson's wife; Compeyson assures her that he shall soon make them a fortune and pay their debts. He arrives as the meeting ends, with Amelia applauded for her business acumen. Bucket talks to a little boy who saw a man, resembling Marley, arguing with Fagin at the warehouse on Christmas Eve. Peter gives his money for Nell's present to his distraught mother for Tiny Tim's medicine. Fagin tells Bucket that the business at the warehouse was Marley's idea and they were partners. Honoria boxes up James' photograph and letters to her. Bucket sees that the boy is taken into the Bumbles' workhouse. Silas Wegg kicks Mrs Gamp out of his tavern after he discovers his gin stock is missing. Compeyson asks Amelia to be his wife, proffering her a ring—the ring that he slipped off his sleeping wife's finger.
13	"Episode 13"	Mark Brozel	Tony Jordan	28 January 2016	<4.33
14	"Episode 14"	Mark Brozel	Justin Young	4 February 2016	N/A
Bucket brings Dodger in to the station. Honoria discloses her pregnancy to a happy James; Frances tells them that Honoria will go to the country and she will arrange for a minister to marry them. Dodger says that he stole Marley's wallet when he thought the man was senselessly drunk, but Bucket puts him in a cell. Frances pays Mrs Gamp in money for gin to keep quiet about Honoria's pregnancy. Compeyson persuades Amelia to buy Arthur's shares at twice their worth, thus paying off his debts and returning him to the life of a gentleman; Compeyson then tells Arthur that he is released from what is now his scheme alone. Bill and Nancy use their wiles to spring Dodger from jail. Sitting before the trustees, an overanxious Mr Bumble splits his too-snug suit in the back. Peter, ashamed of his penury, tells Nell that he is too busy to see her. Venus gives Bob a crutch for crippled Tim. Before he goes on the run, Dodger tells Sikes where Fagin keeps his cash.
15	"Episode 15"	Mark Brozel	Chloe Moss	5 February 2016	N/A
James sneaks in to be with Honoria while Frances is out. Amelia buys Arthur's shares for £10,000. Jaggers tells his clerk to investigate Compeyson. Inspector Thompson steps in to take Bucket off the case. Arthur threatens to tell Amelia of Compeyson's wife, but Compeyson retorts that he would tell her of Arthur's secret that he is homosexual. Thompson has a man beaten into falsely confessing to Marley's murder; Bucket releases Fagin. James confronts Frances about interfering with his possible promotion and asks Honoria to leave with him; Frances protests that she was protecting her sister and Honoria begs James' patience. Mrs Bumble flirtingly convinces Gradgrind to overlook her husband's stumbling interview. Sikes completes his purchase of Nancy with the money he stole from Fagin; she and Fagin bid each other farewell. Bucket tells Venus that he will continue his investigation on the sly. Honoria is appalled to find a letter to Sir Leicester that Frances wrote in her name. Amelia, aghast, espies Compeyson kissing a woman (his wife) on the cheek. Honoria, packed, about to leave, and angry with her sister, suddenly feels what may be labour pains.
16	"Episode 16"	Andy Hay	Sarah Phelps	11 February 2016	N/A
Honoria demands that Frances send for James, drinking at the Three Cripples, so he will fetch and pay for a doctor. Amelia, removing her ring, tells her maid to forbid Compeyson entry to Satis House. James, seeing the letter is from Frances, tosses it in the fire. Sikes acts more possessive of Nancy. Frances insists the child is a stain on the family name. Honoria wonders at Frances' spitefulness; Frances confesses that her fiancé ended their engagement because she was not as "vivacious" as her sister and even Sir Leicester prefers Honoria to her. Honoria tells her, "I loved you most" and reveals that she will name the child, if a girl, "Esther Frances". Reconciled, the sisters do welcome a girl into the household but the baby, premature, stops breathing. Honoria, self-abasing, is grief-stricken; Frances places the body in a basket in a cupboard downstairs. Of James, Honoria says, in a daze, "He didn't come." Downstairs, Frances hears the baby come alive with a cry; amazed, she is about to tell Honoria but decides not to, instead stooping to tend to the girl herself.
17	"Episode 17"	Andy Hay	Sarah Phelps	12 February 2016	N/A
Amelia tells Compeyson that she knows about his "lady friend" and sends him away. Frances steals through the streets with little Esther, handing her over to a shadowy figure in a dockside alley. Arthur talks of reconciling with his sister to unite them against Compeyson. James proposes to Honoria, who then tells him of their loss and ends their relationship. Amelia confronts Compeyson again, only for his wife to arrive and pass herself off as his sister. Her false tale deceives Amelia, who returns home distraught in her coach only for Compeyson to leap in and kiss her. Bucket returns to the scene of Marley's death with Mr Venus and concludes that the killer was an ordinary man pushed to his limit by the moneylender. Arthur returns to Satis House but finds Compeyson ardently reunited with Amelia. Bucket matches the wooden splinter from the cosh-like weapon to the rolling-pin that Emily Cratchit uses for the Three Cripples' meat pies. Bucket declares he will arrest her husband again, but Emily confesses to being the killer.
18	"Episode 18"	Andy Hay	Tony Jordan	18 February 2016	N/A
Emily recounts to Bucket her movements on Christmas Eve: upset over Bob's docked wages, she confronted Marley, who said he would be dockside, a dangerous area at night, at nine o'clock; Emily went there, armed with a rolling pin; Marley turned nasty, talked of selling off her children, and, as he groped her, she struck him a blow, then ran home. Compeyson, having found out that Jaggers' clerk is investigating him, tells Arthur the man may discover their collusion. Honoria remains grief-stricken but Edward's business hopes depend on Sir Leicester's involvement, so he tells Frances to send word to him. Bucket visits Manning, in jail for Marley's murder, and the vile prisoner cackles about those he has killed. Jaggers' clerk, Lowten, tells him that his investigation has uncovered nothing, then collects payment from Arthur for losing all the damning documents he had found. Honoria summons the strength to come down and talk to Sir Leicester. Matthew Pocket tells Arthur that he has returned to deal with Compeyson. Bucket takes Emily to the station but, amid a squalid melee, decides to let her go and allow Manning to hang for Marley's murder.
19	"Episode 19"	Andy Hay	Tony Jordan	19 February 2016	N/A
The day before Amelia and Compeyson's wedding, Matthew has Arthur lure Compeyson away so that he can tell Amelia the truth about him. The Bumbles and the orphans prepare the home for the trustees' visit. Honoria demands that the planned union between her and Sir Leicester no longer be spoken of so falsely by her father and Frances. Matthew gathers the board members; they all visit Amelia and urge her not to marry so hastily, as Compeyson will then control all her assets. Compeyson returns, telling Amelia of Matthew's love for her; Amelia accuses Matthew of self-interest, forbids Matthew and Arthur from visiting Satis House, and, determined to go ahead with the wedding, clings to Compeyson. Sir Leicester proposes to a resigned Honoria, who accepts. Matthew leaves, vanquished, seeing that Amelia now trusts no one but Compeyson. When one orphan (Oliver Twist) asks for more, the trustees, appalled at such disrespect, leave the Bumbles unpromoted; Mrs Bumble, outraged, kicks the boy out of doors.
20	"Episode 20"	Andy Hay	Tony Jordan	21 February 2016	N/A
The wedding day; Jaggers tells Arthur to become his own man. Oliver is living on the street. Nancy tells Fagin to make peace with Dodger and Sikes. Mrs Bumble continues to insist that Mr Bumble raise them up. Scrooge sneeringly rejects Fagin's proposal of a partnership. Arthur summons Compeyson and Jaggers informs him that he must deliver to Amelia his written confession, accepting Arthur's £10,000 from the brewery in return or be arrested. At Satis House, the bride in her wedding gown, appalled, reads Compeyson's confession. Compeyson professes his true love for her now but Amelia retorts that he has made her look a fool and betrayed her. "You have broken me," she says; Compeyson leaves, taking the money. Amelia vows that she will wear her dress until her heart heals, declares herself brother-less, and sends all away as she wails in crazed anguish. Fagin and Dodger reconcile, with the boy trudging back to work for him. Amelia tells her servants to leave the dining-room as is and close the gates to Satis House. Arthur returns to his room and to his drink. Sikes begins to order Nancy about. Honoria, soon to leave for Chesney Wold and Sir Leicester, hands Frances a necklace that Captain Hawdon had given her, to be buried with their child; Frances, meeting Jaggers in secret, gives him the necklace to bring to Esther. The Cratchits enjoy dinner on Bob and Emily's anniversary. Inspector Bucket tells Mr Venus that he has a new case—a man was killed in a windowless room, the door locked from inside. As Nancy sings to the customers in The Three Cripples, Arthur steps despairingly out onto the roof while Amelia sits, frozen, before the table where the wedding cake remains, untouched. At home, Scrooge reads, his candle flickers out and he hears Marley's ghostly voice. Dodger offers Oliver some bread and takes him to Fagin, who will give him lodgings.

== References to other Dickens' characters and works ==
Honoria Barbary and Martha Cratchit work in a dress-shop, Mantalini's—a reference to Madame Mantalini, a milliner in Nicholas Nickleby. The toy shop in the neighbourhood, Gruff and Tackleton, appears in The Cricket on the Hearth. The coffee-house on the street is Garraway's, frequented in real life by Dickens and appearing in The Pickwick Papers, Martin Chuzzlewit, Little Dorrit, and The Uncommercial Traveller. Amelia Havisham's first dog here is Jip, the spaniel that is Dora Spenlow's lapdog in David Copperfield. Constable Duff, who appears briefly in a few episodes, is a character from Oliver Twist.

Episode 1: Jaggers mentions his clerk "Mr Heep"—Uriah Heep from David Copperfield; Silas Wegg, the tapman at The Three Cripples (a tavern in Oliver Twist), gives barmaid Daisy a tray of drinks to take back to "Mr Pickwick and his guests" (The Pickwick Papers). At the New Years reception hosted by the Haversham siblings, the tune being played during the dancing is called "Sir Roger de Coverly" and is played at Fezziwig’s Christmas party in A Christmas Carol.

Episode 4: Jaggers talks of often considering an end to his partnership with Mr Tulkinghorn (from Bleak House).

Episode 6: Scrooge snaps at Cratchit that, in renegotiating terms of a loan, he must surely "have consulted with Jacob Marley's ghost"—a foreshadowing of A Christmas Carol. Mrs Gamp talks of seeing a "Mr Wemmick," like Silas Wegg, go gray and lose his leg—this may be a reference to the father of John Wemmick, in Great Expectations, referred to by his son as "The Aged Parent" or "The Aged P".

Episode 7: In mishearing "Barbary" as "Barnaby," Silas Wegg happens to allude to the title character of Barnaby Rudge. Compeyson's and Matthew Pocket's drunken leaps between rooftops echo Bill Sikes' death in Oliver Twist, when he accidentally hangs himself while trying to descend from a rooftop.

Episode 9: Edward Barbary calls on a Mr Darley for help with his finances, to no avail; the last name suggests F. O. C. Darley, a nineteenth-century American artist who did illustrations for a number of Dickens editions that appeared in the United States.

Episode 10: Honoria's question to her father's creditor, "Have you no heart, Mr Scrooge?", and Mrs Bumble's remark, "'ave you no 'eart, Bumble?", echo the moment in Little Dorrit, Dickens' novel about debtors' prison, when Frederick Dorrit asks Fanny, "Have you no memory? Have you no heart?" They also presage Estella's words in Great Expectations: "You must know . . . that I have no heart—if that has anything to do with my memory."

Episode 12: On leaving the little boy in the care of the Bumbles at the workhouse, Inspector Bucket's parting advice, "Manners are important, and so is standing up for yourself," presages the starving Oliver Twist politely demanding more gruel in the Bumbles' workhouse: "Please, sir, I want some more" (a moment essentially recreated in Episode 19).

Episode 13: When the Artful Dodger visits Fagin in his cell, the image of the man foretells the famous 1839 drawing by George Cruikshank, for Oliver Twist, of "Fagin in the condemned Cell." Honoria learns she is pregnant—the child will be Esther Summerson, the narrator (in some chapters) and main protagonist of Bleak House.

Episode 14: Dodger refers to another of the boys in his gang as "Charley," presumably meaning that said boy is Oliver Twist character Charley Bates. Bob Cratchit says of his son that he "can bear him on my shoulders until [my] strength returns," but in A Christmas Carol he is still bearing Tiny Tim "upon his shoulder". The clergyman (only named in the credits) whom Bill has smuggle a match in to Dodger in jail is the slimy Reverend Chadband (Bleak House), extorted to do so here because he had relations with Nancy. The "Major Bagstock" on the board of trustees before which Mr Bumble presents himself is a friend of Mr Dombey in Dombey and Son; the churchman on the board (only named in the credits) is Reverend Crisparkle (The Mystery of Edwin Drood).

Episodes 15 and 18: The clerk ordered by Jaggers to find out all he can about Compeyson is Lowten, a clerk in The Pickwick Papers.

Episode 18: The name of the murderer in jail, Manning, suggests the real-life killer Marie Manning, the inspiration for Mademoiselle Hortense in Bleak House. When Emily Cratchit returns home to gaze gratefully through the window at her family inside, gathered around the table, this moment echoes Scrooge looking in on the Cratchits through the window in Scrooge, the most famous and acclaimed film-adaptation of A Christmas Carol.

Episode 19: The picture that Bumble hangs in the workhouse is of Josiah Bounderby, one of the major characters in Hard Times. One of the school trustees is Mrs Tisher, a character from The Mystery of Edwin Drood. Amelia Havisham gazes at her wedding dress in the mirror—the same dress she will remain in throughout Great Expectations, in a mad, obsessive reminder of Compeyson's betrayal of her; one day, the dress catches fire, Miss Havisham suffers severe burns, and she dies some weeks later.

Episode 20: In an echo of his line in Episode 1, Silas Wegg tells his barmaid, "Daisy, up and get the empties from Mister Pickwick" (of The Pickwick Papers). In reply to Daisy's farewell to him in the tavern, Scrooge mutters, "Humbug," his trademark utterance; Marley's ghost whispers "Ebenezer," as in A Christmas Carol.

== Broadcast ==
Internationally, the series premiered in Australia on BBC First on 7 February 2016, but it was broadcast as 13 45-minute episodes in contrast to the 20 half-hour-long instalments broadcast in the UK.

It also premiered in The Netherlands on BBC First on 5 January 2016.

In Finland the series was broadcast on YLE as ten one-hour episodes beginning 2 December 2016.

In Norway, the series was broadcast on NRK as ten one-hour episodes beginning 26 December 2017.

In Sweden, the series was broadcast on SVT as ten one-hour episodes beginning 2 December 2017.

== Critical reception ==
Reviewing the first episodes in The Guardian Sam Wollaston noted its jumble of characters and events: "Tony Jordan has taken a whole bunch of Dickens characters from their novels and put them into something else. […]. It's like EastEnders meets A Christmas Carol meets Great Expectations meets Oliver Twist meets Bleak House meets Our Mutual Friend, and I've certainly missed some out. Meets Agatha Christie, too, because here's another body – Marley's this time – coshed over the head and left lying in the snow". He added, "The set is beautiful, and there are showy Dickensian performances from a starry cast. It's clever, certainly, and must have been a labour of love, unpicking all these people from their works, weaving them into something else." But he had a problem "with the whole exercise – starting with the characters, someone else's, and then figuring out what they're going to be doing. Are things not better if they grow together, as one, characters, stories, style, themes etc? And the problem with these particular characters is that the new thing is never going to be as good as the thing they came from". He concluded, "And I'm having real problems figuring out what the bleedin' 'ell is going on. It's clear like the fog down by the dock where Fagin lives. It – the fog – does lift a bit; by the end of the second episode (of 20! that’s a big ask), I'm a bit less fuddled. And it begins to pick up momentum of its own. But I wonder how many of the viewers who set off will get this far".

Writing in The Daily Telegraph, Michael Hogan was more impressed, giving the opening two episodes a full five stars: "Jordan put a pacy, playful and subtly sudsy new spin on much-loved material. Its debut double bill left me saying, 'Please, sir, I want some more'". He observed, "Dickensian will unfold in 20 half-hour instalments, its format reminiscent of the BBC's landmark serialization of Bleak House a decade ago. Such soap-style scheduling isn't far removed from how Dickens told his original stories, published in short instalments with cliffhanger endings, the multiple plot threads drawn inexorably together over time". Hogan concluded, "Jordan is a Dickens super-fan and his love of the great man's works seeped through every line of the sparkling script. This 200-year-old treat in 21st-century wrapping was an ingeniously conceived, handsomely crafted gift - signed, with love, from Jordan and Dickens. Consider this my thank-you letter".

In The Independent on Sunday, Amy Burns found the opening episodes to be a "brilliant BBC re-imagining" and a "clever and compelling Dickens mash-up". She praised Stephen Rea for playing Inspector Bucket "utterly faultlessly", adding, "His mannerisms and vocal intonation were absolutely spot-on and the script was excellent".

For Radio Times' Ben Dowell, "the first and most obvious question to ask is this: they may have the same names and look like they are described in the books, but who are these people? Can they really be said to be Dickens characters? The great Victorian novelist invented these richly-drawn characters to fit into the novels he wrote. He was a storyteller, first and foremost, someone who wrote episodic narratives driven by the unstoppable force of his ingeniously-crafted plots. He populated his books with amazing characters, of course, but tearing them away from their stories is to essentially denude them of their essential life and being". He compared the opening episodes to "a weird Doctor Who episode where the Doctor enters some kind of weird alien dream world populated by characters formed from half-remembered dreams of his reading of English Victorian literature". Conceding that "Jordan has also rather cleverly managed to fashion a whodunit plot out of the death of Marley", Dowell decided, "if I am honest I am not sure I will be hanging around to find out more. This is fast-paced, well written soapy drama. But it's also, for me, a messy pudding that is – but really isn't – Dickens".
