= The Crossing Sweeper =

Painting by William Powell Frith

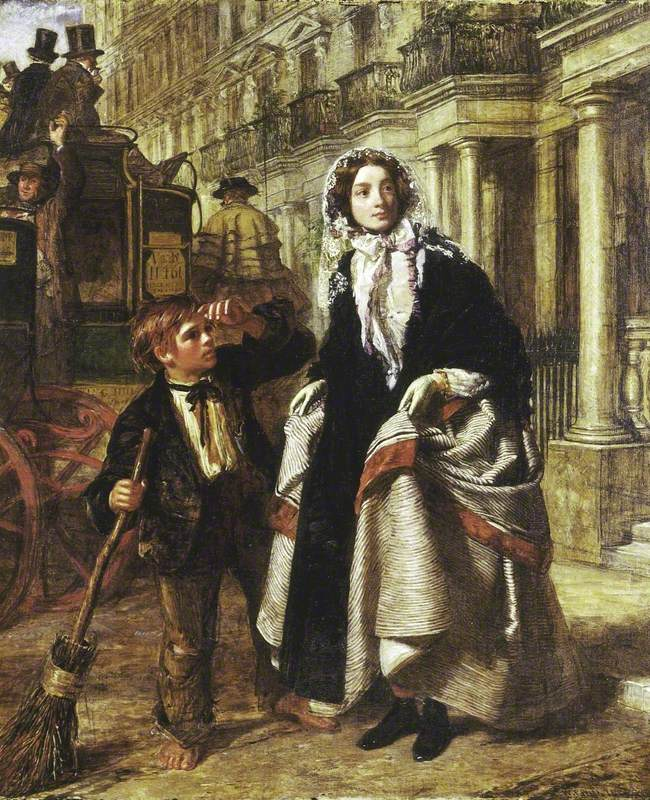
- Artist: William Powell Frith
- Year: 1858
- Medium: oil on canvas
- Dimensions: 43 cm × 45.5 cm (17 in × 17.9 in)
- Location: Museum of London, London

The Crossing Sweeper is an 1858 painting by the English painter William Powell Frith which has been described as breaking "new ground in its description of the collision of wealth and poverty on a London street." Frith later painted several versions of the same subject, updating the fashions.

== Subject ==
The painting depicts a crossing sweeper offering his services to a young woman who is looking out for a gap in traffic to cross the road. Crossing sweepers offered to sweep the streets in front of wealthy-looking pedestrians in the hope of a tip. The roads at that time were often smeared with horse dung because of the prevalence of horse-drawn vehicles. The woman has already lifted her dress to avoid its becoming soiled as she crosses.

The sweepers were often regarded as nuisances who were little more than beggars. The woman in the painting may be pointedly trying to ignore the boy. This was a common theme in commentary on sweepers. An 1853 Punch cartoon entitled "the crossing sweeper nuisance" depicted a hapless middle-class man surrounded by importunate boys holding out their hands for money. In an 1858 issue of Building News similarly negative sentiments were expressed of "those juvenile highwaymen who, broom in hand, take possessions of our crossings and level black mail upon the public in general, and timid females in particular."

Frith's sweeper is ostentatiously deferential, while also pushing close to the woman, setting extremes of poverty and wealth up against one another, a theme the artist explored in other works such as Poverty and Wealth, For Better, For Worse and The Derby Day.

== Versions ==
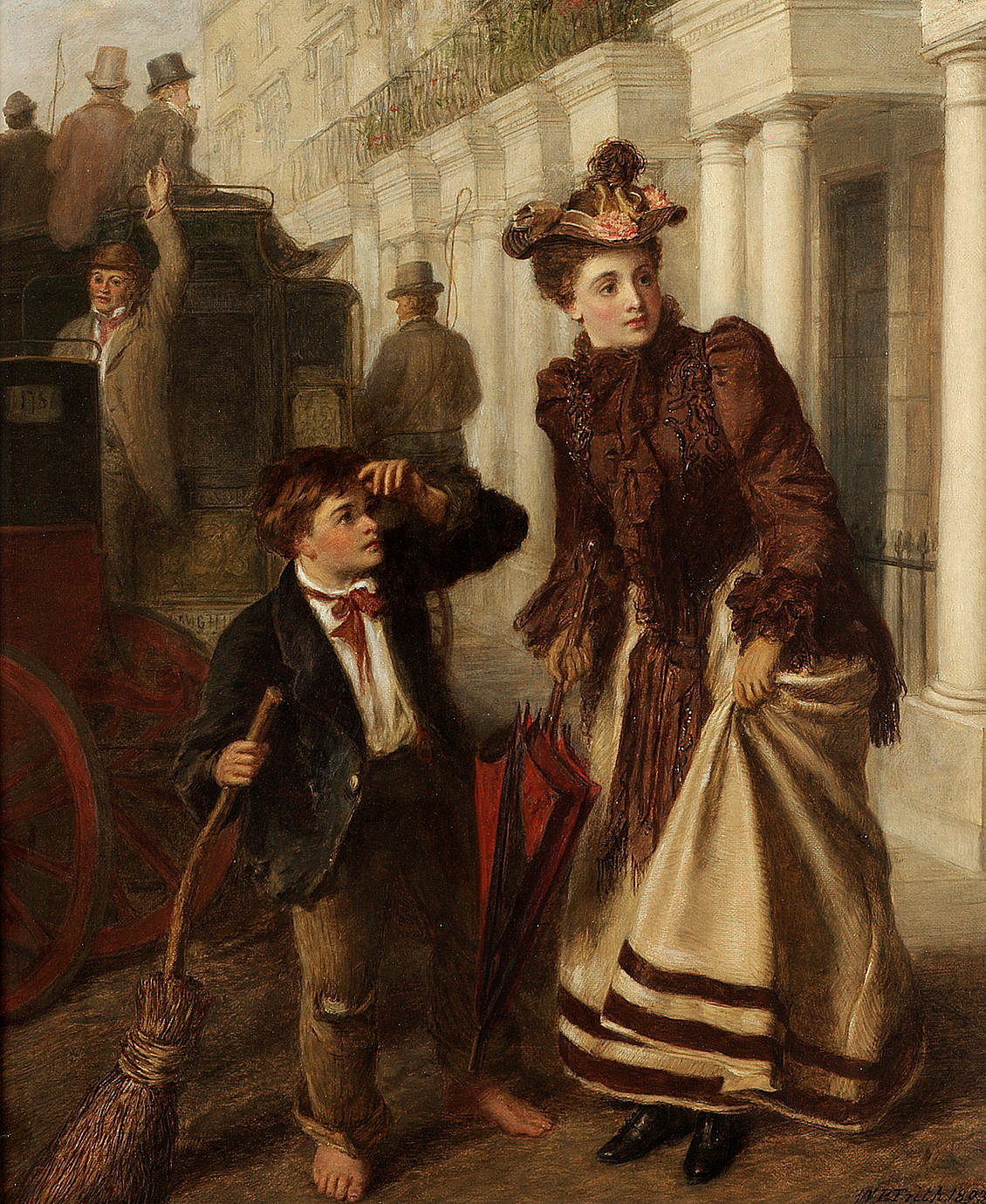
A version with updated fashions

The 1858 painting is in the Museum of London; it was also reproduced in the same year as an engraving, becoming a well-known image.

Frith created several copies in the 1890s, at a time in his career when much of his output comprised variations on his famous works. An 1893 version covers the brief glimpse of red stocking seen in the original with a lace undergarment. Another version from the same year updates the image by depicting the woman wearing the fashions of the 1890s.
