= Diana Fairfax =

Australian-British stage and screen actress

Diana Vida Jean Fairfax (19 December 1927 – 28 January 2019) was an Australian-born British actress.

Born in Melbourne, Victoria, Australia, in 1945 she sailed on the SS Stratheden from Sydney to Southampton, arriving there on 3 December 1945, aged 17. She made her career in England.

In 1950, Fairfax played Daisy Harding in a touring stage production of School for Spinsters by Roland Pertwee, with The Stage noting her "excellent performance".

An early lead role on television came in January 1958, in an Armchair Theatre production of The Shining Hour, opposite Peter Wyngarde. That same year she also played Lady Castlemaine/Barbara Palmer in eleven episodes of the BBC serial The Diary of Samuel Pepys. She went on to star as Esther Summerson in Bleak House (1959).

In 1960, Fairfax played the title role in Emma, a live BBC television serial in six parts, based on Jane Austen's Emma, directed by Campbell Logan.

She played Lady Verney in Moll Flanders (1975), Mrs Brown in Just William (1977), and Emily Warbeck in Love in a Cold Climate (1980).

In August and September 1987, Fairfax played Lucetta in The Two Gentlemen of Verona at the Regent's Park Open Air Theatre.

== Personal life ==
In 1958, at Marylebone, Fairfax married the actor Derek Godfrey. They had two daughters, born in 1962 and 1966.
