= Law-writer =

Copyiers of legal documents before mechanical copiers

A Law-writer (or Law writer) is an obsolete term for a tradesman who made hand written fair copies of legal documents before the advent of mechanical typewriters and document copiers. They qualified for the trade by being apprenticed to a master for a period. They were usually employed by law-stationers or offered their services by putting up notices at law courts. The occupation survived to the early twentieth century.

Charles Dickens describes the activities of law-writers and law-stationers in his novel Bleak House drawing on his acquaintance with actual practitioners.
