= Bleak House (1985 serial) =

- DVD cover
- Genre: Period drama
- Starring: Diana Rigg; Denholm Elliott; Peter Vaughan; T. P. McKenna; Philip Franks; Suzanne Burden
- Composer: Geoffrey Burgon
- Country of origin: United Kingdom
- Original language: English
- No. of series: 1
- No. of episodes: 8

Production
- Cinematography: Kenneth MacMillan
- Running time: 52 minutes
- Production company: BBC Television

Original release
- Network: BBC2
- Release: 10 April – 29 May 1985

Related
- Bleak House (1959); Bleak House (2005)

Bleak House is a BBC television drama first broadcast in 1985. The serial was adapted by Arthur Hopcraft from the Charles Dickens novel Bleak House (1853).

The series was the second adaptation of Bleak House by the BBC (the first being in 1959). It ran for eight episodes and starred Diana Rigg as Lady Dedlock, with Denholm Elliott in the role of John Jarndyce.

In the United States, the series ran under the Masterpiece Theatre series umbrella.

A notable plot omission in this version is the story of Caddy Jellyby and the Turveydrop family.

As opposed to the standard of videotape for studio-based scenes and film for location-based scenes, the series was shot entirely on 16 mm colour film.

== Cast ==
- Robin Bailey as Sir Leicester Dedlock
- Suzanne Burden as Esther Summerson
- Denholm Elliott as John Jarndyce
- Philip Franks as Richard Carstone
- Lucy Hornak as Ada Clare
- T. P. McKenna as Harold Skimpole
- Chris Pitt as Jo
- Diana Rigg as Lady Dedlock
- Sylvia Coleridge as Miss Flite
- Graham Crowden as Lord Chancellor
- Peter Vaughan as Tulkinghorn
- Bernard Hepton as Krook
- Jonathan Moore as William Guppy
- Frank Windsor as Gridley
- Brian Deacon as Allan Woodcourt
- Robert Urquhart as Laurence Boythorn
- Sam Kelly as Mr. Snagsby
- Dave King as Sergeant George
- Pamela Merrick as Hortense
- Ian Hogg as Inspector Bucket
- Charlie Drake as Smallweed
- Eileen Davies as Judy Smallweed
- Donald Sumpter as 'Nemo'
- Gabrielle Daye as Mrs. Rouncewell
- Harry Jones as Phil Squod
- Colin Jeavons as Vholes
- Cathy Murphy as Housemaid
- Arthur Hewlett as Waggoner
- Anne Reid as Mrs. Bagnet
- Anthony Roye as Kenge
- George Sewell as Ironmaster Rouncewell
- Guy Standeven as Bagnet
- Stella Tanner as Mrs. Chadband
- Malcolm Terris as Reverend Chadband
- Paul Venables as Wat Rouncewell
- John Oliver as Felix Pardiggle
- Bob Goody - Barrister
- Cyril Appleton - Second Barrister
- Keith James as Egbert Pardiggle

== See also ==
- Bleak House
- Bleak House (1959 serial)
- Bleak House (2005 serial)
