= Crossing sweeper =

Street cleaner

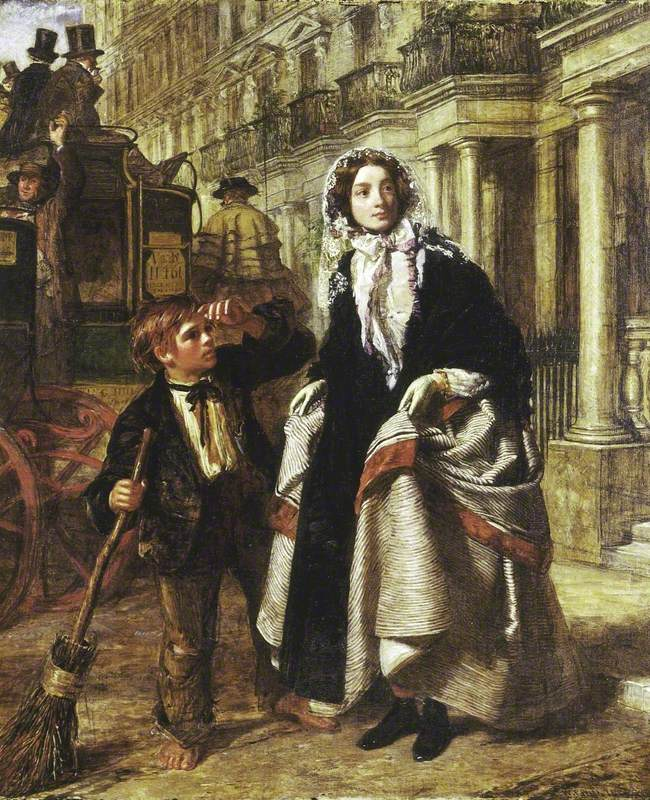
The Crossing Sweeper by William Powell Frith, 1858.

A crossing sweeper was a person working as a street sweeper who would sweep a path ahead of people crossing dirty urban streets in exchange for a gratuity. This practice was an informal occupation among the urban poor, primarily during the 19th century. It was the focus of fairly intense study and commentary, and attitudes toward the presence of crossing sweepers on city streets varied greatly among urban residents, ranging from appreciation for their work to feelings that they were a public nuisance. Crossing sweepers also found their way into 19th-century fiction and artwork, including a novel by Charles Dickens and a popular painting by William Powell Frith.

== Description ==
Crossing sweepers were a common sight on the streets of large cities during much of the 19th century. The predominance of horse-drawn vehicles—and the general uncleanliness of urban streets—entailed certain difficulties in crossing intersections. For example, the long dresses of many elite women might easily be soiled by horse droppings (among other forms of refuse). Crossing sweepers, by sweeping the pavement ahead of a person crossing the street and creating a path that was referred to as a "broom walk," thus offered a service, particularly to the more affluent.

In his multi-volume work London Labour and the London Poor (published 1851), English journalist Henry Mayhew referred to mid-19th-century crossing-sweeping as "one of those occupations which are resorted to as an excuse for begging..." Crossing sweeping was likely a "last chance" source of income for many and had the advantage of requiring little or no startup capital. Those who worked as sweepers were able to ask for money from passersby without necessarily being viewed solely as beggars, and sweepers who regularly worked the same area likely were viewed more sympathetically by those who lived in the neighborhood, leading at times to more formal "weekly allowances." Crossing sweepers may have earned a more substantial income in the early 19th century, prior to the arrival of the horse-drawn omnibus, but by the mid-19th century the returns were generally small, with as little as a shilling being considered a "good day's earnings" even for the relatively privileged sweepers on London's main thoroughfares.

Among those who worked as crossing sweepers were the elderly and the disabled or, as one 19th-century observer put it, "cripples, and old men and women, shrivelled like dry wrinkled apples, who are just strong enough to give the public that real convenience..."

Children also worked as crossing sweepers, and the occupation was regularly portrayed in the art and literature of the day as the work of an impoverished child, usually a boy. Children sweepers would sometimes work individually and at other times in groups. In the latter situation there was often a designated leader—sometimes styled as "king"—and the money was generally shared. Groups of young crossing sweepers could be territorial and would fight others to maintain control of their "turf" if necessary. In mid-19th-century New York City, crossing-sweeping was common among young girls, who had even fewer options for earning an income than did lower-class boys (with occasional prostitution being a notable exception).

Some observers chronicled the "types" of crossing sweepers at great length. A piece in Chambers's Edinburgh Journal in 1852 discussed seven categories of sweepers found on the streets of London—Professional Sweeper; Morning Sweeper; Occasional Sweeper; Sunday Sweeper; deformed, maimed, and crippled sweepers; and Female Sweepers—who plied their trade with varying degrees of skill, effort, and financial success. Henry Mayhew differentiated between "casual" and "regular" crossing sweepers, with the former only working certain days of the week and/or varying the location at which they worked while the latter swept at one particular corner almost every day. In London Labour and the London Poor Mayhew discussed "Able-bodied" (divided into "male," "female," and "Irish"), "Afflicted or crippled," and "Juvenile" crossing sweepers, offering in-depth observations from and about actual sweepers with whom he spoke.

== Contemporaneous attitudes ==
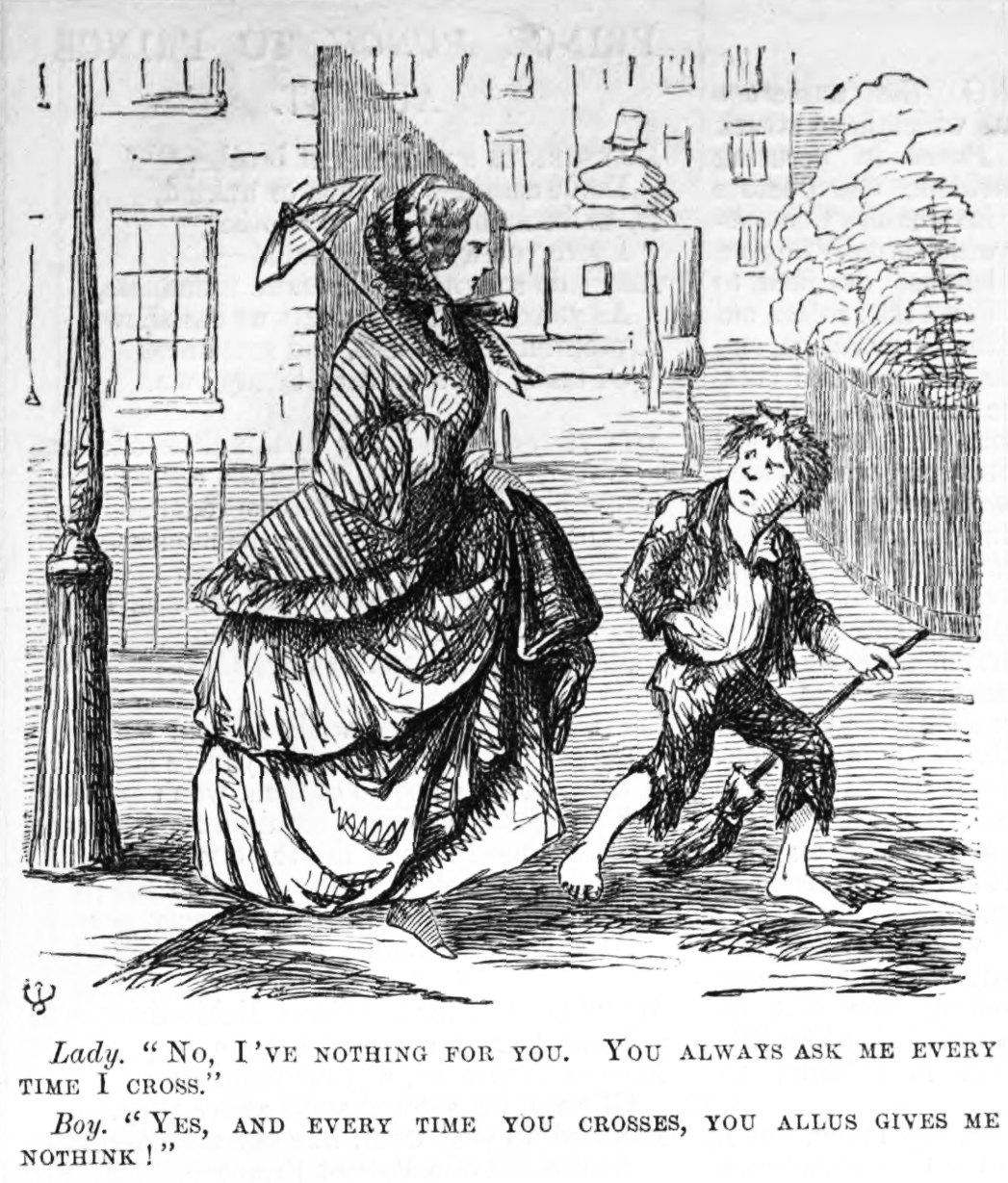
1853 cartoon in the British magazine Punch showing a crossing sweeper demanding (and being refused) payment from a well-to-do woman.

City residents had mixed reactions to crossing sweepers and their presence on urban streets. Richard Rowe viewed crossing-sweeping as "little better than a make-believe of work, as a pretext for begging, either directly or by suggestion." Rowe did not see a problem with "alms-giving" to elderly or disabled crossing sweepers, but overall wanted to see their ranks "thinned considerably – viz., by the elimination of the adults who are able, and the young who might be trained to do something better..." A writer in an 1858 issue of Building News expressed a similarly negative sentiment when referring to "those juvenile highwayman who, broom in hand, take possessions of our crossings and level black mail upon the public in general, and timid females in particular."

Others viewed crossing sweepers as legitimate workers who provided a useful service and thus differentiated themselves from more nefarious persons encountered in the streets. An 1864 comment in The Art Journal noted that crossing sweepers "are of a different class from the pickpocket and vagrant classes who prowl about to make what prizes fall within their reach." In 1882 a self-described "Lady Pedestrian" wrote the editors of The New York Times lamenting recent prohibitions on street sweepers:

A few years ago there were many children and men who turned out immediately after a snow-fall, and were daily to be met during the thaw, brushing the crossings as clean as they could. For this small service many foot passengers gladly gave a few small coins, regarding the sweepers not as beggars or vagrants, but as laborers, whose hard and disagreeable work enabled well-shod people to pass neatly on their way. There has, however, been a prohibition of street sweepers...The result is that on Wednesday last...there was not one crossing on which the snow and mud did not come full two inches above the sole of a thick gaiter, and it was entirely impossible to find a single crossing to the opposite side of the avenue which could be trod without sinking to the ankle...let us have the volunteer sweepers back for the comfort of a LADY PEDESTRIAN.

Some older crossing sweepers suffered abuse from their fellow citizens, at times from children. Rowe described one London man, called "Parson," who was regularly "tormented" by youths of the street. However "the police and the omnibus-men, the newsvendors and the miscellaneous loungers hanging about the inn in front of which Parson's crossing, or rather crossings, stretched, did their best to protect the old fellow, and soundly cuffed his persecutors when they chanced to run their way..."

In his detailed account of the lives and work of crossing sweepers, Henry Mayhew concluded that, "taken as a class, crossing-sweepers are among the most honest of the London poor. They all tell you that, without a good character and 'the respect of the neighborhood,' there is not a living to be got out of the broom."

== In literature and art ==
The occupation of crossing sweeper received perhaps its most famous literary treatment in Charles Dickens' novel Bleak House with the character of Jo, a homeless boy who "fights it out at his crossing among the mud and wheels, the horses, whips, and umbrellas, and gets but a scanty sum..." Jo has been characterized as "one of the most significant figures" in the novel and as a way for Dickens to address juvenile vagrancy, which was seen as a serious social problem at the time.

Dickens described Jo as:

not a genuine foreign-grown savage; he is the ordinary home-made article. Dirty, ugly, disagreeable to all the senses, in body a common creature of the common streets, only in soul a heathen. Homely filth begrimes him, homely parasites devour him, homely sores are in him, homely rags are on him; native ignorance, the growth of English soil and climate, sinks his immortal nature lower than the beasts that perish.

One scholar characterized Jo as being "depicted as almost completely bereft of agency, a child swept along by circumstances, made merely to 'move on,'" a member of "a nation that fails to recognize him as one of its citizens." Jo was a popular character among readers of the novel which no doubt in part led to the production of a stage adaptation entitled Bleak House; or Poor 'Jo. A drama in four acts.

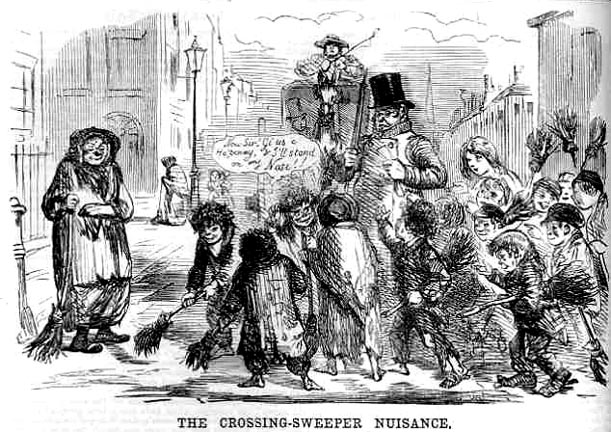
1856 cartoon from Punch showing "the crossing sweeper nuisance."

A real fourteen-year-old youth named George Ruby who was called to testify at the Guildhall in 1850 is often thought to have been Dickens' inspiration for Jo (who, in the novel, was called to testify before an inquest). While not disagreeing with that assessment, Edwin M. Eigner and Joseph I. Fradin have argued that an earlier, literary precedent comes from Edward Bulwer-Lytton's 1846 novel Lucretia, which also featured a young male crossing sweeper, this one named Beck. Eigner and Fradin suggest that both Jo and Beck are intensely symbolic figures for the two novelists, "the representative orphan of an entire society."

An even earlier literary portrayal can be found in William Makepeace Thackeray's 1838 story, "Miss Shum's Husband," in which the apparently respectable husband actually makes his money as a crossing sweeper, to the horror of his servant Yellowplush.

Crossing sweepers were also regularly portrayed in the visual arts, and Mark Bills argues that "from the late eighteenth century, prints of crossing sweepers invariably had a satirical purpose." Robert Sayer, William Marshall Craig, and Thomas Rowlandson all created prints of crossing sweepers in the late 18th century or early 19th century. In the 1850s Punch magazine frequently printed satirical images of crossing sweepers, depicting "each one [as] a nuisance of modern life." An 1856 article in the magazine entitled "The Crossing Sweeper Nuisance" offered nineteen humorous descriptions of different sweepers, including (invented) tales of woe designed to elicit sympathy, for example "a Crimean soldier, who was flogged and dismissed the army for protecting a female from the insults of his commanding officer."

A more sympathetic portrayal was William Powell Frith's 1856 painting The Crossing Sweeper (pictured at the top of this article), the popularity of which was evinced by a market for painted and engraved replicas of the image. Frith was a friend of Dickens and had painted versions of his characters before, though his model for The Crossing Sweeper was a real boy. According to Frith's autobiography, the crossing sweeper who modelled for his painting attempted to steal Frith's gold pocket watch when the artist went out for lunch.

Beginning in 1876 the British actress, Jennie Lee, made a career out of playing Jo, the crossing-sweeper, in the popular play Jo, a melodrama John Pringle Burnett based on Bleak House.

== See also ==
- List of obsolete occupations
- Street sweeper
- Squeegee man
