= Suzanne Burden =

British actress

Suzanne Burden (born 1958) is a British actress.

A graduate of RADA, she has appeared on television, and occasionally in films, since the early 1980s. She gained attention as Esther Summerson in Bleak House (1985). In 1989, she played Patricia Matthews in Poirot (episode "The Third Floor Flat"), and Joyce Blount in Campion (episode "Police at the Funeral"). Her leading roles have included You, Me and It (1993), A Mind to Murder (1995), The Vet (1995–96), the children's series Microsoap (1998–2000). She appeared as Sarah in the sitcom Fear, Stress and Anger (2007). In Midsomer Murders, she played Rebecca Plunkett in the episode "A Talent for Life" (2003) then Zukie Richardson in the episode "The Great and the Good" (2009).

Burden has also appeared on stage. At the Chichester Festival Theatre, in the 2006 season, she played Lydia Cruttwell in Terence Rattigan's In Praise of Love and the following year, she was Maria in Twelfth Night and Lady Macduff in Macbeth. At the Arcola Theatre, London, in 2009, she played Mrs Alving in Ibsen's Ghosts. Burden appeared in Black Mirror: Bandersnatch, released on Netflix on 28 December 2018.

Burden has also co-starred in several radio dramas for BBC, along with Bill Nighy, in Simon Brett's comedic murder mystery series Charles Paris. She plays his "semi-detached" wife, Frances.
