= Bleak House (1920 film) =

1920 British film by Maurice Elvey

- Directed by: Maurice Elvey
- Written by: William J. Elliott
- Based on: Bleak House by Charles Dickens'
- Starring: Constance Collier; Berta Gellardi; Helen Haye; Clifford Heatherley
- Production company: Ideal Film Company
- Distributed by: Ideal Film Company
- Release date: 15 January 1920
- Country: United Kingdom
- Language: English

Bleak House is a 1920 British silent drama film directed by Maurice Elvey and starring Constance Collier, Berta Gellardi, and Helen Haye. An adaptation of Charles Dickens' 1853 novel of the same name, it was one of many silent-film versions of Dickens' stories.

== Cast ==
- Constance Collier - Lady Dedlock
- Berta Gellardi - Esther Summerson
- Helen Haye - Miss Barbay
- E. Vivian Reynolds - Tulkinghorne
- Norman Page - Guppy
- Clifford Heatherley - Bucket
- Ion Swinley - Captain Hawdon
- A. Harding Steerman - Sir Leicester Dedlock
- Anthony St. John - Jo
- Teddy Arundell - George
- Beatrix Templeton - Rachel
