= Bleak House =

1852–1853 novel by Charles Dickens

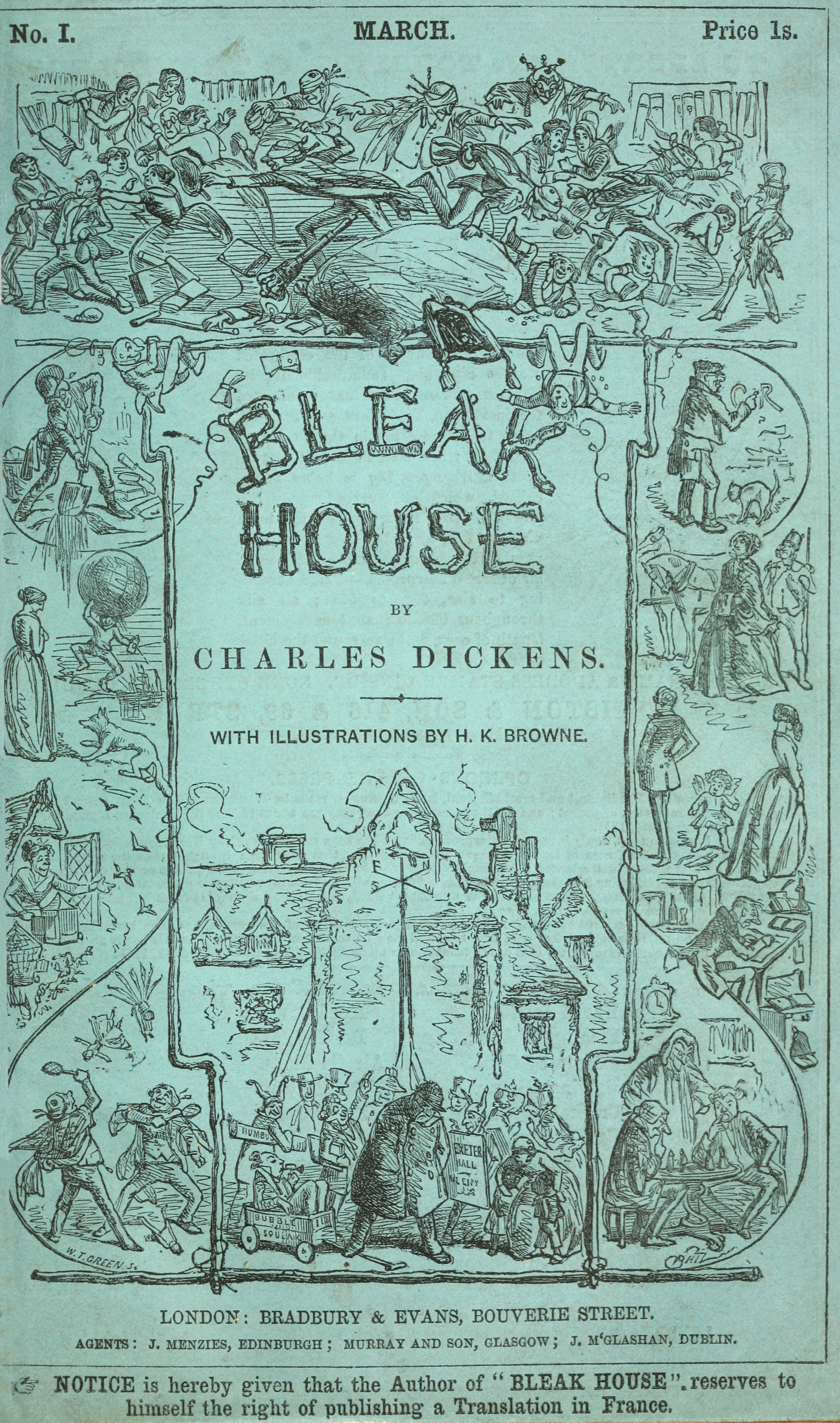
- Cover of first serial, March 1852
- Author: Charles Dickens
- Illustrator: Hablot Knight Browne (Phiz)
- Cover artist: Hablot Knight Browne (Phiz)
- Language: English
- Genre: Novel
- Published: Serialised: 12 March 1852 – 12 September 1853; Book: 12 September 1853
- Publisher: Bradbury & Evans
- Publication place: England
- Preceded by: David Copperfield
- Followed by: A Child's History of England

Bleak House is a novel by the English author Charles Dickens, first published as a 20-episode serial between 12 March 1852 and 12 September 1853. The novel has many characters and several subplots, and is told partly by the novel's heroine, Esther Summerson, and partly by an omniscient narrator. At the centre of Bleak House is a long-running legal case in the Court of Chancery, Jarndyce and Jarndyce, which comes about because a testator has written several conflicting wills. In a preface to the 1853 first edition, Dickens said there were many actual precedents for his fictional case. One such was probably Thellusson v Woodford, in which a will read in 1797 was contested and not determined until 1859. Though many in the legal profession criticised Dickens's satire as exaggerated, Bleak House helped support a judicial reform movement that culminated in the enactment of legal reform in the 1870s.

Some scholars debate when Bleak House is set. The English legal historian Sir William Holdsworth sets the action in 1827; however, reference to preparation for the building of a railway in Chapter LV suggests the 1830s. A work of Gothic fiction depicting London as a murky city swathed in fog, Bleak House is credited with introducing urban fog to the novel, which would become a frequent characteristic of urban Gothic literature and film. Released in 1901, the Bleak House-inspired The Death of Poor Joe is the earliest filmed adaptation of a Dickens work.

== Synopsis ==
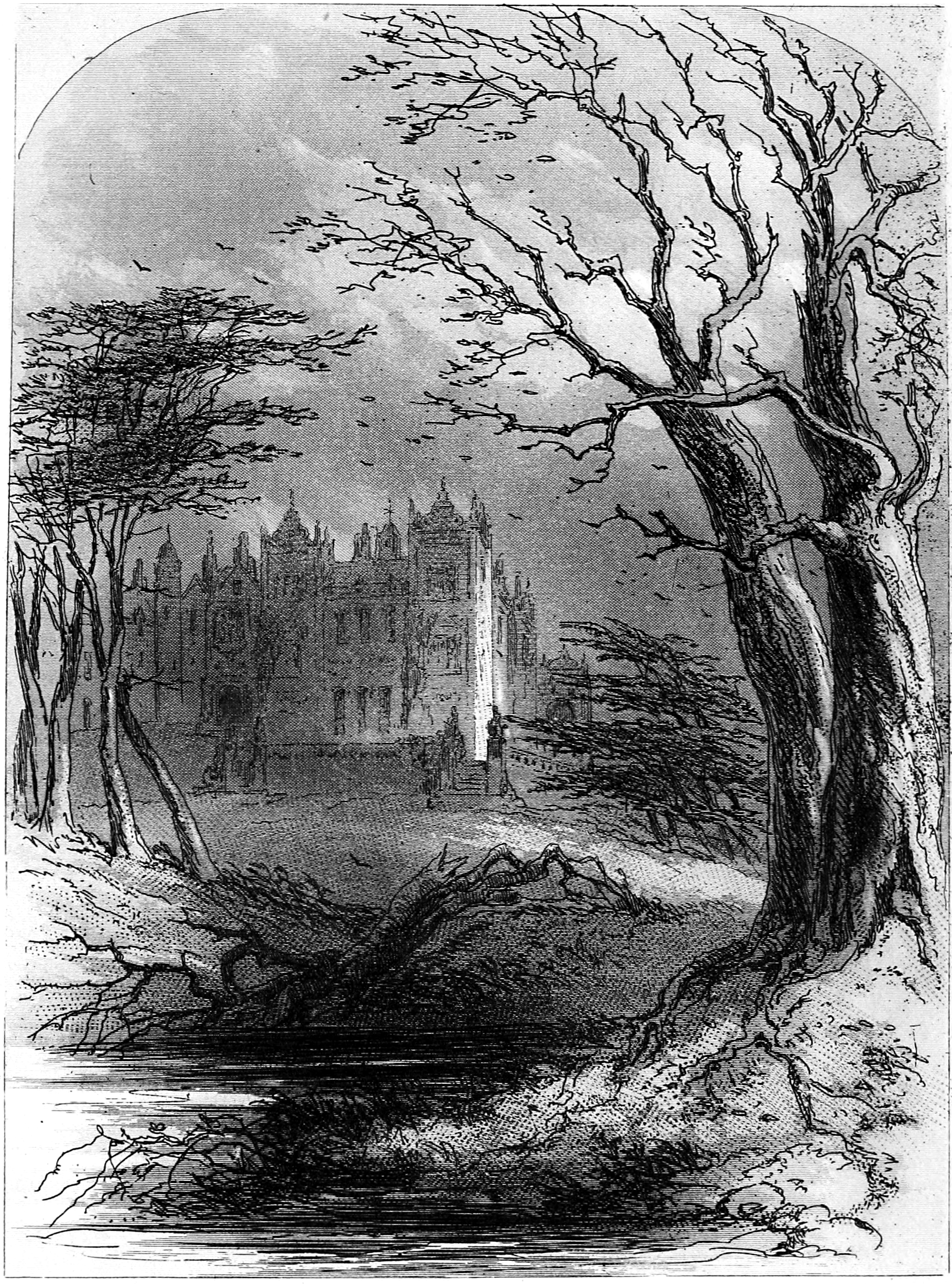
Frontispiece, Chesney Wold, home of Sir Leicester Dedlock

Jarndyce and Jarndyce is an interminable probate case in the Court of Chancery concerning two or more wills and their beneficiaries. Lady Honoria Dedlock, the beneficiary of one of the wills, lives with her husband, Sir Leicester Dedlock, at his estate at Chesney Wold. While listening to the reading by Mr Tulkinghorn, the family solicitor, of an affidavit, Lady Dedlock recognises the handwriting on the copy. The sight affects her so much she almost faints, which Mr Tulkinghorn notices and investigates. He traces the copyist, a pauper known only as "Nemo", in London. Nemo has recently died, and the only person to identify him is a street-sweeper, a poor homeless boy named Jo, who lives in a particularly grim and poverty-stricken part of the city known as Tom-All-Alone's.

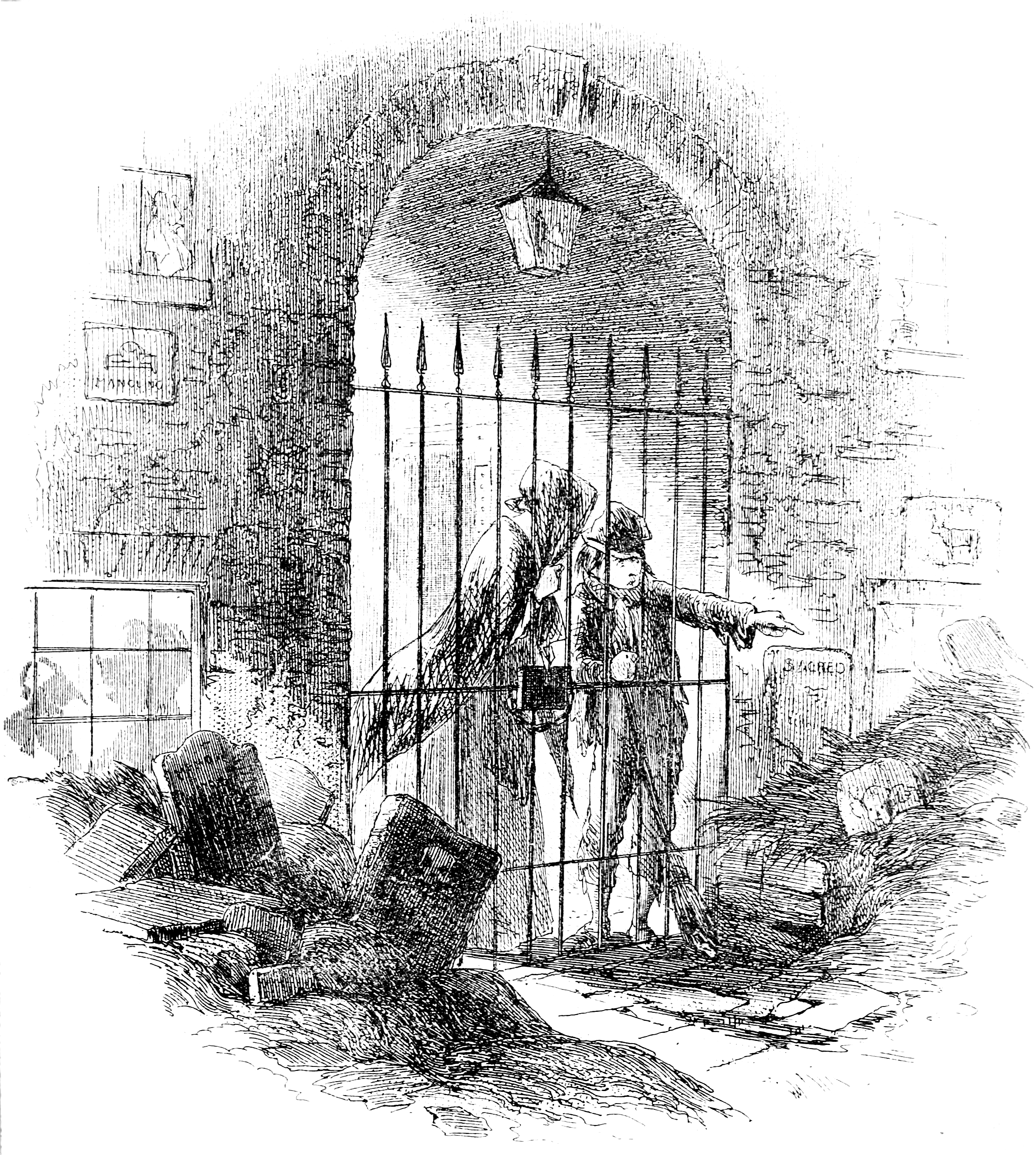
Consecrated ground

Esther Summerson is raised by the harsh Miss Barbary, who tells her, "Your mother, Esther, is your disgrace, and you were hers." After Miss Barbary dies, John Jarndyce becomes Esther's guardian and assigns "Conversation" Kenge, a Chancery lawyer, to take charge of her future. After attending school for six years, Esther moves in with Jarndyce at his home, Bleak House. Jarndyce simultaneously assumes custody of two other wards, his cousins Richard Carstone and Ada Clare. They are beneficiaries in one of the wills at issue in Jarndyce and Jarndyce; their guardian is a beneficiary under another will, and the two wills conflict.

Richard and Ada soon fall in love, but though Jarndyce does not oppose the match, he stipulates that Richard must first choose a profession. Richard first tries a career in medicine, and Esther meets Allan Woodcourt, a physician, at the house of Richard's tutor. When Richard mentions the prospect of gaining from the resolution of Jarndyce and Jarndyce, Jarndyce beseeches him never to put faith in what he calls "the family curse." Richard decides to change his career to law, then later switches again and spends the remainder of his funds to buy a commission as a military officer.

Lady Dedlock—disguised as her maid, Mademoiselle Hortense—pays Jo to take her to Nemo's grave. Meanwhile, Mr Tulkinghorn is concerned Lady Dedlock has a secret which could threaten the interests of Sir Leicester and watches her constantly, even enlisting the real Hortense to spy on her. He also enlists Inspector Bucket to run Jo out of town, to eliminate anything that might connect Nemo to the Dedlocks. Esther sees Lady Dedlock at church and later talks with her at Chesney Wold.

Lady Dedlock discovers that Esther is her own child: unknown to Sir Leicester, before she married, Honoria had had a lover, Captain Hawdon (Nemo), and bore a daughter by him, who she had believed was dead. The daughter, Esther, was brought up by Honoria's sister, Miss Barbary. Esther becomes ill (possibly with smallpox, since it severely disfigures her) from Jo. Lady Dedlock waits until she has recovered before telling her the truth. Though the two women are happy to be reunited, Lady Dedlock tells Esther they must never acknowledge their connection again.

Upon recovery, Esther finds that Richard, having failed at several professions, has ignored Jarndyce's advice and is trying to push Jarndyce and Jarndyce to conclusion in his and Ada's favour, and as a result has fallen out with Jarndyce. In the process, Richard loses all his money and declines in health. He and Ada have secretly married, and Ada is pregnant. Esther has her own romance when Mr Woodcourt returns to England, having survived a shipwreck, and he continues to seek her company despite her disfigurement. However, Esther has already agreed to marry her guardian, the much older Jarndyce.

Mr Tulkinghorn dismisses Hortense, who is no longer of any use to him. He tells Lady Dedlock he will soon reveal her secret to Sir Leicester. He returns to his chambers and is shot through the heart. Inspector Bucket initially suspects Lady Dedlock of the murder but later discovers Hortense's guilt.

Upon learning she is suspected of murder, Lady Dedlock flees her home, leaving a note apologising to Sir Leicester for her conduct. Inspector Bucket reveals the truth about Lady Dedlock's past to Sir Leicester. Following this, Sir Leicester discovers his wife's flight and suffers a catastrophic stroke, but he manages to communicate that he forgives his wife and wants her to return.

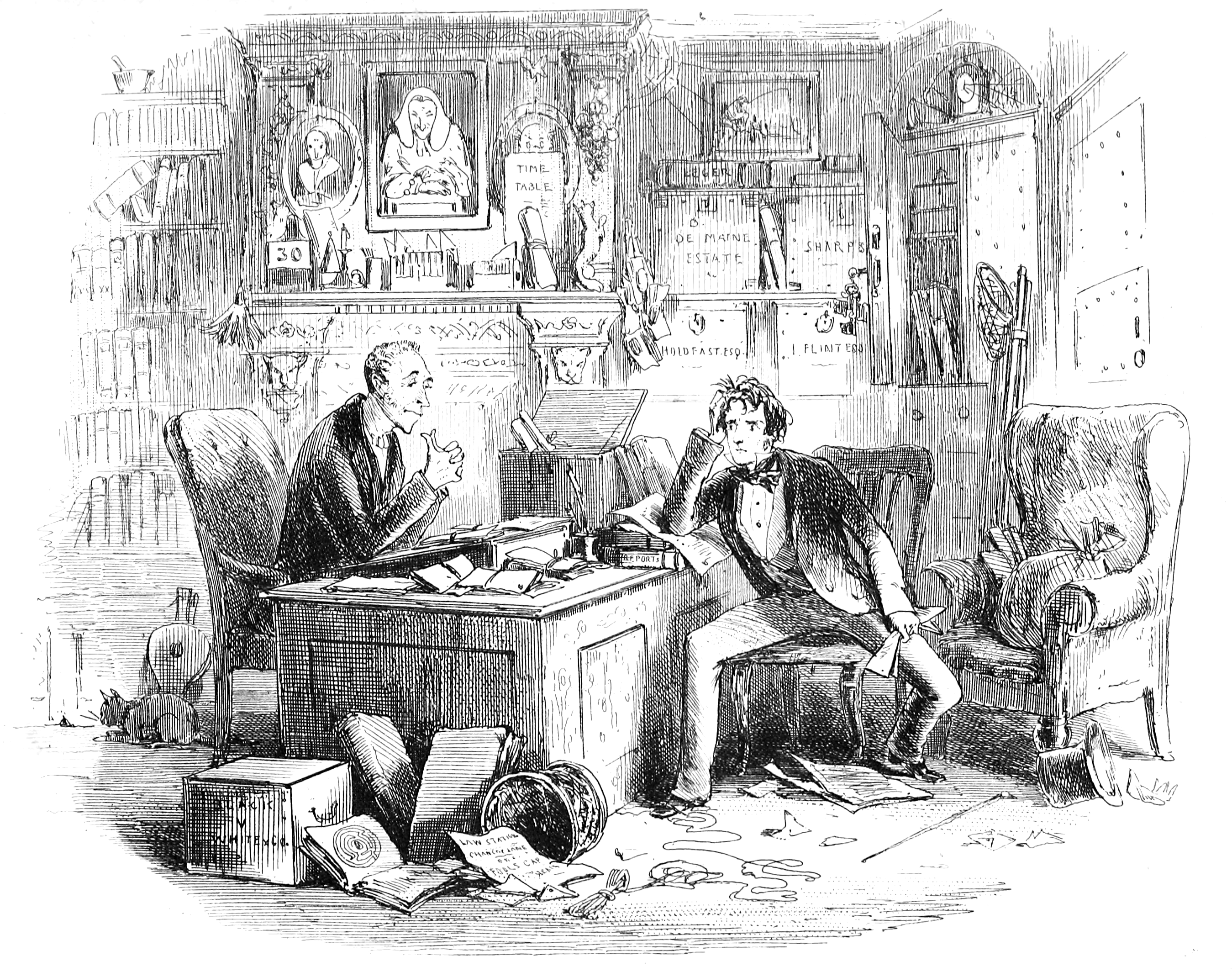
Attorney and Client

Inspector Bucket, who has previously investigated several matters related to Jarndyce and Jarndyce, accepts Sir Leicester's commission to find Lady Dedlock. He requests Esther's help to find her mother. Lady Dedlock has no way to know of her husband's forgiveness or that she has been cleared of suspicion, and she wanders the country in cold weather before dying at the cemetery of her former lover, Captain Hawdon. Esther and Inspector Bucket find her there.

Progress in Jarndyce and Jarndyce seems to take a turn for the better when a later will is found, which revokes all previous wills and leaves the bulk of the estate to Richard and Ada. Jarndyce cancels his engagement to Esther, who becomes engaged to Mr Woodcourt. They go to Chancery to find Richard. On their arrival, they learn that the case of Jarndyce and Jarndyce is finally over, because the costs of litigation have entirely consumed the estate. Richard collapses, and blood in his mouth makes it evident he is in the last stages of tuberculosis. He apologises to Jarndyce and dies. Jarndyce takes in Ada and her child, a boy whom she names Richard. Esther and Mr Woodcourt marry and live in a Yorkshire house which Jarndyce gives to them. The couple later raise two daughters.

Many of the novel's subplots focus on minor characters. One such subplot is the hard life and happy, though difficult, marriage of Caddy Jellyby and Prince Turveydrop. Another plot focuses on George Rouncewell's rediscovery of his family, and his reunion with his mother and brother.

== Characters ==
Although not a character, Jarndyce and Jarndyce is a vital part of the novel. It is believed to have been inspired by a number of real-life Chancery cases involving wills, including those of Thellusson v Woodford, Charles Day and William Jennens, and of Charlotte Smith's father-in-law, Richard Smith.

=== Major characters ===
- Esther Summerson is the heroine. She is Dickens's only female narrator. Esther is raised as an orphan by her godmother Miss Barbary, who is in fact her aunt. She does not know her parents' identity. Miss Barbary holds macabre vigils on Esther's birthday each year, telling her that her birth is no cause for celebration, because the girl is her mother's "disgrace". Because of her cruel upbringing she is self-effacing, self-deprecating and grateful for every trifle. The discovery of her true identity provides much of the drama in the book. Finally it is revealed that she is the illegitimate daughter of Lady Dedlock and Nemo, later learned to be Captain Hawdon.
- Honoria, Lady Dedlock is the haughty and beautiful mistress of Chesney Wold. The revelation of her past drives much of the plot. Before her marriage, Lady Dedlock had an affair with another man and bore his child. Her sister had told her at the time of the birth that the infant was stillborn. Years later, however, Lady Dedlock discovers that the child was born alive and is Esther Summerson. Because Lady Dedlock's reaction to the affidavit suggests that she harbours a secret predating her marriage, she has attracted the curiosity of Mr Tulkinghorn who feels bound by his ties to his client, Sir Leicester, to pry out this secret. At the end of the novel, Lady Dedlock dies, disgraced in her own mind and convinced that her husband could never forgive what she imagines to be her own moral failings.
- John Jarndyce is an unwilling party in Jarndyce and Jarndyce, guardian of Richard, Ada, and Esther, and owner of Bleak House. Vladimir Nabokov called him "one of the best and kindest human beings ever described in a novel". A wealthy man, he helps most of the other characters, motivated by a combination of goodness and guilt at the mischief and human misery caused by Jarndyce and Jarndyce, which he calls "the family curse". At first, it seems possible that he is Esther's father, but he makes clear he is her guardian shortly after she comes to live under his roof, explaining the letter he received asking him to take on that role a few years earlier. He falls in love with Esther and wishes to marry her, but he gives her up because she is in love with Mr Woodcourt.
- Richard Carstone is a ward of Chancery in Jarndyce and Jarndyce. Straightforward and likeable but irresponsible and inconstant, Richard falls under the spell of Jarndyce and Jarndyce. At the end of the book, just after Jarndyce and Jarndyce ends, he dies, worn out by his imprudence in trusting to the outcome of a Chancery suit.

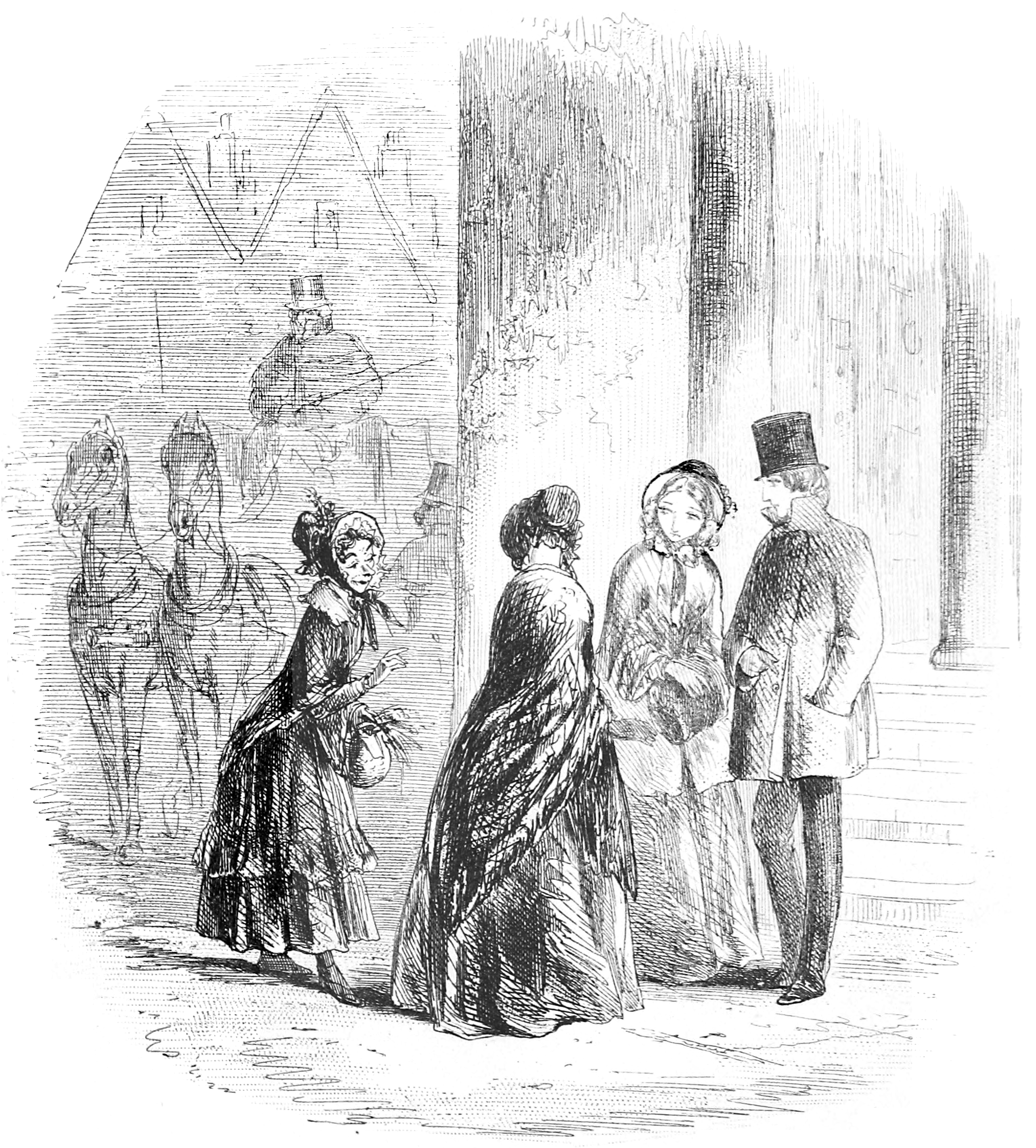
The little old lady

- Ada Clare is another young ward of Chancery in Jarndyce and Jarndyce. She falls in love with Richard Carstone, a distant cousin. They later marry in secret, and she has Richard's child. She is the dear friend of Esther's.
- Harold Skimpole is a friend of Jarndyce's "in the habit of sponging his friends" (Nuttall). He is irresponsible, selfish, amoral, and without remorse. He often refers to himself as "a child" and claims not to understand human relationships, circumstances, and society but actually understands them very well, as he demonstrates when he enlists Richard and Esther to pay off the bailiff who has arrested him on a writ of debt. He believes that Richard and Ada will be able to acquire credit based on their expectations in Jarndyce and Jarndyce and declares his intention to start "honouring" them by letting them pay some of his debts. This character is commonly regarded as a portrait of Leigh Hunt. Dickens wrote in a letter of 25 September 1853, 'I suppose he is the most exact portrait that was ever painted in words! ... It is an absolute reproduction of a real man'. A contemporary critic commented, 'I recognised Skimpole instantaneously; ... and so did every person whom I talked with about it who had ever had Leigh Hunt's acquaintance.'" G. K. Chesterton suggested that Dickens "may never once have had the unfriendly thought, 'Suppose Hunt behaved like a rascal!'; he may have only had the fanciful thought, 'Suppose a rascal behaved like Hunt!'"
- Lawrence Boythorn is an old friend of John Jarndyce's and a former soldier who speaks in superlatives, very loud and harsh but goodhearted. Boythorn was once engaged to and very much in love with a woman who left him without giving him any reason. She was Miss Barbary, who abandoned her former life and Boythorn when she took Esther from her sister. Boythorn is also a neighbour of Sir Leicester Dedlock's, with whom he is engaged in an epic tangle of lawsuits over a right-of-way across Boythorn's property that Sir Leicester asserts the legal right to close. He is thought to be based on the writer Walter Savage Landor.
- Sir Leicester Dedlock is a crusty baronet, much older than his wife. Dedlock is an unthinking conservative who regards the Jarndyce and Jarndyce lawsuit as a mark of distinction worthy of a man of his family lineage. On the other hand, he is shown as a loving and devoted husband towards Lady Dedlock, even after he learns about her secret.
- Mr Tulkinghorn is Sir Leicester's lawyer. He defers to his clients but enjoys and is driven by the power his control of their secrets gives him. He learns of Lady Dedlock's past and tries to control her conduct, in the name of preserving the reputation and good name of Sir Leicester. He is murdered, and his murder gives Dickens the chance to weave a detective plot into the closing chapters of the book.
- Mr Snagsby is the timid and hen-pecked proprietor of a law-stationery business who gave law-writer work to Nemo. Snagsby gets involved with Mr Tulkinghorn and Inspector Bucket's secrets. He is Jo's only friend and tends to give half-crowns to those for whom he feels sorry.
- Miss Flite is an elderly eccentric. Her family has been destroyed by a long-running Chancery case similar to Jarndyce and Jarndyce, and her obsessive fascination with Chancery veers between comedy and tragedy. She owns a large number of little birds, which she says will be released "on the day of judgment".
- Mr (William) Guppy is a law clerk at Kenge and Carboy. He becomes smitten with Esther and makes an offer of marriage, which she refuses. After Esther learns that Lady Dedlock is her mother, she asks Mr Guppy to stop investigating her past. He fears the meeting is to accept his offer of marriage, which he does not want to pursue now that she is disfigured by smallpox. He is relieved when she explains her true purpose and agrees to do everything in his power to protect her privacy in the future. After he gains full status as an attorney, ready to start his own practice (Chapter 59), he again proposes to Esther, who turns Guppy down without telling him she was engaged to Woodcourt.
- Inspector Bucket of the Detective (Branch) is a Metropolitan Police detective who undertakes several investigations throughout the novel, most notably the investigation of the murder of Mr Tulkinghorn. He is notable in being one of the first detectives in English fiction. This character is probably based on Inspector Charles Frederick Field of the then recently formed Detective Branch at Scotland Yard. Dickens wrote several journalistic pieces about the Inspector and the work of the detectives in Household Words. It has also been argued that the character was based on Jack Whicher, one of the 'original' eight detectives set up by Scotland Yard in the middle 19th century.
- Mr George is a former soldier, who once served under Nemo and owns a London shooting-gallery where he trains men in sword and pistol. The first suspect in the murder of Mr Tulkinghorn, he is exonerated and his true identity is revealed, against his wishes, to his mother. He is George Rouncewell, son of the Dedlocks' housekeeper, Mrs Rouncewell, who welcomes him back to Chesney Wold. He ends the book as body-servant to the stricken Sir Leicester Dedlock.
- Caddy (Caroline) Jellyby is a friend of Esther's, secretary to her mother. Caddy feels ashamed of her own "lack of manners", but Esther's friendship heartens her. Caddy falls in love with Prince Turveydrop, marries him, and has a baby.
- Krook is a rag and bottle merchant and collector of papers. He is the landlord of the house where Nemo and Miss Flite live and where Nemo dies. He seems to subsist on a diet of gin. Krook dies from a case of spontaneous combustion, something that Dickens believed could happen, but which some critics (such as the English essayist George Henry Lewes) denounced as outlandish. Amongst the stacks of papers obsessively hoarded by the illiterate Krook is the key to resolving the case of Jarndyce and Jarndyce.
- Jo is a young boy who lives on the streets and tries to make a living as a crossing sweeper. Jo was the only person with whom Nemo had any real connection. Nemo expressed a paternal sort of interest in Jo, something that no other human had ever done. Nemo would share his meagre money with Jo, and would sometimes remark, "Well, Jo, today I am as poor as you," when he had nothing to share. Jo is called to testify at the inquiry into Nemo's death but knows nothing of value. Despite this, Mr Tulkinghorn pays Inspector Bucket to harry Jo and force him to keep "moving along" [leave town] because Mr Tulkinghorn fears Jo might have some knowledge of the connection between Nemo and the Dedlocks. Jo ultimately dies from pneumonia, a complication from an earlier bout with smallpox, which Esther also catches and from which she almost dies.
- Allan Woodcourt is a surgeon and a kind, caring man who loves Esther deeply. She in turn loves him but feels unable to respond, not only because of her prior commitment to John Jarndyce but also because she fears her illegitimacy will cause his mother to object to their connection.
- Grandfather (Joshua) Smallweed is a moneylender, a mean, bad-tempered man who shows no mercy to people who owe him money and who enjoys inflicting emotional pain on others. He lays claim to the deceased Krook's possessions because Smallweed's wife is Krook's sister and only living relation. Smallweed also drives Mr George into bankruptcy by abruptly calling in a loan. It has been suggested that his description (together with his grandchildren) fits that of a person with progeria, although people with progeria only have a life expectancy of 14 years, while Grandfather Smallweed is very old.
- Mr Vholes is a Chancery lawyer who takes on Richard Carstone as a client, squeezes out of him all the litigation fees he can manage to pay, and then abandons him when Jarndyce and Jarndyce comes to an end.
- "Conversation" Kenge is a Chancery lawyer who represents John Jarndyce, and has apprentice attorneys in his office, including Mr Guppy and more briefly, Richard Carstone. His chief foible is his love of grand, pretentious, and empty rhetoric.

=== Minor characters ===
- Mr Gridley (the "Man from Shropshire") is a farmer and involuntary party to a suit in Chancery (based on a real case, according to Dickens's preface), who repeatedly seeks in vain to gain the attention of the Lord Chancellor. He threatens Mr Tulkinghorn and then is put under arrest by Inspector Bucket, but dies, his health broken by his Chancery ordeal. The character is based on the true case of Thomas Cook of Onecote, Leek, which was brought to Dickens's attention in 1849 by his solicitor Mr W. Challinor of Leek.
- Nemo (Latin for "nobody") is the alias of Captain James Hawdon, a former officer in the British Army under whom Mr George once served. Nemo is a law-writer who makes fair copies of legal documents for Snagsby and lodges at Krook's rag and bottle shop, eventually dying of an opium overdose. He is later found to be Lady Dedlock's former lover, and the father of Esther Summerson.
- Mrs Snagsby is Mr Snagsby's highly suspicious and curious wife, who has a "vinegary" personality and incorrectly suspects Mr Snagsby of keeping many secrets from her: she suspects he is Jo's father.
- Guster is the Snagsbys' maidservant, prone to fits of "crying and moaning".
- Neckett is a debt collector – called "Coavinses" by debtor Harold Skimpole because he works for that business firm.
- Charley is Neckett's daughter, hired by John Jarndyce to be a maid to Esther. Called "Little Coavinses" by Skimpole.
- Tom is Neckett's young son.
- Emma is Neckett's baby daughter.
- Mrs Jellyby is Caddy's mother, a "telescopic philanthropist" obsessed with an obscure African tribe but having little regard for the notion of charity beginning at home. It is thought Dickens wrote this character as a criticism of female activists such as Caroline Chisholm.
- Mr Jellyby is Mrs Jellyby's long-suffering husband.
- Peepy Jellyby is the Jellybys' young son.
- Prince Turveydrop is a dancing master and proprietor of a dance studio.
- Old Mr Turveydrop is a master of deportment who lives off his son's industry.
- Jenny is a brickmaker's wife. She is mistreated by her husband and her baby dies. She then helps her friend look after her own child.
- Rosa is a favourite lady's maid of Lady Dedlock whom Watt Rouncewell wishes to marry. The proposal is initially refused when Mr Rouncewell's father asks that Rosa be sent to school to become a lady worthy of his son's station. Lady Dedlock questions the girl closely regarding her wish to leave, and promises to look after her instead. In some way, Rosa is a stand-in for Esther in Lady Dedlock's life.
- Hortense is lady's maid to Lady Dedlock. Her character is based on the Swiss maid and murderer Maria Manning.
- Mrs Rouncewell is housekeeper to the Dedlocks at Chesney Wold.
- Mr Robert Rouncewell, the adult son of Mrs Rouncewell, is a prosperous ironmaster.
- Watt Rouncewell is Robert Rouncewell's son.
- Volumnia is a cousin of the Dedlocks, given to screaming.
- Miss Barbary is Esther's godmother and severe childhood guardian, and sister of Lady Dedlock.
- Mrs Rachael Chadband is a former servant of Miss Barbary's.
- Mr Chadband is an oleaginous preacher, husband of Mrs Chadband.
- Mrs Smallweed is the wife of Mr Smallweed senior and sister to Krook. She is suffering from dementia.
- Young Mr or Bart (Bartholomew) Smallweed is the grandson of the senior Smallweeds, twin of Judy Smallweed, and friend of Mr Guppy.
- Judy (Judith) Smallweed is the granddaughter of the senior Smallweeds, and twin of Bartholomew Smallweed.
- Tony Jobling, who adopts the alias Mr Weevle, is a friend of William Guppy.
- Mrs Guppy is Mr Guppy's aged mother.
- Phil Squod is Mr George's assistant.
- Matthew Bagnet is a military friend of Mr George's and a dealer in musical instruments.
- Mrs Bagnet is the wife of Matthew Bagnet.
- Woolwich is the Bagnets' son.
- Quebec is the Bagnets' elder daughter.
- Malta is the Bagnets' younger daughter.
- Mrs Woodcourt is Allan Woodcourt's widowed mother.
- Mrs Pardiggle is a woman who does "good works" for the poor, but cannot see that her efforts are rude and arrogant, and do nothing at all to help. She inflicts her activities on her five small sons, who are clearly rebellious.
- Arethusa Skimpole is Mr Skimpole's "Beauty" daughter.
- Laura Skimpole is Mr Skimpole's "Sentiment" daughter.
- Kitty Skimpole is Mr Skimpole's "Comedy" daughter.
- Mrs Skimpole is Mr Skimpole's ailing wife, who is weary of her husband and his way of life.
- Debilitated Cousin of Sir Leicester Dedlock, who lies on couches emitting nearly incoherent, dubious observations. Famous line, concerning the murder: "far better hang wrong fler [fellow] than no fler."
- Bayham Badger is a doctor. Richard Carstone studies medicine with him.
- Mrs. Badger is the wife of Bayham Badger. He is her third husband. Her previous husbands were Captain Swosser and Professor Dingo.

== Analysis and criticism ==
=== Narrative structure ===
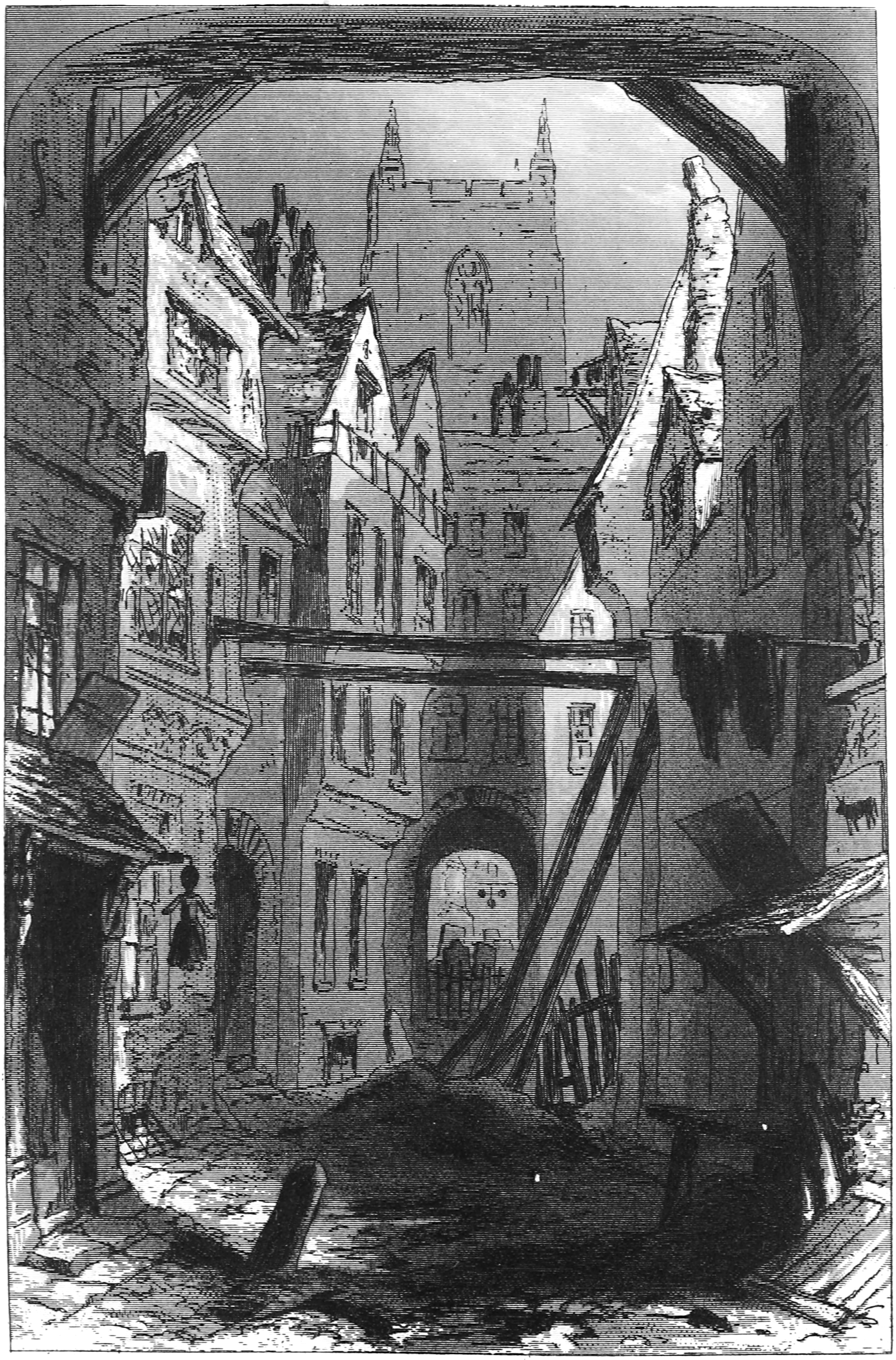
Tom All Alones

Much criticism of Bleak House focuses on its unique narrative structure: it is told both by a third-person omniscient narrator and a first-person narrator (Esther Summerson). The omniscient narrator speaks in the present tense and is a dispassionate observer. Esther Summerson tells her own story in the past tense (like David in David Copperfield or Pip in Great Expectations), and her narrative voice is characterised by modesty, consciousness of her own limits, and willingness to disclose to us her own thoughts and feelings. These two narrative strands never quite intersect, though they do run in parallel. Nabokov felt that letting Esther tell part of the story was Dickens's "main mistake" in planning the novel. Alex Zwerdling, a scholar from Berkeley, after observing that "critics have not been kind to Esther", nevertheless thought Dickens's use of Esther's narrative "one of the triumphs of his art".

=== Feminine modesty ===
Esther's portion of the narrative is perceived by some scholars as an interesting case study of the Victorian ideal of feminine modesty. She introduces herself thus: "I have a great deal of difficulty in beginning to write my portion of these pages, for I know I am not clever" (chap. 3). This claim is almost immediately belied by the astute moral judgement and satiric observation that characterise her pages. In the same introductory chapter, she writes: "It seems so curious to me to be obliged to write all this about myself! As if this narrative were the narrative of my life! But my little body will soon fall into the background now" (chap. 3). This does not turn out to be true.

=== Satire ===
For most readers and scholars, the central concern of Bleak House is its indictment of the English Chancery court system. Chancery or equity courts were one half of the English civil justice system, existing side-by-side with law courts. Chancery courts heard actions having to do with wills and estates, or with the uses of private property. By the mid-nineteenth century, English law reformers had long criticised the delays of Chancery litigation, and Dickens found the subject a tempting target. He already had taken a shot at law-courts and that side of the legal profession in his 1837 novel The Posthumous Papers of the Pickwick Club or The Pickwick Papers. Scholars, such as the English legal historian Sir William Searle Holdsworth, in his 1928 series of lectures, have made a plausible case for treating Dickens's novels, and Bleak House in particular, as primary sources illuminating the history of English law.

=== Spontaneous combustion ===
Dickens said in the preface to the book edition of Bleak House that he had "purposely dwelt upon the romantic side of familiar things". And some remarkable things do happen: One character, Krook, smells of brimstone and eventually dies of spontaneous human combustion. This was highly controversial. The nineteenth century saw the increasing triumph of the scientific worldview. Scientifically inclined writers, as well as physicians and scientists, rejected spontaneous human combustion as legend or superstition. When the instalment of Bleak House containing Krook's demise appeared, the literary critic George Henry Lewes accused Dickens of "giving currency to a vulgar error". Dickens vigorously defended the reality of spontaneous human combustion and cited many documented cases, as well as his own memories of coroners' inquests that he had attended when he had been a reporter. In the preface of the book edition of Bleak House, Dickens wrote: "I shall not abandon the facts until there shall have been a considerable Spontaneous Combustion of the testimony on which human occurrences are usually received."

=== Critical reputation ===
George Gissing and G. K. Chesterton are among those literary critics and writers who consider Bleak House to be the best novel that Dickens wrote. As Chesterton put it: "Bleak House is not certainly Dickens's best book; but perhaps it is his best novel". Harold Bloom, in his book The Western Canon, considers Bleak House to be Dickens's greatest novel. Daniel Burt, in his book The Novel 100: A Ranking of the Greatest Novels of All Time, ranks Bleak House number 12.

== Locations of Bleak House ==
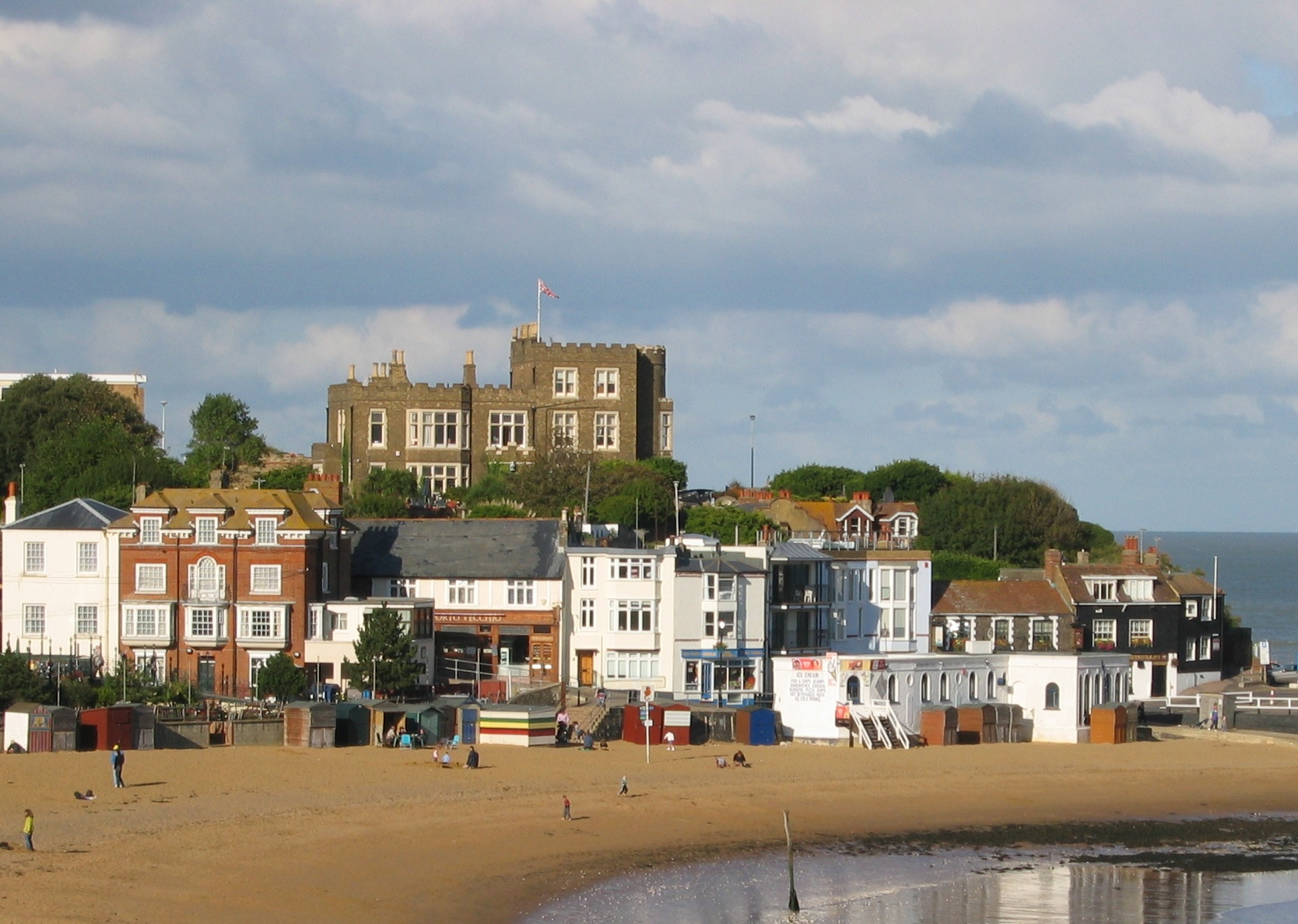
Bleak House in Broadstairs, Kent, where Dickens wrote David Copperfield and other novels

The house named Bleak House in Broadstairs is not the original. Dickens stayed with his family at this house (then called Fort House) for at least one month every summer from 1839 until 1851. There is no evidence that it formed the basis of the fictional Bleak House, particularly as it is so far from the fictional location. The house is on top of the cliff on Fort Road and was renamed Bleak House after his death, in his honour. It is the only four storey grade II listed mansion in Broadstairs. Dickens put the fictional Bleak House in St Albans, Hertfordshire, where he wrote some of the book. An 18th-century house in Folly Lane, St Albans, has been identified as a possible inspiration for the titular house in the story since the time of the book's publication and was known as Bleak House for many years.

== Adaptations ==
In the late nineteenth century, actress Fanny Janauschek acted in a stage version of Bleak House in which she played both Lady Dedlock and her maid Hortense. The two characters never appear on stage at the same time. In 1876 John Pringle Burnett's play, Jo found success in London with his wife, Jennie Lee playing Jo, the crossing-sweeper. In 1893, Jane Coombs acted in a version of Bleak House.

A 1901 short film, The Death of Poor Joe, is the oldest known surviving film featuring a Charles Dickens character (Jo in Bleak House).

In the silent film era, Bleak House was filmed in 1920 and 1922. The latter version featured Sybil Thorndike as Lady Dedlock.

In 1928, a short film made in the UK in the Phonofilm sound-on-film process starred Bransby Williams as Grandfather Smallweed.

In 1998, BBC Radio 4 broadcast a radio adaptation of five hour-long episodes, starring Michael Kitchen as John Jarndyce.

The BBC has produced three television adaptations of Bleak House. The first serial, Bleak House, was broadcast in 1959 in eleven half-hour episodes. The serial survives. The second Bleak House, starring Diana Rigg and Denholm Elliott, aired in 1985 as an eight-part series. In 2005, the third Bleak House was broadcast in fifteen episodes starring Anna Maxwell Martin, Gillian Anderson, Denis Lawson, Charles Dance, and Carey Mulligan. It won a Peabody Award that same year because it "created 'appointment viewing,' soap-style, for a series that greatly rewarded its many extra viewers."

== References in music ==
Charles Jefferys wrote the words for and Charles William Glover wrote the music for songs called "Ada Clare" and "Farewell to the Old House", which are inspired by the novel.

Anthony Phillips included a piece entitled "Bleak House" on his 1979 progressive rock release, Sides. The form of the lyrics roughly follows the narrative of Esther Summerson, and is written in her voice.

== Original publication ==
Like most Dickens novels, Bleak House was published in 20 monthly instalments, each containing 32 pages of text and two illustrations by Phiz (the last two being published together as a double issue). Each cost one shilling, except for the final double issue, which cost two shillings.

Installment	Date of publication	Chapters
I	March 1852	1–4
II	April 1852	5–7
III	May 1852	8–10
IV	June 1852	11–13
V	July 1852	14–16
VI	August 1852	17–19
VII	September 1852	20–22
VIII	October 1852	23–25
IX	November 1852	26–29
X	December 1852	30–32
XI	January 1853	33–35
XII	February 1853	36–38
XIII	March 1853	39–42
XIV	April 1853	43–46
XV	May 1853	47–49
XVI	June 1853	50–53
XVII	July 1853	54–56
XVIII	August 1853	57–59
XIX–XX	September 1853	60–67

== Critical editions ==
Charles Dickens, Bleak House, ed. Nicola Bradbury (Harmondsworth: Penguin, 1996) Charles Dickens, Bleak House, ed. George Ford and Sylvere Monod (W.W. Norton, 1966)

== Sources ==
- Crafts, Hannah; Gates, Henry Louis Jr., eds. (2002). The Bondswoman's Narrative. Warner Books. ISBN 0-7628-7682-4.
- Gates, Henry Louis Jr.; Robbins, Hollis, eds. (2004). "Blackening Bleak House: Hannah Crafts's The Bondwoman's Narrative". In Search of Hannah Crafts: Critical Essays on the Bondwoman's Narrative. Basic/Civitas. ISBN 0-465-02708-3.
- Calkins, Carroll C., ed. (1982). Mysteries of the Unexplained. Pleasantville, New York: The Reader's Digest Association.
- Holdsworth, William S. (1928). Charles Dickens as a Legal Historian. Yale University Press. Contains detailed information on the workings of the Court of Chancery pages 79 to 115.
- Challinor, W. (1849). The Court of Chancery; Its Inherent Defects. London: A.B. Stevens and Norton. OCLC 1079807319.
