= Bleak House (1959 serial) =

- Genre: Drama
- Based on: Bleak House by Charles Dickens
- Written by: Constance Cox
- Starring: Diana Fairfax; Andrew Cruickshank; Colin Jeavons
- Country of origin: United Kingdom
- Original language: English
- No. of series: 1
- No. of episodes: 11

Production
- Producer: Eric Tayler
- Running time: 30 minutes
- Production company: BBC

Original release
- Release: 16 October – 25 December 1959

Bleak House is the first BBC adaptation of Charles Dickens' 1853 novel of the same name. It was adapted by Constance Cox as an eleven-part series of half-hour episodes first transmitted from 16 October 1959. Unlike most television series of the 1950s, the complete serial survived and, in 2017, was released to DVD by Simply Media.

== Cast ==
- Andrew Cruickshank as John Jarndyce
- Diana Fairfax as Esther Summerson
- Colin Jeavons as Richard Carstone
- Elizabeth Shepherd as Ada Clare
- Iris Russell as Honoria, Lady Dedlock
- William Mervyn as Kenge
- Timothy Bateson as William Guppy
- Wilfrid Brambell as Krook
- John Phillips as Mr. Tulkinghorn
- David Horne as Sir Leicester Dedlock
- Richard Pearson as Inspector Bucket
- Malcolm Knight as Jo
- Eileen Draycott as Mrs. Rouncewell
- Jerome Willis as Allan Woodcourt
- Michael Aldridge as Mr. George
- Nora Nicholson as Miss Flite
- Leslie French as Mr. Snagsby
- Aubrey Woods as Tony Jobling
- Annette Carell as Mlle. Hortense
- Angela Crow as Charley

== Archive Status ==
All episodes were originally either broadcast live or recorded on 405 line black and white videotapes, with 35 mm film inserts for exterior scenes. Although the original recordings for the studio and location work no longer exist, the series was telerecorded, and 16 mm film copies have survived intact. At one point during one of the later episodes, an insect can be seen on the screen, having crawled across it during the recording. As the error was unavoidable, no copy of the episode without an insect on the screen exists.

== Critical reception ==
On the series DVD release, Archive Television Musings wrote "Lacking the visual sweep of the later adaptations, this version of Bleak House has to stand or fall on the quality of its actors. Luckily, there's very little to complain about here. There are some fine central performances – Fairfax, Cruickshank and Jeavons especially – whilst...there's strength in depth from the supporting players with Timothy Bateson standing out. Another strong early BBC Dickens serial, Bleak House comes warmly recommended.
