= David Copperfield =

1849–1850 novel by Charles Dickens

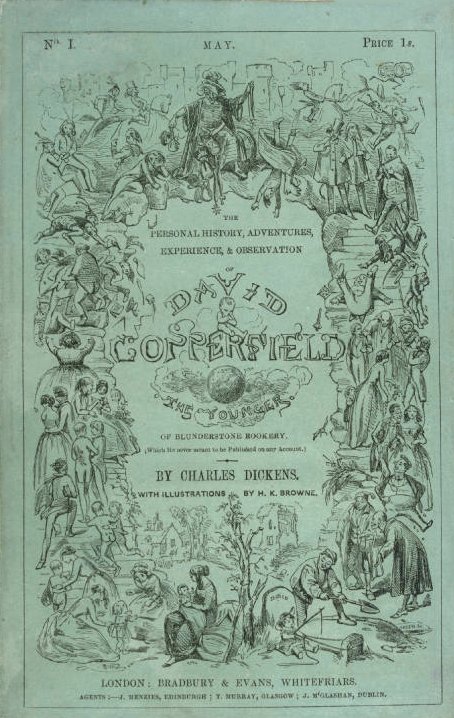
- Cover, first serial edition of 1849
- Author: Charles Dickens
- Original title: The Personal History, Adventures, Experience and Observation of David Copperfield the Younger of Blunderstone Rookery
- Illustrator: Hablot Knight Browne (Phiz)
- Cover artist: Hablot Knight Browne (Phiz)
- Language: English
- Genres: Novel, Bildungsroman
- Published: Serialised May 1849 – November 1850; book format 1850
- Publisher: Bradbury & Evans
- Publication place: England
- Media type: Print
- Pages: 624 (first book edition)
- Preceded by: Dombey and Son
- Followed by: Bleak House

David Copperfield (Note: Dickens invented over 14 variations of the title for this work; see Adams, Hazard (Autumn 1987). "Titles, Titling, and Entitlement to". The Journal of Aesthetics and Art Criticism. 46 (1): 7–21. doi:10.2307/431304. JSTOR 431304.) is a novel by the English author Charles Dickens, narrated by the eponymous David Copperfield, detailing his adventures in his journey from infancy to maturity. As such, it is typically categorized in the bildungsroman genre. It was published as a serial in 1849 and 1850 and then as a book later in 1850.

David Copperfield is also a partially autobiographical novel: "a very complicated weaving of truth and invention", with events following Dickens's own life. Of the books he wrote, it was his favourite. It has been called "the triumph of the art of Dickens" and marks a turning point in his work, separating the novels of youth and those of maturity.

At first glance, the work is modelled on 18th-century "personal histories" that were very popular, like Henry Fielding's Joseph Andrews or Tom Jones, but David Copperfield is a more carefully structured work. It begins, like other novels by Dickens, with a bleak picture of childhood in Victorian England, followed by young Copperfield's slow social ascent, as he painfully provides for his aunt, while continuing his studies.

Dickens wrote without an outline, unlike his previous novel, Dombey and Son. Some aspects of the story were fixed in his mind from the start, but others were undecided until the serial publications were underway. The novel has a primary theme of growth and change, but Dickens also satirises many aspects of Victorian life. These include the plight of prostitutes, the status of women in marriage, class structure, the criminal justice system, legal record keeping, the quality of schools, and the employment of children in factories.

== Plot summary ==
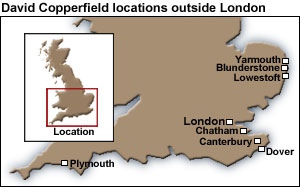
The England of David Copperfield.

The story follows the life of David Copperfield from childhood to maturity. David was born in Blunderstone, Suffolk, England, six months after the death of his father. David spends his early years residing in a small house called the Rookery. His loving and childish mother, Clara Copperfield, and their kindly housekeeper, Clara Peggotty, bring him up here; they call him Davy. When he is seven years old, his mother surprises David by marrying Edward Murdstone while the boy is visiting Peggotty's family in Yarmouth. Her brother, a fisherman named Daniel Peggotty, lives in a beached barge, with his adopted niece and nephew Emily and Ham, and an elderly widow, Mrs Gummidge. "Little Em'ly" is somewhat spoiled by her fond foster father, and David is in love with her. Here he is known as “Master Copperfield.”

On his return, David discovers his mother has married and is immediately given good reason to dislike his stepfather, Murdstone, who believes exclusively in stern, harsh parenting, calling it "firmness". David has similar feelings for Murdstone's sister Jane, who moves into the house soon afterwards. Between them, they tyrannise David and his poor mother, making their lives miserable. When David falls behind in his studies, Murdstone thrashes him, and David bites his hand. In consequence, he is sent away to Salem House, a boarding school, under a ruthless headmaster named Mr Creakle. There he is befriended by two quite different older boys, James Steerforth and Tommy Traddles. He develops an impassioned admiration for Steerforth, perceiving him as someone noble, who could do great things if he would, and one who pays attention to him.

David goes home for the holidays to learn that his mother has given birth to a baby boy. Shortly after David returns to Salem House, his mother and her baby die, and David returns home immediately. Peggotty marries the local carrier, Mr Barkis. Murdstone sends David to work for a wine merchant in London – a business of which Murdstone is a joint owner. After some months, David's friendly but spendthrift landlord, Wilkins Micawber, is arrested for debt and sent to the King's Bench Prison, and the rest of Mr. Micawber's family soon moves to the Prison too. David visits the Micawbers regularly at the Prison and boards nearby. When Micawber's release is imminent, the Micawbers decide they will soon move to Plymouth. David realises that will leave him alone in London, where no one cares about him. He makes up his mind to run away to Dover to find his only known remaining relative, his eccentric and kind-hearted great-aunt Betsey Trotwood. She had come to Blunderstone at his birth, only to depart in ire upon learning that he was not a girl. However, she takes it upon herself to raise David, despite Murdstone's attempt to regain custody of him. She encourages him to 'be as like his sister, 'Betsey Trotwood' as he can be – that is, to meet the expectations she had for the girl who was never born. David's great-aunt renames him "Trotwood Copperfield" and addresses him as "Trot", one of several names others call David in the novel.

David's aunt sends him to a better school than the last he attended. It is run by kind Dr. Strong, whose methods inculcate honour and self-reliance in his pupils. During term, David lodges with the lawyer Mr Wickfield and his daughter Agnes, who becomes David's friend and confidante. Wickfield's clerk, Uriah Heep, also lives at the house.

By devious means, Uriah Heep gradually gains a complete ascendancy over the aging and alcoholic Wickfield, to Agnes's great sorrow. Heep, as he maliciously confides to David, aspires to marry Agnes. Ultimately with the aid of Micawber, who has been employed by Heep as a secretary, his fraudulent behaviour is revealed. (At the end of the book, David encounters him in prison, convicted of attempting to defraud the Bank of England.)

After completing school, David apprentices to be a proctor. During this time, due to Heep's fraudulent activities, his aunt's fortune has diminished. David toils to make a living. He works mornings and evenings for his former teacher Dr Strong as a secretary and also starts to learn shorthand, with the help of his old school-friend Traddles, upon completion reporting parliamentary debate for a newspaper. With considerable moral support from Agnes and his own great diligence and hard work, David ultimately finds fame and fortune as an author, writing fiction.

David's romantic but self-serving school friend, Steerforth, also re-acquainted with David, goes on to seduce and dishonour Emily, offering to marry her off to his manservant Littimer before deserting her in Europe. Her uncle Dan Peggotty manages to find her with the help of Martha, who had grown up in their part of England and then settled in London. Ham, who had been engaged to marry Emily before the tragedy, dies in a fierce storm off the coast while rescuing shipwreck victims. Steerforth was aboard the ship and also dies. Mr Peggotty takes Emily to a new life in Australia, accompanied by Mrs Gummidge and the Micawbers, where all eventually find security and happiness.

Meanwhile, David has fallen in love with Dora Spenlow, and marries her. Their marriage proves troublesome for David in the sense of everyday practical affairs, but he never stops loving her. Dora dies early in their marriage after a miscarriage. After Dora's death, Agnes encourages David to return to normal life and his profession of writing. While living in Switzerland to dispel his grief over so many losses, David realises that he loves Agnes. Upon returning to Britain, after a failed attempt to conceal his feelings, David finds that Agnes loves him too. They quickly marry, and in this marriage he finds true happiness. David and Agnes then have at least five children, including a daughter named after his great-aunt, Betsey Trotwood.

== Characters ==
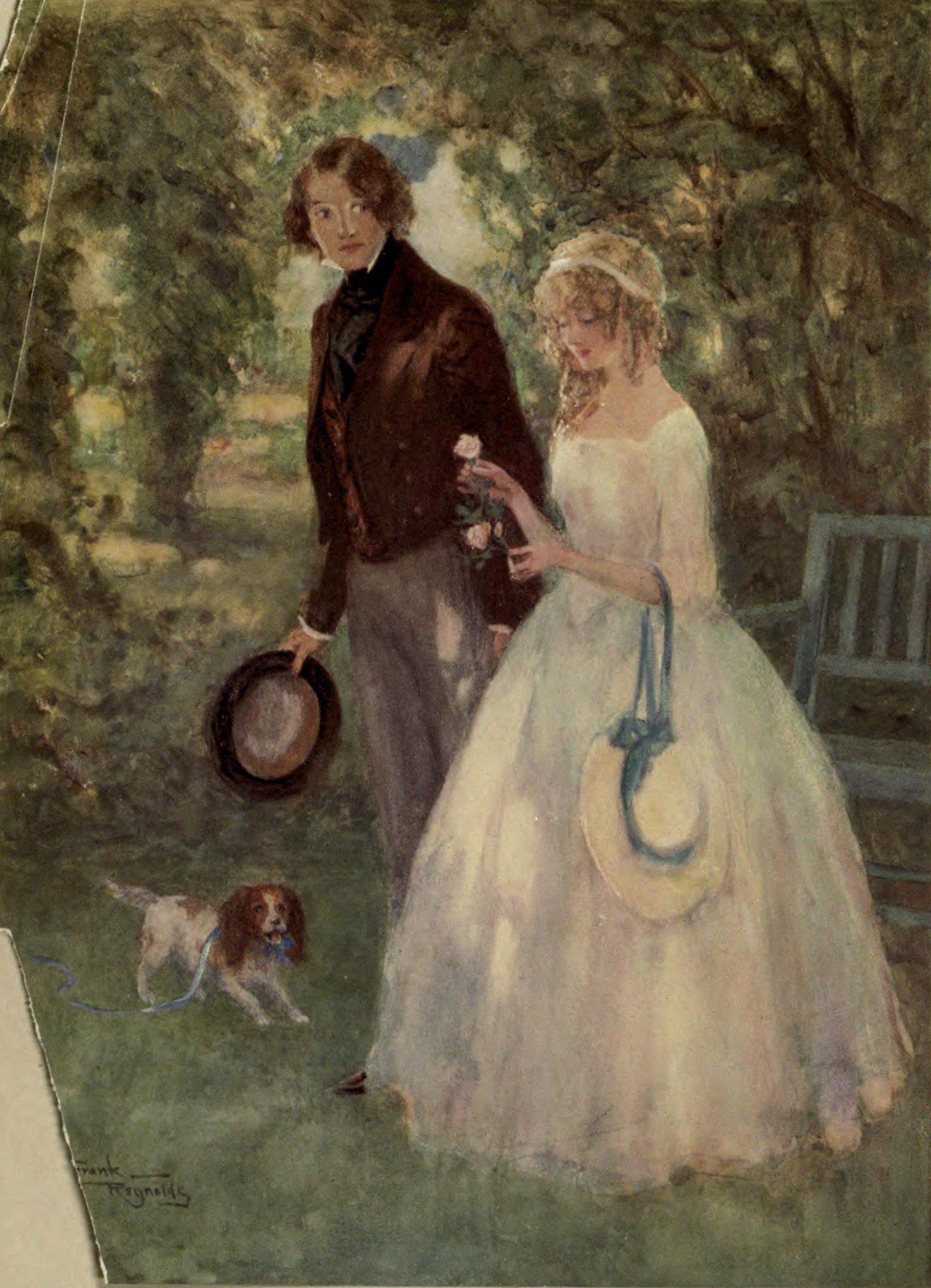
Illustration of David falling in love with Dora Spenlow, by Frank Reynolds

David Copperfield
The narrator and protagonist of the novel. David's father, David Sr, dies six months before he is born, and he is raised by his mother and nursemaid Peggotty until his mother remarries. David's stepfather, Mr Murdstone, sends David away to a boarding school. While attending school, David learns his mother has died, on his ninth birthday. He is sent to work at a factory until he runs away to find his aunt. David Copperfield is characterised in the book as trusting, goal-oriented, but as yet immature. He marries Dora Spenlow and later Agnes Wickfield.
Clara Copperfield
David's affectionate and beautiful mother, described as being innocently childish. She is married to David Copperfield Sr until his death, and gives birth six months later to the central character of the novel. She loves and coddles young David with the help of Peggotty. Years later she remarries, to Mr Murdstone. She dies a couple of months after the birth of her second son, who dies a day or so later, while David is away at Salem House boarding school.
Clara Peggotty
The faithful servant of the Copperfield family and a lifelong companion to David – she is called by her surname Peggotty within David's family, as her given name is Clara, the same as David's mother; she is also referred to at times as Barkis after her marriage to Mr Barkis. After her husband's death, Peggotty helps to put in order David's rooms in London and then returns to Yarmouth to keep house for her nephew, Ham Peggotty. Following Ham's death, she keeps house for David's great-aunt, Betsey Trotwood.
Betsey Trotwood
David's eccentric and temperamental yet kind-hearted great-aunt; she becomes his guardian after he runs away from the Murdstone and Grinby warehouse in Blackfriars, London. She is present on the night of David's birth but leaves after hearing that Clara Copperfield's child is a boy instead of a girl, and is not seen again until David flees to her house in Dover from London. She is portrayed as affectionate towards David, and defends him and his late mother when Mr Murdstone arrives to take custody of David: she confronts the man and rebukes him for his abuse of David and his mother, then threatens him and drives him off the premises. Universally believed to be a widow, she conceals the existence of her ne'er-do-well husband who occasionally bleeds her for money.
Dr Edward Chillip
A shy doctor who assists at David's birth and faces the wrath and anger of Betsey Trotwood after he informs her that Clara's baby is a boy instead of the girl Betsey wanted. David meets this doctor each time he returns to the neighbourhood of his birth. Mr Chillip, met in London when David Copperfield returns from Switzerland, tells David of the fate of Murdstone's second wife, which is much the same as the fate of David's mother.
Mr Barkis
An aloof carter who declares his intention to marry Peggotty after eating her handmade pastries. He says to David: "Tell her, 'Barkis is willin'!' Just so." Peggotty marries him after Clara Copperfield's death. He is a miser, keeping an unexpected amount of wealth in a plain box labelled "Old Clothes". He bequeaths two-thirds of his money to his wife from his savings of £3,000 (equivalent to £349,000 in 2025) when he dies after about ten years of marriage. He leaves annuities for Mr Daniel Peggotty, Little Emily, and David from the rest.
Edward Murdstone
The main antagonist of the first half of the novel, he is Young David's cruel stepfather who beats him for falling behind in his studies and emotionally torments Clara. David reacts by biting Mr Murdstone, and is sent to Salem House – a private school owned by Mr Murdstone's friend Mr Creakle – in retribution. After David's mother dies, he sends David to work at his factory in London. He appears at Betsey Trotwood's Dover house after David runs away. Mr Murdstone appears to show signs of repentance when confronted by Copperfield's aunt about his treatment of Clara and David, but when David works at Doctors' Commons years later, he meets Murdstone taking out a marriage licence for his next young and trusting wife.
Jane Murdstone
Mr Murdstone's equally cruel spinster sister, who moves into the Copperfield house shortly after Mr Murdstone marries Clara Copperfield, taking over the housekeeping. Much like her brother she is domineering, mean-spirited, and petty. She is the "Confidential Friend" of David's first wife, Dora Spenlow, and is the one who found David's letters to Dora, and creates the scene between David Copperfield and Dora's father, Mr Spenlow. Later, she rejoins her brother and his second wife in a marriage much like the one with David's mother.
Daniel Peggotty
Peggotty's brother; a humble but generous Yarmouth fisherman who takes his nephew Ham and niece Emily into his custody after each of them has been orphaned. He welcomes David as a child when holidaying in Yarmouth with Peggotty. When Emily is older and runs away with David's friend Steerforth, he travels around the world in search of her. He eventually finds her as a prostitute in London, and after that, they emigrate to Australia.

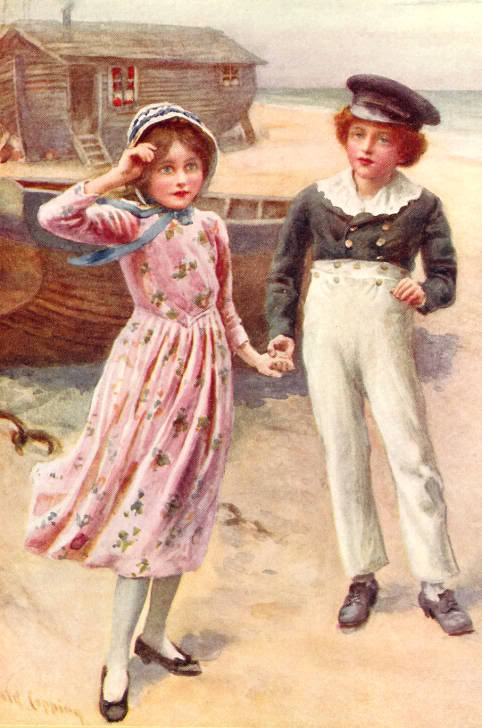
David and Emily on the beach at Yarmouth, by Harold Copping.

Emily (Little Em'ly)
The niece of Daniel Peggotty and his sister Clara Peggotty. She is a childhood friend of David Copperfield, who loved her in his childhood days. She abandons Ham, her cousin and fiancé, on the eve of their wedding, disappearing abroad with Steerforth for several years. Broken by Steerforth's desertion, she does not go back home, but she does eventually go to London. With the help of Martha, her uncle recovers her from the brink of prostitution, after Rosa Dartle rants at her. She accompanies her uncle to Australia.
Ham Peggotty
The good-natured nephew of Mr Peggotty who is tall and strong, and becomes a skilled boat builder. He is the fiancé of Emily before she leaves him for Steerforth. His aunt, (Clara) Peggotty, looks after Ham once Emily is gone. When a fierce storm at sea off Yarmouth demasts a merchant ship from the south, Ham attempts to rescue the crew, but is drowned by the ferocity of the waves before he can reach anyone. News of his death, a day before Emily and Mr Peggotty's emigration, is withheld from his family to enable them to leave without hesitation or remorse.
Mrs Gummidge
The widow of Daniel Peggotty's partner, who is taken in and supported by Daniel after his partner's death. She is a self-described "lone, lorn creetur" who spends much of her time pining for "the old 'un" (her late husband). After Emily runs away with Steerforth, she renounces her self-pity and becomes Daniel and Ham's primary caretaker. She too emigrates to Australia with Daniel and Emily. In Australia, when she receives a marriage proposal, she responds by attacking the unlucky suitor with a bucket.
Martha Endell
A young woman, once Little Emily's friend, who flees to London after an unspecified disgrace. She falls into prostitution and is stopped from suicide by Daniel Peggotty and David, resolving to help them recover Emily. She emigrates with the Peggotty family to Australia, where she marries an outback farmer.
Mr Creakle
The harsh headmaster of young David's boarding school, Salem House, who is assisted by the one-legged Tungay. Mr Creakle is a friend of Mr Murdstone. He singles out David for extra torment at Murdstone's request, but later treats him normally after David apologises to Murdstone. With a surprising amount of delicacy, Creakle's wife breaks the news to David that his mother has died. Later, he becomes a Middlesex magistrate and is considered 'enlightened' for his day. He runs his prison by the system and is portrayed with great sarcasm, as he thinks that his model inmates, Heep and Littimer, have changed their criminal ways because of his intervention.
James Steerforth
A student at Creakle's school who befriends young David, even as he takes over David's money. He is condescending to other social classes, a snob who unhesitatingly takes advantage of his younger friends and uses his mother's influence, going so far as to get Mr Mell dismissed from the school because Mell's mother lives in an almshouse. Although he grows into a charming and handsome young man, he proves to be lacking in character when he seduces and later abandons Little Em'ly. He eventually drowns at Yarmouth in a fierce storm at sea, washing up on the shore after the merchant ship breaks apart.
Tommy Traddles
David's friend from Salem House. Traddles is one of the few boys who does not trust Steerforth and is notable for drawing skeletons on his slate. (David speculates that this is to cheer himself up with the macabre thought that his predicaments are only temporary.) He and David meet again later and become lifelong friends. Traddles works hard but faces great obstacles because of his lack of money and connections. He succeeds in making a name and a career for himself, becoming a Judge and marrying his true love, Sophy.
Wilkins Micawber
A melodramatic, kind-hearted gentleman who has a way with words and eternal optimism. He befriends David as a young boy in London, taking him as a lodger. Micawber suffers from financial difficulty and spends time in a debtors' prison before moving his family briefly to Plymouth. Micawber meets David again, passing by the Heep household in Canterbury when David is taking tea there. Micawber takes a position at Wickfield and Heep. Thinking Micawber is weak-minded, Heep makes him an accomplice in several of his schemes, but Micawber turns the tables on his employer and is instrumental in his downfall. Micawber emigrates to Australia, where he enjoys a successful career as a sheep farmer and becomes a magistrate. He is based on Dickens's father, John Dickens, who faced similar financial problems when Dickens was a child, but never emigrated.
Emma Micawber
Wilkins Micawber's wife and the mother of their five children. She comes from a wealthy family who disapprove of her husband, but she constantly protests that she will "never leave Micawber!"
Mr Dick (Richard Babley)
A slightly deranged, rather childish but amiable man who lives with Betsey Trotwood; they are distant relatives. His madness is amply described; he claims to have the "trouble" of King Charles I in his head. He is fond of making gigantic kites and tries to write a "Memorial" (that is, a Petition – though on what subject is never revealed) but is unable to focus and finish it. Despite his limitations, Dick is able to see issues with a certain clarity. He proves to be not only a kind and loyal friend but also demonstrates a keen emotional intelligence, particularly when he helps Dr and Mrs Strong through a marriage crisis.
Mr Wickfield
The widowed father of Agnes Wickfield and lawyer to Betsey Trotwood. While David attends school in Canterbury, he stays with the Wickfields until he graduates. Mr Wickfield feels guilty that, through his love, he has hurt his daughter by keeping her too close to himself. This sense of guilt leads him to drink. His apprentice Uriah Heep uses the information to lead Mr Wickfield down a slippery slope, encouraging the alcoholism and feelings of guilt, and eventually convincing him that he has committed improprieties while inebriated, and blackmailing him. He is saved by Mr Micawber, and his friends consider him to have become a better man through the experience.
Agnes Wickfield
Mr Wickfield's mature and lovely daughter and close friend of David since he began school at Dr Strong's in Canterbury. Agnes nurtures an unrequited love for David for many years but never tells him, helping and advising him through his infatuation with, and marriage to Dora. After David returns to England, he realises his feelings for her, and she becomes David's second wife and mother of their children.
Uriah Heep
The main antagonist of the novel's second half, Heep serves first as clerk from age 11 or 12; at age 15 he meets Copperfield and a few years later becomes partner to Mr Wickfield. He presents himself as self-deprecating and talks of being "'umble", but gradually reveals his wicked and twisted character. He gains power over Wickfield but is exposed by Wilkins Micawber and Traddles, who have gathered evidence that Uriah committed many acts of fraud. By forging Mr Wickfield's signature, he misappropriates the personal wealth of the Wickfield family, together with portfolios entrusted to them by others, including funds belonging to Betsey Trotwood. He fools Wickfield into thinking he has himself committed this act while drunk, and then blackmails him. Heep is defeated but not prosecuted. He is later imprisoned for a separate fraud on the Bank of England. He nurtures a deep hatred of David Copperfield and of many others, though in some ways he is a mirror to David, wanting to get ahead and to marry the boss's daughter.
Mrs Heep
Uriah's mother, who is as sycophantic as her son. She has instilled in him his lifelong tactic of pretending to be subservient to achieve his goals, and even as his schemes fall apart she begs him to save himself by "being 'umble".
Dr Strong and Annie Strong
Director and assistant of the school David attends in Canterbury. Dr Strong's main concern is to work on his dictionary, where, at the end of the novel, he has reached the letter D. The Doctor is 62 when David meets him, and married about a year to Annie, considerably younger than her husband. In this happy loving couple, each one cares more about the other than about themselves. The depth of their feeling allows them to defeat the efforts of Uriah Heep in trying to break their union.
Jack Maldon
A cousin and childhood sweetheart of Annie Strong. He continues to bear affection for her and assumes she will leave Dr Strong for him. Instead, Dr Strong helps him financially and in finding a position. Maldon is charming, and after his time in India, he ends up in London society, in a social circle with Julia Mills. They live a life that seems empty to the adult David Copperfield.
Julia Mills
She is a friend of Dora who supports Dora's romance with David Copperfield; she moves to India when her father gets a new position. She marries a wealthy Scottish man, a "Scotch Croesus", and lives in London in the end. She thinks of little besides money.
Mrs Markleham
Annie's mother, nicknamed "The Old Soldier" by her husband's students for her stubbornness. She tries to take pecuniary advantage of her son-in-law Dr Strong in every way possible, to Annie's sorrow.
Mrs Emma Steerforth
The wealthy widowed mother of James Steerforth. She dotes on her son to the point of being completely blind to his faults. When Steerforth disgraces his family and the Peggottys by running off with Em'ly, Mrs Steerforth blames Em'ly for corrupting her son, rather than accept that James has disgraced an innocent girl. The news of her son's death destroys her. She lives on, but she never recovers from the shock.
Rosa Dartle
Steerforth's cousin, a bitter, sarcastic spinster who lives with Mrs Steerforth. She is secretly in love with Steerforth and blames others such as Emily and Steerforth's mother for corrupting him. She is described as being thin and displays a visible scar on her lip caused by Steerforth in one of his violent rages as a child.
Francis Spenlow
A lawyer, employer of David as a proctor and the father of Dora Spenlow. He dies suddenly of a heart attack while driving his phaeton home. After his death, it is revealed that he is heavily in debt, and left no will.
Dora Spenlow
The adorable daughter of Mr Spenlow who becomes David's first wife after a long courtship. She is described as being impractical and has many similarities to David's mother. In their first year of marriage, David learns their differences as to keeping a house in order. Dora does not learn firmness, but remains herself, affectionate with David and attached to her lapdog, Jip. She is not unaware of their differences, and asks David, whom she calls "Doady", to think of her as a "child-wife". She suffers a miscarriage, which begins a long illness from which she dies with David's childhood friend and later second wife Agnes Wickfield at her side.
Littimer
Steerforth's obsequious valet (repeatedly described as being "respectable"), who is instrumental in aiding his seduction of Emily. Littimer is always polite and correct but his condescending manner intimidates David, who always feels as if Littimer is reminding him how young he is. He later winds up in prison for embezzlement, and his manners allow him to con his way to the stature of Model Prisoner in Creakle's establishment.
Miss Mowcher
a dwarf and Steerforth's hairdresser. Though she participates in Steerforth's circle as a witty and glib gossip, she is strong against the discomfort others might feel associated with her dwarfism. She is later instrumental in Littimer's arrest.
Mr Mell
A poor teacher at Salem House. He takes David to Salem House and is the only adult there who is kind to him. His mother lives in a workhouse, and Mell supports her with his wages. When Steerforth discovers this information from David, he uses it to get Creakle to fire Mell. Near the end of the novel, Copperfield discovers in an Australian newspaper that Mell has emigrated and is now Doctor Mell of Colonial Salem-House Grammar School, Port Middlebay, married with children.
Sophy Crewler
One of a family of ten daughters, Sophy runs the household and takes care of all her sisters. She and Traddles are engaged to be married, but her family has made Sophy so indispensable that they do not want her to part from them with Traddles. The pair do eventually marry and settle down happily, and Sophy proves to be an invaluable aid in Traddles's legal career, while still helping her sisters.
Mr Sharp
The chief teacher of Salem House, he has more authority than Mr Mell. He looks weak, both in health and character; his head seems to be very heavy for him; he walks on one side, and has a big nose.
Mr Jorkins
The rarely seen partner of Mr Spenlow. Spenlow uses him as a scapegoat for any unpopular decision he chooses to make, painting Jorkins as an inflexible tyrant, but Jorkins is, in fact, a meek and timid nonentity who, when confronted, takes the same track by blaming his inability to act on Mr Spenlow.

== Autobiographical novel ==
=== Fragments of autobiography ===
Between 1845 and 1848, Dickens wrote fragments of autobiography, excerpts of which he showed to his wife and John Forster. Then in 1855 he made an attempt at revising it. This was a failure because, as he tells his first love Maria Beadnell (now Mrs Winter), when he began dealing with his youthful love for her, "I lost courage and burned the rest". Paul Schlicke points out that in fact not all the pages have gone through the flames and that, as Dickens began writing David Copperfield some pages were unearthed. Proof of this is found in the eleventh chapter of the novel: "I begin Life on my own Account and don't like it", where the story of Dickens's experience at the Warren Shoe Factory is told almost verbatim, with the only change, "Mr Micawber" instead of "my father". John Forster also published substantial extracts relating to this period in Dickens's biography, including a paragraph devoted to Wellington House College, which corresponds with the second stage of childhood recounted in the novel. Thus Dickens looks back on his painful past, already evoked by the martyrdom of Little Paul in Dombey and Son, though voiced by an omniscient narrator in that earlier novel. Until Forster published his biography of Dickens in 1872–1874, no one knew that Dickens had worked in a factory as a child, not even his wife, until Dickens wrote it down and gave the papers to Forster in 1847. The first generations of readers did not know this part of David Copperfield's story began like an incident in the author's life.

=== The autobiographical dimension ===
If David Copperfield has come to be Dickens's "darling", it is because it is the most autobiographical of all his novels. Some of the most painful episodes of his life are barely disguised; others appear indirectly, termed "oblique revelations" by Paul Davis. However, Dickens himself wrote to Forster that the book is not a pure autobiography, but "a very complicated weaving of truth and invention".

==== The autobiographical material ====
The most important autobiographical material concerns the months that Dickens, still a child, spent at the Warren factory, his diligence with his first love, Maria Beadnell (see Catherine Dickens and Ellen Ternan), and finally his career as a journalist and writer. As pointed out by his biographer and friend John Forster, these episodes are essentially factual: the description of forced labour to which David is subjected at Murdstone and Grinby reproduces verbatim the autobiographical fragments entrusted to his friend; David's fascination with Dora Spenlow is similar to that inspired by the capricious Maria; the major stages of his career, from his apprenticeship at Doctors' Commons to writing his first novel, via the shorthand reporting of parliamentary procedures, also follow those of its creator.

However, this material, like the other autobiographical aspects of the novel, is not systematically reproduced as such. The cruel Mr Murdstone is very different from the real James Lamert, cousin to Dickens, being the stepson of Mrs Dickens's mother's sister, who lived with the family in Chatham and Camden Town, and who had found for the young Charles the place of tagger in the shoe factory he managed for his brother-in-law George. The end of this episode looks nothing like what happens in the novel; in reality, contrary to the desire of his mother that he continue to work, it is his father who took him out of the warehouse to send him to school. Contrary to Charles's frustrated love for Maria Beadnell, who pushed him back in front of his parents' opposition, David, in the novel, marries Dora Spenlow and, with satisfaction ex post facto, writes Paul Davis, virtually "kills" the recalcitrant stepfather. Finally, David's literary career seems less agitated than that of Dickens, and his results are much less spectacular. David's natural modesty alone does not explain all these changes; Paul Davis expresses the opinion that Dickens recounts his life as he would have liked it, and along with "conscious artistry", Dickens knows how to borrow data, integrate them to his original purpose and transform them according to the novelistic necessities, so that "In the end, Copperfield is David's autobiography, not Dickens's".

== Sources and context ==
=== Dickens's past ===
David Copperfield is the contemporary of two major memory-based works, William Wordsworth's The Prelude (1850), an autobiographical poem about the formative experiences of his youth and Tennyson's In Memoriam (1850) which eulogises the memory of his friend, Arthur Hallam. (Note: Actually Wordsworth began writing this work in 1798–99.) There is Wordsworth's romantic questioning on the personal development of the individual and there is Tennyson's Victorian confrontation with change and doubt. According to Andrew Sanders, David Copperfield reflects both types of response, which give this novel the privileged position of representing the hinge of the century.

The memories of Dickens are, according to Paul Schlicke, remarkably transmuted into fiction. The experience Dickens lived, as the son of a brazen impenitent, is celebrated through the comic figure of Wilkins Micawber. Dickens's youthful passion for Maria Beadnell resurfaces with tenderness, in the form of David's impractical marriage with Dora Spenlow. Dickens's decision to make David a novelist emphasises how he used this book to re-invent himself as a man and artist, "The world would not take another Pickwick from me, but we can be cheerful and merry, and with a little more purpose in us". If the preoccupation with the adventures of a hero, associated with a parade of comic or grotesque characters, looks back to Dickens's earlier novels, the interest in personal development, the pessimistic atmosphere and the complex structure of Copperfield foreshadow other novels.

Despite never living there, Dickens knew the City of Canterbury well and includes numerous references to it. David Copperfield regularly visits the cathedral services at Canterbury Cathedral, and Mr Micawber wants his son to become a chorister. The Guildhall is mentioned when David Copperfield is asked by the barrister to visit. Dr Strong and Annie Markleham get married at St Alphege church, which is also situated prominently in Canterbury.

=== Contemporaneous novels ===
In 1847, Jane Eyre, Charlotte Brontë's first-person narrative, was acclaimed as soon as it was published. Unlike Thackeray, who adored it, Dickens claimed years later never to have read it. True or false, he had encountered Elizabeth Gaskell's Mary Barton, a novel that called for understanding and sympathy in a class-eaten society. Thackeray's Pendennis was serialised at the same time as David Copperfield and it depicts its hero's personal and social journey from the countryside to the city. A rivalry existed between the two writers, though it preoccupied Thackeray more than Dickens. The most direct literary influence is "obviously Carlyle" who, in a lecture given in 1840, the year of his meeting with Dickens, on "On Heroes, Hero-Worship" and "the Heroic in History", claims that the most important modern character is "the hero as a man of letters". This is David's destiny, through experience, perseverance and seriousness.

== Development of the novel ==
=== First inspirations ===
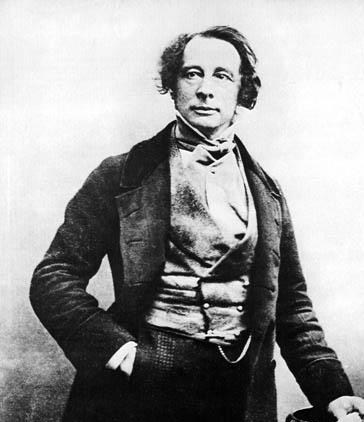
Charles Dickens in 1850

On 7 January 1849, Dickens visited Norwich and Yarmouth in Norfolk, with two close friends, John Leech (1817–1864) and Mark Lemon (1809–1870). Leech was an illustrator at Punch, a satirical magazine, and the first illustrator for A Christmas Carol by Dickens in 1843. Lemon was a founding editor of Punch, and soon a contributor to Household Words, the weekly magazine Dickens was starting up; he co-authored Mr Nightingale's Diary, a farce, with Dickens in 1851. The two towns, especially the second, became important in the novel, and Dickens informed Forster that Yarmouth seemed to him to be "the strangest place in the world" and that he would "certainly try my hand at it". During a walk in the vicinity of Yarmouth, Dickens noticed a sign indicating the small locality of Blundeston, which became in his novel the village of "Blunderstone" where David is born and spends his childhood.

A week after his arrival in Yarmouth, his sixth son, Henry Fielding Dickens, was born. The boy was named after Henry Fielding, his favourite past author. Per Forster, Dickens refers to Fielding "as a kind of homage to the novel he was about to write".

As always with Dickens, when a writing project began, he was agitated, melancholic, "even deeper than the customary birth pangs of other novels"; as always, he hesitated about the title, and his working notes contain seventeen variants, "Charles Copperfield" included. After several attempts, he stopped on "The Copperfield Survey of the World as it Rolled", a title that he retained until 19 April. When Forster pointed out that his hero, now called David, has his own initials transposed, Dickens was intrigued and declared that this was a manifestation of his fate. He was not yet sure of his pen: "Though I know what I want to do, I am lumbering like a train wagon", he told Forster.

=== No general plan, but an inspired novel ===
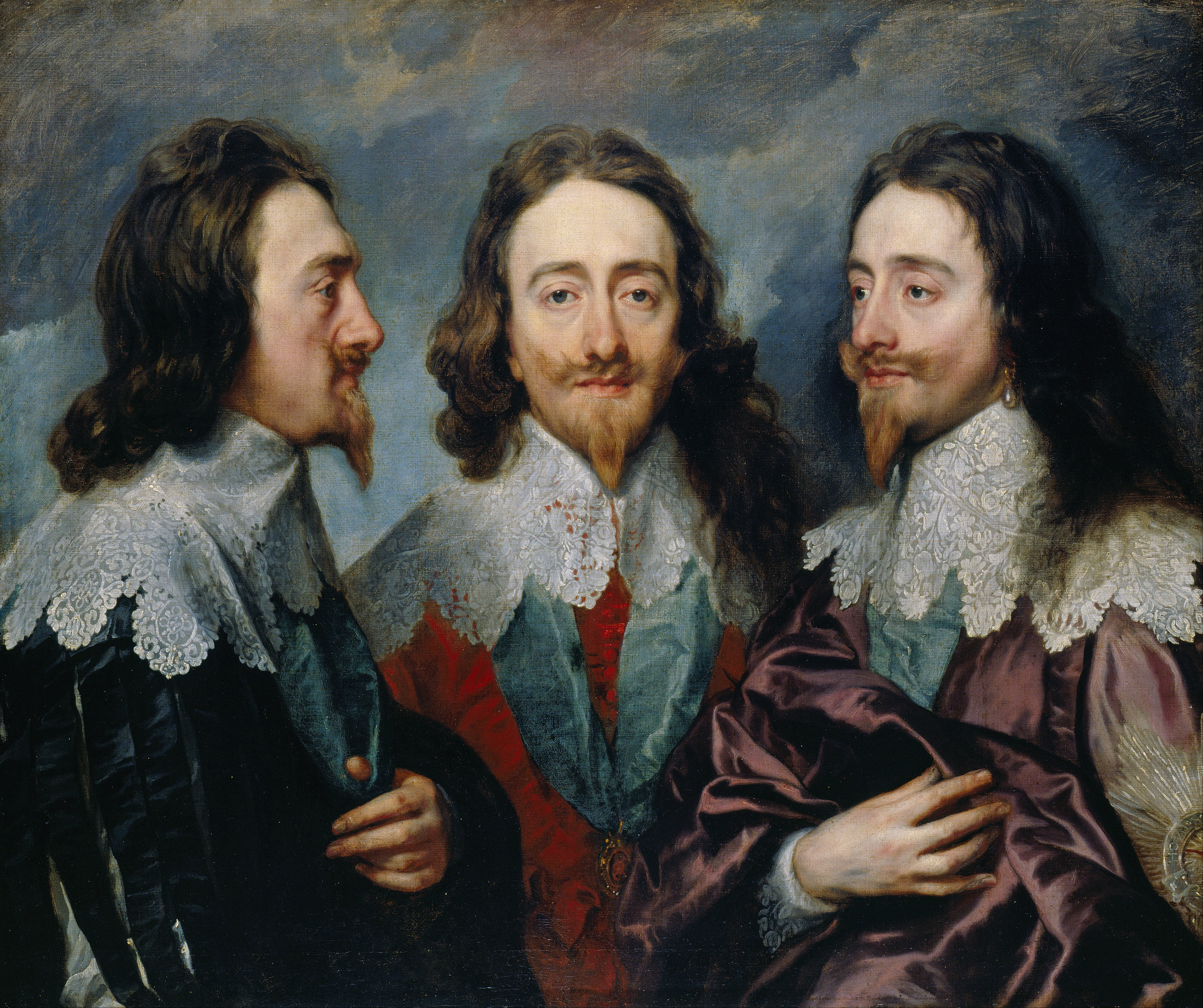
Charles I (1600–49), whose decapitation is the obsession of Mr Dick. Charles I in Three Positions by Anthony Van Dyck 1635–1636.

Contrary to the method previously used for Dombey and Son, Dickens did not elaborate an overall plan and often wrote the summary of a chapter after completing it. Four character names were found at the last moment: Traddles, Barkis, Creakle and Steerforth; the profession of David remained uncertain until the eighth issue (printed in December 1849, containing Chapters 22–24, in which David chooses to be trained as a proctor); and Paul Schlicke notes that the future of Dora was still not determined on 17 May 1850 (when 37 chapters had been published in the first 12 monthly instalments). Other major aspects of the novel, however, were immediately fixed, such as David's meeting with Aunt Betsey, Emily's fall or Agnes's role as the "real" heroine of the story.

Once launched, Dickens became "quite confident". The most difficult thing was to insert "what I know so well", his experience at the Warren factory; once the threads were woven, however, the truth mixed with fiction, he exulted and congratulated himself in a letter to Forster. From now on, he wrote in this letter, the story "bore him irresistibly along". Never, it seems, was he in the grip of failures of inspiration, so "ardent [was his] sympathy with the creatures of the fancy which always made real to him their sufferings or sorrows."

Changes in detail occurred during the composition: on 22 August 1849, while staying on the Isle of Wight for a family vacation, he changed on the advice of Forster, the theme of the obsession of Mr Dick, a secondary character in the novel. This theme was originally "a bull in a china shop" and became "King Charles's head" in a nod to the bicentenary of the execution of Charles I of England. (Note: Charles I was born into the House of Stuart 19 November 1600, and was King of England, Scotland and Ireland from 1625 to 1649. Charles I was deposed during the English Civil War, and was beheaded, with the monarchy replaced by the Commonwealth of England. Charles was canonized by the Church of England in 1660.)

=== Last incidents in the writing ===
Although plunged into the writing of his novel, Dickens set out to create a new journal, Household Words, the first issue of which appeared on 31 March 1850. This daunting task, however, did not seem to slow down the writing of David Copperfield: I am "busy as a bee", he writes happily to the actor William Macready.

A serious incident occurred in December: Mrs Jane Seymour Hill, chiropractor to Mrs Dickens, raised the threat of prosecution, because she recognised herself in the portrait of Miss Mowcher; Dickens did not do badly, gradually modifying the psychology of the character by making her less of a caricature and, at the very end of the novel, by making her a friend of the protagonist, whereas at the beginning she served rather contrary purposes. This was, writes Harry Stone, "the only major departure from his original plans".

His third daughter was born on 16 August 1850, called Dora Annie Dickens, the same name as his character's first wife. The baby died nine months later after the last serial was issued and the book was published.

Dickens marked the end of his manuscript on 21 October 1850 and felt both torn and happy like every time he finished a novel: "Oh, my dear Forster, if I were to say half of what Copperfield makes me feel to-night, how strangely, even to you, I should be turned inside out! I seem to be sending some part of myself into the Shadowy World."

At first glance, the work is modelled in the loose and somewhat disjointed way of "personal histories" that was very popular in the United Kingdom of the 18th century; (Note: For example, those of Joseph Andrews or Tom Jones written by Henry Fielding, Dickens's favorite past author.) but in reality, David Copperfield is a carefully structured and unified novel. It begins, like other novels by Dickens, with a rather bleak painting of the conditions of childhood in Victorian England, notoriously when the troublesome children are parked in infamous boarding schools, then he strives to trace the slow social and intimate ascent of a young man who, painfully providing for the needs of his good aunt while continuing his studies, ends up becoming a writer: the story, writes Paul Davis, of "a Victorian everyman seeking self-understanding".

=== Publication in monthly instalments ===
"The Personal History, Adventures, Experience, and Observation of David Copperfield the Younger, of Blunderstone Rookery" (Note: A Rookery is a colony of birds, usually rooks. The term "rookery" was also used as a name for dense slum housing in nineteenth-century cities, especially in London.) was published from 1 May 1849 to 1 November 1850 in 19 monthly one-shilling instalments, containing 32 pages of text and two illustrations by Hablot Knight Browne ("Phiz"), with a title cover simplified to The Personal History of David Copperfield. The last instalment was a double-number.

On the other side of the Atlantic, John Wiley & Sons and G. P. Putnam published a monthly edition, then a two-volume book version.

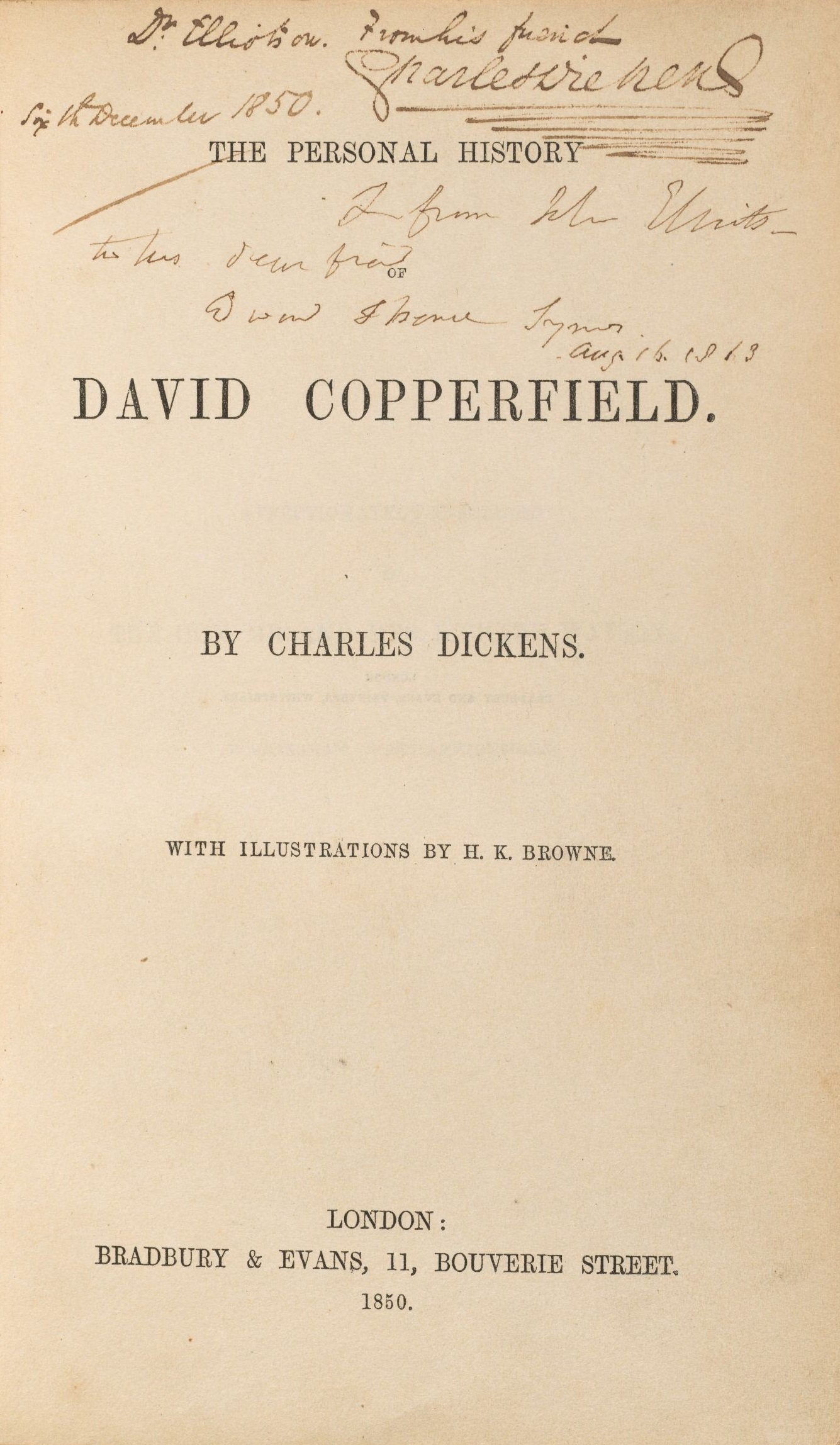
Title page of the first edition by Bradbury & Evans, signed by Dickens

- I – May 1849 (chapters 1–3);
- II – June 1849 (chapters 4–6);
- III – July 1849 (chapters 7–9);
- IV – August 1849 (chapters 10–12);
- V – September 1849 (chapters 13–15);
- VI – October 1849 (chapters 16–18);
- VII – November 1849 (chapters 19–21);
- VIII – December 1849 (chapters 22–24);
- IX – January 1850 (chapters 25–27);
- X – February 1850 (chapters 28–31);
- XI – March 1850 (chapters 32–34);
- XII – April 1850 (chapters 35–37);
- XIII – May 1850 (chapters 38–40);
- XIV – June 1850 (chapters 41–43);
- XV – July 1850 (chapters 44–46);
- XVI – August 1850 (chapters 47–50);
- XVII – September 1850 (chapters 51–53);
- XVIII – October 1850 (chapters 54–57);
- XIX–XX – November 1850 (chapters 58–64).

== Point of view ==
Whatever the borrowings from Dickens's own life, the reader knows as an essential precondition, that David Copperfield is a novel and not an autobiography; a work with fictional events and characters – including the hero-narrator – who are creations of Dickens's imagination.

=== First person narrator ===
The use of the first person determines the point of view: the narrator Copperfield, is a recognised writer, married to Agnes for more than ten years, who has decided to speak in public about his past life. This recreation, in itself an important act, can only be partial and also biased, since, a priori, Copperfield is the only viewpoint and the only voice; not enjoying the prerogatives of the third person, omnipotence, ubiquity, clairvoyance, he relates only what he witnessed or participated in: all the characters appear in his presence or, failing that, he learns through hearsay, before being subjected to his pen through the prism of his conscience, deformed by the natural deficit of his perception and accentuated by the selective filter of memory. Story teller and teacher, Copperfield does not let the facts speak for themselves, but constantly asserts himself as master of the narrative game, and he intervenes, explains, interprets and comments. His point of view is that of the adult he has become, as he expresses himself just as he is writing. At the end of his book, he feels a writer's pride to evoke "the thread[s] in the web I have spun".

Gareth Cordery writes that "if David Copperfield is the paradigmatic Bildungsroman, it is also the quintessential novel of memory" and as such, according to Angus Wilson, the equal of Marcel Proust's In Search of Lost Time (À la recherche du temps perdu). The memory of the hero engages so intensely with his memories that the past seems present:

How well I recollect the kind of day it was! I smell the fog that hung about the place; I see the hoar-frost, ghostly, through it; I feel my rimy hair fall clammy on my cheek; I look along the dim perspective of the schoolroom, with a sputtering candle here and there to light up the foggy morning, and the breath of the boys wreathing and smoking in the raw cold as they blow upon their fingers, and rap their feet upon the floor.

In such passages, which punctuate the retrospective chapters, the relived moment replaces the lived, the historical present seals the collapse of the original experience and the recreation of a here and now that seizes the entire field of consciousness. Sometimes this resurrected experience is more vivid than reality; so, in Chapter 41, about Traddles's face, he says: "His honest face, he looked at me with a serio-comic shake of his head impresses me more in the remembrance than it did in the reality." These are "sacred moments", writes Gareth Cordery, which Copperfield has carefully guarded in "the treasure chambers" (Note: The expression is from St Augustine who uses it at the end of the first part of his Confessions.) of his memory, where sings "the music of time": "secret prose, that sense of a mind speaking to itself with no one there to listen".

=== Commentary via the illustrations ===
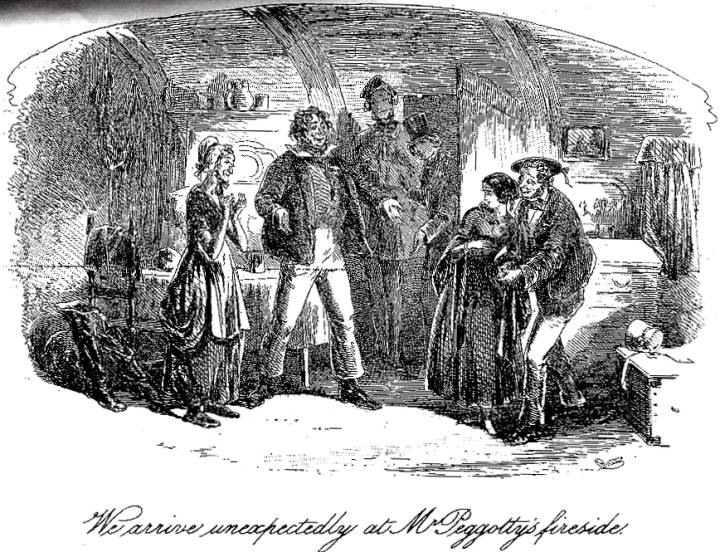
Sudden arrival at the Peggotty home; by Phiz

Without being Dickens, this narrator, Copperfield, is very like him and often becomes his spokesperson. It adds to his point of view, directly or indirectly, that of the author, without there necessarily being total match between the two. As such, Copperfield serves as "medium", mirror and also screen, Dickens sometimes subverting his speech to get to the forefront or, on the contrary, hide behind this elegant delegate to the nimble pen. Dickens's voice, however, is in general well concealed and, according to Gareth Cordery, the most difficult to detect because mostly present by implication. To help hear his voice, he adds, it is advisable to turn to Phiz, whose illustrations bring a point of view which is not always in agreement with that of Copperfield. For example, in chapter 21, the two friends arrive by surprise at the Peggotty home, and Copperfield presents Steerforth to Emily at the very moment when her betrothal with Ham has just been announced. This sudden intrusion stops the girl as she has just jumped from Ham's arms to nestle in those of Mr Peggotty, a sign, says Cordery in passing, that the promise of marriage is as much for the uncle as for the nephew. The text remains brief but Phiz interprets, anticipates the events, denounces even the future guilt of Copperfield: all eyes are on the girl, her bonnet, emblem of her social aspirations and her next wanderings with Steerforth, is ready to be seized. Copperfield, dressed as a gentleman, stands in the doorway, one finger pointing at Steerforth who is taller by one head, the other measuring the gap between Ham and Dan Peggotty, as if offering Emily to his friend. Emily, meanwhile, still has her head turned to Ham but the body is withdrawn and the look has become both challenging and provocative. Phiz brings together in a single image a whole bunch of unwritten information, which Dickens approved and probably even suggested.

=== Reader's insight ===
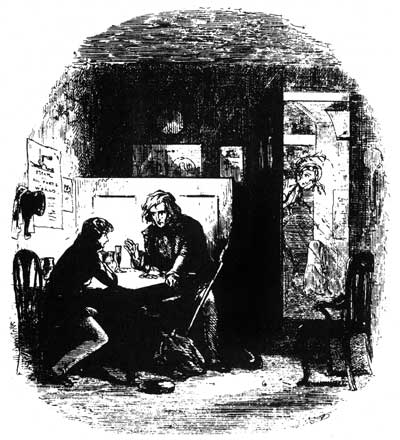
The Wanderer, Mr Peggotty talks to David as Martha overhears, by Phiz.

A third perspective is the point of view of the discerning reader who, although generally carried away by sympathy for the narrator's self-interested pleading, does not remain blissfully ignorant and ends up recognizing the faults of the man and of the writer, just as the reader also learns to identify and gauge the covert interventions of the author.

The discerning reader listens to the adult Copperfield and hears what this adult wants or does not want them to hear. "Even though this manuscript is intended for no eyes but mine", (chapter 42) the book exists, and the reader becomes ipso facto a "father-confessor", knowing how to judge and even, at times, to doubt the sincerity of the emotion expressed. So, when Dora dies, the reader sees that the topic of grief is dropped in a hurry, as if Copperfield had more important things to do than to indulge in sorrow: "this is not the time at which I am to enter a state of mind beneath its load of sorrow", which creates a question and an embarrassment: is Copperfield protecting himself from his confusion, or does he shed some crocodile tears for form?

Copperfield also examines some of his most culpable weaknesses, such as unconscious connivance (his "own unconscious part") in the defilement of the Peggotty home by Steerforth, which he remains forever incapable of opposing: "I believe that if I had been brought face to face with him, I could not have uttered one reproach."(chapter 32) The same treatment is given to his childhood love, his so much idealised Emily, who, once "fallen", is expelled from his consciousness to the point where his last comment, when he stealthily sees her aboard the ship leaving for Australia, is "a masterpiece of narrative duplicity": far from seeing in her what she has become, a real woman, he takes refuge behind the image of a pathetic religious icon elegantly allowing him to remove his own guilt for betraying her.

These underground currents are thus revealed in David's psychological struggle, Gareth Cordery concludes, currents that his narrative unconsciously attempts to disguise.

== Recapitulation of plot structure ==
=== The plot line ===
The story is a road from which different paths leave. The road is that of David's life, the main plot; the branches are born of meetings with him and lead to several secondary intrigues taken more or less far along. Each is represented by an important figure: Mr Micawber, Steerforth, little Emily, Uriah Heep; there are side stories, that of Martha Endell, Rosa Dartle, and, along the main road, stretch some parallel paths on which the reader is from time to time invited: the Traddles, Betsey Trotwood, the Peggotty family, Dan and Ham in particular, Peggotty herself remaining from start to finish intimately related to David. The different tracks do not move away from the main avenue, and when they do, a narrative "forceps" brings them together again. Hence the retrospective chapters and the ultimate recapitulation were written.

=== The necessary summaries ===
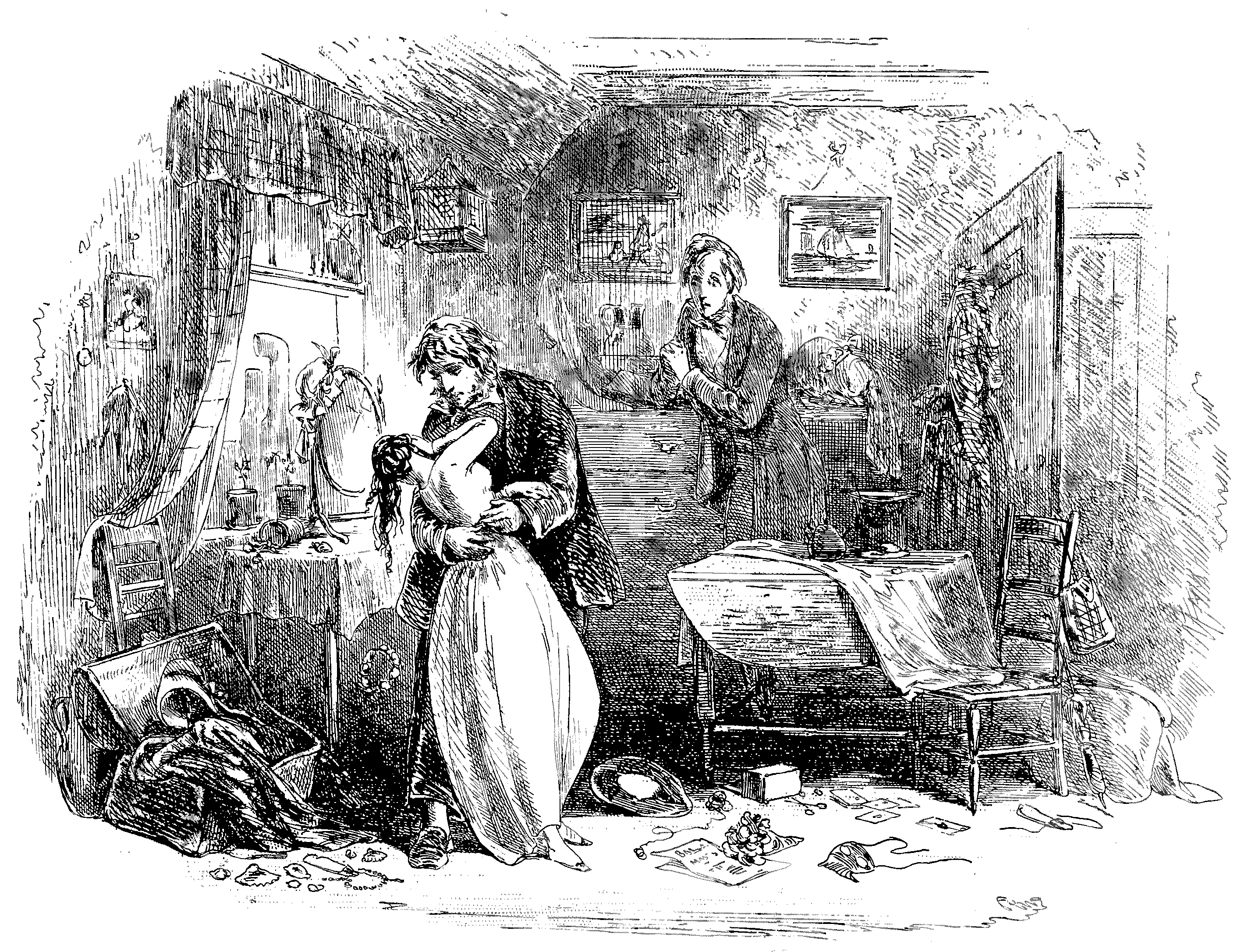
Mr Peggotty finds young Emily, by Phiz.

The narrative is linear in appearance, as is usual in traditional first-person form. It covers the narrator's life until the day he decides to put an end to his literary endeavor. However, whole sections of his life are summarised in a few paragraphs, or sometimes just a sentence or two, indicating that three or ten years have passed, or that Dora is dead, necessary to keep the story moving along. Thus, the long stay of reflection in Switzerland which leads to the recognition of love for Agnes, or the lapse of time before the final chapter, are all blanks in the story. Besides the hero, this story concerns important secondary characters such as Mr Micawber or Uriah Heep, or Betsey Trotwood and Traddles, the few facts necessary for a believable story are parsimoniously distilled in the final chapters: an impromptu visit to a prison, the unexpected return of Dan Peggotty from the Antipodes; so many false surprises for the narrator who needs them to complete each person's personal story. As such, the epilogue that represents the last chapter (Ch 64) is a model of the genre, a systematic review, presumably inspired by his memory, without true connection. There is the desire to finish with each one, with forced exclamations and ecstatic observations, scrolling through the lives of those who are frozen in time: Dick with his "Memorial" and his kite, Dr Strong and his dictionary, and as a bonus, the news of David's "least child", which implies that there have been other children between him and eldest child Agnes of whom the reader has never heard by name. So also goes the story of Dan Peggotty relating the sad tale of his niece. The four chapters called "Retrospect" (Chapter 18: "A Retrospect", Chapter 43: "Another Retrospect", Chapter 53: "Another Retrospect" and Chapter 64: "A Last Retrospect") are placed at strategic moments of the general discourse, which play a catch-up role more than one of meditation by the narrator, without venturing into event details. Here, the narration has disappeared, it has given way to a list, an enumeration of events.

=== Restructuring a posteriori ===
Dickens's approach, as shown in David Copperfield, does not escape what Georges Gusdorf calls "the original sin of autobiography", that is to say a restructuring a posteriori and in this, paradoxically, it demonstrates its authenticity. It consists of splitting one's life into parts, choosing decisive phases, identifying an evolution and endowing them with a direction and then a meaning, whereas, from day to day, existence has been lived as a cluster of shapeless perceptions requiring an immediate adaptation, that captures at best in the novel the use of the historical present generally adopted by Dickens. It is a succession of autonomous moments which do not end up amalgamating in a coherent whole and that connect the tenuous thread of the "I" recognizing each other. In this reconstruction, one part of truth and the other of poetry, the famous Dichtung und Wahrheit (From my Life: Poetry and Truth; 1811–1833), autobiography of Goethe, there is the obligatory absence of objectivity, the promotion of oblivion as an integral part of memory, the ruling power of the subjectivity of time found.

Thus, to use Georges Gusdorf's words again, David Copperfield appears as a "second reading of a man's experience", in this case, Charles Dickens, when he reached the fullness of his career, tried to give "a meaning to his legend".

== Themes ==
This novel's main theme arises from the fact that it is a bildungsroman, a literary genre that focuses on the psychological and moral growth of the protagonist from youth to adulthood, which is common in Dickens's novels, and in which character change is extremely important. The changes involve David leaving past selves behind on the way to maturity. Other important themes relate especially to Dickens's social concerns, and his desire for reform. This includes the plight of so-called "fallen women", and prostitutes, as well as the attitude of middle-class society to these women; the status of women in marriage; the rigid class structure; the prison system; educational standards, and emigration to the colonies of what was becoming the British Empire. The latter was a way for individuals to escape some of the rigidity of British society and start anew. Some of these subjects are directly satirized, while others are worked into the novel in more complex ways by Dickens.

=== Bildungsroman ===
==== Different names ====
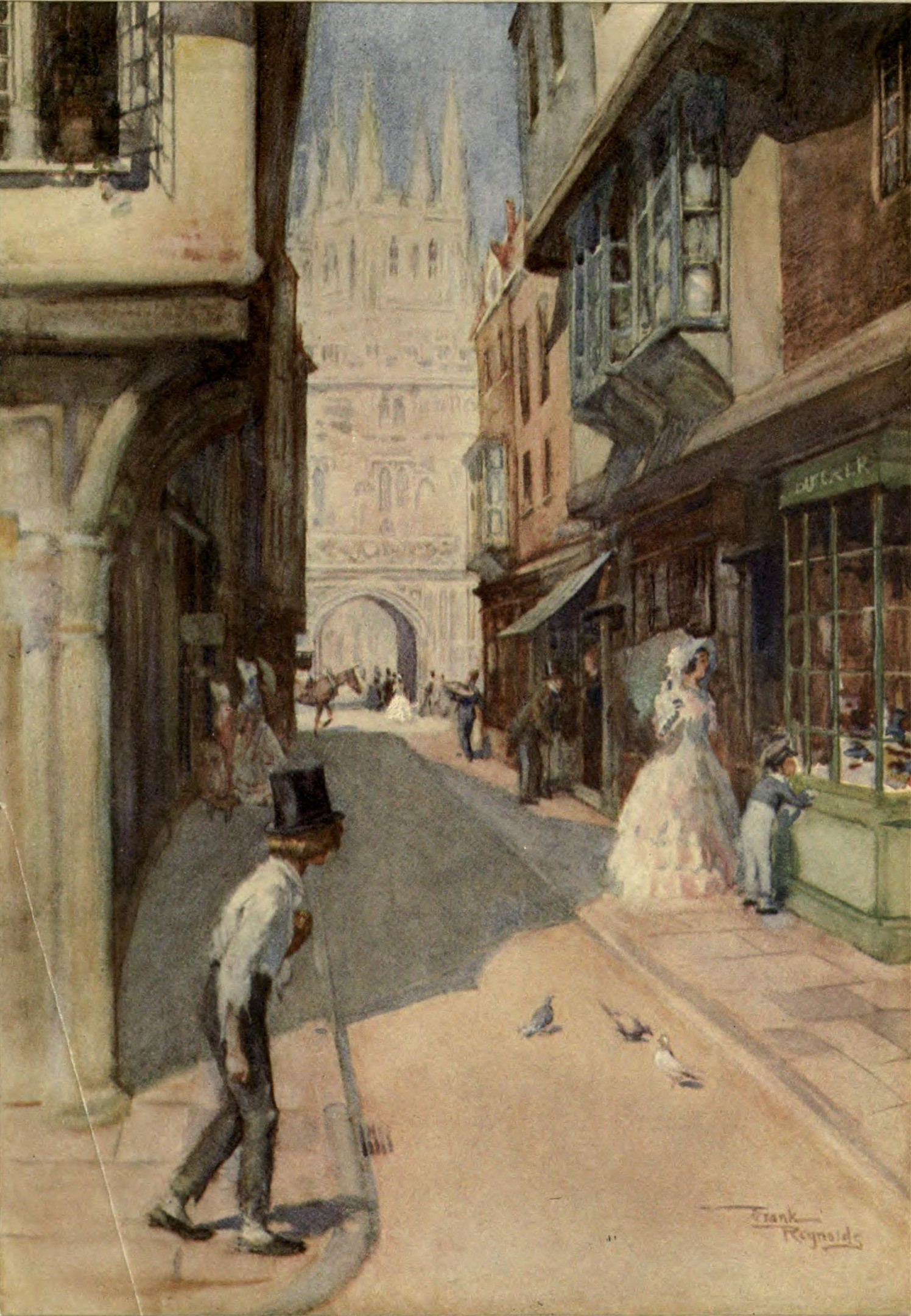
David reaches Canterbury, from David Copperfield, by Frank Reynolds

Copperfield's path to maturity is marked by the different names assigned to him: his mother calls him "Davy"; Murdstone calls him as "Brooks of Sheffield"; for Peggotty's family, he is "Mas'r Davy"; en route to boarding school from Yarmouth, he appears as "Master Murdstone"; at Murdstone and Grinby, he is known as "Master Copperfield"; Mr Micawber is content with "Copperfield"; for Steerforth he is "Daisy"; he becomes "Mister Copperfield" with Uriah Heep; and "Trotwood", soon shortened to "Trot" for Aunt Betsey; Mrs Crupp deforms his name into "Mr Copperfull"; and for Dora he is "Doady". While striving to earn his real name once and for all, this plethora of names reflects the fluidity of Copperfield's personal and social relationships, and obscure his real identity. It is by writing his own story, and giving him his name in the title, that Copperfield can finally assert who he is.

==== A series of lives ====
David's life can be seen as a series of lives, each one in radical disjunction from what follows, writes Paul Davis. The young boy in the warehouse differs from Blunderstone Rookery's child, or Salem House student, and overall David strives to keep these parts of himself disconnected from each other. For example, in Chapter 17, while attending Canterbury School, he met Mr Micawber at Uriah Heep's, and a sudden terror gripped him that Heep could connect him, such as he is today, and the abandoned child who lodged with the Micawber family in London.

So many mutations indicate the name changes, which are sometimes received with relief: "Trotwood Copperfield", when he finds refuge in Dover at his Aunt Betsey's house, so the narrator writes, "Thus I began my new life, in a new name, and with everything new about me." Then, he realised "that a remoteness had come upon the old Blunderstone life" and "that a curtain had for ever fallen on my life at Murdstone and Grinby's".

There is a process of forgetfulness, a survival strategy developed by memory, which poses a major challenge to the narrator; his art, in fact, depends on the ultimate reconciliation of differences in order to free and preserve the unified identity of his being a man.

==== "Will I be the hero of my own life?" ====
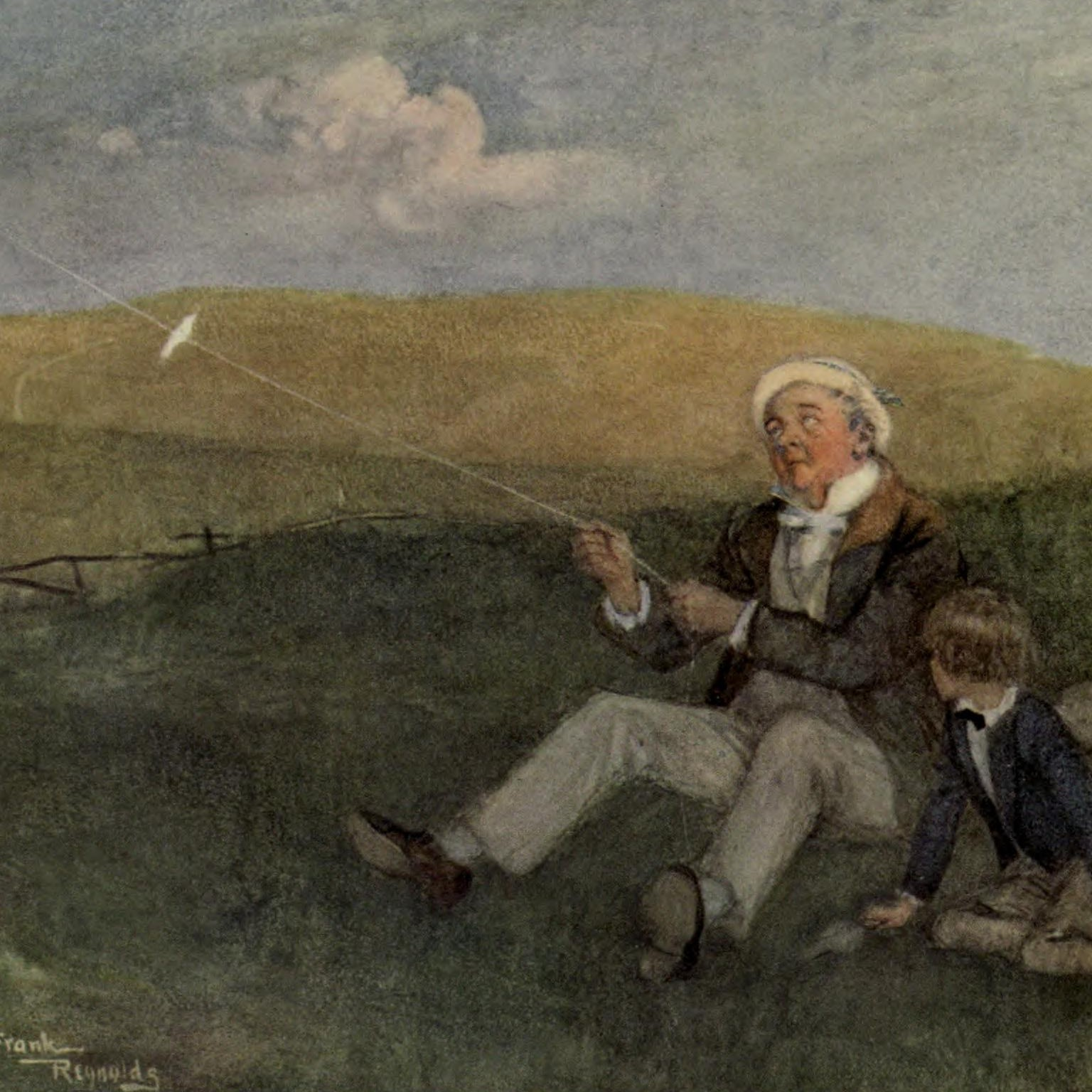
Mr Dick and his kite, from David Copperfield, by Frank Reynolds

David opens his story with a question: Will I be the hero of my own life? This means that he does not know where his approach will lead him, that writing itself will be the test. As Paul Davis puts it, "In this Victorian quest narrative, the pen might be lighter than the sword, and the reader will be left to judge those qualities of the man and the writer that constitute heroism.

However, question implies an affirmation: it is Copperfield, and no one else, who will determine his life, the future is delusory, since the games are already played, the life has been lived, with the novel being only the story. Copperfield is not always the hero of his life, and not always the hero of his story, as some characters have a stronger role than him, Besides Steerforth, Heep, Micawber, for example, he often appears passive and lightweight. Hence, concludes Paul Davis, the need to read his life differently; it is more by refraction through other characters that the reader has a true idea of the "hero" of the story. What do these three men reveal to him, and also to Dora, whom he marries? Another possible yardstick is a comparison with the other two "writers" of the novel, Dr Strong and Mr Dick. The dictionary of Strong will never be completed and, as a story of a life, will end with the death of its author. As for Mr Dick, his autobiographical project constantly raises the question of whether he can transcend the incoherence and indecision of his subject-narrator. Will he be able to take the reins, provide a beginning, a middle, an end? Will he succeed in unifying the whole, in overcoming the trauma of the past, his obsession with the decapitated royal head, so as to make sense of the present and find a direction for the future? According to Paul Davis, only Copperfield succeeds in constructing a whole of his life, including suffering and failure, as well as successes, and that is "one measure of his heroism as a writer".

==== The weight of the past ====
The past "speaks" especially to David, "a child of close observation" (chapter 2); the title of this chapter is: "I observe", and as an adult he is endowed with a remarkable memory. So much so that the story of his childhood is realised so concretely that the narrator, like the reader, sometimes forgets that it is a lived past and not a present that is given to see. The past tense verb is often the preterite for the narrative, and the sentences are often short independent propositions, each one stating a fact. Admittedly, the adult narrator intervenes to qualify or provide an explanation, without, however, taking precedence over the child's vision. And sometimes, the story is prolonged by a reflection on the functioning of the memory. So, again in chapter 2, the second and third paragraphs comment on the first memory of the two beings surrounding David, his mother, and Peggotty:

I believe I can remember these two at a little distance apart, dwarfed to my sight by stooping or kneeling on the floor, and I going unsteadily from the one to the other. I have an impression on my mind, which I cannot distinguish from actual remembrance, of the touch of Peggotty's forefinger as she used to hold it out to me, and of its being roughened by needlework, like a pocket nutmeg-grater.
This may be fancy, though I think the memory of most of us can go further back into such times than many of us suppose; just as I believe the power of observation in numbers of very young children to be quite wonderful for its closeness and accuracy. Indeed, I think that most grown men who are remarkable in this respect may with greater propriety be said not to have lost the faculty than to have acquired it; the rather, as I generally observe such men to retain a certain freshness, and gentleness, and capacity of being pleased, which are also an inheritance they have preserved from their childhood.

David thus succeeds, as George Orwell puts it, in standing "both inside and outside a child's mind", a particularly important double vision effect in the first chapters. The perspective of the child is combined with that of the adult narrator who knows that innocence will be violated and the feeling of security broken. Thus, even before the intrusion of Mr Murdstone as step-father or Clara's death, the boy feels "intimations of mortality". In the second chapter for example, when David spends a day with Mr Murdstone, during the first episode of "Brooks of Sheffield" (Note: Word play containing the verb "brook", meaning "endure," and the town of "Sheffield," famous for the manufacture of cutlery. Hence Mr Murdstone's joke, "take care, if you please. Somebody's sharp".) in which, first blow to his confidence, he realises little by little that Mr Murdstone and his comrade Quinion are mocking him badly:

'That's Davy,' returned Mr Murdstone.
'Davy who?' said the gentleman. 'Jones?'
'Copperfield' said Mr Murdstone.
'What! Bewitching Mrs Copperfield's incumbrance?' cried the gentleman. 'The pretty little widow?'
'Quinion,' said Mr Murdstone, 'take care, if you please. Somebody's sharp.'
'Who is?' asked the gentleman laughing.
I looked up quickly, being curious to know.
'Only Brooks of Sheffield', said Mr Murdstone.
I was quite relieved to find that it was only Brooks of Sheffield, for, at first, I really thought it was I.

There seemed to be something very comical in the reputation of Mr Brooks of Sheffield, for both the gentlemen laughed heartily when he was mentioned, and Mr Murdstone was a good deal amused also.

The final blow, brutal and irremediable this time, is the vision, in chapter 9, of his own reflection in his little dead brother lying on the breast of his mother: "The mother who lay in the grave was the mother of my infancy; the little creature in her arms was myself, as I had once been, hushed forever on her bosom".

==== A series of male models for David ====
David Copperfield is a posthumous child, that is, he was born after his father died. From birth, his aunt is the authority who stands in for the deceased father, and she decides Copperfield's identity by abandoning him because he is not female. His first years are spent with women, two Claras, (Note: The connotations of the first name "Clara" are clarity, transparency, brightness.) his mother and Peggotty, which, according to Paul Davis, "undermines his sense of masculinity". Hence a sensitivity that the same critic calls "feminine", made-up of a lack of confidence, naive innocence and anxiety, like that of his mother, who was herself an orphan. Steerforth is not mistaken, when from the outset he calls Copperfield "Daisy"–a flower of spring, symbol of innocent youth. To forge an identity as a man and learn how to survive in a world governed by masculine values, instinctively, he looks for a father figure who can replace that of the father he did not have.

Several male models will successively offer themselves to him: the adults Mr Murdstone, Mr Micawber and Uriah Heep, his comrades Steerforth and Traddles.

===== Mr Murdstone =====
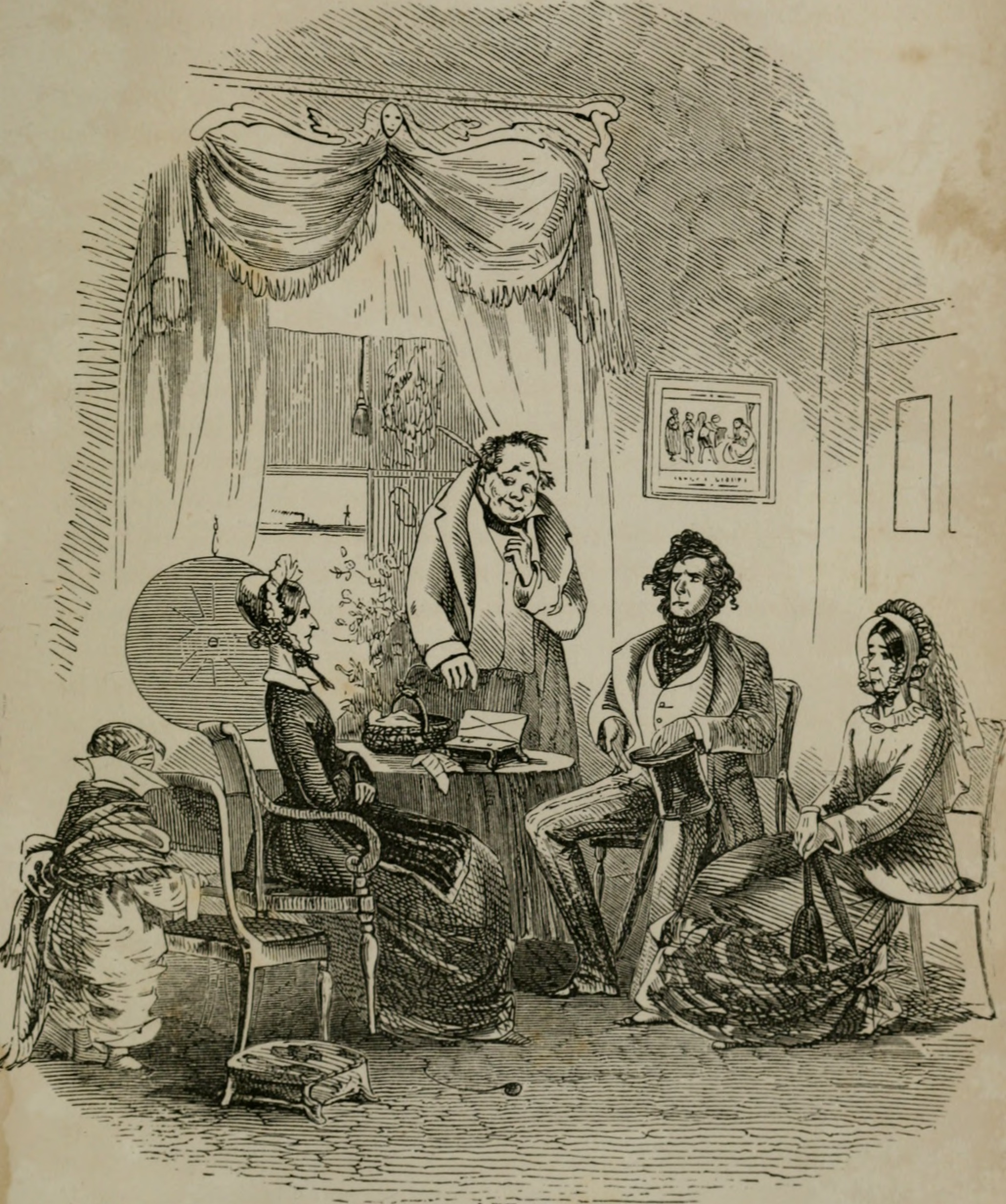
Aunt Betsey & Mr Dick say no to Mr Murdstone and his sister, by Phiz.

Mr Murdstone darkens Copperfield's life instead of enlightening him, because the principle of firmness which he champions, absolute novelty for the initial family unit, if he instills order and discipline, kills spontaneity and love. The resistance that Copperfield offers him is symbolic: opposing a usurper without effective legitimacy, he fails to protect his mother but escapes the straitjacket and achieves his independence. Mr Murdstone thus represents the anti-father, double negative of the one of which David was deprived, model a contrario of what it is not necessary to be.

===== Mr Micawber =====
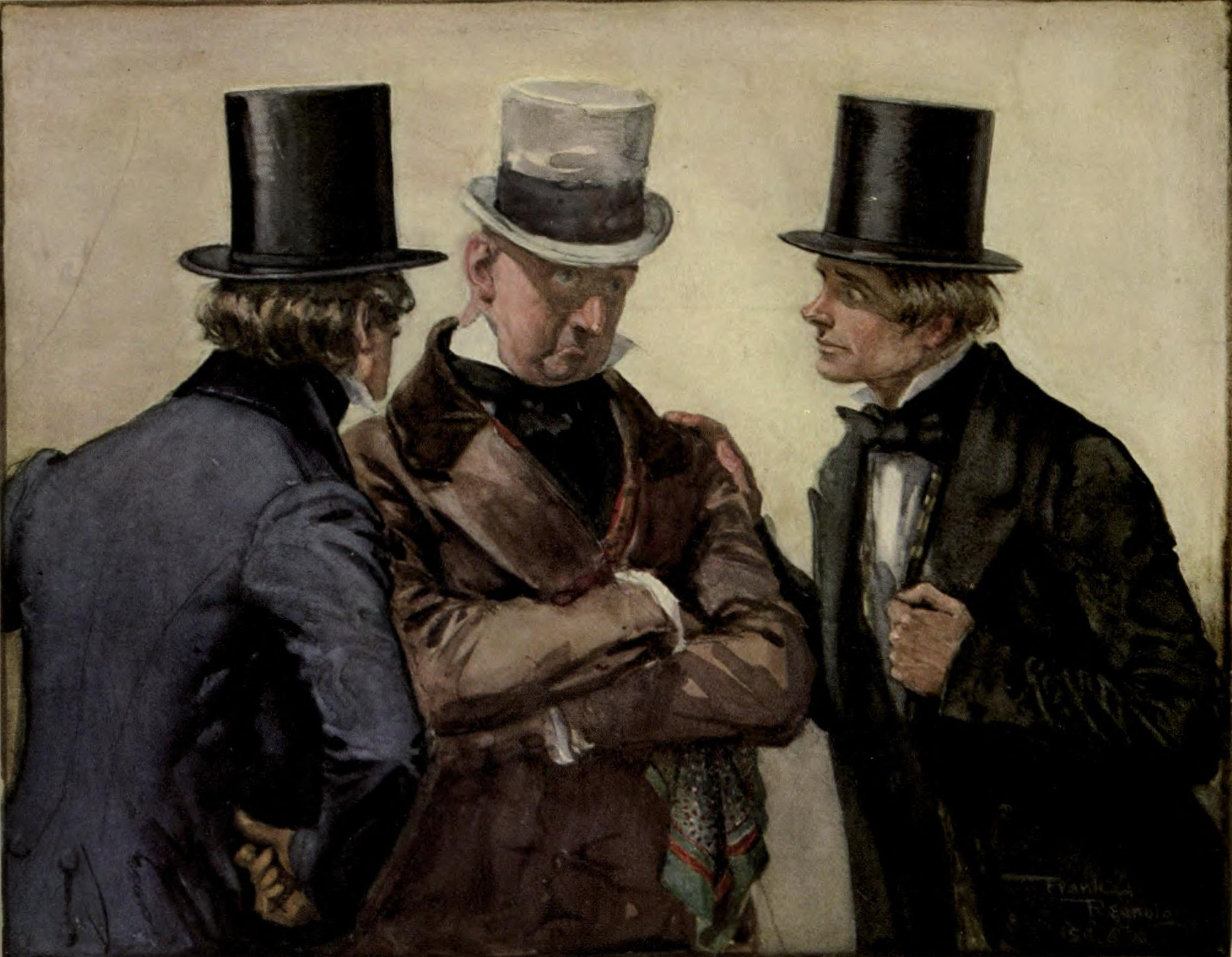
Traddles, Micawber and David from David Copperfield, by Frank Reynolds

The second surrogate father is just as ineffective, although of a diametrically opposed personality: it is Mr Micawber who, for his part, lacks firmness to the point of sinking into irresponsibility. Overflowing with imagination and love, in every way faithful and devoted, inveterate optimist, he eventually becomes, in a way, the child of David who helps him to alleviate his financial difficulties. The roles are reversed and, by the absurdity, David is forced to act as a man and to exercise adult responsibilities towards him. However, the Micawbers are not lacking in charm, the round Wilkins, of course, but also his dry wife, whose music helps her to live. Mrs Micawber has, since childhood, two songs in her repertoire, the Scottish "The dashing white sergeant" and the American lament "The little Tafflin with the Silken Sash", whose attraction has decided her husband to "win that woman or perish in the attempt" In addition to the melodies that soothe and embellish, the words of the second, with her dream "Should e'er the fortune be my lot to be made a wealthy bride!" and her aphorism "Like attracts like" have become emblematic of the couple, one is the opposite of reality and the other the very definition of its harmony.

===== Uriah Heep =====
New avatar of this quest, Uriah Heep is "a kind of negative mirror to David". Heep is clever at enlarging the pathos of his humble origins, for example, which ability he exploits shamelessly to attract sympathy and mask an unscrupulous ambition; while David, on the other hand, tends to suppress his modest past and camouflage his social ambitions under a veneer of worldly mistrust, prompting Paul Davis to conclude that, just as Mr Murdstone is adept at firmness, Heep, in addition to being a rascal, lacks the so-called feminine qualities of sensitivity which David does not lose.

===== Steerforth =====
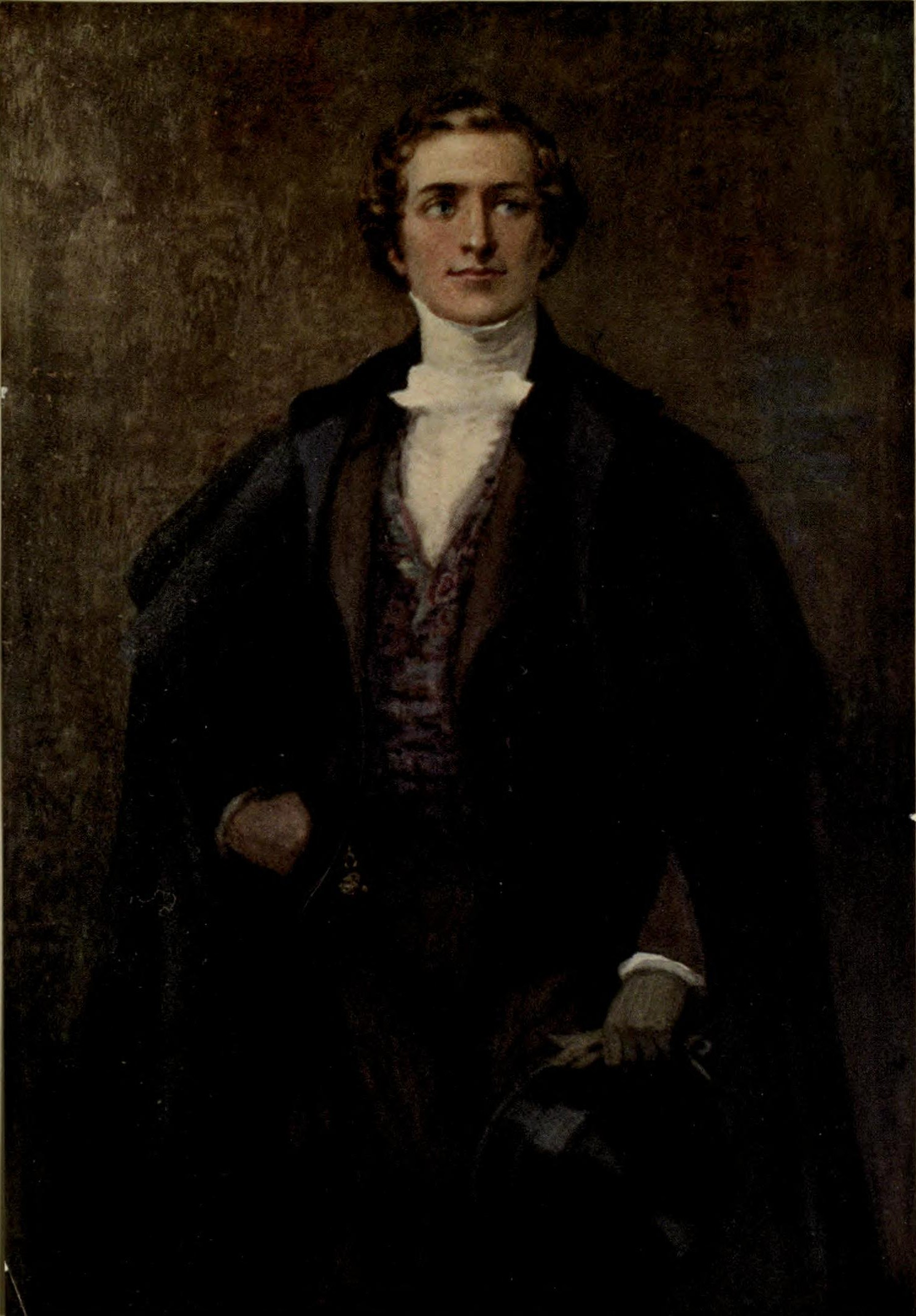
Steerforth from David Copperfield, by Frank Reynolds

For David, Steerforth represents all that Heep is not: born a gentleman, with no stated ambition or defined life plan, he has a natural presence and charisma that immediately give him scope and power. However, his failure as a model is announced well before the episode at Yarmouth where he seizes, like a thief, Little Emily before causing her loss in Italy. He already shows himself as he is, brutal, condescending, selfish and sufficient, towards Rosa Dartle, bruised by him for life, and Mr Mell who undergoes the assaults of his cruelty. The paradox is that even as he gauges his infamy, David remains from start to finish dazzled by Steerforth's aristocratic ascendancy, even as he contemplates him drowning on Yarmouth Beach, "lying with his head upon his arm, as I had often seen him at school".

===== Traddles =====
Traddles, the anti-Steerforth, is the same age as David, not very brilliant at school, but wise enough to avoid the manipulations to which David succumbs. His attraction to moderation and reserve assures him the strength of character that David struggles to forge. Neither rich nor poor, he must make a place for himself in the world, at which he succeeds by putting love and patience at the centre of his priorities, the love that tempers the ambition and the patience that moderates the passion. His ideal is to achieve justice in his actions, which he ends up implementing in his profession. In the end, Traddles, in his modesty, represents the best male model available to David.

There are others, Daniel Peggotty for example, all love and dedication, who goes in search of his lost niece and persists in mountains and valleys, beyond the seas and continents, to find her trace. Mr Peggotty is the anti-Murdstone par excellence, but his influence is rather marginal on David, as his absolute excellence, like the maternal perfection embodied by his sister Peggotty, makes him a character type more than an individual to refer to. There is also the carter Barkis, original, laconic and not without defects, but a man of heart. He too plays a role in the personal history of the hero, but in a fashion too episodic to be significant, especially since he dies well before the end of the story.

==== The hard path to the right balance ====
It is true that David's personal story makes it more difficult for him to access the kind of equilibrium that Traddles presents, because it seems destined, according to Paul Davis, to reproduce the errors committed by his parents. So, without knowing it, he looks a lot like his late father, also named David, who, according to Aunt Betsey, had eyes only for the flower-women, and, as such, he finds himself as irresistibly attracted to Dora whose delicate and charming femininity, the sweet frivolity too, recall those of his diaphanous mother. The chapters describing their loves are among the best in the novel because Dickens manages to capture the painful ambivalence of David, both passionately infatuated with the irresistible young woman, to whom we can only pass and forgive everything, and frustrated by his weak character and his absolute ignorance of any discipline. For love, the supreme illusion of youth, he tries to change it, to "form her mind", which leads him to recognize that "firmness" can to be a virtue which, ultimately, he needs. However, finding himself in a community of thought, even distantly, with his hateful and cruel stepfather whom he holds responsible for the death of his mother and a good deal of his own misfortunes, it was a troubling discovery.

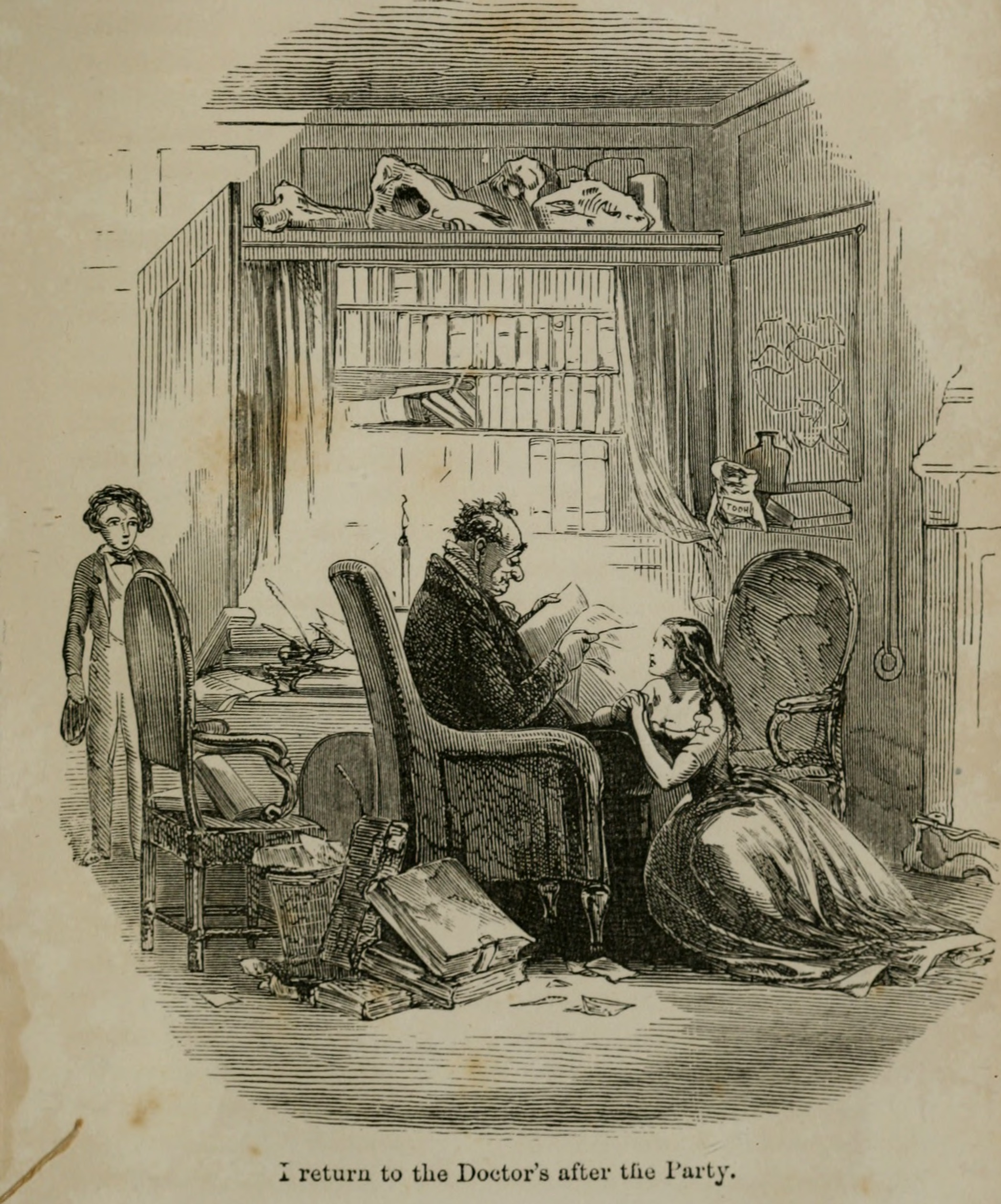
Dr Strong and his young wife Annie, by Phiz

It is his aunt Betsey who, by her character, represents the struggle to find the right balance between firmness and gentleness, rationality and empathy. Life forced Betsey Trotwood to assume the role she did not want, that of a father, and as such she became, but in her own way, adept at steadfastness and discipline. From an initially culpable intransigence, which led her to abandon the newborn by denouncing the incompetence of the parents not even capable of producing a girl, she finds herself gradually tempered by circumstances and powerfully helped by the "madness" of her protege, Mr Dick. He, between two flights of kites that carry away the fragments of his personal history, and without his knowing it, plays a moderating role, inflecting the rationality of his protector by his own irrationality, and his cookie-cutter judgments by considerations of seeming absurdity, but which, taken literally, prove to be innate wisdom. In truth, Aunt Betsey, despite her stiffness and bravado, does not dominate her destiny; she may say she can do it, yet she cannot get David to be a girl, or escape the machinations of Uriah Heep any more than the money demands of her mysterious husband. She also fails, in spite of her lucidity, her clear understanding, of the love blindness of her nephew, to prevent him from marrying Dora and in a parallel way, to reconcile the Strongs. In fact, in supreme irony, it is once again Mr Dick who compensates for his inadequacies, succeeding with intuition and instinctive understanding of things, to direct Mr Micawber to save Betsey from the clutches of Heep and also to dispel the misunderstandings of Dr Strong and his wife Annie.

As often in Dickens where a satellite of the main character reproduces the course in parallel, the story of the Strong couple develops in counterpoint that of David and Dora. While Dora is in agony, David, himself obsessed with his role as a husband, observes the Strongs who are busy unraveling their marital distress. Two statements made by Annie Strong impressed him: in the first, she told him why she rejected Jack Maldon and thanked her husband for saving her "from the first impulse of an undisciplined heart". The second was like a flash of revelation: "There can be no disparity in marriage like unsuitability of mind and purpose". At the end of chapter 45, almost entirely devoted to the epilogue of this affair, David meditates on these words which he repeats several times and whose relevance, applied to his own case, is imposed on him. He concludes that in all things, discipline tempered by kindness and kindness is necessary for the equilibrium of a successful life. Mr Murdstone preached firmness; in that, he was not wrong. Where he cruelly failed was that he matched it with selfish brutality instead of making it effective by the love of others.

==== The happiness of maturity with Agnes ====
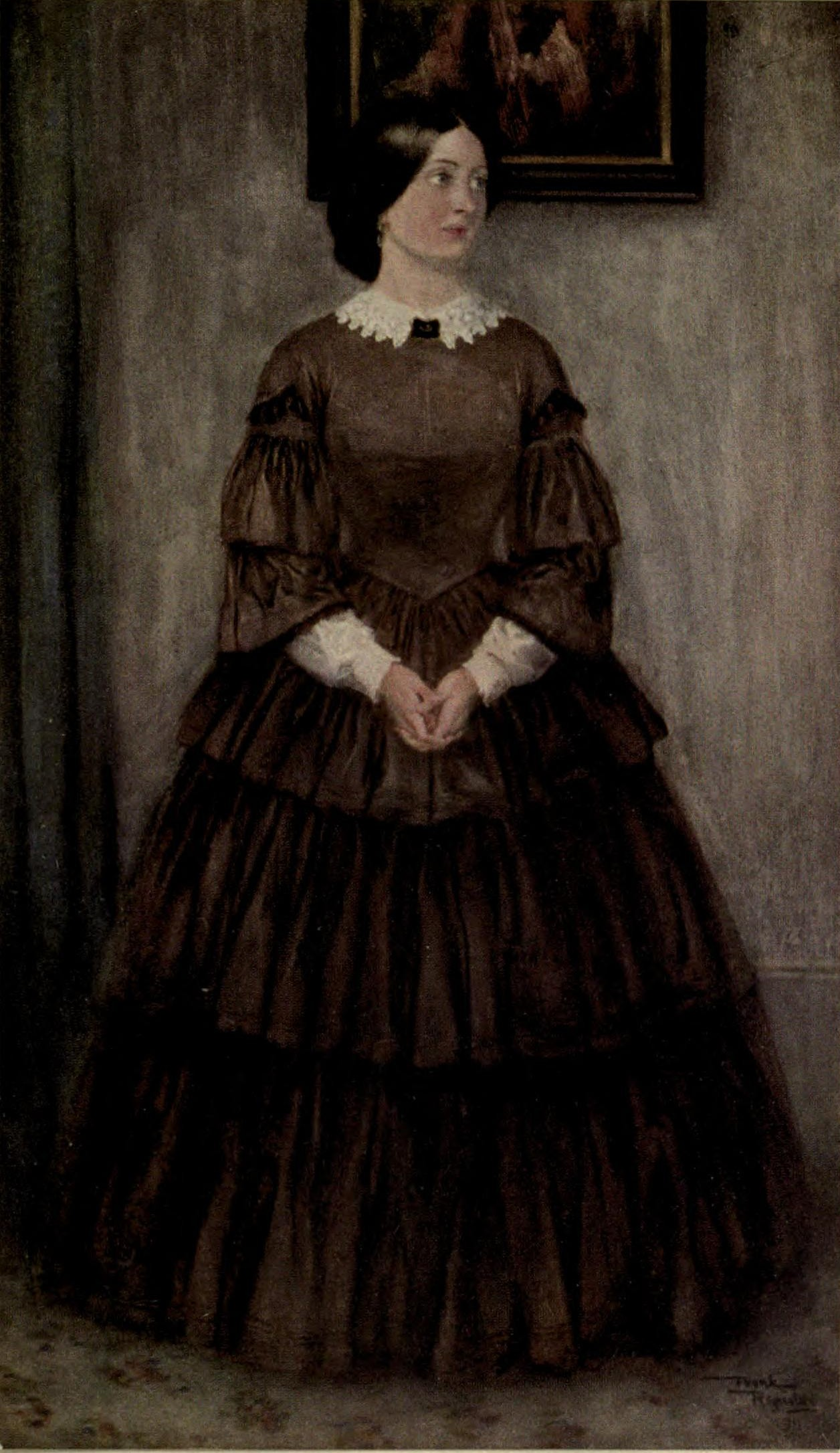
Agnes Wickfield, David's second wife, by Frank Reynolds

It is because David has taken stock of his values and accepted the painful memories of Dora's death, that he is finally ready to go beyond his emotional blindness and recognize his love for Agnes Wickfield, the one he already has called the "true heroine" of the novel to which he gives his name. Paul Davis writes that Agnes is surrounded by an aura of sanctity worthy of a stained glass window, that she is more a consciousness or an ideal than a person, that, certainly, she brings the loving discipline and responsibility of which the hero needs, but lacks the charm and human qualities that made Dora so attractive. Adrienne E Gavin, nuancing the point, writes that she is neither more nor less caricature than other young women in the hero's life: if Emily is a stereotype of the "lost woman" and Dora of "woman-child", Agnes is that of "ideal Victorian woman", which necessarily limits, for her as for the others, the possibilities of evolution, the only change available from a loving and devoted daughter to a loving and devoted wife.

That said, the writer David, now David Copperfield, realised the vow expressed to Agnes (when he was newly in love with Dora, in Chapter 35. Depression): "If I had a conjurer's cap, there is no one I should have wished but for you". At the end of his story, he realises that the conjurer's cap is on his head, that he can draw his attention to the people he loves and trusts. Thus, David Copperfield is the story of a journey through life and through oneself, but also, by the grace of the writer, the recreation of the tenuous thread uniting the child and the adult, the past and the present, in what Georges Gusdorf calls "fidelity to the person". or, as Robert Ferrieux said,

le corps chaud de l'être personnel

Translation:

the warm body of the personal being

=== Social questions ===
Admittedly, it is not the primary interest of David Copperfield that remains above all the story of a life told by the very one who lived it, but the novel is imbued with a dominant ideology, that of the middle class, advocating moral constancy, hard work, separate spheres for men and women, and, in general, the art of knowing one's place, indeed staying in that place. Further, some social problems and repeated abuses being topical, Dickens took the opportunity to expose them in his own way in his fiction, and Trevor Blount, in his introduction to the 1966 edition Penguin Classics, reissued in 1985, devotes several pages to this topic.

However, Gareth Cordery shows that behind the display of Victorian values, often hides a watermarked discourse that tends to question, test, and even subvert them. There are therefore two possible readings, the one that remains on the surface and another that questions below this surface, the implicit questions.

Among the social issues that David Copperfield is concerned with, are prostitution, the prison system, education, as well as society's treatment of the insane.

Dickens's views on education are reflected in the contrast he makes between the harsh treatment that David receives at the hands of Creakle at Salem House and Dr Strong's school where the methods used inculcate honour and self–reliance in its pupils.

Through the character of "the amiable, innocent, and wise fool" Mr Dick, Dickens's "advocacy in the humane treatment of the insane" can be seen. Mr Dick's brother

didn't like to have him visible about his house, and sent him away to some private asylum-place: though he had been left to his particular care by their deceased father, who thought him almost a natural. And a wise man he must have been to think so! Mad himself, no doubt.

So Betsey Trotwood, continuing Mr Dick's story in Chapter 14, stepped in to suggest that Mr Dick should be given "his little income, and come and live with" her: "I am ready to take care of him, and shall not ill-treat him as some people (besides the asylum-folks) have done."

==== Victorian child exploitation ====
The employment of young children in factories and mines under harsh conditions in the early Victorian era disturbed many. There was a series of Parliamentary enquiries into the working conditions of children, and these "reports shocked writers Elizabeth Barrett Browning and Charles Dickens." Dickens describes children working in factories or other workplaces in several novels, notably in Oliver Twist, and in David Copperfield. Young David works in a factory for a while after his mother dies and his stepfather showed no interest in him. Such depictions contributed to the call for legislative reform.

==== Prison discipline ====
Dickens satirises contemporary ideas about how prisoners should be treated in Chapter 61, 'I am Shown Two Interesting Penitents'. In this chapter, published in November 1850, David along with Traddles is shown around a large well-built new prison, modelled on Pentonville prison (built in 1842), where a new, supposedly more humane, system of incarceration is in operation, under the management of David's former headmaster Creakle. A believer in firmness, Dickens denounced comically the system of isolating prisoners in separate cells, the "separate system", and giving them healthy and pleasant food. (Note: Dickens ridiculed the way it worked, lamenting that detainees were better treated than the poor or even non-commissioned soldiers.) His satire appeals directly to the public, already warned by the long controversy over the prison discipline in the press. Mr Creakle is very proud of this new system, but his enthusiasm is immediately undermined by the reminder of his former ferocity as a school principal. In the prison David and Traddles encounter 'model prisoners' 27 and 28, who they discover are Uriah Heep and Mr Littimer. Heep is seen reading a hymn book and Littimer also "walked forth, reading a good book": both have managed to convince the naïve Creakle, and his fellow magistrates, that they have seen the error of their ways. Both are questioned about the quality of the food and Creakle promises improvements.

Dickens's ideas in this chapter were in line with Carlyle, whose pamphlet, "Model Prisons", also denounced Pentonville Prison, was published in the spring of 1850. Indeed, Dickens had published anonymously, a month after Carlyle's pamphlet on the same subject, "Pet Prisonners".

==== Emigration to Australia ====
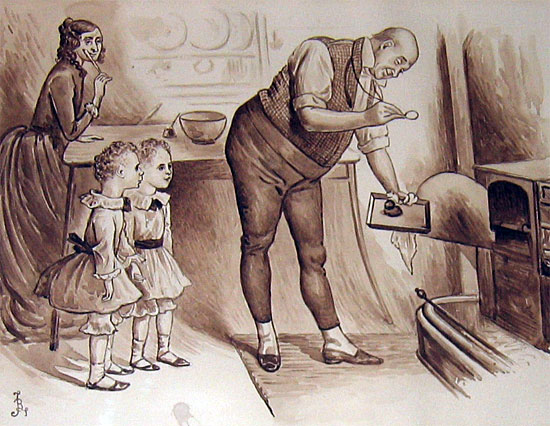
Mr Micawber and the art of baking, with Mrs Micawber and the twins, by Fred Barnard.

Dickens's exploration of the subject of emigration in the novel has been criticised, initially by John Forster and later by G. K. Chesterton. Chesterton accused Dickens of presenting emigration in an excessively optimistic light, arguing that Dickens believed that by sending a boatload of people overseas their 'souls' can be changed, while ignoring the fact that poor people like Peggotty have seen their home stained or, like Emily, their honour tarnished. Micawber has been broken by the English social system, his journey to the antipodes is paid for by a paragon of the Victorian bourgeoisie, Betsey Trotwood and he is supposed to regain control of his destiny once he has arrived in Australia. Trevor Blount points out that the word 'soul' has a different meaning for Dickens than Chesterton. Dickens cares about material and psychological happiness, and is convinced that physical well-being is a comfort for life's wounds.

Dickens sent his characters to America in Nicholas Nickleby and Martin Chuzzlewit, but he has the Peggotty and Micawber families emigrate to Australia. This approach was part of the official policy of the 1840s, focusing on Australia as a land of welcome. It was at this time necessary to stimulate interest in the new colony and propagandists arrived in England in particular John Dunmore Lang and Caroline Chisholm from Australia. Dickens was only following this movement and, in any case, had faith in family colonisation. Moreover, the idea that redemption could be achieved by such a new start in a person's life was a preoccupation of the author, and he saw here subject matter to charm his readers.

From the point of view of the novel's inner logic, in order for Copperfield to complete his psychological maturation and exist independently, Dickens must expel his surrogate fathers, including Peggotty and Micawber, and emigration is an easy way to remove them.

==== Visions for society ====
The episode in the prison, according to novelist Angus Wilson, is more than a piece of journalism; it represents Dickens's vision of the society in which he lives. The same can be said of the episodes concerning prostitution and emigration, which illuminate the limits of Copperfield's moral universe and Dickens's own uncertainties. That everything is put in order in Australia, that Martha marries a man from the bush, that Emily, in the strong arms of Dan Peggotty, becomes a lady of good works, that Micawber, who had been congenitally insolvent, suddenly acquires the management skills and becomes prosperous in dispensing justice. All these conversions are somewhat 'ironic', and tend to undermine the hypothesis of 'a Dickens believing in the miracle of the antipodes', which Jane Rogers considers in her analysis of the 'fallen woman' as a plot device to gain the sympathy of Dickens's readers for Emily.

==== The middle-class ideology ====
John Forster, Dickens's early biographer, praises the bourgeois or middle-class values and ideology found in David Copperfield. Like him the Victorian reading public shared Copperfield's complacent views, expressed with the assurance of success that is his, at the end, as a recognized writer who is happy in marriage and safe from need.

Gateth Cordery takes a close look at class consciousness. According to him, Copperfield's relationship with aristocrat Steerforth and the humble Uriah Heep is "crucial". From the beginning, Copperfield ranks as and is considered by his friends among the good people. The Peggotty family, in Chapter 3, treat him with respect, "as a visitor of distinction"; even at Murdstone and Grinby, his behaviour and clothes earned him the title of "the little gentleman". When he reached adulthood, he naturally enjoyed Steerforth's disdain for Ham as a simple "joke about the poor". So he is predisposed to succumb, by what he calls in chapter 7 an "inborn power of attraction", to the charm instinctively lent to beautiful people, about which David said "a kind of enchantment ... to which it was a natural weakness to yield." From start to finish, David remains fascinated by Steerforth, so he aspires inwardly to his social status.

In parallel there is a contempt of the upstart, Heep, hatred of the same nature as Copperfield's senseless adoration for Steerforth, but inverted. That "'umble" Heep goes from a lowly clerk to an associate at Wickfield's, to claiming to win the hand of Agnes, daughter of his boss, is intolerable to David, though it is very similar to his own efforts to go from shorthand clerk to literary fame, with Dora Spenlow, the daughter of his employer. Heep's innuendo that Copperfield is no better than him feeds on the disdain in which he holds Heep as of right: "Copperfield, you've always been an upstart", an honesty of speech, comments Cordery, of which Copperfield himself is incapable.

==== Marriage ====
Another concern of Dickens is the institution of marriage and in particular, the unenviable place occupied by women. Whether at the home of Wickfield, Strong, or under the Peggotty boat, women are vulnerable to predators or intruders like Uriah Heep, Jack Maldon, and James Steerforth; Murdstone's firmness prevails up to the death of two wives; with David and Dora complete incompetence reigns; and at the Micawber household, love and chaos go hand in hand; while Aunt Betsey is subjected to blackmail by her mysterious husband. Dickens, according to Gareth Cordery, clearly attacks the official status of marriage, which perpetuated an inequality between the sexes, an injustice that does not end with the separation of couples.

The mid-Victorian era saw a change in gender roles for men and women, in part forced by the factories and separation of work and home, which made stereotypes of the woman at home and the man working away from home. Values, like the imperative need for women to marry and to be that ideal described as The Angel in the House (manages the home without aid and is always calm) are "interrogated, tested and even subverted", for example by having one mother-figure be the character Betsey Trotwood, who is not a mother. When seeming to describe a stereotypical image in particularly the female characters, the story "does so in a way that reflects the fault-lines of the image."

Anne Brontë in The Tenant of Wildfell Hall (1848) explores this iniquity in the status of the character Helen Graham, separated from her alcoholic husband. Dickens's understanding of the burden on women in marriage in this novel contrasts with his treatment of his own wife Catherine, whom he expected to be an Angel in the House.

==== The fallen woman ====
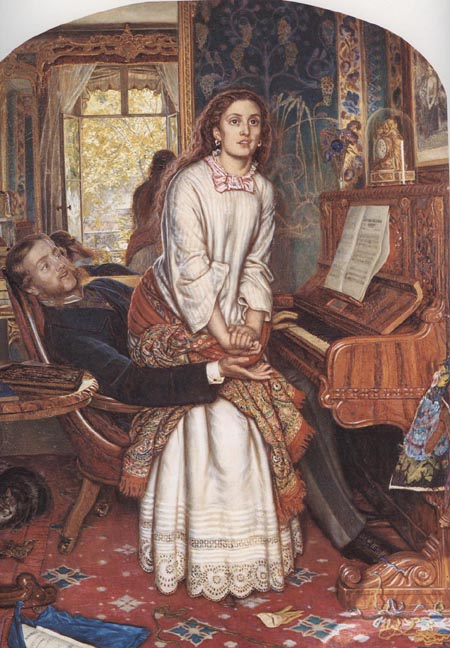
The Awakening Conscience, William Holman Hunt (1851–1853)

Martha Endell and Emily Peggotty, the two friends in Yarmouth who work at the undertaker's house, reflect Dickens's commitment to "save" so-called fallen women. Dickens was co-founder with Angela Burdett-Coutts of Urania Cottage, a home for young women who had "turned to a life of immorality", including theft and prostitution. On the eve of her wedding to her cousin and fiancé, Ham, Emily abandons him for Steerforth. After Steerforth deserts her, she doesn't go back home, because she has disgraced herself and her family. Her uncle, Mr Peggotty, finds her in London on the brink of being forced into prostitution. So that she may have a fresh start away from her now degraded reputation, she and her uncle emigrate to Australia. Martha has been a prostitute and contemplated suicide but towards the end of the novel, she redeems herself by helping Daniel Peggotty find his niece after she returns to London. She goes with Emily to start a new life in Australia. There, she marries and lives happily.

Their emigration to Australia, in the wake of that of Micawber, Daniel Peggotty, and Mr Mell, emphasizes Dickens's belief that social and moral redemption can be achieved in a distant place, where someone may create a new and healthy life. However, despite their families' forgiveness, they remain "tainted" and their expulsion from England is symbolic of their status: it is only at the other end of the world that these "social outcasts" can be reinstated. Morally, Dickens here conforms to the dominant middle-class opinion.

==== The exception of Rosa Dartle ====
John O. Jordan devotes two pages to this woman, also "lost", though never having sinned. The sanctification of the Victorian home, he says, depends on the opposition between two stereotypes, the "angel" and the "whore". Dickens denounced this restrictive dichotomy by portraying women "in between". Such is Rosa Dartle, passionate being, with the inextinguishable resentment of having been betrayed by Steerforth, a wound that is symbolised by the vibrant scar on her lip. Never does she allow herself to be assimilated by the dominant morality, refusing tooth and nail to put on the habit of the ideal woman. Avenger to the end, she wants the death of Little Emily, both the new conquest and victim of the same predator, and has only contempt for the efforts of David to minimize the scope of his words. As virtuous as anyone else, she claims, especially that Emily, she does not recognize any ideal family, each being moulded in the manner of its social class, nor any affiliation as a woman: she is Rosa Dartle, in herself.

David's vision, on the other hand, is marked by class consciousness: for him, Rosa, emaciated and ardent at the same time, as if there were incompatibility (chapter 20), is a being apart, half human, half animal, like the lynx, with its inquisitive forehead, always on the look out (chapter 29), which consumes an inner fire reflected in the gaunt eyes of the dead of which only this flame remains (chapter 20). In reality, says Jordan, it is impossible for David to understand or even imagine any sexual tension, especially that which governs the relationship between Rosa and Steerforth, which, in a way, reassures his own innocence and protects what he calls his "candour" – frankness or angelism? – his story. Also, Rosa Dartle's irreducible and angry marginality represents a mysterious threat to his comfortable and reassuring domestic ideology.

== Dickens's way of writing ==
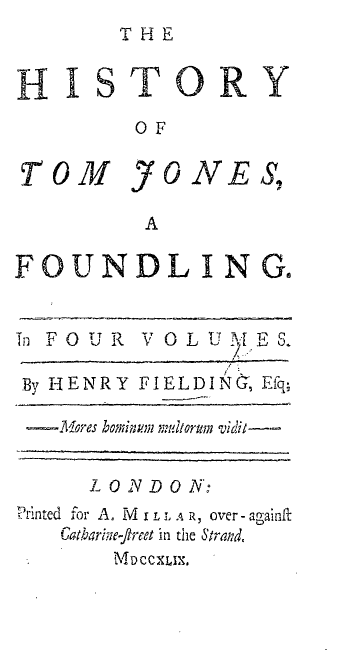
Tom Jones was an important influence on Dickens

Dickens's approach to the novel is influenced by various literary genres, including the picaresque novel tradition, melodrama, and the novel of sensibility. Satire and irony are central to the picaresque novel. Comedy is also an aspect of the British picaresque novel tradition of Laurence Sterne, Henry Fielding, and Tobias Smollett. Fielding's Tom Jones was a major influence on the nineteenth century novel including Dickens, who read it in his youth, and named a son Henry Fielding Dickens in his honour. Melodrama is typically sensational and designed to appeal strongly to the emotions.

Trevor Blount comments on the fascination that Dickens has always exercised on the public. He mentions the lavishness, energy, vividness, brilliance, and tenderness of Dickens's writing, along with the range of his imagination. Blount also refers to Dickens's humour, and his use of the macabre and of pathos. Finally, Blount celebrates the artistic mastery of an overflowing spontaneity, which is conveyed with both delicacy and subtlety. What Blount admires, in the first place, is the vigour with which the characters "rise" from the page and create a "phantasmagorical" universe, which is seen by the reader with the intensity of an hallucination. This is best illustrated in many of Dickens's works, by the powerful figure of a weak individual. In David Copperfield Mr Wilkins Micawber is such a figure, someone who is formidably incompetent, grandiose in his irreducible optimism, sumptuous in his verbal virtuosity, and whose grandiloquent tenderness is irresistibly comical. Micawber has been described as "With the one exception of Falstaff, ... the greatest comic figure in English literature".

In this novel, one characteristic noted by Edgar Johnson is that Dickens, in the first part, "makes the reader see with the eyes of a child", an innovative technique for the time, first tried in Dombey and Son with an omniscient narrator, and carried here to perfection through the use of the 'I'.

Modernist novelist Virginia Woolf writes, that when we read Dickens "we remodel our psychological geography ... [as he produces] characters who exist not in detail, not accurately or exactly, but abundantly in a cluster of wild yet extraordinarily revealing remarks".

=== Satire and pathos ===
The very principle of satire is to question, and to tear off the masks, so as to reveal the raw reality under the varnish. Dickens uses the whole arsenal of literary tools that are available to the satirist, or rather supplied by his narrator, David, who even directs satire upon himself. These tools include irony, humour, and caricature. How it is employed relates to the characters' differing personalities. Satire is thus gentler towards some characters than others; toward David the hero-narrator, it is at once indulgent and transparent.

==== Types of character ====
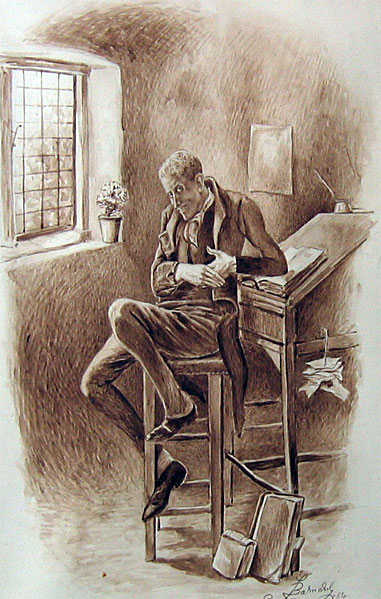
Uriah Heep at his desk, by Fred Barnard

There are several different types of character: On the one hand, there are the good ones, Peggotty, Dr Strong, Traddles, Agnes etc., on the other hand, there are the bad ones, Murdstone, Steerforth, Uriah Heep, etc. A third category are characters who change over time, including Betsey Trotwood, who at first is more obstinate than nasty, it is true, and Martha Endell, and Creakle, etc. There is also a contrast drawn between ever-frozen personalities such as Micawber, Dora, Rosa Dartle, and those who evolve. The latter includes David, Mr Mell, Miss Mowcher. There is also a contrast drawn between the idiosyncrasies of Mr Dick, Barkis, Mrs Gummidge, and the subtle metamorphosis from innocence to maturity of characters like David, Traddles, Agnes.

Dickens worked intensively on developing arresting names for his characters that would reverberate with associations for his readers, and assist the development of motifs in the storyline, giving what one critic calls an "allegorical impetus" to a novel's meanings. The name Mr Murdstone in David Copperfield conjures up twin allusions to "murder" and stony coldness; Strong is definitely not "strong"; Creakle "squeaks and grinds". There can also be a visual dimension to Dickens's humour. This includes Micawber's rotundity, his wife's dried-up body, which forever offers a sterile breast, Betsey's steadfast stiffness, Mr Sharp's bowed head, Daniel Peggotty's stubborn rudeness, Clara Copperfield's delicate silhouette, and Dora's mischievous air. Then there are exaggerated attitudes that are constantly repeated. Dickens creates humour out of character traits, such as Mr Dick's kite flying, James Steerforth's insistent charm, Uriah Heep's obsequiousness, Betsey pounding David's room. There are in addition the employment of repetitive verbal phrases: "umble" of the same Heep, the "willin" of Barkis, the "lone lorn creetur" of Mrs Gummidge. Dickens also uses objects for a humorous purpose, like Traddles's skeletons, the secret box of Barkis, the image of Heep as a snake, and the metallic rigidity of Murdstone.

==== Pathos and indulgent humour ====
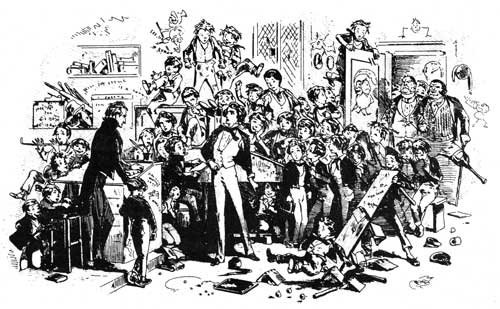
Steerforth and Mr Mell, by Phiz.

In David Copperfield idealised characters and highly sentimental scenes are contrasted with caricatures and ugly social truths. While good characters are also satirised, a considered sentimentality replaces satirical ferocity. This is a characteristic of all of Dickens's writing, but it is reinforced in David Copperfield by the fact that these people are the narrator's close family members and friends, who are devoted to David and sacrificing themselves for his happiness. Hence the indulgence applied from the outset, with humour prevailing along with loving complicity. David is the first to receive such treatment, especially in the section devoted to his early childhood, when he is lost in the depths of loneliness in London, following his punishment by Mr Murdstone. Michael Hollington analyses a scene in chapter 11 that seems emblematic of the situation and how humour and sentimentality are employed by Dickens. This is the episode where the very young David orders a pitcher of the best beer in a public house, "To moisten what I had for dinner". David's memory has retained the image of the scene, which is so vivid that he sees himself as from the outside. He has forgotten the exact date (his birthday). This episode release David's emotional pain, writes Michael Hollington, obliterating the infected part of the wound. Beyond the admiration aroused for the amazing self-confidence of the little child, in resolving this issue and taking control of his life with the assurance of someone much older, the passage "testifies to the work of memory, transfiguring the moment into a true myth". The tone is nostalgic because, ultimately, the epilogue is a true moment of grace. The wife of the keeper, returning David's money, deposits on his forehead a gift that has become extremely rare, a kiss, "Half admired and half compassionate", but above all full of kindness and femininity; at least, adds David, as a tender and precious reminder, "I am sure".

=== Theatricality ===
Dickens went to the theatre regularly from an early age and even considered becoming an actor in 1832. "Many of the plays that he saw on the London stage in the 1820s and 1830s were melodramas". There is a visual, theatrical—even cinematic—element in some scenes in David Copperfield. The cry of Martha at the edge of the river belongs to the purest Victorian melodrama, as does the confrontation between Mr Peggotty and Mrs Steerforth, in chapter 32:

I justify nothing, I make no counter-accusations. But I am sorry to repeat, it is impossible. Such a marriage would irretrievably blight my son's career, and ruin his prospects. Nothing is more certain than that, it never can take place, and never will. If there is any other compensation.

Such language, according to Trevor Blount, is meant to be said aloud. Many other scenes employ the same method: Micawber crossing the threshold, Heep harassing David in Chapter 17, the chilling apparition of Littimer in the middle of David's party in Chapter 27. The climax of this splendid series of scenes is the storm off Yarmouth, which is an epilogue to the menacing references to the sea previously, which shows Dickens's most intense virtuosity (chapter 55).

Dickens made the following comment in 1858: "Every good actor plays direct to every good author, and every writer of fiction, though he may not adopt the dramatic form, writes in effect for the stage".

=== Setting ===
Setting is a major aspect of Dickens's "narrative artistry and of his methods of characterization", so that "the most memorable quality of his novels may well be their atmospheric density [... of the] descriptive writing".

In David Copperfield setting is less urban, more rustic than in other novels, and especially maritime. Besides Peggotty, who is a seaman whose home is an overturned hull, Mr Micawber goes to the naval port of Plymouth on the south coast after prison and appears finally on board a steamer. David himself is connected to Yarmouth, and Aunt Betsey settled in the Channel port of Dover. Young David notices the sea on his first day at her home; "the air from the sea came blowing in again, mixed with the perfume of the flowers". The city, London, is especially the place of misfortune, where the dark warehouse of Murdstone and Grinby are found. The philosopher Alain (pseudonym of Émile-Auguste Chartier) comments as follows about Dickens's portrayal of London (but it might also be applied to other locations), as cited by Lançon:

The Dickensian atmosphere, unlike any other, comes from the way the distinctive nature of a dwelling is linked to the personality of its inhabitant [...] [There is there] a look that creates a sense of reality, with the remarkable connection between buildings and characters.

=== Symbolism ===
Important symbols include, imprisonment, the sea, flowers, animals, dreams, and Mr Dick's kite. According to Henri Suhamy, "Dickens's symbolism consists in giving significance to physical details ... The constant repetition of these details ... contributes to deepen their emblematic significance". This may include the characters, aspects of the story, and, more prominently amongst the motifs, places or objects.

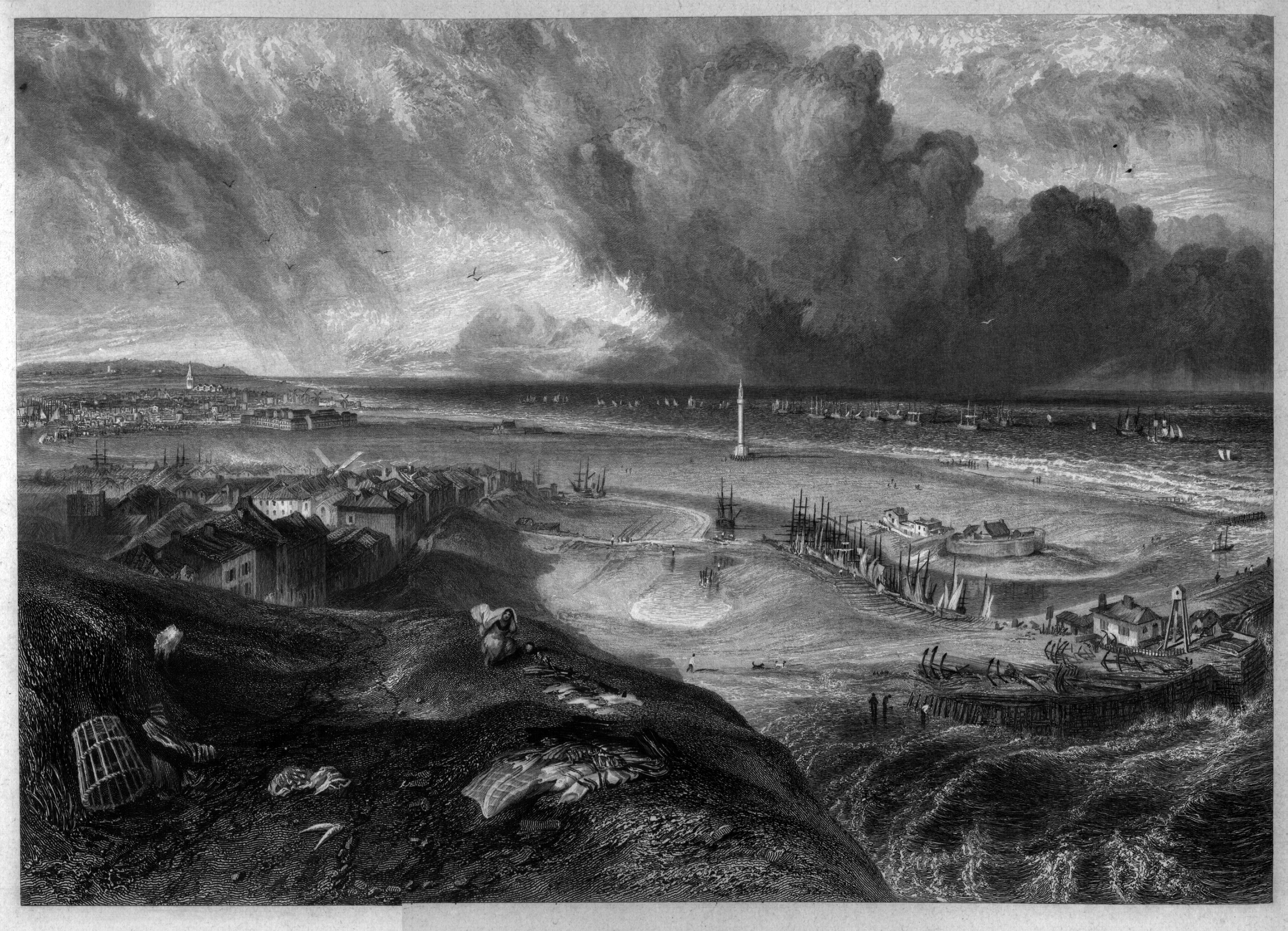
Yarmouth, Norfolk, engraving by William Miller after Turner

Separating realism and symbolism can be tricky, especially, for example, when it relates, to the subject of imprisonment, which is both a very real place of confinement for the Micawber family, and, more generally throughout David Copperfield, symbolic of the damage inflicted on a sick society, trapped in its inability to adapt or compromise, with many individuals walled within themselves.

The imponderable power of the sea is almost always associated with death: it took Emily's father; will take Ham and Steerforth, and in general is tied to David's "unrest" associated with his Yarmouth experiences. In the end nothing remains but Steerforth's body cast-up as "flotsam and jetsam", that symbolises the moral emptiness of David's adoration. The violent storm in Yarmouth coincides with the moment when the conflicts reached a critical threshold, when it is as if angry Nature called for a final resolution; as Kearney noted, "The rest of the novel is something of an anti-climax after the storm chapter." Referring to the climactic storm scene in David Copperfield, the last in any Dickens novel, Kearney remarked that "The symbolism of sea, sky and storm is successfully integrated to achieve what amounts to a mystical dimension in the novel, and this mystical dimension is, on the whole, more acceptable than the ones found elsewhere in Dickens".

According to Daniel L Plung, four types of animal are a particularly important aspect of the way symbolism is used: song birds symbolise innocence; "lions and raptors [are] associated with the fallen but not evil"; dogs, other than Jip, are associated "with the malicious and self-interested"; while snakes and eel represent evil. A typical example of the way that animal symbolism is used is found in the following sentence: " 'the influence of the Murdstones upon me [David] was like the fascination of two snakes on a wretched young bird" '. When David describes Steerforth as "brave as a lion" this is a clue to Steerforth's moral weakness and foreshadows subsequent events.

Flowers symbolise innocence, for example, David is called "Daisy" by Steerforth, because he is naive and pure, while Dora constantly paints bouquets, and when Heep was removed from Wickfield House, flowers return to the living room. Mr Dick's kite, represents how much he is both outside and above society, immune to its hierarchical social system. Furthermore, it flies among the innocent birds, and just as this toy soothes and gives joy to him, Mr Dick heals the wounds and restore peace where the others without exception have failed.

Dreams are also an important part of the novel's underlying symbolic structure, and are "used as a transitional device to bind [its] parts together" with twelve chapters ending "with a dream or reverie". In the early dark period of David's life his dreams "are invariably ugly", but in later chapters they are more mixed, with some reflecting "fanciful hopes" that are never realised, while others are nightmares which foreshadow "actual problems".

In addition physical beauty, in the form of Clara, is emblematic of moral good, while the ugliness of Uriah Heep, Mr Creakle and Mr Murdstone underlines their villainy. While David, the story's hero, has benefited from her love and suffered from the violence of the others.

=== Dialect ===
Dickens, in preparation for this novel, went to Norwich, Lowestoft, and Yarmouth where the Peggotty family resides, but he stayed there for only five hours, on 9 January 1849. He assured his friends, that his descriptions were based on his own memories, brief as were his local experiences. However, looking to the work of K. J. Fielding reveals that the dialect of this town was taken from a book written by a local author, Major Edward Moor published in 1823. There, Dickens found a beein (a house), fisherate (officiate), dodman (snail), clickesen (gossip), and winnicking (tears) from winnick (to cry) and so on.

== Literary significance and reception ==
Many view this novel as Dickens's masterpiece, beginning with his friend and first biographer John Forster, who writes: "Dickens never stood so high in reputation as at the completion of Copperfield", and the author himself calls it "his favourite child". (Note: Conclusion of the preface of 1867: "Like many fond parents, I have in my heart of hearts a favourite child. And his name is David Copperfield.") It is true, he says, that "underneath the fiction lay something of the author's life", that is, an experience of self-writing. It is therefore not surprising that the book is often placed in the category of autobiographical works. From a strictly literary point of view, however, it goes beyond this framework in the richness of its themes and the originality of its writing.

Situated in the middle of Dickens's career, it represents, according to Paul Davis, a turning point in his work, the point of separation between the novels of youth and those of maturity. In 1850, Dickens was 38 years old and had twenty more to live, which he filled with other masterpieces, often denser, sometimes darker, that addressed most of the political, social and personal issues he faced.

=== "The privileged child" of Dickens ===
Dickens welcomed the publication of his work with intense emotion, and he continued to experience this until the end of his life. When he went through a period of personal difficulty and frustration in the 1850s, he returned to David Copperfield as to a dear friend who resembled him: "Why," he wrote to Forster, "Why is it, as with poor David, a sense comes always crashing on me now, when I fall into low spirits, as of one happiness I have missed in life, and one friend and companion I have never made?" (Note: It is likely here that Dickens refers to the failure of his marriage with his wife.) When Dickens begins writing Great Expectations, which was also written in the first person, he reread David Copperfield and confided his feelings to Forster: "was affected by it to a degree you would hardly believe". Criticism has not always been even-handed, though over time the high importance of this novel has been recognised.

=== Initial reception ===
Although Dickens became a Victorian celebrity his readership was mainly the middle classes, including the so-called skilled workers, according to the French critic Fabrice Bensimon, because ordinary people could not afford it. Issues I to V of the serial version reached 25,000 copies in two years, modest sales compared to 32,000 Dombey and Son and 35,000 Bleak House, but Dickens was nevertheless happy: "Everyone is cheering David on", he writes to Mrs Watson, and, according to Forster, his reputation was at the top.

The first reviews were mixed, but the great contemporaries of Dickens showed their approval: Thackeray found the novel "freshly and simply simple"; John Ruskin, in his Modern Painters, was of the opinion that the scene of the storm surpasses Turner's evocations of the sea; more soberly, Matthew Arnold declared it "rich in merits"; and, in his autobiographical book A Small Boy and Others, Henry James evokes the memory of "treasure so hoarded in the dusty chamber of youth".

=== Subsequent reputation ===
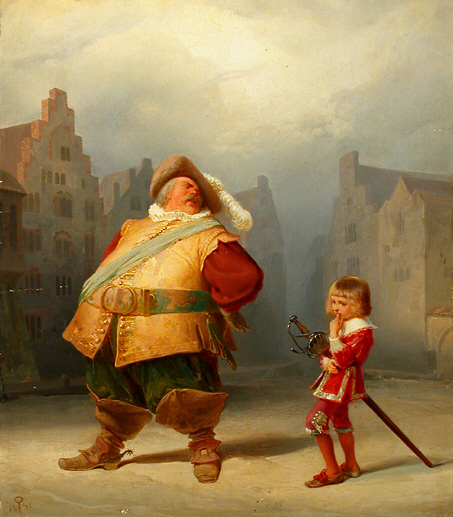
Falstaff (Adolf Schrödter, 1867), to whom J. B. Priestley compares Mr Micawber.

After Dickens's death, David Copperfield rose to the forefront of the writer's works, both through sales, for example, in Household Words in 1872 where sales reached 83,000, and the praise of critics. In 1871, Scottish novelist and poet Margaret Oliphant described it as "the culmination of Dickens's early comic fiction"; However, in the late nineteenth-century Dickens's critical reputation suffered a decline, though he continued to have many readers. This began when Henry James in 1865 "relegated Dickens to the second division of literature on the grounds that he could not 'see beneath the surface of things'". Then in 1872, two years after Dickens's death, George Henry Lewes wondered how to "reconcile [Dickens's] immense popularity with the 'critical contempt' which he attracted". However, Dickens was defended by the novelist George Gissing in 1898 in Charles Dickens: A Critical Study. G. K. Chesterton published an important defence of Dickens in his book Charles Dickens in 1906, where he describes him as this "most English of our great writers". Dickens's literary reputation grew in the 1940s and 1950s because of essays by George Orwell and Edmund Wilson (both published in 1940), and Humphrey House's The Dickens World (1941). However, in 1948, F. R. Leavis in The Great Tradition, contentiously, excluded Dickens from his canon, characterising him as a "popular entertainer" without "mature standards and interests".

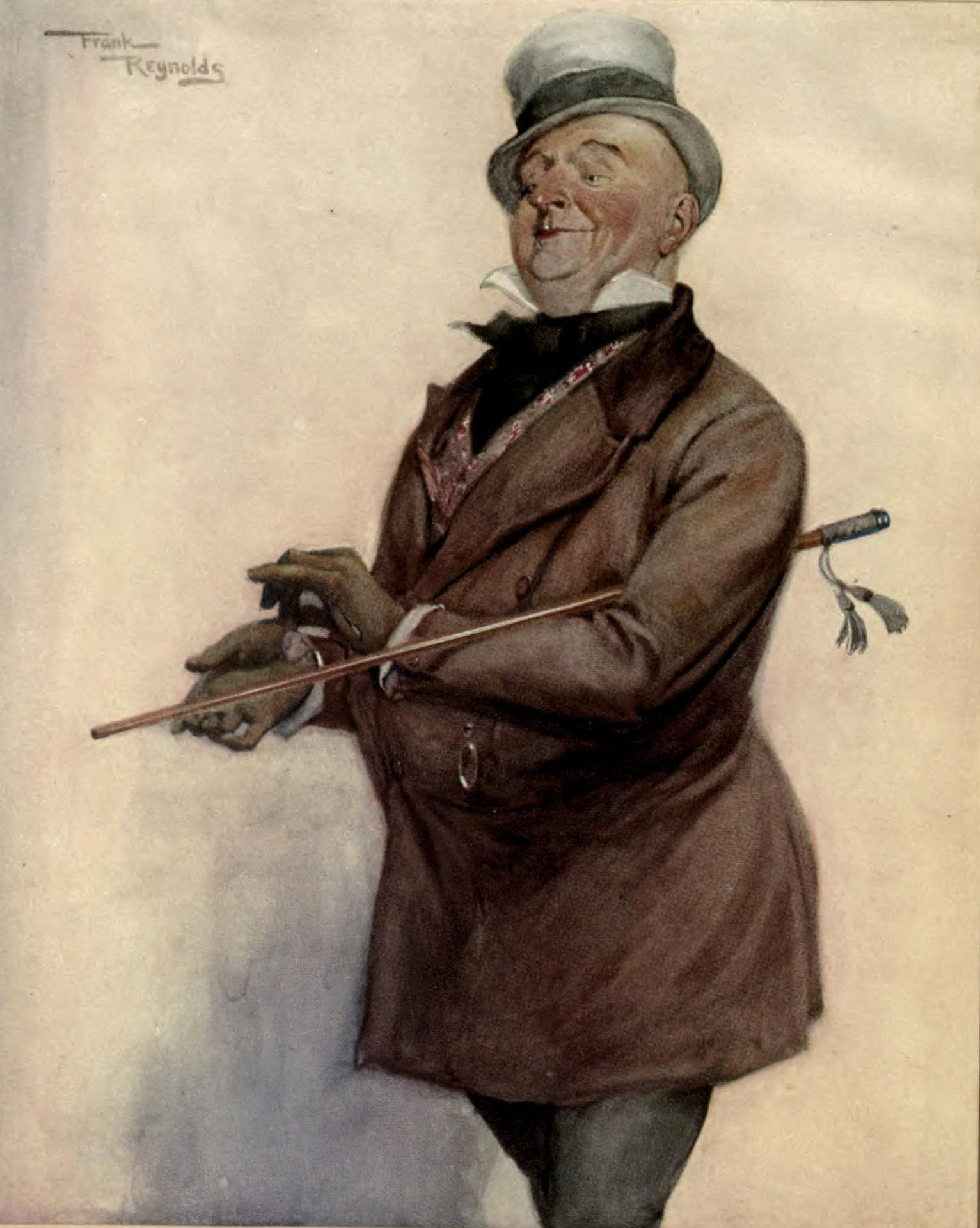
Wilkins Micawber by Frank Reynolds, per Maugham "he never fails you."

Dickens's reputation, however, continued to grow and K. J. Fielding (1965) and Geoffrey Thurley (1976) identify what they call David Copperfield's "centrality", and Q. D. Leavis in 1970, looked at the images he draws of marriage, of women, and of moral simplicity. In their 1970 publication Dickens the Novelist, F. R. and Q. D. Leavis called Dickens "one of the greatest of creative writers", and F. R. Leavis had changed his mind about Dickens since his 1948 work, no longer finding the popularity of the novels with readers as a barrier to their seriousness or profundity. In 1968 Sylvère Monod, after having finely analyzed the structure and style of the novel, describe it as "the triumph of the art of Dickens", which analysis was shared by Paul B. Davis. The central themes are explored by Richard Dunne in 1981, including the autobiographical dimension, the narrator-hero characterization process, memory and forgetting, and finally the privileged status of the novel in the interconnection between similar works of Dickens. Q. D. Leavis compares Copperfield to Tolstoy's War and Peace and looks at adult-child relationships in both novels. According to writer Paul B. Davis, Q. D. Leavis excels at dissecting David's relationship with Dora. Gwendolyn Needham in an essay, published in 1954, analyzes the novel as a bildungsroman, as did Jerome H. Buckley twenty years later. In 1987 Alexander Welsh devoted several chapters to show that Copperfield is the culmination of Dickens's autobiographical attempts to explore himself as a novelist in the middle of his career. Finally, J. B. Priestley was particularly interested in Mr Micawber and concludes that "With the one exception of Falstaff, he is the greatest comic figure in English literature".

In 2015, the BBC Culture section polled book critics outside the UK about novels by British authors; they ranked David Copperfield eighth on the list of the 100 Greatest British Novels. The characters and their varied places in society in the novel evoked reviewer comments, for example, the novel is "populated by some of the most vivid characters ever created," "David himself, Steerforth, Peggotty, Mr Dick – and it climbs up and down and off the class ladder.", remarked by critic Maureen Corrigan and echoed by Wendy Lesser.

=== Opinions of other writers ===
David Copperfield has pleased many writers. Charlotte Brontë, for example, commented in 1849 in a letter to the reader of her publisher: "I have read David Copperfield; it seems to me very good—admirable in some parts. You said it had affinity to Jane Eyre: it has—now and then—only what an advantage has Dickens in his varied knowledge of men and things!" Tolstoy, for his part, considered it "the best work of the best English novelist" and, according to F. R. Leavis and Q. D. Leavis, was inspired by David and Dora's love story to have Prince Andrew marry Princess Lise in War and Peace. Henry James remembered being moved to tears, while listening to the novel, hidden under a table, read aloud in the family circle. Dostoevsky enthusiastically cultivated the novel in a prison camp in Siberia. Franz Kafka wrote in his diary in 1917, that the first chapter of his novel Amerika was inspired by David Copperfield. (Note: Kafka's novel is a kind of inverted bildungsroman, since the young man whose destiny we follow is more of a disaster than an accomplishment.) James Joyce parodied it in Ulysses. Virginia Woolf, who was not very fond of Dickens, states that David Copperfield, along with Robinson Crusoe, Grimm's fairy tales, Scott's Waverley and Pickwick's Posthumous Papers, "are not books, but stories communicated by word of mouth in those tender years when fact and fiction merge, and thus belong to the memories and myths of life, and not to its aesthetic experience." Woolf also noted in a letter to Hugh Walpole in 1936, that she is re-reading it for the sixth time: "I'd forgotten how magnificent it is." It also seems that the novel was Sigmund Freud's favourite; and Somerset Maugham sees it as a "great" work, although his hero seems to him rather weak, unworthy even of its author, while Mr Micawber never disappoints: "The most remarkable of them is, of course, Mr Micawber. He never fails you."

== Illustrations ==
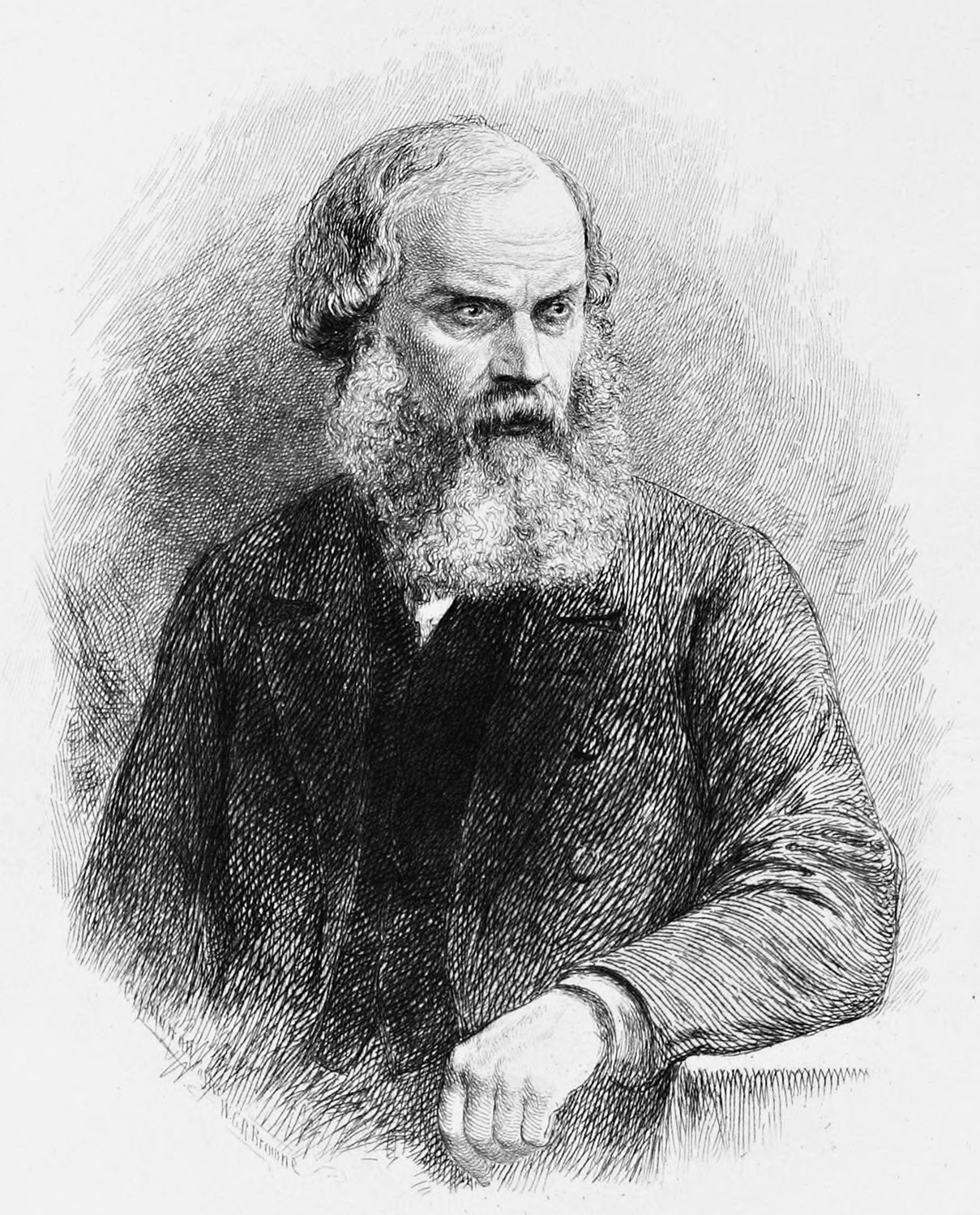
Hablot Knight Browne (Phiz), illustrator

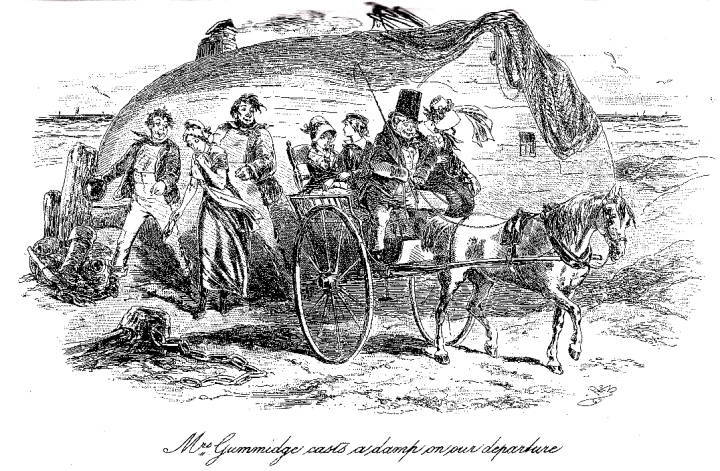
The Peggotty family house depicted by Phiz

As is the custom for a regular serialised publication for a wide audience, David Copperfield, like Dickens's earlier novels, was from the beginning a "story in pictures" whose many engravings are part of the novel and how the story is related.

=== Hablot Knight Browne (Phiz) ===
Phiz drew the original, the first two illustrations associated with David Copperfield: on the wrapper for the serial publication, for which he engraved the silhouette of a baby staring at a globe, probably referring to the working title (The Copperfield Survey of the World as it Rolled), and the frontispiece (later used in the published books), and the title page. The green wrapper is shown at the top of this article. Phiz drew the images around the central baby-over-the-globe with no information on the characters who would appear in the novel. He knew only that it would be a bildungsroman. The images begin at the bottom, on the left side of the tree that has leaves on the left, and is dead on the right. A woman holds a baby on her lap. The images continue clockwise, marking events of a life, but with no reference to any specific event or specific character of the novel.

When each issue was written, Phiz then worked with Dickens on the illustrations. "In the monthly plates, Phiz would have to translate the memories of the protagonist-narrator into a third-person objective or dramatic point of view." Some of his illustrations contain details that are not in the text, but illuminate a character or situation, "forming part of [...] of what the novel is". Dickens accepted and even encouraged these additional, sometimes subtle indications, which, commenting on the event, say more than the narrator says in print. The latter intends to stay behind, just like the author who, thus, hides behind the illustrator.

Dickens was particularly scrupulous about illustrations; he scrutinised the smallest details and sometimes demanded modifications, for example to replace for a very particular episode the coat that David wears by "a little jacket". The illustration of the meeting between David and Aunt Betsey was particularly delicate, and Phiz had to do it several times, the ultimate choice being that of Dickens. Once the desired result was obtained, Dickens does not hide his satisfaction: the illustrations are "capital", he writes to Phiz, and especially that which depicts Mr Micawber in chapter 16, "uncommonly characteristic".

One puzzling mismatch between the text and accompanying illustrations is that of the Peggotty family's boat-house "cottage" on the Yarmouth sands (pictured). It is clear from the text that the author envisaged the house as an upright boat, whereas the illustrator depicted it as an upturned hull resting on the beach with holes cut for the doors and windows. Interior illustrations of the cottage also show it as a room with curved ceiling beams implying an upturned hull. Although Dickens seemed to have had the opportunity to correct this discrepancy he never did, suggesting that he was happy with the illustrator's depiction.

=== Other illustrators ===
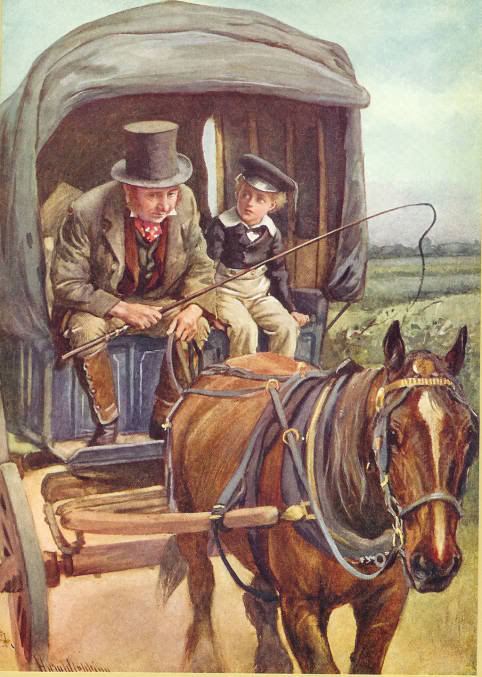
Barkis takes David to Yarmouth (Harold Copping)

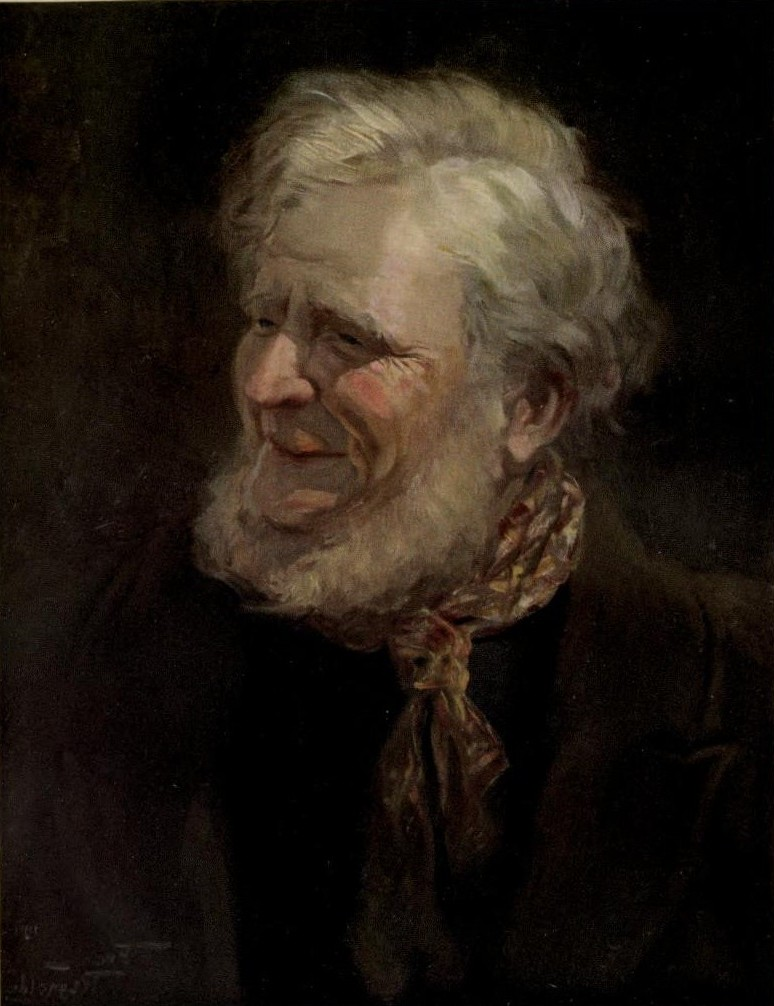
Daniel Peggotty by Frank Reynolds

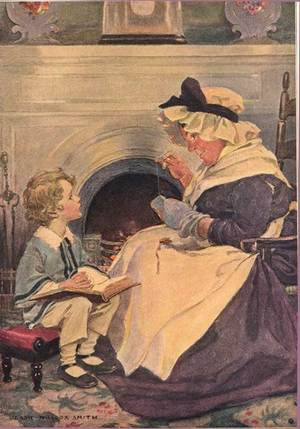
Peggotty and David, by Jessie Willcox-Smith

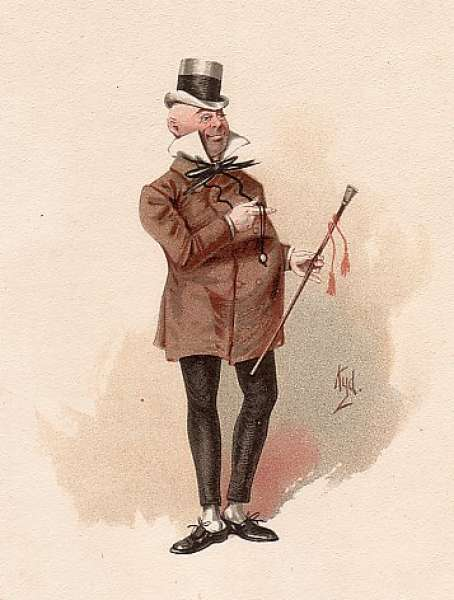
Micawber by "Kyd"

David Copperfield was later illustrated by many artists, after the serialization, including:

- Fred Barnard (1846–1896), who illustrated David Copperfield in the Household Edition by Chapman & Hall in the 1870s;
- Kyd (Joseph Clayton Clarke) (1855–1937);
- Harold Copping (1863–1932), who illustrated Dickens stories for children;
- Frank Reynolds (1876–1953);
- Jessica Willcox Smith (1863–1935) who has illustrated many abbreviated editions for children.
- Charles Keeping (1924–1988) who illustrated the complete works of Dickens for the Folio Society.

Some of these works are fullsize paintings rather than illustrations included in editions of the novels. Kyd painted watercolours. Frank Reynolds provided the illustrations for a 1911 edition of David Copperfield.

Although the reputation of Dickens with literary critics went through a decline and a much later rise after he died, his popularity with readers followed a different pattern after his death. Around 1900, his novels, including David Copperfield, began an increase in popularity, and the 40-year copyrights expired for all but his latest novels, opening the door to other publishers in the UK; by 1910 all of them had expired. This created the opportunity for new illustrators in new editions of the novels, as both Fred Barnard (Household Edition) and Frank Reynolds (1911 edition of David Copperfield) provided, for example; their styles were different from that of Phiz who provided the illustrations for the first publications of the novel in 1850 and during the author's life. As the books were read by so many (one publisher, Chapman & Hall, sold 2 million copies of Dickens's works in the period 1900–1906), the characters became more popular for use outside the novels, in jigsaw puzzles and postcards. Uriah Heep and Mr Micawber were popular figures for illustrations. As World War I approached, the illustrations on postcards and the novels, abridged or full length, continued in popularity in the UK and among the soldiers and sailors abroad.

== Editions of David Copperfield ==
=== First edition ===
- 1850, UK, Bradbury & Evans, publication date 14 November 1850, bound (first edition), 624 pages, 38 plates.

Like Dombey and Son, David Copperfield was not the subject of a specific contract; it followed the agreement of 1 June 1844, which was still valid. In that contract, the publishing house Bradbury and Evans received a quarter of the receipts from what Dickens wrote for the next eight years. This did not prevent the novelist from criticizing his publisher, or providing an incomplete number, just "to see exactly where I am" and for his illustrator Phiz to have "some material to work on".

The first edition was dedicated to the honourable Mr and Mrs Richard Watson, from Rockingham, Northamptonshire, aristocratic friends met on a trip to Switzerland five years earlier. Dickens wrote a brief preface in 1850 and entrusted it Forster after he finished the manuscript. It includes the promise that a new work would follow. This preface was also used for the Cheap Edition of 1859. The ultimate version of 1867, also called the Charles Dickens Edition, included another preface by Dickens saying that David Copperfield was his favourite work.

=== Selected later editions ===
Three volumes were published by Tauchnitz in 1849–50, in English, for distribution outside Great Britain in Europe. During Dickens's lifetime, many other editions were released, and many since he died. According to Paul Schlicke, the most reliable edition is the 1981 edition from Clarendon Press with an introduction and notes by Nina Burgis; it serves as a reference for later editions, including those of Collins, Penguin Books and Wordsworth Classics.

- 1858, UK, Chapman & Hall and Bradbury & Evans, publication date 1858, hardback, 'Library Edition', 515 pages.
- 1867, UK, Wordsworth Classics, Preface by the author (the "Charles Dickens edition", with his statement "But, like many fond parents, I have in my heart of hearts a favourite child. And his name is DAVID COPPERFIELD.")
- 1962 (reprinted 2006 with an afterword by Gish Jen) US, Signet Classics ISBN 0-451-53004-7. Includes passages deleted for the original monthly serial, and unrestored in subsequent editions.
- 1981 (reprinted 2003) UK, Oxford University Press ISBN 0-19-812492-9, hardback, edited by Nina Burgis, The Clarendon Dickens, 781 pages.
- 1990, USA, W W Norton & Co Ltd ISBN 0-393-95828-0, publication date 31 January 1990, hardback (Jerome H. Buckley (Editor), Norton Critical Edition – contains annotations, introduction, critical essays, bibliography and other material).

== Adaptations ==
=== Earliest adaptations ===
While it was being published, David Copperfield was the object, according to Philip Bolton's survey, of six initial dramatisations, followed by a further twenty when the public's interest was at its peak in the 1850s. The first adaptation, Born with a Caul by George Almar, was staged while the serial issues were not yet completed, with some changes from Dickens's plot, having Steerforth live and marry Emily, and inventing a character to kill Mr Murdstone. The most spectacular dramatisation, however, were those of Dickens himself. Although he waited more than ten years to prepare a version for his public readings, it soon became one of his favourite performances, especially the storm scene, which he kept for the finale, "the most sublime moment in all the readings".

=== Fiction ===
- Barbara Kingsolver's 2022 novel, Demon Copperhead, closely parallels the events, characters, and moral trajectory of Dickens' novel but is set in late-twentieth-century/early-twenty-first-century Appalachia.

=== Radio ===
- Favourite Story, hosted by Ronald Colman – 25 October 1947
- Theater Guild on the Air – 24 December 1950 with Richard Burton, Boris Karloff, Flora Robson and Cyril Ritchard
- The Personal History of David Copperfield – BBC Radio 4, 1991 – a ten-part series adapted by Betty Davies with Gary Cady as David Copperfield, Miriam Margolyes, John Moffatt, Timothy Spall and Sheila Hancock
- Performed unabridged on Audible by Richard Armitage 2018

=== Film and TV ===
David Copperfield has been filmed on several occasions:

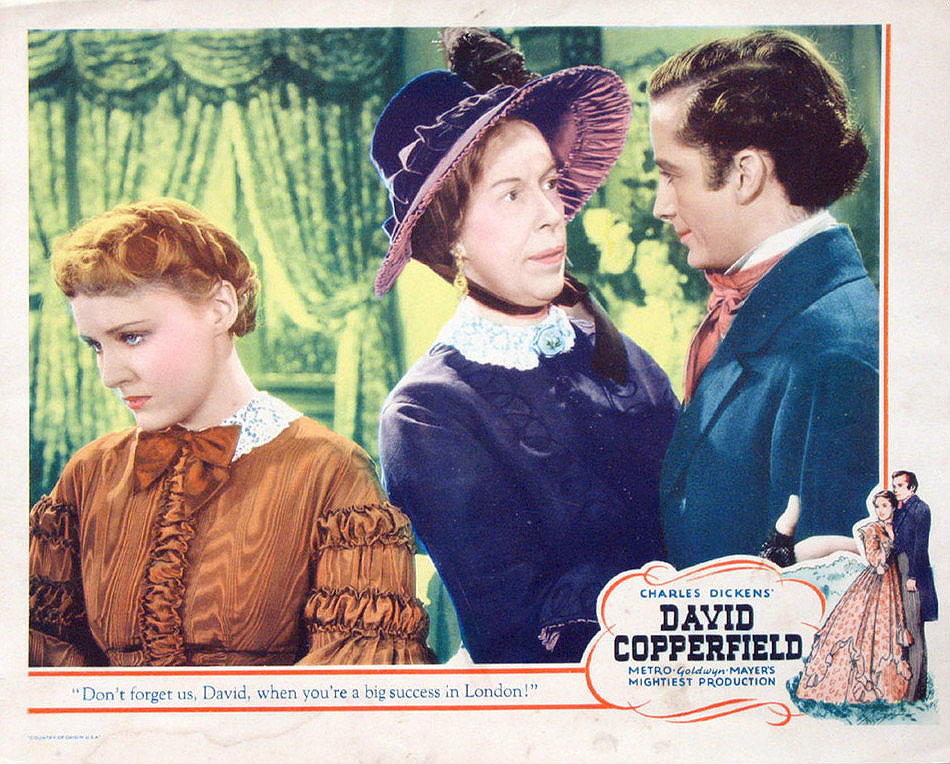
David Copperfield (1935)

- 1911: David Copperfield, silent film directed by Theodore Marston
- 1913: David Copperfield, silent film directed by Thomas Bentley
- 1922: David Copperfield, silent film directed by A. W. Sandberg
- 1935: David Copperfield, a film directed by George Cukor, featuring W. C. Fields
- 1956: David Copperfield, a 13-part TV serial shown on BBC. No recordings are known to exist.
- 1966: David Copperfield, a 13-part TV serial. Only four of the thirteen episodes are known to exist.
- 1969: David Copperfield, a TV film directed by Delbert Mann
- 1974: David Copperfield, a 6-part TV serial directed by Joan Craft
- 1983: David Copperfield, an animated film by Burbank Films Australia
- 1986: David Copperfield, a 10-part TV serial directed by Barry Letts, shown on BBC
- 1993: David Copperfield, animated TV film, shown on NBC
- 1999: David Copperfield, a 2-part TV serial shown on BBC
- 2000: David Copperfield, a TV film directed by Peter Medak
- 2019: The Personal History of David Copperfield, a film directed by Armando Iannucci

== See also ==
- Letters of Charles Dickens

== Bibliography ==
Books

- Ackroyd, Peter (1990). Dickens. London: Sinclar-Stevenson. ISBN 978-1-85619-000-8.
- Bakhtin, Mikhail (1996), "The Bildungsroman and its Significance in the History of Realism", in Emerson, Caryl; Holquist, Michael (eds.), Speech Genres and Other Late Essays, Slavic Series, Austin, Texas: University of Texas Press, p. 21, ISBN 978-0292775602
- Bloom, Harold, ed. (1993) [1987]. Charles Dickens's David Copperfield. Major Literary Characters. New York: Chelsea House Publishers. ISBN 978-0877547365.
- Bradbury, Nicola (2008). "Dickens's Use of the Autobiographical Fragment". In Paroissien, David (ed.). A Companion to Charles Dickens. Oxford: Blackwell. ISBN 978-1-4051-3097-4.
- Burgis, Nina (1981). Preface. David Copperfield. By Dickens, Charles. Oxford: Clarendon Press. ISBN 0-19-812492-9.
- Carlyle, Thomas (1998) [1841]. Les Héros [On Heroes and Hero Worship and the Heroic in History]. Les trésors retrouvés de la Revue des deux mondes (in French). Translated by Rosso, François. Paris: Maisonneuve & Larose. ISBN 2-70681-321 0. "Preface by Bruno de Cessole"
- Collins, Philip, ed. (1996). Charles Dickens: The Critical Heritage (3rd ed.). Routledge. ISBN 978-0415134590.
- Collins, Philip (2016). Dickens and Crime (3rd ed.). Springer. ISBN 978-1349235452.
- Cordery, Gareth (2008). "David Copperfield". In Paroissien, David (ed.). A Companion to Charles Dickens. Oxford: Blackwell. ISBN 978-1-4051-3097-4.
- Davis, Paul B (1999). Charles Dickens from A to Z. New York: Checkmark Books. ISBN 978-0-8160-4087-2.
- Dickens, Charles (1985). David Copperfield. London: Penguin Books. ISBN 978-0-14-043008-0. "Introduction and notes by Trevor Blount"
- Dickens, Charles (1999). David Copperfield. Reference edition. London: Wordsworth Classics. ISBN 978-1-85326-024-7. "Introduction and notes by Adrienne E Gavin"
- Dickens, Henry Fielding (1934). The Recollections of Sir Henry Fielding Dickens, KC. William Heinemann Ltd.
- Dunn, Richard J, ed. (1984). Approaches to Teaching Dickens' David Copperfield. New York: The Modern Language Association of America. ISBN 978-0873524834.
- Ferrieux, Robert (2001). La Littérature Autobiographique en Grande-Bretagne et en Irlande [Autobiography Literature in Great Britain and Ireland] (in French and English). Paris: Ellipses. ISBN 978-2-7298-0021-5.
- Forster, John (1976). Life of Charles Dickens. London: Everyman's Library. ISBN 978-0460007825.
- Forster, John (1966) [1872–1874]. The Life of Charles Dickens. London: J M Dent & Sons.
- Gusdorf, Georges (1956). "Conditions and Limits of Autobiography". In Reichenkron, Günter; Haase, Erich (eds.). in Formen der Selbstarung, Analektren zu einer Geschiste literarischen Selbsportraits Festgabe für Fritz Neubert [In forms of self-expression, analogues to a history of the literary self-portrait: Festgabe for Fritz Neubert]. Berlin: Presses Universitaires de France.
- Hollington, Michael (1997). Boucher-Rivalain, Odile (ed.). Roman et Poésie en Angleterre au xixe siècle [The Novel and Poetry in 19th century England]. Paris: Ellipses. ISBN 978-2-7298-4710-4.
- Johnson, Edgar (1977) [1952]. Charles Dickens: His Tragedy and Triumph. New York: Viking. OCLC 561737618 – via Charles Dickens Page.
- Johnson, E D H (1969). Charles Dickens: An Introduction to His Novels. Random House.
- Jeffers, Thomas L (2005). Apprenticeships: The Bildungsroman from Goethe to Santayana. New York: Palgrave. p. 2. ISBN 1-4039-6607-9.
- Jordan, John O, ed. (2001). The Cambridge companion to Charles Dickens. New York: Cambridge University Press. ISBN 978-0521669641.
- Leavis, F R (1948). The Great Tradition. Chatto & Windus.
- Lynch, Jack (1999). "Glossary of Literary and Rhetorical Terms, Bildungsroman". Rutgers University. Archived from the original on 5 August 2011.
- McKnight, Natalie (2008). "Dickens and Gender". In Paroissien, David (ed.). A Companion to Charles Dickens. Oxford: Blackwell. ISBN 978-1-4051-3097-4.
- Mee, Jon (2010). The Cambridge Introduction to Charles Dickens. Cambridge Introductions to Literature. Cambridge University Press. ISBN 978-0-521-67634-2.
- Paroissien, David, ed. (2011). A Companion to Charles Dickens. Chichester: Wiley Blackwell. ISBN 978-0-470-65794-2.
- Patten, Robert L (1978). Charles Dickens and His Publishers. Oxford: Oxford University Press. ISBN 978-0198120766.
- Priestley, J B (1966) [1925]. The English Comic Characters. New York: E P Dutton.
- Purton, Valerie (2012). Dickens and the Sentimental Tradition: Fielding, Richardson, Sterne, Goldsmith, Sheridan, Lamb. Anthem nineteenth century studies. Anthem Press. ISBN 978-0857284181.
- Pykett, Lyn (2008). "Dickens and Criticism". In Paroissien, David (ed.). A Companion to Charles Dickens. John Wiley & Sons. ISBN 978-0-470-69190-8.
- Sanders, Andrew (1997). Introduction. David Copperfield. By Dickens, Charles. Oxford World Classics. London: Oxford University Press. ISBN 978-0192835789. "Editor is Nina Burgis, with an introduction and notes by Andrew Sanders"
- Schlicke, Paul (1999). Oxford Reader's Companion to Dickens. New York: Oxford University Press. ISBN 978-0198662136.
- Stone, Harry (1968). Charles Dickens's Uncollected Writings from Household Words 1850-1859. Vol. 1 and 2. Indiana: Indiana University Press. ISBN 978-0713901207.
- Stone, Harry (1987). Dickens's working notes for his novels. Chicago: University of Chicago Press. ISBN 978-0-226-14590-7.
- Storey, Graham (1991). David Copperfield – Interweaving Truth and Fiction. Twayne's Masterwork Studies. Boston: Twayne Publishers. ISBN 978-0805781427.
- Suhamy, Henri (1971). Great Expectations. Cours d'Agrégation. Vanves, France: CNED.
- Tomalin, Claire (2011). Charles Dickens: A Life. Viking. ISBN 978-0-670-91767-9.
- Watt, Ian (1963) [1957]. The Rise of the Novel. London: Penguin Books.
- Westburg, Barry (1977). The Confessional Fictions of Charles Dickens. DeKalb, Illinois: Northern Illinois University Press. pp. 33–114. ISBN 978-0875800653.
- Wilson, Angus (1972). The World of Charles Dickens. Harmondsworth: Penguin Books. ISBN 978-0140034882..
- Woolf, Virginia (1986). McNeillie, Andrew (ed.). The Essays of Virginia Woolf: 1925-1928. London: Hogarth Press. ISBN 978-0-7012-0669-7.
- Worth, George J (1978). Dickensian Melodrama: A Reading of the Novels. Lawrence, Kansas: University of Kansas.

Journals

- Bottum, Joseph (1995). "The Gentleman's True Name: David Copperfield and the Philosophy of Naming". Nineteenth-Century Literature. 49 (4): 435–455. doi:10.2307/2933728. ISSN 0891-9356. JSTOR 2933728.
- Cordery, Gareth (Spring 1998). "Foucault, Dickens, and David Copperfield". Victorian Literature and Culture. 26 (1): 71–85. doi:10.1017/S106015030000228X. ISSN 1060-1503. S2CID 162740342.
- Hager, Kelly (1996). "Estranging David Copperfield: Reading the Novel of Divorce". ELH. 63 (4): 989–1019. doi:10.1353/elh.1996.0032. ISSN 1080-6547. S2CID 161104289.
- Kearney, Anthony (January 1978). "The Storm Scene in David Copperfield". Ariel, A Review of International English Literature. 9 (1). Johns Hopkins University Press.
- Kincaid, James R. (Summer 1969). "Symbol and subversion in David Copperfield". Studies in the Novel. 1 (2).
- Levin, Harry (Autumn 1970). "Charles Dickens (1812–1870)". The American Scholar. 39 (4).
- Meckler, Jerome (1975). "Some Household Words". The Dickensian (71). London.
- Plung, Daniel L (1 December 2000). "Environed by wild beasts: Animal imagery in Dickens's David Copperfield". Dickens Quarterly. 17 (4).
- Saville, Julia F (2002). "Eccentricity as Englishness in David Copperfield". SEL: Studies in English Literature 1500–1900. 42 (4): 781–797. doi:10.1353/sel.2002.0041. ISSN 1522-9270. S2CID 143602239.
- Takei, Akiko (Summer 2005). "Benevolence or Manipulation? The Treatment of Mr Dick". The Dickensian. 101 (466). London.

Letters written by Charles Dickens

Letters, cited by recipient and date in the References, are found in the Pilgrim edition, published in 12 volumes, from 1965 to 2003.

- House, Madeline; Storey, Graham; Tillotson, Kathleen; Burgis, Nina (eds.). The Letters of Charles Dickens (The Pilgrim ed.). Oxford University Press.
