= Rathbone =

Rathbone is a surname which may refer to:

== People ==
- Monroe Jackson Rathbone II (1900–1976), American businessman
- Andy Rathbone (born 1961), American writer.
- Augusta Rathbone (1897–1990), American artist
- Basil Rathbone (1892–1967), British actor
- Clyde Rathbone (born 1981), Australian rugby union player
- Eleanor Florence Rathbone (1872–1946), British M.P. and campaigner for women's rights
- Elfrida Rathbone (1871–1940), English educationist and philanthropist, cousin of Eleanor Rathbone
- Eliza Rathbone (born 1948), American art historian and museum curator
- Hannah Mary Rathbone (1798–1878), English writer
- Harold Steward Rathbone, co-founder of Della Robbia Pottery
- Henry Rathbone (1837–1911), US Army major and diplomat present at Abraham Lincoln's assassination
- Henry Riggs Rathbone (1870–1928), US Congressman and son of Henry Rathbone
- Hugh Reynolds Rathbone (1862–1940), Liverpool merchant
- Jack Rathbone (born 1999), American ice hockey player
- Jackson Rathbone (born 1984), American actor
- John Rathbone (1910–40), English politician
- John Rathbone (1750–1807), English painter
- Julian Rathbone (1935–2008), English novelist
- Justus H. Rathbone (1839–1889), founder of the Knights of Pythias
- Oliver Rathbone (born 1996), English footballer
- Richard Rathbone (1788–1860), Liverpool merchant
- Tim Rathbone (1933–2002), English politician
- William Rathbone II (1696–1746), founder of Rathbone Brothers, initially a Liverpool-based timber trading business
- William Rathbone III (1726–89), Liverpool merchant
- William Rathbone IV (1757–1809), Liverpool merchant
- William Rathbone V (1787–1868), Liverpool merchant
- William Rathbone VI (1819–1902), English politician

== Fictional characters ==
- Oliver Rathbone, a lawyer in Anne Perry mystery novels about William Monk (character)
- Henry Rathbone, father of Oliver Rathbone in Anne Perry mystery novels

== See also ==
- William R. Rathvon (1854–1939), sometimes referred to as William V. Rathbone, only eyewitness to Lincoln's Gettysburg Address to leave an audio recording of the experience, Christian Science convert, public lecturer, board member, treasurer and author
