= William Rathbone =

William Rathbone may refer to:

- William R. Rathvon (1854–1939), sometimes incorrectly referred to as William V Rathvon or William V Rathbone, eye-witness to Abraham Lincoln's Gettysburg Address
- Several members Rathbone family of Liverpool, England:
  - William Rathbone II (1696–1746), sawyer
  - William Rathbone III (1726–1789), merchant and ship-owner
  - William Rathbone IV (1757–1809), merchant and ship-owner
  - William Rathbone V (1787–1868)
  - William Rathbone VI (1819–1902), British Liberal Party, Member of Parliament 1880–1895
  - William Rathbone X OBE (1936-2022), member of the Council of the Queen's Nursing Institute, chief executive of the charity RUKBA, and trustee or advisor of nine other charities.

== See also ==
- William Rathbone (ship) – one of at least two ships
