= Paul Wright (diplomat) =

British diplomat

Sir Paul Hervé Giraud Wright KCMG, OBE (12 May 1915 – 10 June 2005) was a British diplomat who served as ambassador to the Democratic Republic of Congo and to Lebanon.

His wife Beatrice ("Babs"), whom he married in 1942, had succeeded her late husband John Rathbone as Member of Parliament for Bodmin, but did not contest the 1945 general election. They had one child together; she had two children by her previous marriage, including Tim, who later become a Conservative MP.

However, Wright did contest the 1945 general election as Liberal candidate for Bethnal Green North East finishing second.

After retiring from the diplomatic service in 1975, Wright was appointed as honorary secretary general of the celebration committee for the Queen’s Silver Jubilee in 1977, and arranged the music for the occasion. He was a governor of Westminster School and Westminster Cathedral Choir School, and chairman of the Anglo-Lebanese Society.

His wife Beatrice died in 2003, two years before him. They had both converted to Roman Catholicism.

== Publications ==
- Autobiography: A Brittle Glory (1986)
