= Rathbone family =

English family of merchants

In England, the Rathbone family of Liverpool were nonconformist merchants and ship-owners who were known to engage in philanthropy and public service. The family origins trace back to Gawsworth, Cheshire, where the first William Rathbone was born in 1669; it was his son, William Rathbone II, who left Gawsworth for the growing port of Liverpool, where he worked as a sawyer and most likely established a timber business. Having arrived in Liverpool prior to 1730, the family subsequently became involved in the building and ownership of ships, as well as general commerce. In 1788, William Rathbone IV took a lease on the house and estate of Greenbank, then part of the Toxteth Park estate, to serve as a country retreat for his young family, and purchased the freehold of house in 1809, the year of his death.

== Notable members ==
- William Rathbone II (1696–1746)
- William Rathbone III (1726–1789)
- William Rathbone IV (1757–1809)
- William Rathbone V (1787–1868)
- Richard Rathbone (1788–1860)
- Hannah Mary Rathbone (1798–1878)
- William Rathbone VI (1819–1902)
- Henry Rathbone (1837–1911), United States military Brevet Colonel who was present at the assassination of Abraham Lincoln
- Hugh Reynolds Rathbone (1862–1940)
- Elfrida Rathbone (1871–1940)
- Eleanor Rathbone (1872–1946)
- Basil Rathbone (1892–1967), actor famous for portraying Sherlock Holmes
- Irene Rathbone (1892–1980), English novelist
- John Rathbone (1910–1940), Conservative MP, fighter pilot with the RAF
- Tim Rathbone (1933–2002), Conservative MP
- Julian Rathbone (1935–2008), English novelist
- Jenny Rathbone (b. 1950), member of the Senedd for Cardiff Central
- Jackson Rathbone (b. 1984), American actor who traces his ancestry back to the Rathbone family
