= 1941 Bodmin by-election =

UK Parliamentary by-election

The 1941 Bodmin by-election was held on 11 March 1941. The by-election was held due to the death of the incumbent Conservative MP, John Rathbone. It was won by his widow, the unopposed Conservative candidate Beatrice Rathbone.
