= Jenny Rathbone =

Welsh politician (born 1950)

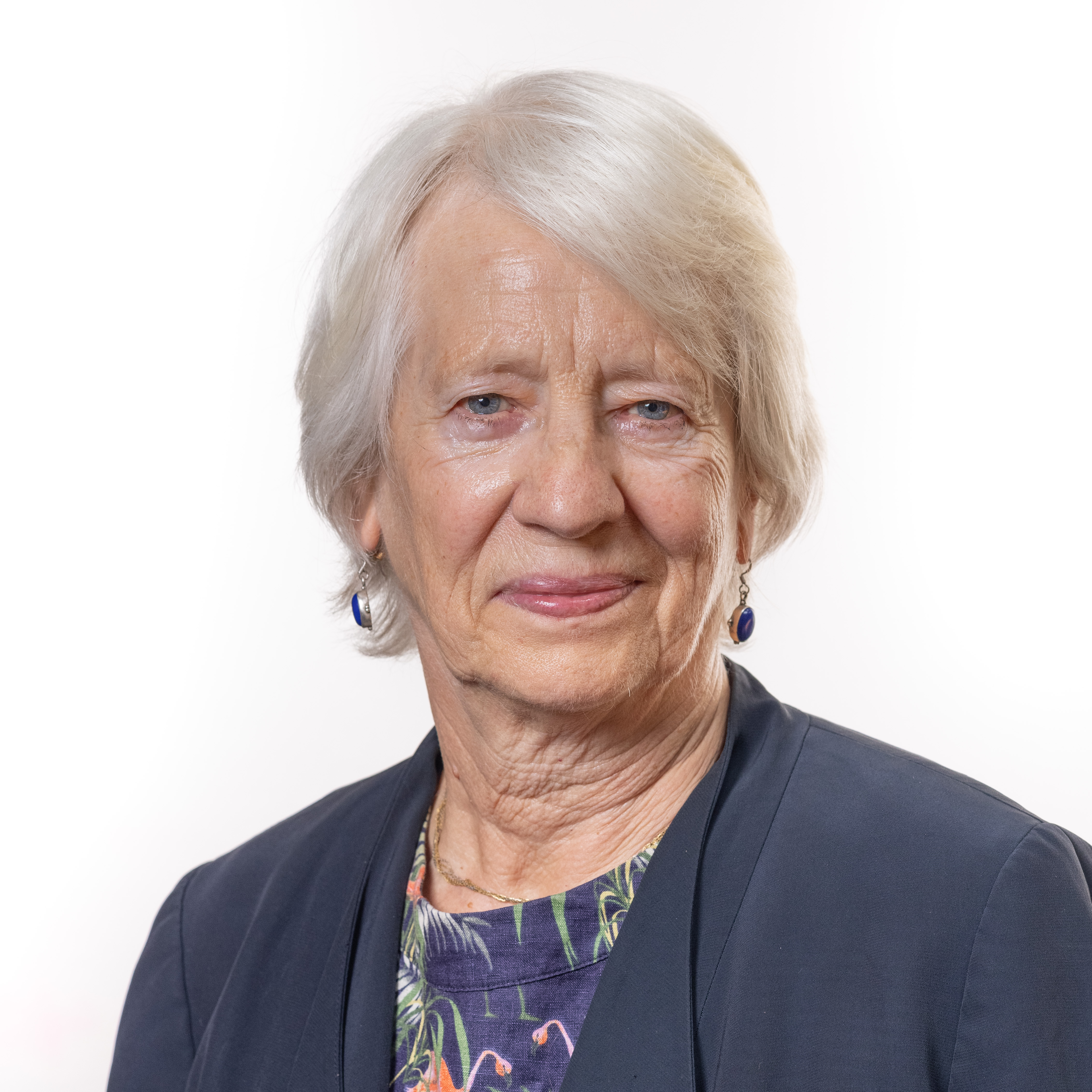
- Rathbone in 2021

Member of the Senedd for Cardiff Central
- In office 6 May 2011 – 7 April 2026
- Preceded by: Jenny Randerson

Islington Borough Councillor for Highbury Ward
- In office 7 May 1998 – 2 May 2002

Personal details
- Born: 12 February 1950 (age 76) Liverpool, England
- Party: Welsh Labour
- Children: 2

Jenny Ann Rathbone (born 12 February 1950) is a Welsh Labour politician who was a Member of the Senedd (MS) from 2011 until 2026, when she did not seek re-election.

== Career ==
She was Labour candidate for Cardiff Central at the 2010 general election, coming second to Liberal Democrat Jenny Willott. She was previously a Labour councillor in the London Borough of Islington from 1998 to 2002.

Rathbone represented the constituency of Cardiff Central between 2011 and 2026. She won the seat from the Liberal Democrats by 38 votes, and retained the seat at elections in 2016 by a margin of 817 votes and 2021 by a margin of 7,640 votes.

She voted for Jeremy Corbyn in Labour's 2015 leadership election. In October 2015 Jenny Rathbone criticised the Welsh Labour government for spending millions on the M4 Relief Road. First Minister Carwyn Jones then removed Rathbone as chairperson of the All Wales European Programme Monitoring Committee. In doing so Mr Jones said: "The chair of the programme monitoring committee is an appointment made by the First Minister, because that person, as is made clear in a letter of appointment, is a representative of the (Labour) Welsh Government." He said it is made clear that the "person is required to have particular regards to act in the spirit of collective responsibility, the main principles of the ministerial code."

Rathbone chaired the Senedd's Equality and Social Justice Committee between 2021 and 2026, and was a member of the Committee for the Scrutiny of the First Minister and the Economy, Trade and Rural Affairs Committee. She was a member of cross-party groups on Active travel, Clean Air, Diabetes, Digital in Wales, Gambling-related harm, Nursing and Midwifery, School food and Women's health.

== Controversy ==
In November 2018, The Jewish Chronicle reported statements made by Rathbone 'in or around November 2017,' in response to a question surrounding increased need for security at a Synagogue in Cyncoed, Cardiff. She responded to the question by attributing the need for increased security to "the failure to come to a peace settlement around Palestine and Israel" and stated that "the fact that the Jewish synagogue in Cyncoed is, is become one of these, you know, fortress is really uncomfortable." She went on to suggest that the Jewish community's need for security at synagogues stemmed from a "siege mentality". First Minister at the time Carwyn Jones described the comments as 'totally unacceptable'. Both candidates in the then-ongoing 2018 Welsh Labour leadership election, Mark Drakeford and Vaughan Gething also condemned her comments. Rathbone was issued with a formal warning, suspended from the Labour group in the Assembly for 6 weeks, and was ordered to undergo antisemitism training in February 2019.

== Personal life ==
Jenny Rathbone was born in Liverpool. She speaks fluent French and Spanish. She has two children and lives in Roath, Cardiff.

=== Family ===
Rathbone descended from the Rathbone family, with many members being notable merchants and politicians. Rathbone's great aunt is Eleanor Rathbone, one of the first women elected as a Member of Parliament. Her great-grandfather was William Rathbone V, who was Lord Mayor of Liverpool.

Rathbone has said to have been "inspired" by her great aunt's work. In 1998, she gave a speech entitled "The continuing relevance of Eleanor Rathbone – 90 years on" at the 10th anniversary of Liverpool Federation of University Women. Rathbone is a trustee of the Eleanor Rathbone Charitable Trust.

== Offices held ==
Senedd
Preceded by Jenny Randerson	Member of the Senedd for Cardiff Central; 2011–2026	Succeeded by seat abolished
