= John Paget (barrister) =

English barrister, police magistrate and author

John Paget (14 May 1811 – 28 May 1898) was an English barrister, police magistrate and author.

== Life ==
Paget was born on 14 May 1811 in Humberstone, Leicestershire, the second son of Thomas Paget, a banker in Leicester. He was educated at home, and after some years as assistant in his father's bank, entered the Middle Temple on 16 October 1835, and was called to the bar on 2 November 1838.

As a young man Paget was a Whig, an activist for the Great Reform Bill, and a member of the Reform Club from its foundation in 1836. He was a member of the library committee there for 24 years, being chairman of it from 1861 to 1865. From 1850 till 1855, he was secretary first to Lord Chancellor Truro, and then to Lord Chancellor Cranworth.

In 1864, Paget was appointed a magistrate at the Thames police court; he was transferred from it to the Hammersmith and Wandsworth courts On their separation he presided over the court in West London till his resignation in 1889.

Paget died on 28 May 1898 at 28 The Boltons, West Brompton, London, leaving a widow and two daughters.

== Works ==
In 1842 Paget published the Income Tax Act, with an introduction, and in 1854 a Report of Dr. Radcliffe's Judgment in the Consistorial Court of Dublin with "observations on the practice of the ecclesiastical courts". He was a contributor to Blackwood's Magazine between 1860 and 1888. His papers adversely criticizing Thomas Babington Macaulay's views of Marlborough, the massacre of Glencoe, the highlands of Scotland, Claverhouse, and William Penn were reprinted in 1861 with the title of The New Examen. Other articles, entitled "Vindication", and dealing with Nelson, Lady Hamilton, the Wigtown martyrs, and Lord Byron; "Judicial Puzzles", dealing with Elizabeth Canning, the Campden Wonder, the Annesley case, Eliza Fenning, and Spencer Cowper's case; and "Essays on Art", dealing with the elements of drawing, Rubens and Ruskin, George Cruikshank and John Leech, were included in a volume and called Paradoxes and Puzzles: Historical, Judicial, and Literary, which appeared in 1874.

Paget also provided illustrations to Bits and Bearing-reins (1875), by Edward Fordham Flower.

== Family ==
On 1 March 1839, Paget married Elizabeth, daughter of William Rathbone V of Greenbank House, Liverpool. His estate was valued at £97,632 13s. 6d.
