= Norman Baker =

British politician

The Right Honourable Norman Baker
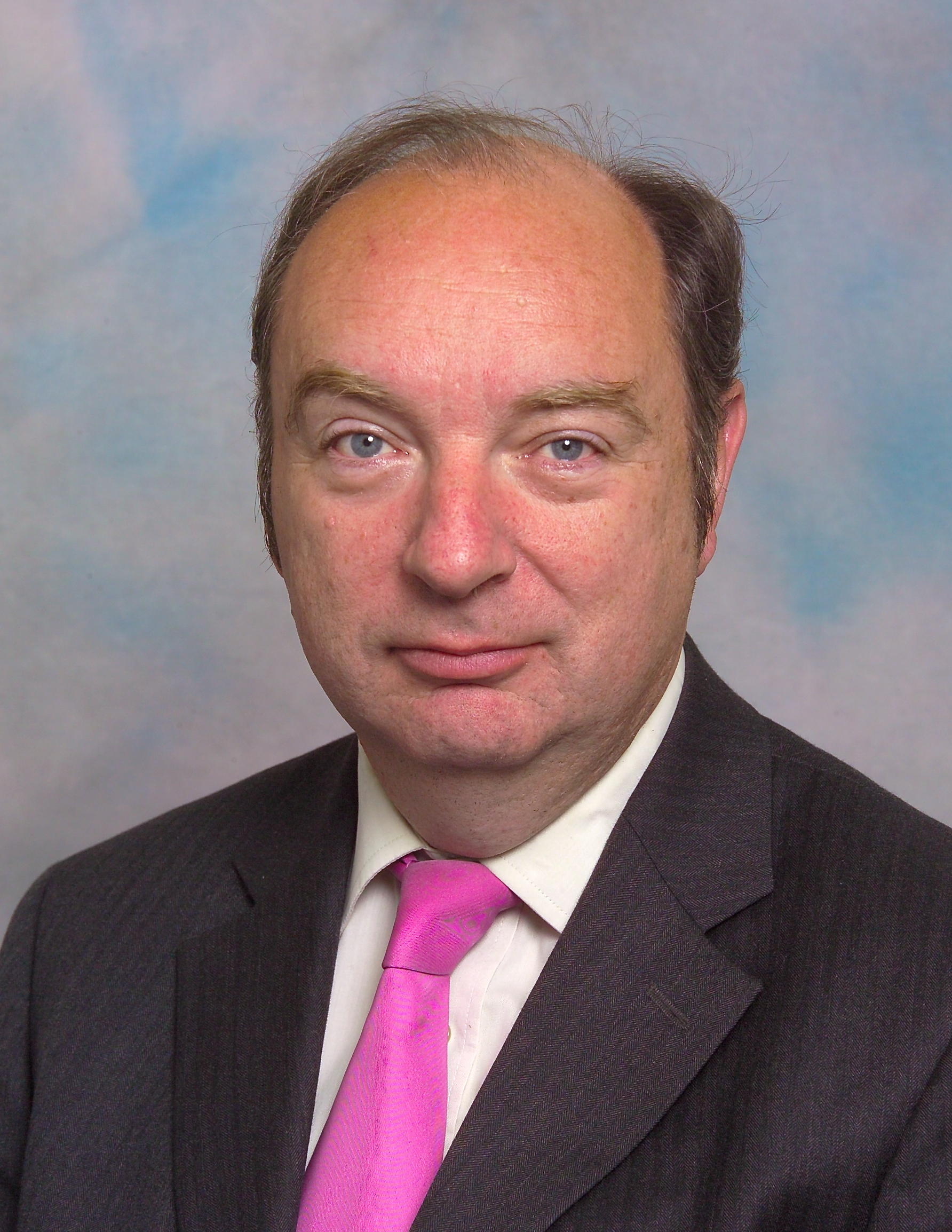
- Baker in 2010

Minister of State for Crime Prevention
- In office 7 October 2013 – 3 November 2014
- Prime Minister: David Cameron
- Preceded by: Jeremy Browne
- Succeeded by: Lynne Featherstone

Parliamentary Under-Secretary of State for Transport
- In office 15 May 2010 – 7 October 2013
- Prime Minister: David Cameron
- Preceded by: Paul Clark
- Succeeded by: Robert Goodwill
Shadow portfolios
2007–2010	Transport
2007	Duchy of Lancaster; Cabinet Office
2002–2006	Environment and Rural Affairs
1999–2001	Consumer Affairs and Broadcasting
1997–1999	Environment and Transport

Member of Parliament for Lewes
- In office 1 May 1997 – 30 March 2015
- Preceded by: Tim Rathbone
- Succeeded by: Maria Caulfield

Personal details
- Born: 26 July 1957 (age 69) Aberdeen, Scotland
- Party: Liberal Democrat
- Education: Royal Holloway, University of London (BA)

Norman John Baker (born 26 July 1957) is a Liberal Democrat politician in the United Kingdom who was the Member of Parliament (MP) for Lewes in East Sussex from the 1997 general election until his defeat in 2015.

In May 2010 he was appointed as Parliamentary under-secretary of state in the Department for Transport. On 7 October 2013, Baker was promoted to Minister of State at the Home Office in the coalition government of 2010–2015. He resigned from his role at the Home Office on 3 November 2014.

== Early life ==
Baker was born in Aberdeen, but his family moved to Hornchurch in east London in 1968. He was educated at the Royal Liberty School in Gidea Park, near Romford, and at Royal Holloway College, University of London, graduating in 1978 with a BA degree in German & History.

Baker joined the Liberal Party in 1981 while living in Islington and in his memoir he described himself as a 'sleeping' party member save for one canvassing session in six years. In 1985 he joined the then Ecology Party before seeking his first council seat in Ouse Valley ward of Lewes District Council in 1987. Two years later in 1989 Baker was also elected to the local county council of East Sussex. He became the Leader of Lewes District Council in 1991, a position he held until his election as an MP in 1997.

Outside of politics Baker was a regional director for Our Price Records for five years from 1978. He worked at Malling Street Service Station, Lewes, from 1983 to 1985. He taught English as a foreign language from 1985 to 1997, with a spell as a Liberal Democrat environment researcher in the House of Commons in 1989 to 1990.

== Parliamentary career ==
Baker contested Lewes at the 1992 general election, but the sitting Conservative Party MP Tim Rathbone retained the seat. He stood again at the 1997 election, and this time gained the seat with a majority of 1,300 votes over Rathbone, becoming Lewes's first non-Conservative MP since 1874.

Baker prided himself on "uncovering scandals and conflicts of interest among MPs and the government". His consistent questioning of Peter Mandelson may have helped lead to Mandelson's second resignation from government. He also raised issues about Lord Birt and his role as Tony Blair's adviser. After compiling figures in 2002, which revealed that the government's fleet of ministerial cars had grown to its largest ever size, he began in January 2005 to campaign to force disclosure of the details of MPs' expenses under the Freedom of Information Act, finally succeeding in February 2007. His success enabled The Daily Telegraph to publish details of his own expense claims, which included £3,000 for office rental.

In October 2001 he won a test case in the High Court, when the National Security Appeals panel ruled that the Data Protection Act required the security service MI5 to allow him access to information which he believed the security service holds on him, the first time this had happened in the 92-year history of MI5. In 2001 he was named "Inquisitor of the Year" in The Spectator Parliamentarian of the Year Awards, and in February 2002 he won the Channel 4 Opposition MP of the Year Award.

Baker is regarded as coming from the left-wing of the party, and until losing his seat was a member of the Beveridge Group within the Liberal Democrats. A staunch republican, he is also well known for his vocal support for animal rights groups, and he is a strong proponent for greater protection of animals under law. In 1997, The Times columnist Matthew Parris described him as a "classic House of Commons bore", and in the Commons in 2002, Labour MP Stephen Pound likened his speeches to "root canal surgery without anaesthetic", but Parris added in 2001 "You underestimate him at your peril. He has a habit of being right." He asked two parliamentary questions of the Ministry of Defence in 2006 and 2007 on the subject of what the Ministry calls "unexplained aerial phenomena" including: "To ask the Secretary of State for Defence whether his Department's unidentified flying objects project is extant; and if he will make a statement."

Following the 2008 Camp for Climate Action at the coal-fired Kingsnorth power station in Kent (since demolished), Baker called for an investigation into police tactics, saying he had witnessed unnecessarily aggressive policing and unprovoked violence against peaceful protesters during the event.

=== Front-bench career ===
In the 2001–05 Parliament, Baker was a member of the Joint Committee on Human Rights, and was appointed as Liberal Democrat Environment spokesman in 2002, a post he held until his resignation in 2006 following the election of Sir Menzies Campbell as party leader.

As Environment spokesman in May 2005, he joined with two former environment ministers, the Labour MP Michael Meacher and the Conservative John Gummer, to table a cross-party Early day motion No. 178 in support of a Climate Change Bill drafted by Friends of the Earth. The motion called for a Bill to be "brought forward in this Parliament so that annual cuts in carbon dioxide emissions of 3 per cent can be delivered in a framework that includes regular reporting and new scrutiny and corrective processes" and attracted 412 signatures. Baker also opposed nuclear power, describing it as "hopelessly uneconomic", and warning that new nuclear power stations "would generate vast quantities of nuclear waste and divert essential funding away from energy efficiency and renewable sources of energy."

He returned to the front bench in July 2007, when he was appointed as Liberal Democrat spokesman on the Cabinet Office and the Duchy of Lancaster. In December 2007, after the election of Nick Clegg as party leader, Baker (who had supported Clegg in the leadership contest) returned to the front bench as spokesman on Transport.

=== David Kelly ===
Baker announced on 19 May 2006 that he had decided to step down from the Liberal Democrats' front bench to pursue a quest to establish the truth behind the death in 2003 of David Kelly, an expert in biological warfare employed by the Ministry of Defence and a former United Nations weapons inspector in Iraq. Kelly's discussion with BBC Today programme journalist Andrew Gilligan about the British government's dossier on weapons of mass destruction (WMD) in Iraq inadvertently caused a major political scandal. Kelly had been found dead days after appearing before the Parliamentary committee investigating the scandal.

The Hutton Inquiry, a public inquiry into the circumstances surrounding his death, ruled that he had committed suicide and that Kelly had not in fact said some of the things attributed to him by Gilligan. Baker said that Hutton had "blatantly failed to get to the bottom of matters", and that "the more I look into it the less convinced I am by the explanation and the more unanswered questions appear which ought to have been addressed properly by the Hutton inquiry or by the coroner."

In July that year, Baker claimed that data had been wiped from the hard drive on one of his computers. Although some news reports suggested that this related to evidence showing Kelly's death was not a suicide, Baker maintained that none of his research on Kelly had been stored on that particular machine. In April 2007 he announced his findings, telling a meeting in Lewes:

I am convinced beyond a reasonable doubt that this could not be suicide. The medical evidence does not support it and David Kelly's state of mind and personality suggests otherwise. It was not an accident so I am left with the conclusion that it is murder."

His book, The Strange Death of David Kelly, was published in October 2007, and serialised in the Daily Mail. Some relatives of Kelly have expressed their displeasure at the publication. The husband of Kelly's sister Sarah said "It is just raking over old bones ... I can't speak for the whole family, but I've read it all [Baker's theories], every word, and I don't believe it." However, Baker writes in the book that other relatives of Kelly also think his death was suspicious.

=== Censure ===
In December 2007, Baker was criticised, but not fined by the House of Commons Committee on Standards and Privileges for a newsletter which contained an "advertising feature" about a Liberal Democrat MEP. The Committee's report concluded: "We agree with the Commissioner that this element of Mr Donovan's complaint should be upheld, and we reiterate that the inclusion of material of a party political nature is not permissible in publications funded from parliamentary allowances."

=== Tibet ===
Baker is President of the Tibet Society, and was a member of the UK All Party Parliamentary Group for Tibet.

In February 2008 he released a statement to mark International Mother Language Day saying "The Chinese government are following a deliberate policy of extinguishing all that is Tibetan, including their own language in their own country. It may be obvious, but Tibetan should be the official language of Tibet." Tibetan is an official language of Tibet and other Tibetan-inhabited areas in China. In school, the younger grades are taught in Tibetan for new ideas, but the rest is in Mandarin Chinese including for concepts in sciences and maths.

On 18 March 2008 he addressed Tibetan protesters outside the Chinese embassy in London, and also delivered a letter to Prime Minister Gordon Brown from six Tibetan students in the UK who were supporting Tibetans in the 2008 Tibetan unrest. The students' letter called for an end to the unrest's suppression, a UN investigation into it, and for unfettered media access in Tibet.

In March 2010, the BBC ran an investigation detailing 37 occasions that Baker failed to declare a financial interest in Tibet during parliamentary debates and questions, despite receiving hospitality from the Tibetan government-in-exile. Baker released a statement saying that it was an oversight.

=== Coalition Government ===
At the 2010 general election Baker was again returned as MP for Lewes. The Liberal Democrats entered a coalition agreement with the Conservative Party on 11 May 2010, and Baker was appointed Parliamentary under-secretary of state at the Department for Transport.

In 2013, Baker was quoted as saying that rail fares were "not that expensive" when compared to fares for rail travel in other countries, and that deals that were available reduced the price significantly. This was against fare increases of more than 50% for "the average season ticket" between 2003 and 2013.

In the October 2013 reshuffle, Baker was appointed to the Home Office as Minister of State, overseeing issues relating to national security, replacing fellow Liberal Democrat Jeremy Browne. In this role he repeatedly suggested changes to drug policy, saying that patients should have access to cannabis for cancer pain relief and multiple sclerosis and that all options regarding legal highs were under consideration. The Home Office repeatedly rejected progressive suggestions.

In December 2013, it was reported that Baker had encouraged the Director of Public Prosecutions to reopen or reconsider six cases involving female genital mutilation, as forbidden by the Prohibition of Female Circumcision Act 1985. Although this law had been on the books since 1985, there had been no prosecutions under it until February 2014, when it was announced that the first was scheduled soon thereafter. The Daily Telegraph estimated that, up to that point, 170,000 women had been subject to the assault. A doctor was the first person charged with an offence contrary to the Female Genital Mutilation Act 2003 in March 2014.

He was appointed a member of the Privy Council in 2014, giving him the right to the Honorific Title "The Right Honourable" for life.

Baker resigned from the Home Office on 3 November 2014, citing conflicts with Home Secretary Theresa May. On the same day, he described being the only Liberal Democrat in the Home Office as like being "a hippy at an Iron Maiden concert".

=== 2015 general election ===
On two occasions in the run-up to the election, the Liberal Democrat leader Nick Clegg visited the towns of Seaford, Lewes and Newhaven (which are within the Lewes constituency) with Baker. At the election Baker's majority of over 7,000 was overturned by the Conservative candidate Maria Caulfield, a nurse who beat him by 1,083 votes.

General election 2015: Lewes
Party	Candidate	Votes	%	±%
Conservative	Maria Caulfield	19,206	38.0	+1.3
Liberal Democrats	Norman Baker	18,123	35.9	−16.1
UKIP	Ray Finch	5,427	10.7	+7.3
Labour	Lloyd Russell-Moyle	5,000	9.9	+4.9
Green	Alfie Stirling	2,784	5.5	+4.1
Majority		1,083	2.1	
Turnout		50,540	72.7	−0.2

== Life after Parliament ==
In 2015, Baker, a keen music enthusiast, re-formed his old band The Reform Club, which announced that it would be releasing an album of 15 original songs on 25 March. Baker is the chief lyricist with music written by Mike Phipps. The band also includes Geoff Smith on bass and vocals, Chris Dartnell on drums and vocals, Mike Phipps on guitars, keyboards and vocals, Brian Wiseman on lead guitar and vocals, with Maxwell Gardner on guitar for live appearances. A second album, Never yesterday, is awaiting release. As Norman Baker and Friends, he released a four-track EP, Animal Countdown, in March 2015, which highlights the plight of endangered species. He also presents two radio shows on the local community radio station Seahaven FM, The Hidden 60s on Monday evenings and Anything Goes on Sunday mornings.

Baker's political memoir Against The Grain was published on 18 September 2015. In an interview with The Independent newspaper on 11 August he said he had no intention of seeking election again.

Baker was the managing director of The Big Lemon, a bus operator based in Brighton, from March 2017 to January 2018.

On 15 October 2019, Baker’s book, ... And What Do You Do?: What The Royal Family Don't Want You To Know, which critically examined the Royal Family's privileged status in public life, was released by Biteback Publishing.

On 10 September 2022, Baker attended the Accession Council for the Proclamation of King Charles III at St James's Palace, London.

== Publications ==
- Baker, Norman (8 October 2007). The Strange Death of David Kelly. Methuen. ISBN 978-1-84275-217-3.
- Baker, Norman (18 September 2015). Against the Grain. Biteback. ISBN 978-1-84954-941-7.
- Baker, Norman (15 October 2019). ... And What Do You Do?: What The Royal Family Don't Want You To Know. Biteback. ISBN 978-1-78590-491-2.
- Baker, Norman (25 November 2025). Royal Mint, National Debt: The shocking truth about the royals' finances. Biteback. ISBN 978-1-78590-992-4.

Parliament of the United Kingdom
Preceded by Tim Rathbone	Member of Parliament for Lewes; 1997–2015	Succeeded by Maria Caulfield
