= Beatrice Rathbone =

American-born British politician

Beatrice, Lady Wright MBE
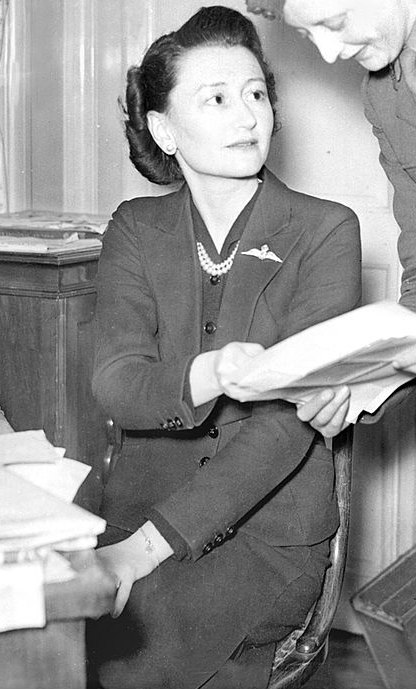
- Rathbone in 1943

Member of Parliament for Bodmin
- In office 11 March 1941 – 4 July 1945
- Preceded by: John Rathbone
- Succeeded by: Douglas Marshall

Personal details
- Born: Beatrice Frederika Clough; 17 June 1910 New Haven, Connecticut, U.S.
- Died: 17 March 2003 (aged 92)
- Party: Conservative
- Spouses: John Rathbone (m. 1932; died 1940) Paul Wright (m. 1942)
- Children: 3, including Tim Rathbone

Beatrice Frederika Wright, Lady Wright, MBE, formerly Rathbone, née Clough, (17 June 1910 – 17 March 2003), was an American-born British politician.

== Early life ==
Wright was born in New Haven, Connecticut, in the United States on 17 June 1910; her father was an international banker. She came to England as an exchange student at Christ Church, Oxford, where she met, and in 1932 married, John Rathbone, with whom she had two children, including Tim, later MP for Lewes. Her husband was elected in 1935 as Conservative Member of Parliament (MP) for Bodmin. When World War II broke out, John, a trained pilot joined the Royal Air Force as a fighter pilot, he was killed shortly after the Battle of Britain, aged 30. In March 1941, she was elected unopposed as his successor and sat in the House of Commons for the rest of the Second World War. She stepped down at the 1945 general election, after becoming the first sitting MP to give birth to a child.

== Later life ==
In 1942, she married Paul Wright, who had a distinguished career as a diplomat and was knighted in 1975. They both converted to the Roman Catholic Church. They had one child, Faith Beatrice Wright, who married firstly Julian Shuckburgh (son of Evelyn Shuckburgh), and secondly Colin Clark, younger brother of the politician and diarist Alan Clark.

She served as Vice President of the Royal National Institute for the Deaf from 1978 to 2003. In 1996, she was appointed an MBE.

In 1982, she co-founded the charity Hearing Dogs for Deaf People, along with vet Dr. Bruce Fogle (father of Ben Fogle), serving as the charity's president until 1988. The charity's northern training centre, in Bielby, East Riding of Yorkshire, is named the Beatrice Wright Training Centre after her, and her daughter Faith Clark served as trustee and chairman of the charity between 2002 and 2022.

An American-born woman would not be elected to Parliament again until 2019, when another Conservative, Joy Morrissey, was elected in that year's general election for Beaconsfield.

Parliament of the United Kingdom
| Preceded by John Rathbone | Member of Parliament for Bodmin; 1941–1945 | Succeeded by Sir Douglas Marshall |
