= Edward Murdstone =

- David Copperfield character
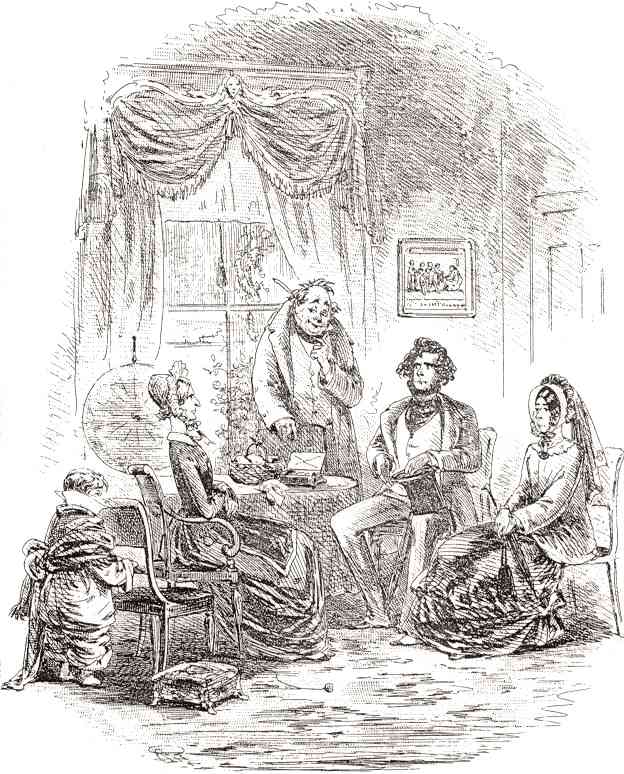
- Phiz: "The momentous interview". Edward Murdstone and his sister Jane discuss David Copperfield's future with his aunt, Betsey Trotwood.
- Created by: Charles Dickens

In-universe information
- Gender: Male
- Nationality: British

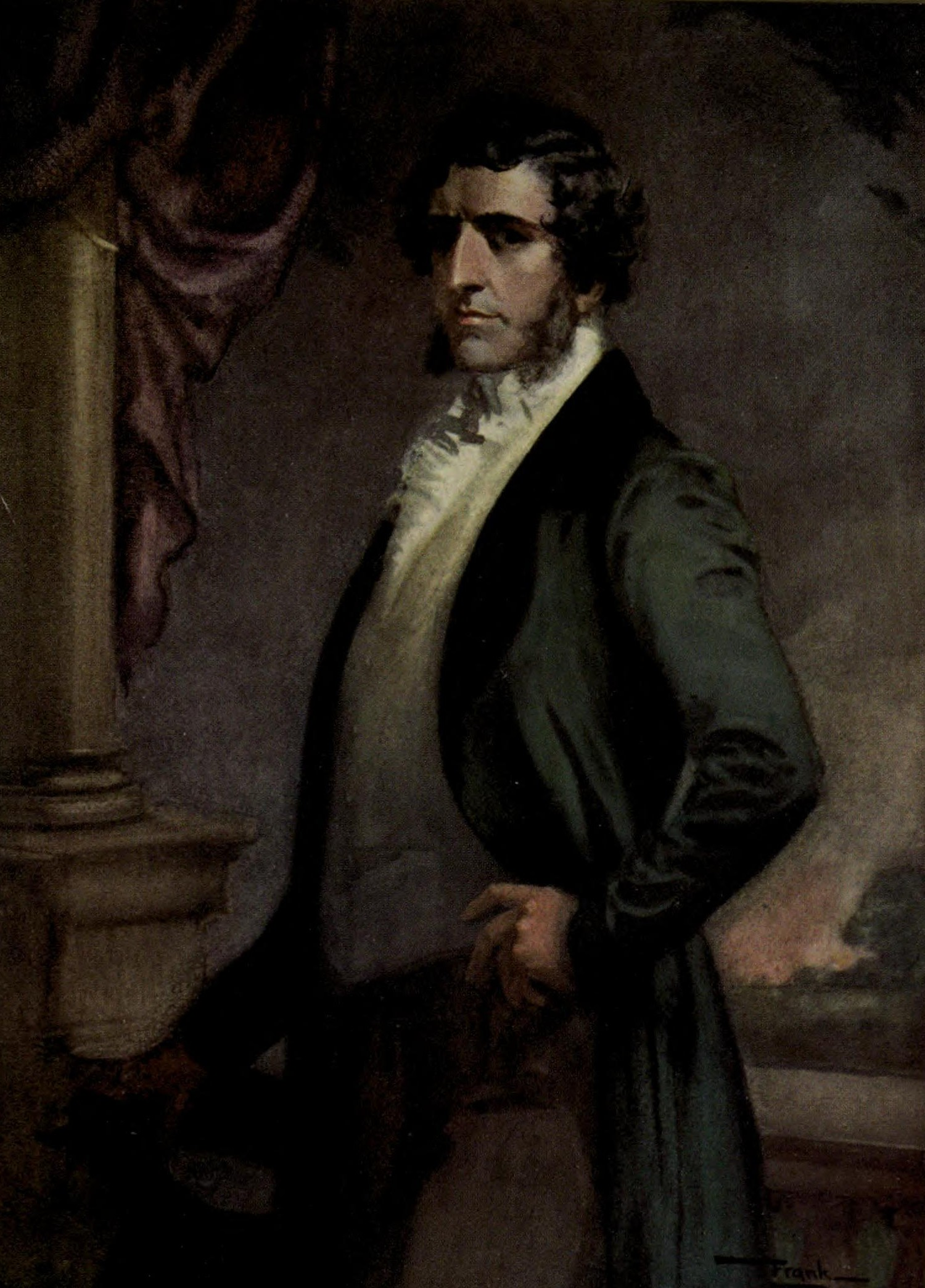
Edward Murdstone - by Frank Reynolds

Edward Murdstone (commonly known as Mr. Murdstone) is a fictional character and the primary antagonist in the first part of the Charles Dickens 1850 novel David Copperfield, secondary to Uriah Heep in the second part.

== Fictional character biography ==
Near the beginning of the novel, Murdstone marries Clara Copperfield when David is about eight years old (David's father died six months before David was born). This arrangement is done secretly (much to Peggotty's disapproval), while David is away at the Yarmouth seashore. Soon after the marriage and David's return home, Murdstone's sister Jane moves into the house at Blunderstone with them. However, the Murdstones begin to show a much darker and more sadistic side to their personalities, and with Clara's generally passive and forgiving demeanour, they manipulate her with psychological mind games until she comes to accept that the Copperfield household is no longer hers, but now belongs to the Murdstones.

Murdstone thrashes David merely for falling behind in his studies, and David retaliates by biting Murdstone's fingers severely. As a result of what Murdstone views as "sullen behaviour" (even though Murdstone himself deliberately started it), he sends David away to Salem House, a boarding school owned by his equally abusive friend, Mr Creakle, who singles David out for extra torment on Murdstone's request.

While David is at Salem House, Clara gives birth to her and Murdstone's son, but three months later, Clara and the baby both suddenly die. David is summoned home from Salem House and sent to work at Murdstone's wine bottling factory, Murdstone and Grinby's, in London. Murdstone also arranges for David to live with a friend called Wilkins Micawber, who takes good care of David. After being released from a debtors' prison, Mr Micawber is forced to move to Plymouth and David flees the factory to find his aunt Betsey Trotwood at Dover.

Murdstone later receives a letter from Miss Trotwood, informing him of David's arrival. He travels down to Dover to discuss David's future with Miss Trotwood, who eventually agrees to take over as David's legal guardian, but then blasts Murdstone for his appalling treatment of Clara and David, even insinuating that Murdstone only invited his sister to live with them to serve as his enforcer, referring to her as Murdstone's "instrument". Murdstone, apparently feeling remorse for the first time for his actions, merely leaves without a word.

Murdstone and his sister appear a few times later in the novel, associated in business with David's employer Mr. Spenlow. Near the end of the novel, the adult David learns from an old acquaintance that Murdstone, despite Aunt Betsey's scolding, reverted to his old ways, married a rich young woman and "since the sister came to help, the brother and sister between them have nearly reduced her to a state of imbecility".

== Film and television portrayals ==
Being one of the central antagonists of the novel, Murdstone has appeared in every adaptation of David Copperfield to date.

- In the 1935 film version, he is portrayed by Basil Rathbone.
- In the 1956 BBC adaptation, he was played by William Devlin. No recordings of the production are known to exist.
- In the 1966 BBC adaptation, he was played by Richard Leech. Only one episode to feature him (episode 3, 'A Long Journey') is known to exist.
- In the 1969 version, he is played by James Donald. In this version, Murdstone does not bother to search for David after he leaves for Dover, thus his argument with Betsey Trotwood is omitted.
- In the 1974 BBC TV series he is played by Gareth Thomas. This depiction is fairly faithful to the book, although he does not appear again after his scolding by Betsey Trotwood (Patience Collier).
- In the 1986 BBC TV series he is played by Oliver Cotton.
- In the 1993 version, he is portrayed by Michael York.
- In the 1999 BBC mini-series, Murdstone is portrayed by Trevor Eve. In this version, his role plays out fairly closely to the novel, only, like the 1974 version, he does not appear again after his scolding by Betsy Trotwood (Maggie Smith).
- In the 2000 British-American television film, he is portrayed by Anthony Andrews, who had played Steerforth in the 1974 BBC TV series. Murdstone appears much later in the film, where David is an adult and catches him dining with Jane and another young woman. David furiously confronts Murdstone and openly accuses him of murdering his mother. Murdstone denies it and challenges David to prove it in court, but David instead promises to write about it and destroy Murdstone's image once and for all, avenging his mother and ensuring that the Murdstones will never snatch away another family fortune again.
- In the 2019 version, he is portrayed by Darren Boyd.
- In the 1965 Italian Tv version of the David Copperfield novel, Mr. Murdstone is portrayed by Ubaldo Lay.
