= Basil Rathbone =

English actor (1892–1967)

Basil Rathbone MC
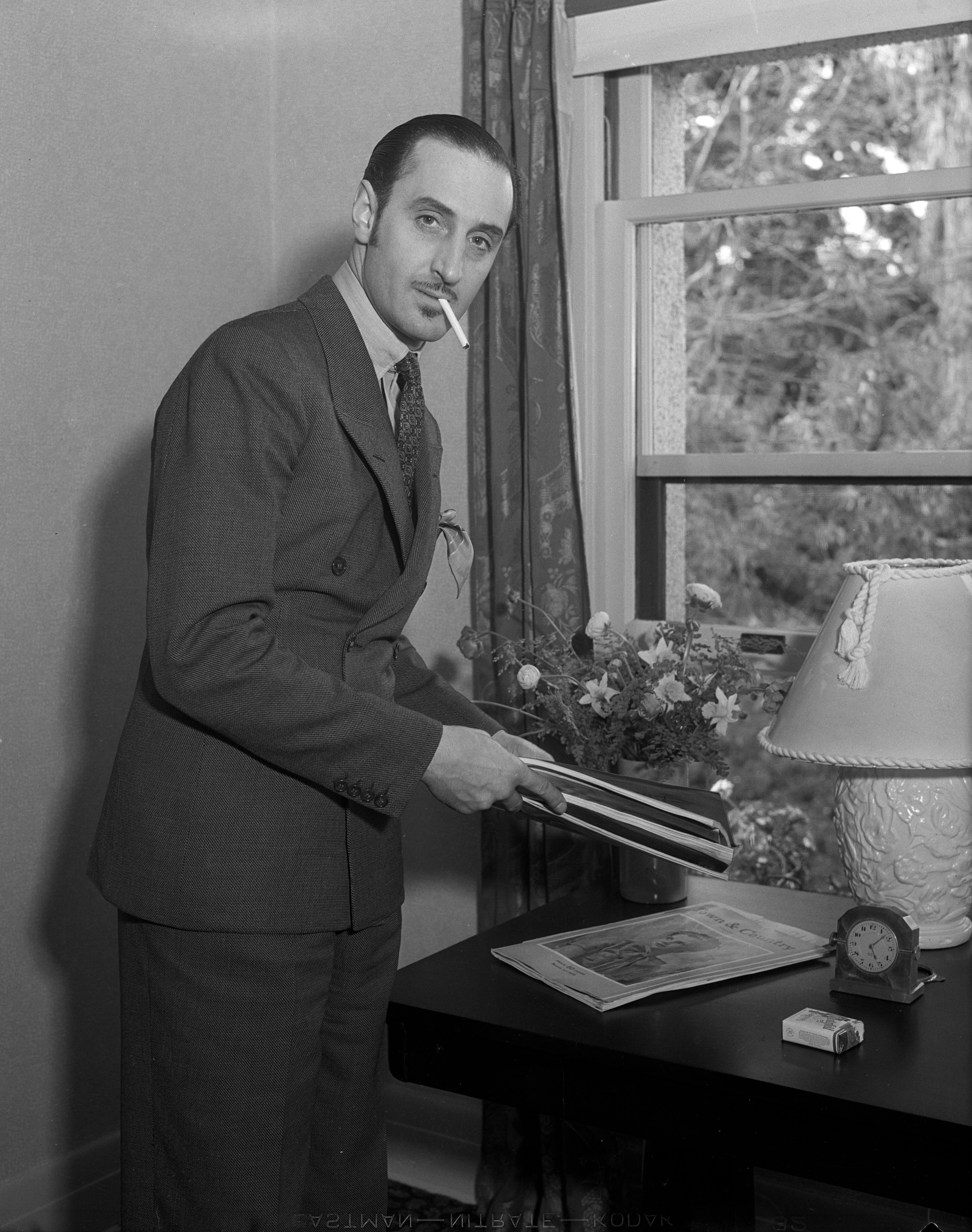
- Rathbone in 1935
- Born: Philip St. John Basil Rathbone; 13 June 1892; Johannesburg, South African Republic (present-day South Africa)
- Died: 21 July 1967 (aged 75); New York City, US
- Resting place: Ferncliff Cemetery Shrine of Memories, Hartsdale, New York, US
- Citizenship: United Kingdom
- Occupation: Actor
- Years active: 1911–1967
- Spouses: Ethel Marion Foreman (m. 1914; div. 1926) Ouida Bergère (m. 1926)
- Children: 2
- Relatives: Sir Frank Benson (cousin); William Rathbone V (great-grandfather); Eleanor Rathbone (first cousin once removed)
- Family: Rathbone
- Military career
- Allegiance: United Kingdom
- Branch: British Army
- Service years: 1915–1918
- Rank: Captain
- Units: London Scottish Regiment; Liverpool Scottish
- Awards: Military Cross

Philip St. John Basil Rathbone MC (13 June 1892 – 21 July 1967) was an English actor. Born in South Africa and raised in Derbyshire, he rose to prominence in the United Kingdom as a Shakespearean stage actor and went on to appear in more than 70 films, primarily costume dramas, swashbucklers, and, occasionally, horror films.

Rathbone frequently portrayed suave villains or morally ambiguous characters, such as Mr. Murdstone in David Copperfield (1935), Tybalt in Romeo and Juliet (1936) and Sir Guy of Gisbourne in The Adventures of Robin Hood (1938). His most famous role was that of Sherlock Holmes in fourteen Hollywood films made between 1939 and 1946 and in a radio series.

Rathbone's later career included roles on Broadway, as well as self-ironic film and television work. In 1948, he shared the Tony Award for Best Actor in a Play with two others. He was also nominated for two Academy Awards and honoured with three stars on the Hollywood Walk of Fame.

== Early life ==
Rathbone was born on 13 June, 1892, in Johannesburg, South African Republic. His mother, Anna Barbara (née George), was a violinist from Ireland, and his father, Edgar Philip Rathbone, was a mining engineer and scion of the Liverpool Rathbone family. He had two older half-brothers, Harold and Horace, as well as two younger siblings, Beatrice and John. Basil was the great-grandson of the noted Victorian philanthropist, William Rathbone V, and thus a descendant of William Rathbone II.

The Rathbones fled to Britain when Basil was three years old after his father was accused by the Boers of being a spy following the Jameson Raid. Rathbone attended Repton School in Derbyshire from 1906 to 1910, where he excelled at sports and was given the nickname "Ratters" by schoolmates. Thereafter, he was briefly employed as an insurance clerk by the Liverpool and Globe Insurance Companies, to appease his father's wish for him to have a conventional career.

On 22 April 1911, Rathbone made his first appearance on stage at the Theatre Royal, Ipswich, Suffolk, as Hortensio in The Taming of the Shrew, with his cousin Sir Frank Benson's No. 2 Company, under the direction of Henry Herbert. In October 1912, he went to the United States with Benson's company, playing roles such as Paris in Romeo and Juliet, Fenton in The Merry Wives of Windsor, and Silvius in As You Like It. Returning to Britain, he made his first appearance in London at the Savoy Theatre on 9 July 1914, as Finch in The Sin of David. That December, he appeared at the Shaftesbury Theatre as the Dauphin in Henry V. During 1915, he toured with Benson and appeared with him at London's Court Theatre in December as Lysander in A Midsummer Night's Dream.

== Military service ==
During the First World War (in 1915), Rathbone was called up via the Derby Scheme into the British Army as a private with the London Scottish Regiment, joining a regiment that also included his future professional acting contemporaries Claude Rains, Herbert Marshall and Ronald Colman at different points during the conflict. After basic training with the London Scots in early 1916, he received a commission as a lieutenant in the 2/10th Battalion of the King's Liverpool Regiment (Liverpool Scottish), where he served as an intelligence officer, eventually attaining the rank of captain.

Rathbone was a two-time British Army Fencing Champion; a skill that served him well in the movies, it allowed him to teach swordsmanship to actors Errol Flynn and Tyrone Power.

Rathbone was deeply affected by the news that his younger brother John, a captain in the Dorsetshire Regiment, had been killed in action near Arras on 4 June 1918. In 2012 two letters Rathbone wrote to his family while he was serving on the Western Front were published. One reveals the anguish and anger he felt following the death of John:

I want to tell him to mind his place. I think of his ridiculous belief that everything would always be well, his ever-hopeful smile, and I want to cuff him for a little fool. He had no business to let it happen and it maddens me that I shall never be able to tell him so, or change it or bring him back. I can't think of him without being consumed with anger at him for being dead and beyond anything I can do to him.

— 26 July 1918

Following his brother's death, Rathbone appears to have become unconcerned about the dangers of serving at the front. Richard Van Emden in Famous 1914–18 speculates that his extreme bravery may have been a form of guilt or a need for vengeance. He persuaded his superiors to allow him to scout enemy positions during daylight rather than at night, as was the usual practice to minimise the chance of detection. Rathbone wore a special camouflage suit that resembled a tree with a wreath of freshly plucked foliage on his head, and with burnt cork applied to his hands and face. As a result of these highly dangerous daylight reconnaissance missions in September 1918 he was awarded the Military Cross for "conspicuous daring and resource on patrol".

== Career ==
=== Theatre ===
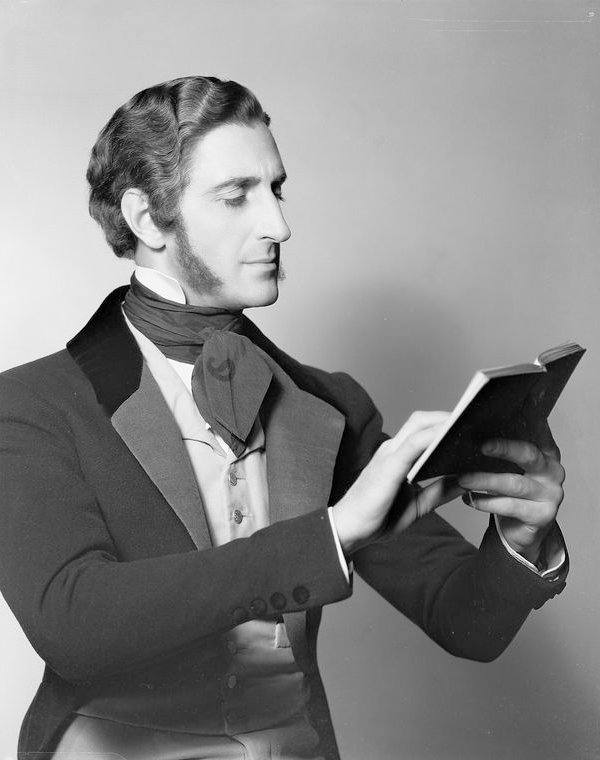
Rathbone as Robert Browning in Katharine Cornell's 1933–1934 touring production of The Barretts of Wimpole Street

During the Summer Festival of 1919, he appeared at Stratford-upon-Avon with the New Shakespeare Company playing Romeo, Cassius, Ferdinand in The Tempest and Florizel in The Winter's Tale; in October he was at London's Queen's Theatre as the aide de camp in Napoleon, and in February 1920 he was at the Savoy Theatre in the title role in Peter Ibbetson with huge success.

During the 1920s, Rathbone appeared regularly in Shakespearean and other roles on the British stage. He began to travel and appeared at the Cort Theatre, New York City, in October 1923 in a production of Molnár's play The Swan opposite Eva Le Gallienne, which made him a star on Broadway. He toured in the United States in 1925, appearing in San Francisco in May and the Lyceum Theatre, New York, in October. He was in the US again in 1927 and 1930 and again in 1931, when he appeared on stage with Ethel Barrymore. He continued his stage career in Britain, returning late in 1934 to the US, where he appeared with Katharine Cornell in several plays.

Rathbone was once arrested in 1926 along with every other member of the cast of The Captive, a play in which his character's wife left him for another woman. Though the charges were eventually dropped, Rathbone was very angry about the censorship because he believed that homosexuality needed to be brought into the open.

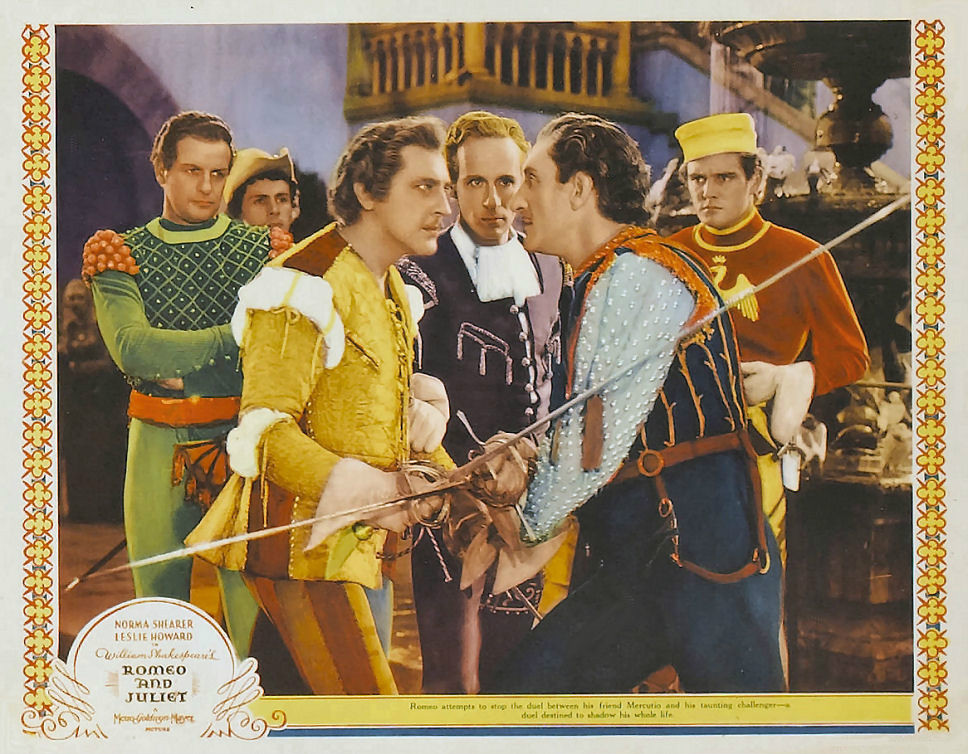
With John Barrymore and Leslie Howard in Romeo and Juliet, 1936

=== Film ===
He commenced his film career in Hollywood in 1921 in silent movies and appeared in 1923's The School for Scandal, and in The Masked Bride, plus a few other silents. His sound debut was in the first screen adaptation of Frederick Lonsdale's play The Last of Mrs. Cheyney (1929) opposite Norma Shearer, which was his last appearance as a romantic leading man. He portrayed detective Philo Vance in the 1930 film The Bishop Murder Case, based on the best-selling novel. In the film, there is a coincidental reference to Sherlock Holmes. Like George Sanders and Vincent Price after him, Rathbone made a name for himself in the 1930s by playing suave villains in costume dramas and swashbucklers, including David Copperfield (1935) as the abusive stepfather Mr. Murdstone; Anna Karenina (1935) as her distant husband, Karenin; The Last Days of Pompeii (1935) as Pontius Pilate; Captain Blood (1935); A Tale of Two Cities (1935), as the Marquis St. Evremonde; The Adventures of Robin Hood (1938) playing his best-remembered villain, Sir Guy of Gisbourne; The Adventures of Marco Polo (1938); and The Mark of Zorro (1940) as Captain Esteban Pasquale. He also appeared in several early horror films: Tower of London (1939), as Richard III, and Son of Frankenstein (1939), portraying the dedicated surgeon Baron Wolf von Frankenstein, son of the monster's creator, and, in 1949, was also the narrator for the segment "The Wind in the Willows" in the Disney animated feature, The Adventures of Ichabod and Mr. Toad.

He was admired for his athletic swordsmanship. (He listed fencing among his favourite recreations.) His character lost to Errol Flynn twice: in a duel on the beach in Captain Blood and in an elaborate fight sequence in The Adventures of Robin Hood. He was also involved in noteworthy sword fights in Tower of London, The Mark of Zorro, and The Court Jester. Rathbone earned Academy Award nominations for Best Actor in a Supporting Role for his performances as Tybalt in Romeo and Juliet (1936) and as King Louis XI in If I Were King (1938). In The Dawn Patrol (1938), he played one of his few heroic roles in the 1930s, as a Royal Flying Corps (RFC) squadron commander brought to the brink of a nervous breakdown by the strain and guilt of sending his battle-weary pilots off to near-certain death in the skies of 1915 France. Errol Flynn, Rathbone's perennial foe, starred in the film as his successor when Rathbone's character is promoted.

According to Hollywood legend, Rathbone was Margaret Mitchell's first choice to play Rhett Butler in the film version of her novel Gone with the Wind. Rathbone actively campaigned for the role.

Despite his film success, Rathbone always insisted that he wished to be remembered for his stage career. He said that his favourite role was Romeo.

=== The Sherlock Holmes films ===
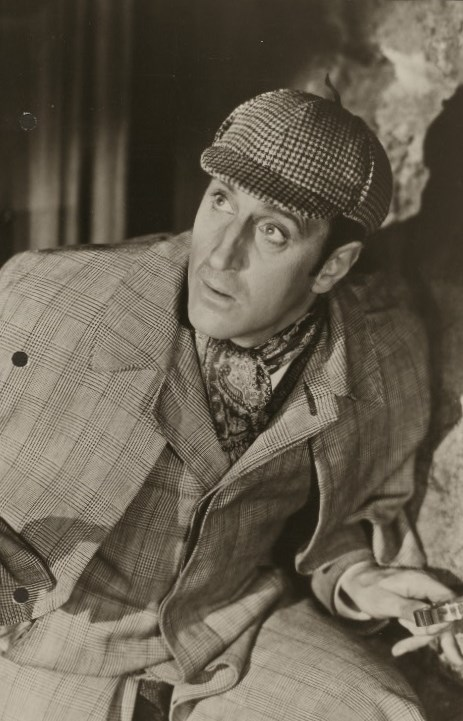
Rathbone as Sherlock Holmes

Rathbone is most widely recognised for his many portrayals of Sherlock Holmes. In a radio interview, Rathbone recalled that Twentieth Century-Fox producer and director Gene Markey, lunching with producer-director-actor Gregory Ratoff and 20th Century-Fox mogul Daryl Zanuck at Lucey's Restaurant in Hollywood, proposed a film version of Sir Arthur Conan Doyle's The Hound of the Baskervilles. When asked who could possibly play Holmes, Markey incredulously replied, "Who?! Basil Rathbone!" The film was so successful that Fox produced a sequel that appeared later in 1939. Interest in Holmes cooled at Fox, but Universal Pictures picked up the character, and produced 12 Holmes features from 1942 to 1946. All of the Fox and Universal features co-starred Nigel Bruce as Dr. Watson.

The first two films, The Hound of the Baskervilles and The Adventures of Sherlock Holmes (both produced by Fox in 1939), were set in the late Victorian times of the original stories. The later instalments, produced by Universal, beginning with Sherlock Holmes and the Voice of Terror (1942), were set in contemporary times, with the first three having World War II-related plots.

Concurrent with the films, Rathbone and Bruce reprised their film roles in the radio series The New Adventures of Sherlock Holmes, which began in October 1939. Rathbone appeared in the radio series as long as the film series was active, but, after the films lapsed in 1946, Rathbone ceded his radio part to Tom Conway. Conway and Bruce carried on with the series for two seasons, until both dropped out in July 1947.

The many Holmes sequels typecast Rathbone, and he was unable to free himself from the shadow of the Great Detective, despite appearing in other film roles. Resenting the typecasting, Rathbone refused to renew his contract at Metro-Goldwyn-Mayer and returned to Broadway. In later years, Rathbone willingly made the Holmes association, as in a TV sketch with Milton Berle in the early 1950s, in which he donned the deerstalker cap and Inverness cape. In the 1960s, dressed as Holmes, he appeared in a series of TV commercials for Getz Exterminators ("Getz gets 'em, since 1888!'").

In 1953, Rathbone played the detective in The Adventure of the Black Baronet, an episode of the anthology television series Suspense. Later that year, he also brought Holmes to the stage in a play written by his wife Ouida. Thomas Gomez, who had appeared as a Nazi ringleader in Sherlock Holmes and the Voice of Terror, played the villainous Professor Moriarty. Nigel Bruce was slated to portray Dr Watson once more but became too ill and the part was played by character actor Jack Raine. Bruce's absence depressed Rathbone, particularly after Bruce died on 8 October 1953, while the play was in rehearsals. The play ran for only three performances.

=== Later career ===
In the 1950s, Rathbone appeared in two spoofs of his earlier swashbuckling villains: Casanova's Big Night (1954) opposite Bob Hope and The Court Jester (1956) with Danny Kaye. He appeared frequently on TV game shows and continued to appear in major films, including the Humphrey Bogart comedy We're No Angels (1955) and John Ford's political drama The Last Hurrah (1958).

Rathbone also appeared on Broadway numerous times in this period. In 1948, he shared the Tony Award for Best Actor in a Play for his performance as the unyielding Dr. Austin Sloper in the original production of The Heiress with Henry Fonda (for Mister Roberts) and Paul Kelly (for Command Decision). He also received accolades for his performance in Archibald Macleish's J.B., a modernisation of the Biblical trials of Job.

Through the 1950s and 1960s, he continued to appear in several dignified anthology programmes on television. To support his second wife's lavish tastes, he appeared as a panelist on the television game show The Name's the Same (in 1954), and took roles in cheap film thrillers of far lesser quality, such as The Black Sleep (1956), Queen of Blood (1966), The Ghost in the Invisible Bikini (1966, wherein the character 'Eric Von Zipper' played by Harvey Lembeck jokes, "That guy looks like Sherlock Holmes"), Hillbillys in a Haunted House (1967, also featuring Lon Chaney Jr and John Carradine), and his last film, a low-budget, horror film called Autopsy of a Ghost (1968).

He is also known for his spoken word recordings, including his interpretation of Clement C. Moore's "The Night Before Christmas". Rathbone's readings of the stories and poems of Edgar Allan Poe are collected together with readings by Vincent Price in Caedmon Audio's The Edgar Allan Poe Audio Collection on CD.

In four Caedmon albums, Rathbone revisited his characterisation of Sherlock Holmes. The first, "The Speckled Band" (Caedmon Records TC 1172, recorded in 1963), is a straight narration of the tale. In the rest, he changes his voice for each character, including a rendition of Nigel Bruce as Dr. Watson.

Rathbone also made many other recordings, including Oliver Twist, Prokofiev's Peter and the Wolf (with Leopold Stokowski conducting), and Charles Dickens's A Christmas Carol.

On television, he appeared in two musical versions of Dickens's A Christmas Carol: one in 1954, in which he played Marley's Ghost opposite Fredric March's Scrooge, and the original 1956 live action version of The Stingiest Man in Town (1956), in which he starred as a singing Ebenezer Scrooge.

In the 1960s, he toured with a one-man show, In and Out of Character (the same title as his autobiography). He recited poetry and Shakespeare, accented by reminiscences from his life and career (including the humorous, "I could have killed Errol Flynn any time I wanted to!"). As an encore, he recited "221B", a poem written by writer-critic Vincent Starrett, one of the preeminent members of the Baker Street Irregulars whom Rathbone held in high regard.

Price and Rathbone appeared together, along with Boris Karloff, in Tower of London (1939) and The Comedy of Terrors (1963). The latter was the only film to feature the "Big Four" of American International Pictures' horror films: Price, Rathbone, Karloff and Peter Lorre. Rathbone appeared with Price in the final segment of Roger Corman's 1962 anthology film Tales of Terror, a loose dramatisation of Poe's "The Facts in the Case of M. Valdemar".

In 1965, Belmont Books issued the anthology Basil Rathbone Selects Strange Tales, a collection of horror stories by Poe, Hawthorne, Bulwer-Lytton, Charles Dickens, Allston Collins, Le Fanu, and Wilkie Collins. The volume features a cover portrait of Rathbone; however, the back cover's legend "Produced by Lyle Kenyon Engel" indicates the anthology probably was not edited by Rathbone. Canadian editor and book packager Engel packaged shows and magazines for other horror stars, including Boris Karloff.

Basil Rathbone has three stars on the Hollywood Walk of Fame: one for films at 6549 Hollywood Boulevard; one for radio at 6300 Hollywood Boulevard; and one for television at 6915 Hollywood Boulevard in Hollywood.

== Personal life ==
Rathbone married actress Ethel Marion Foreman (1887–1976) in 1914. They had one son. The couple divorced in 1926. In the same year, he married writer Ouida Bergère; their infant child died in 1928. In 1939, the couple adopted a daughter. The American actor Jackson Rathbone is a distant relation.

Rathbone bore a strong resemblance to his cousin, the actor Frank Benson. He was a first cousin once removed of the campaigning independent British MP Eleanor Rathbone.

During Rathbone's Hollywood career Ouida Rathbone, who was also her husband's business manager, developed a reputation for hosting elaborate and expensive parties in their home, with many prominent and influential people on the guest lists. This trend inspired a joke in The Ghost Breakers (1940), a film in which Rathbone does not appear: during a tremendous thunderstorm in New York City Bob Hope observes that "Basil Rathbone must be throwing a party." Actress Mrs Patrick Campbell described Rathbone as "two profiles pasted together". As cited in the same autobiography, Mrs Campbell later referred to him as "a folded umbrella taking elocution lessons".

== Death ==
Rathbone died suddenly of a heart attack in New York City on 21 July 1967 at the age of 75. His body was interred in a crypt in the Shrine of Memories Mausoleum at Ferncliff Cemetery in Hartsdale, New York.

== Filmography ==
=== Film ===
Year	Title	Role	Notes
1921	Innocent	Amadis de Jocelyn	
1921	The Fruitful Vine	Don Cesare Carelli	
1923	The School for Scandal	Joseph Surface	
1923	The Loves of Mary, Queen of Scots	Bit part	Uncredited
1924	Trouping with Ellen	Tony Winterslip	Lost film
1925	The Masked Bride	Antoine	Lost film
1926	The Great Deception	Rizzio	Lost film
1929	The Last of Mrs. Cheyney	Lord Arthur Dilling	
1930	The Bishop Murder Case	Philo Vance	
1930	This Mad World	Paul Parisot	
1930	A Notorious Affair	Paul Gherardi	
1930	The Flirting Widow	Colonel John "Johnny" Vaughn-Smith	
1930	The Lady of Scandal	Edward, Duke of Warrington	
1930	The Lady Surrenders	Carl Vandry	
1930	Sin Takes a Holiday	Reginald "Reggie" Durant	
1932	A Woman Commands	Capt. Alex Pastitsch	
1932	After the Ball	Jack Harrowby	
1933	One Precious Year	Derek Nagel	
1933	Loyalties	Ferdinand de Levis	
1935	David Copperfield	Mr. Murdstone	
1935	Anna Karenina	Karenin	
1935	The Last Days of Pompeii	Pontius Pilate	
1935	A Feather in Her Hat	Captain Randolph Courtney	
1935	Kind Lady	Henry Abbott	
1935	A Tale of Two Cities	Marquis St. Evremonde	
1935	Captain Blood	Levasseur	
1936	Private Number	Thomas Wroxton	
1936	Romeo and Juliet	Tybalt	Nominated–Academy Award for Best Supporting Actor
1936	The Garden of Allah	Count Ferdinand Anteoni	
1937	Love from a Stranger	Gerald Lovell	
1937	Confession	Michael Michailow, aka Michael Koslov	
1937	Make a Wish	Johnny Selden	
1937	Tovarich	Commissar Dimitri Gorotchenko	
1938	The Adventures of Marco Polo	Ahmed	
1938	The Adventures of Robin Hood	Sir Guy of Gisbourne	
1938	If I Were King	King Louis XI	Nominated–Academy Award for Best Supporting Actor
1938	The Dawn Patrol	Major Brand	
1939	Son of Frankenstein	Baron Wolf von Frankenstein	
1939	The Hound of the Baskervilles	Sherlock Holmes	
1939	The Sun Never Sets	Clive Randolph	
1939	The Adventures of Sherlock Holmes	Sherlock Holmes	
1939	Rio	Paul Reynard	
1939	Tower of London	Richard – Duke of Gloucester	
1940	Rhythm on the River	Oliver Courtney	
1940	The Mark of Zorro	Captain Esteban Pasquale	
1941	The Mad Doctor	Dr. George Sebastian	
1941	The Black Cat	Montague Hartley	
1941	International Lady	Reggie Oliver	
1941	Paris Calling	Andre Benoit	
1942	Fingers at the Window	Cesar Ferrari / Dr. H. Santelle	
1942	Crossroads	Henri Sarrou	
1942	Sherlock Holmes and the Voice of Terror	Sherlock Holmes	
1942	Sherlock Holmes and the Secret Weapon	Sherlock Holmes	
1943	Sherlock Holmes in Washington	Sherlock Holmes	
1943	Above Suspicion	Sig von Aschenhausen	
1943	Sherlock Holmes Faces Death	Sherlock Holmes	
1943	Crazy House	Sherlock Holmes	Cameo appearance
1943	The Spider Woman	Sherlock Holmes	
1944
1944	Bathing Beauty	George Adams	
1944	The Pearl of Death	Sherlock Holmes	
1944	The Scarlet Claw	Sherlock Holmes	
1944	Frenchman's Creek	Lord Rockingham	
1945	The House of Fear	Sherlock Holmes	
1945	The Woman in Green	Sherlock Holmes	
1945	Pursuit to Algiers	Sherlock Holmes	
1946	Terror by Night	Sherlock Holmes	
1946	Heartbeat	Professor Aristide	
1946	Dressed to Kill	Sherlock Holmes	
1949	The Adventures of Ichabod and Mr. Toad	Narrator	Segment: "The Wind in the Willows"
1954	Casanova's Big Night	Lucio / Narrator	
1955	We're No Angels	Andre Trochard	
1955	The Court Jester	Sir Ravenhurst	
1956	The Black Sleep	Sir Joel Cadman	
1958	The Last Hurrah	Norman Cass Sr.	
1961	The Black Cat	Voices	Short film
1961	Mystic Prophecies and Nostradamus	Narrator	
1962	The Magic Sword	Lodac	
1962	Ponzio Pilato	Caiaphas	
1962	Tales of Terror	Carmichael	Segment: "The Facts in the Case of M. Valdemar"
1962	Two Before Zero (aka Red Hell)	Narrator	
1963	The Comedy of Terrors	John F. Black, Esq.	
1965	Voyage to the Prehistoric Planet	Prof. Hartman, Lunar 7	
1965	Dr. Rock and Mr. Roll		
1966	Queen of Blood	Dr. Farraday	
1966	The Ghost in the Invisible Bikini	Reginald Ripper	
1967	Hillbillys in a Haunted House	Gregor	final film released during his lifetime
1968	Autopsia de un fantasma	Canuto Perez	final film role, released posthumously
1986	The Great Mouse Detective	Sherlock Holmes	archive sound, released posthumously

=== Television ===
Year	Title	Role	Notes
1953	Season's Greetings		TV movie
1954	Shower of Stars	Jacob Marley	Episode: "A Christmas Carol"
1954	Schlitz Playhouse of Stars	General Lee	Episode: "The General's Boots"
1955	Svengali and the Blonde	Svengali	TV movie
1953	The Alcoa Hour	Ebenezer Scrooge	Episode: "The Stingiest Man in Town"
1957	The Lark	Chief Inquisitor	TV movie
1958	Hans Brinker and the Silver Skates	Dr. Boekman	TV movie
1961	Hallmark Hall of Fame	Benjamin Disraeli	Episode: "Victoria Regina"

== Radio appearances ==
Year	Program	Episode/source
1937	Lux Radio Theatre	Captain Blood
1939–46	The New Adventures of Sherlock Holmes	
1943	Lux Radio Theatre	The Phantom of the Opera
1949	Tales of Fatima	
1952	Theatre Guild on the Air	Oliver Twist
1952	Theatre Guild on the Air	The Winslow Boy

== Stage credits ==
Year	Title	Role(s)	Venue(s)	Notes	Ref.
1913	As You Like It	Silvius	Shakespeare Memorial Theatre; North American tour		
1913	Hamlet	Guildenstern	Shakespeare Memorial Theatre; North American tour		
1913	Henry IV, Part 2	Westmoreland	Shakespeare Memorial Theatre; North American tour		
1913	King John	Lewis	Shakespeare Memorial Theatre; North American tour		
1913	The Merchant of Venice	Lorenzo	Shakespeare Memorial Theatre; North American tour		
1913	The Merry Wives of Windsor	Fenton	Shakespeare Memorial Theatre; North American tour		
1913	Richard II	Duke of Aumerle	Shakespeare Memorial Theatre; North American tour		
1913	Romeo and Juliet	Paris	Shakespeare Memorial Theatre; North American tour		
1913	Twelfth Night	Sebastian	Shakespeare Memorial Theatre; North American tour		
1913	Richelieu	Clermont	Shakespeare Memorial Theatre		
1913	The Tragedy of Pompey the Great	Sailor	Shakespeare Memorial Theatre		
1913	Henry V	Louis the Dauphin	North American tour		
1914	As You Like It	Silvius	Shakespeare Memorial Theatre		
1914	Hamlet	Guildenstern	Shakespeare Memorial Theatre		
1914	Henry IV, Part 2	Earl of Westmoreland, Poins	Shakespeare Memorial Theatre		
1914	Henry V	Louis the Dauphin	Shakespeare Memorial Theatre		
1914	Julius Caesar	Octavius Caesar	Shakespeare Memorial Theatre		
1914	The Merchant of Venice	Lorenzo	Shakespeare Memorial Theatre		
1914	The Merry Wives of Windsor	Fenton	Shakespeare Memorial Theatre		
1914	Much Ado About Nothing	Conrad	Shakespeare Memorial Theatre		
1914	Richard II	Duke of Aumerle	Shakespeare Memorial Theatre		
1914	Romeo and Juliet	Paris	Shakespeare Memorial Theatre		
1914	She Stoops to Conquer	Tom Twist	Shakespeare Memorial Theatre		
1914	Twelfth Night	Sebastian	Shakespeare Memorial Theatre		
1915	Julius Caesar	Octavius Caesar	Shakespeare Memorial Theatre		
1915	Romeo and Juliet	Romeo	Shakespeare Memorial Theatre		
1915	The Merchant of Venice	Bassanio	Shakespeare Memorial Theatre		
1915	The Merry Wives of Windsor	Mr Page	Shakespeare Memorial Theatre		
1915	Hamlet	Laertes	Shakespeare Memorial Theatre		
1915	Henry V	Louis the Dauphin	Shakespeare Memorial Theatre		
1915	The Taming of the Shrew	Lucentio	Shakespeare Memorial Theatre		
1915	Richard III	Duke of Norfolk, Lord Hastings	Shakespeare Memorial Theatre		
1915	Twelfth Night	Orsino	Shakespeare Memorial Theatre		
1915	Coriolanus	Tullus Aufidius	Shakespeare Memorial Theatre		
1915	Richard II	Duke of Aumerle	Shakespeare Memorial Theatre		
1915	Henry IV, Part 2	Prince Henry	Shakespeare Memorial Theatre		
1915	As You Like It	Orlando	Shakespeare Memorial Theatre		
1915	Paolo and Francesca	Paolo	Shakespeare Memorial Theatre		
1919	The Merry Wives of Windsor	Fenton	Shakespeare Memorial Theatre		
1919	The Winter's Tale	Florizel	Shakespeare Memorial Theatre		
1919	Julius Caesar	Cassius	Shakespeare Memorial Theatre		
1919	A Midsummer Night's Dream	Lysander	Shakespeare Memorial Theatre		
1919	The Tempest	Ferdinand	Shakespeare Memorial Theatre		
1919	Romeo and Juliet	Romeo	Shakespeare Memorial Theatre		
1922	The Czarina	Count Alexei Czerny	Empire Theatre	Broadway debut	
1923	The Swan	Dr. Nicholas Agi	Cort Theatre		
1924	The Swan	Dr. Nicholas Agi	Empire Theatre		
1924	The Assumption of Hannele	Gottwald, The Stranger	Cort Theatre		
1925	The Grand Duchess and the Waiter	Albert	Lyceum Theatre		
1926	Port O' London	Anthony Pook	Daly's 63rd Street Theatre		
1926	The Captive	Jacques Virieu	Empire Theatre		
1927	Love is Like That	Vladimir Dubriski	Cort Theatre		
1927	Julius Caesar	Cassius	New Amsterdam Theatre		
1927	The Guardsman	performer	Cape Playhouse		
1927	Peter Ibbetson	performer	Cape Playhouse		
1927	The Grand Duchess and the Waiter	performer	Cape Playhouse		
1927	Outward Bound	performer	Cape Playhouse		
1927	The Command to Love	Gaston, Marquis du Saint-Lac	Longacre Theatre		
1929	Judas	Judas	Longacre Theatre	co-authored by Rathbone and Walter Ferris	
1930	A Kiss of Importance	Christian Saint Obin	Fulton Theatre		
1931	Heat Wave	Hugh Dawltry	Fulton Theatre		
1931	Melo	Marcel Blanc	Ethel Barrymore Theatre		
1932	The Devil Passes	Rev. Nicholas Lucy	Selwyn Theatre		
1934	Romeo and Juliet	Romeo	Martin Beck Theatre		
1946	Obsession	Maurice	Plymouth Theatre		
1947	The Heiress	Dr. Austin Sloper	Biltmore Theatre	Tony Award for Best Actor in a Play	
1949	The Heiress	Dr. Austin Sloper	Cape Playhouse		
1950	The Heiress	Dr. Austin Sloper	New York City Center		
1950	Julius Caesar	Cassius	Arena Theatre		
1950	The Gioconda Smile	Henry Hutton	Lyceum Theatre		
1950	The Gioconda Smile	Henry Hutton	Fulton Theatre		
1952	Jane	William Tower	Coronet Theatre		
1953	Sherlock Holmes	Sherlock Holmes	New Century Theatre	written by Ouida Bergère	
1957	Hide and Seek	Sir Roger Johnson	Ethel Barrymore Theatre		
1957	Witness for the Prosecution	performer	Cape Playhouse		
1959	J.B.	Mr Zuss	ANTA Playhouse	replacement	

== See also ==
- List of actors with Academy Award nominations
