= Greenbank House =

Listed building in Liverpool, England

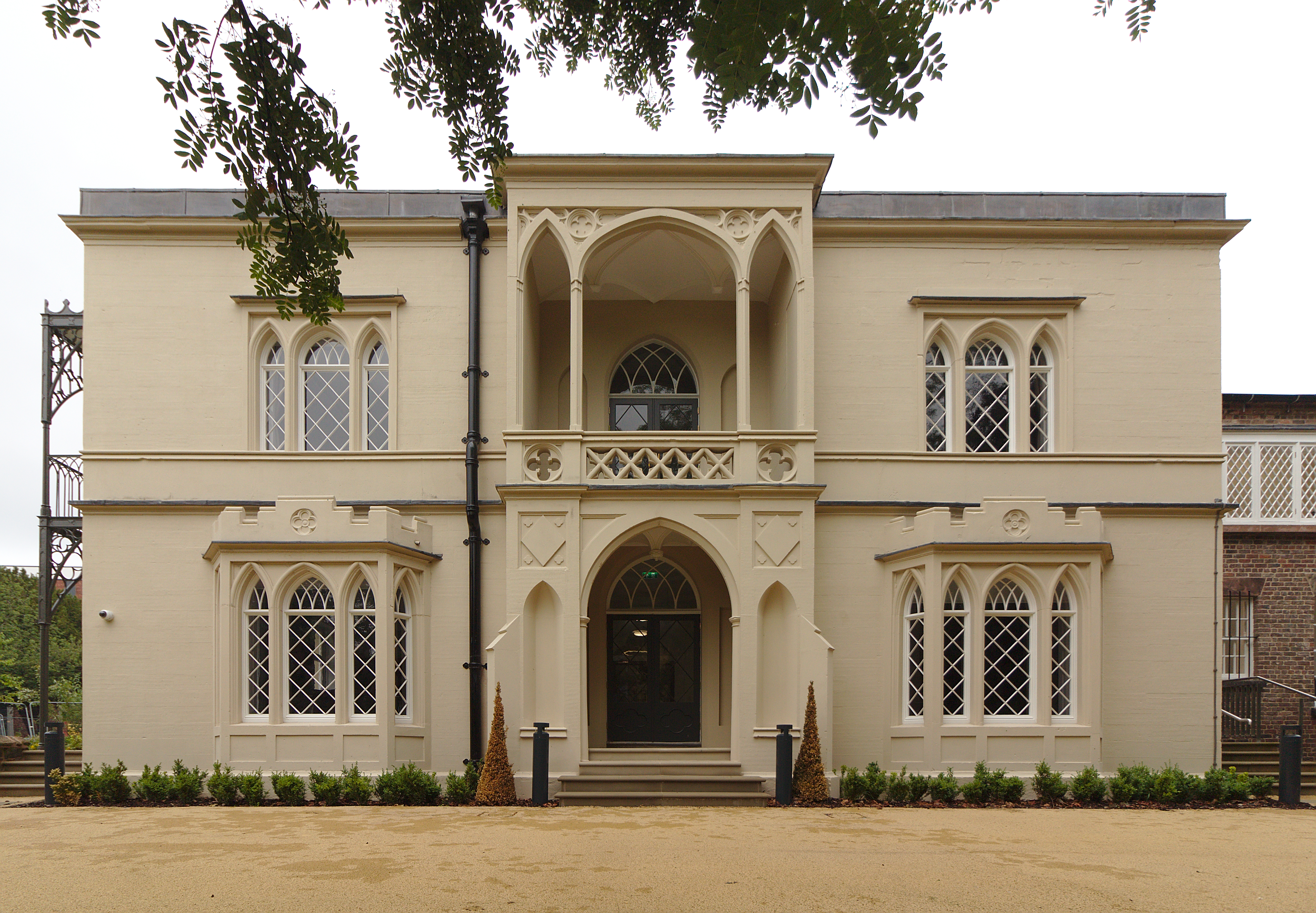
- Front elevation

General information
- Address: Liverpool, Merseyside, England
- Coordinates: 53°23′06″N 2°55′34″W
- Year(s) built: c. 1787 or earlier
- Renovated: 1812–16 (remodelled and extended); Late 19th century (extended); 1963 (altered)
- Designations

Listed Building – Grade II*
- Official name: University Hostel and Greenbank House
- Designated: 28 June 1952
- Reference no.: 1356362

Greenbank House is a Grade II* listed building in Liverpool, England. It stands within the University of Liverpool's Greenbank Halls of Residence site, between Greenbank Road and Greenbank Lane.

== History ==
=== Original house ===
The original house was built in the early 18th century on part of the Toxteth Park estate. In 1788 William Rathbone IV leased the family house and estate, which consisted of 24 acres (9.7 ha) of land, from the Earl of Sefton to serve as a country retreat for his young family.

=== Rathbone family ===
The Rathbone family purchased the freehold of Greenbank House in 1809, the year of William Rathbone IV's death. Following his death, the house was left to his widow Hannah Mary Rathbone for her lifetime. She made a number of substantial alterations to the building. A large part was rebuilt in the Strawberry Hill Gothic style and a cast-iron screen was added to the house to form a verandah and balcony. Internal changes were also made.

In 1812 following the marriage of William Rathbone V to Elizabeth Greg, Hannah Mary retired to a purpose built cottage nearby. The American artist John James Audubon visited the Rathbone family at Greenbank House during his visit to Liverpool in the 1820s. The writer Nathaniel Hawthorne and his wife Sophia Peabody Hawthorne were also guests of the Rathbones during Hawthorne's time in Liverpool as the United States consul.

Some of the land had passed from Rathbone family control in 1897, when Liverpool Corporation entered into an agreement with the Rathbone family to purchase the piece of land, part of which is now Greenbank Park. Greenbank was occupied by Hugh Reynolds Rathbone and Emily Evelyn Rathbone in 1918 on the death of Emily Acheson Rathbone, widow of William Rathbone VI. Hugh Reynolds Rathbone had strong connections with the University of Liverpool, and towards the ends of their lives Hugh and Emily donated parts of the Greenbank estate to the university as a site for student accommodation. On land donated in 1929, the university built Derby Hall, which opened in 1939.

=== University of Liverpool ===
The house and remaining estate remained in Rathbone hands until the death of Hugh Reynolds Rathbone on 19 January 1940. Between 1939 and 1948, remaining parts of the estate were donated by Hugh and Emily's children. The house itself was requisitioned by the Admiralty in 1940, but in 1944 it too was donated to the university. It formed an annexe to Derby Hall until 1963–64, when it was converted for use as a student and staff social club.

The University of Liverpool is in the process of renovating the house, with the intention of reinstating its original features. On completion, the house will be used for university teaching facilities.

== Architecture ==
=== Exterior ===
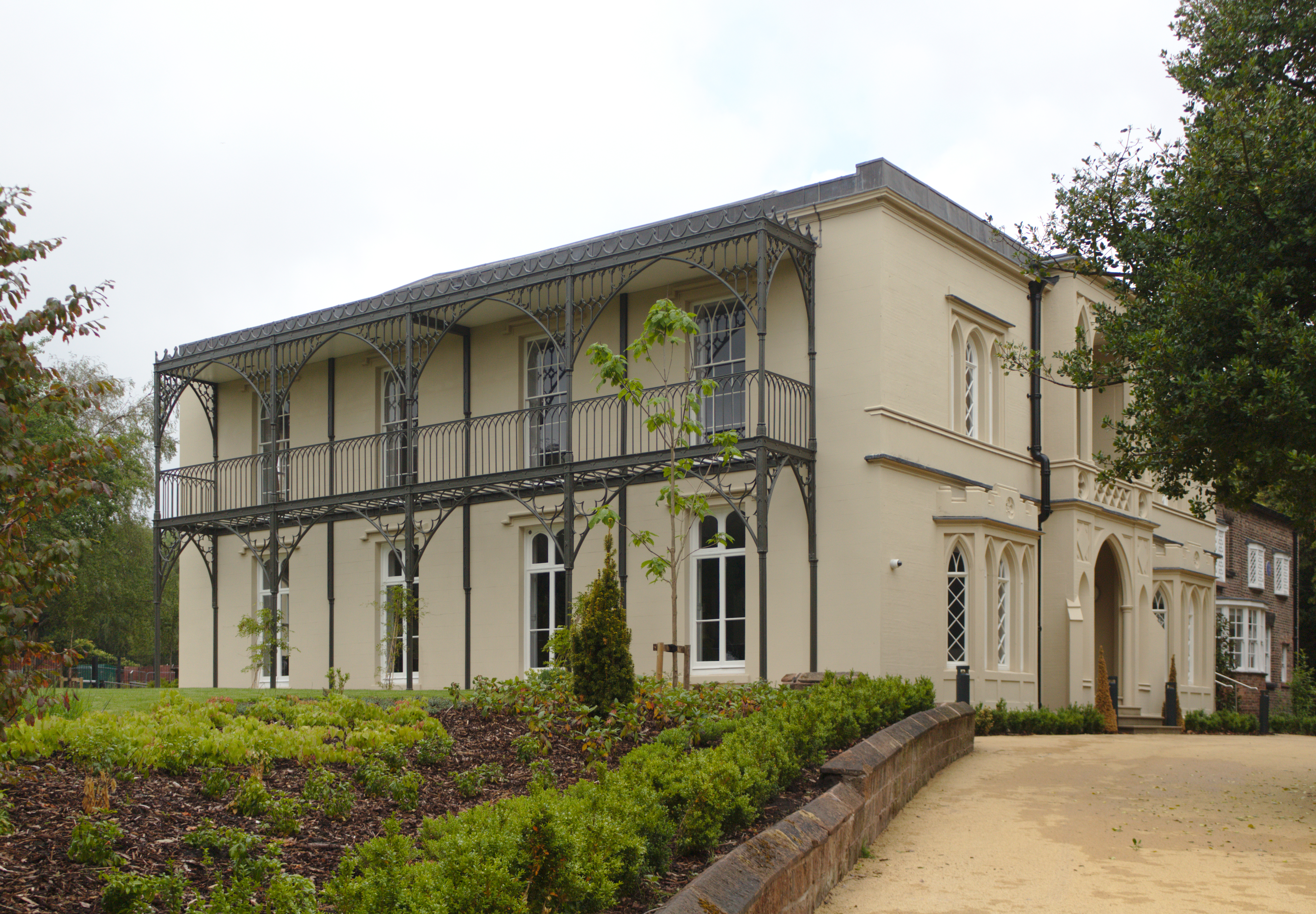
South facade and cast iron veranda

The main facade house consists of three bays, over two stories. There is a central, ground floor portico flanked by two canted, crenelated bay windows. The south facade consists of four bays, covered by a two-storey, cast-iron veranda, installed in the early 19th century. Pollard and Pevsner, believe the ironwork was likely produced at the Coalbrookdale foundry, which at the time was owned by Hannah Rathbone's father. An extension in red sandstone was added in 1868, with a conservatory being built in 1869.

=== Interior ===
The majority of the original interior is extant and is a mixture of Gothic Revival and Neoclassical styles. The principal rooms contain both Gothic Revival and Neoclassical fireplaces and decorative plasterwork. The entrance hall features a plaster vaulted ceiling, with wheel-shaped ceiling bosses.

== Blue Plaque recognition ==
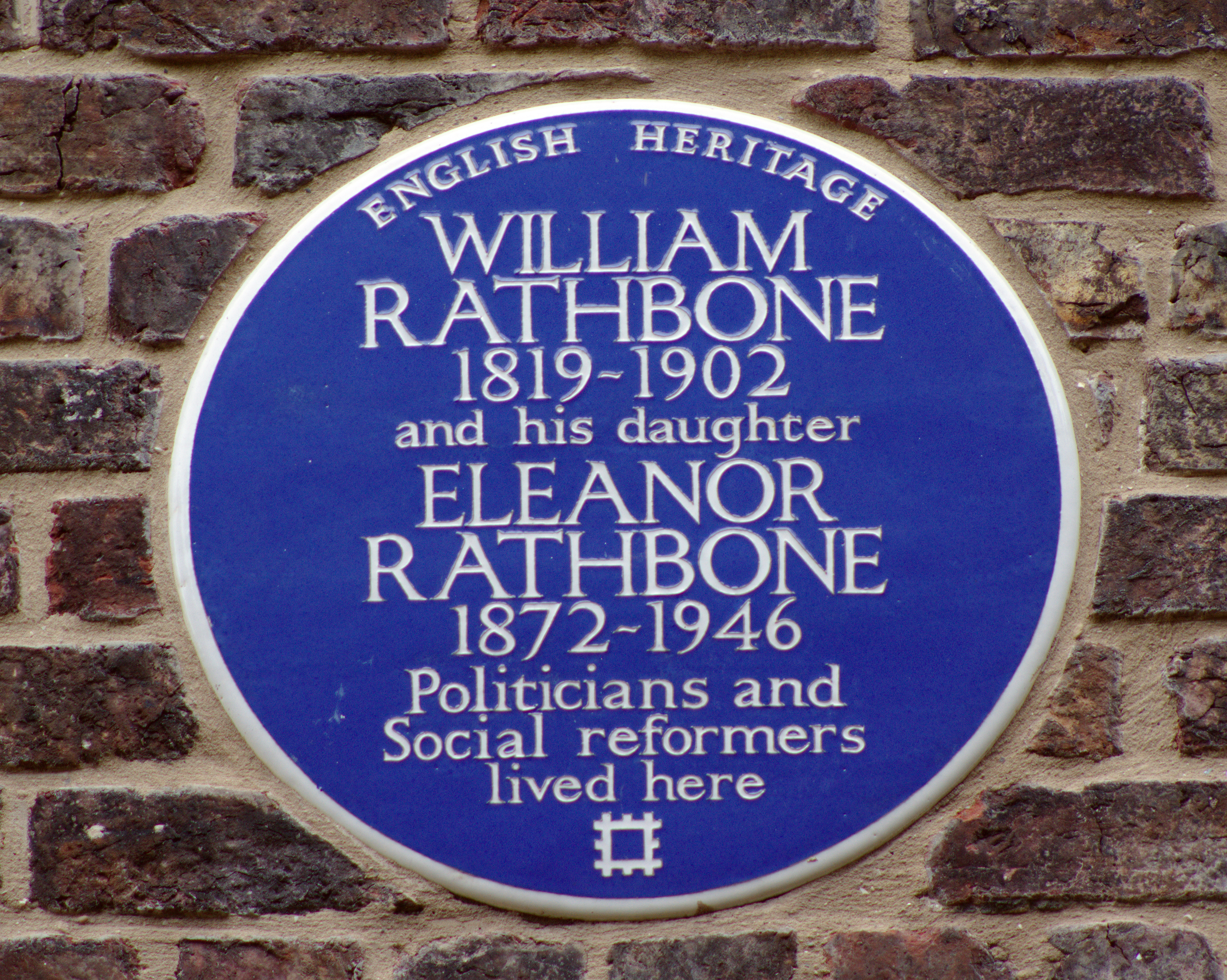
Plaque to William Rathbone and his daughter Eleanor at Greenbank House

The property has been marked by an English Heritage Blue Plaque since 29 July 2001, which honours Eleanor Rathbone (1872–1946), suffragist and pioneer of the state-funded family allowance, and her father, social reformer William Rathbone VI (1819–1902), who created the first system of district nursing. The plaque was unveiled by William Rathbone X in 2001.

== See also ==
- Grade II* listed buildings in Liverpool – Suburbs
