= Rathbone Training =

Rathbone Training was a registered charity in the United Kingdom. It educates and trains young people and adults aged 14+ in its own training centres across England, Scotland and Wales, as well as providing work-based training in the form of apprenticeships and traineeships. Rathbone Training also gives specialist help with English, Maths and ICT.

Rathbone Training was created out of The Rathbone Society, founded by Elfrida Rathbone.

It describes its work as being with "anyone whose needs have not been met by education, or who needs support to overcome their barriers to learning, training or employment". It provides education and training to more than 10,000 people every year.
