= William Rathbone III =

English merchant (1726–1789)

- Born: 1726
- Died: 1789 (aged 62–63)
- Occupation: Merchant

William Rathbone III (1726–1789) was a member of the noted Rathbone family of Liverpool, England.

The eldest son of William Rathbone II, he was a merchant and ship-owner in Liverpool. A devout Quaker, and committed opponent of the slave trade, he married twice, fathering eleven children, including William Rathbone IV.

Rathbone was a member of the literary circle known as the Liverpool Saints with his friend William Roscoe, joining them in the promotion of the Society for the Abolition of the Slave Trade in 1787. Thomas Clarkson noted that Rathbone 'would not allow any article to be sold for the use of a slave-ship, and he always refused those who applied to him for materials for such purpose.'

Despite the family's open opposition to the slave trade, their shipping and commission business 'continued to owe a great deal of its success to trading in American cotton.'
