= William Rathbone (ship) =

At least two vessels have been named William Rathbone:

- William Rathbone (1809 ship) was launched at Liverpool as a West Indiaman. During her career she recaptured a British vessel, and was herself captured by an American privateer, but quickly recaptured by the Royal Navy. Later she traded with Africa, and eventually Calcutta. She burnt at sea in May 1846 when a cargo of jute underwent spontaneous combustion.
- William Rathbone (1849 ship), of 91690/95 tons (bm), and 1,117.78 GRT, was built at Mystic by George Greenman & Co. The barque wrecked on 11 October 1878 some 10–14 miles north of Hillsboro Inlet, Pompano Beach, Florida.
