= Augusta Rathbone =

American painter, etcher and printmaker (1897–1990)

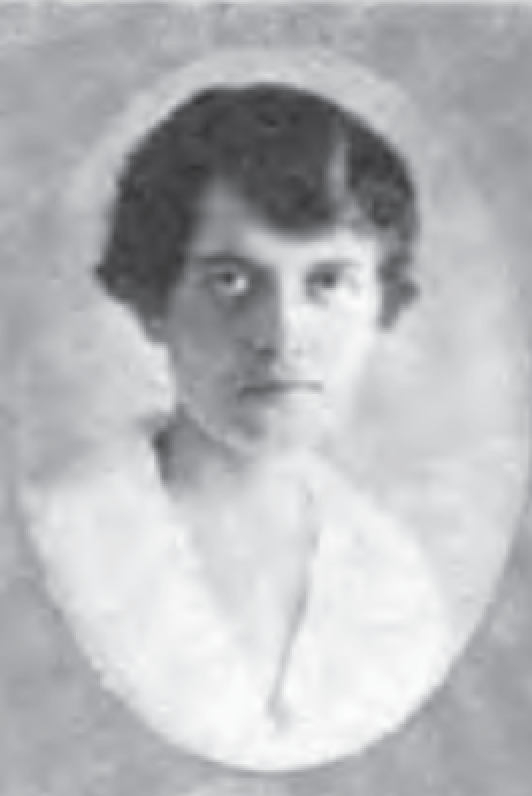
- Augusta Rathbone, 1920
- Born: Augusta Payne Briggs Rathbone; November 30, 1897; Berkeley, California
- Died: March 19, 1990 (aged 92); Palo Alto, California
- Education: University of California, Berkeley
- Occupations: Artist and traveller
- Known for: Etchings, aquatints
- Notable work: Pastels, Etchings, of Cambodia and China, 1928

Augusta Payne Briggs Rathbone (November 30, 1897 – March 19, 1990) was an American painter, etcher and printmaker. She studied at the University of California, Berkeley and in Paris. She depicted people and locations from San Francisco, the Sierra, New York City, the West Coast of Canada, the Canadian Rockies, and France. In 1938, she published a book of aquatints of French Riviera Villages with photographs by Juliet Thompson and text by Virginia Thompson. Her work appeared internationally in group and solo exhibitions, and continues to appear in retrospectives of American printmaking.

== Early life ==
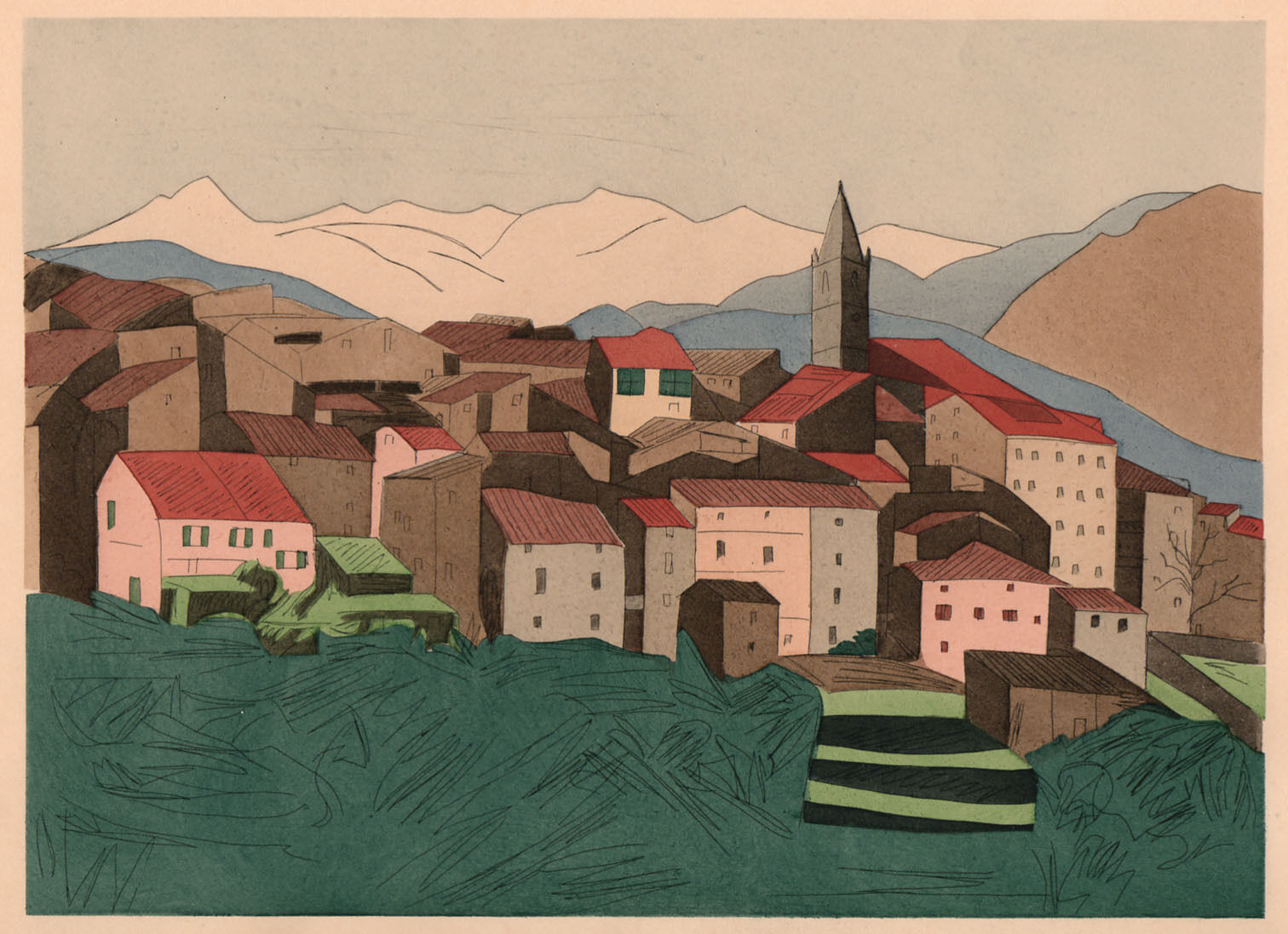
LE BROC, French Riviera Villages aquatint

Augusta Payne Briggs Rathbone was born to Henry Bowen Rathbone and Julia Payne Briggs, in Berkeley, California on December 30, 1897. She was raised by French-speaking aunts and attended Miss Hamlin’s School for Girls and Young Ladies in San Francisco.

== Education ==
Rathbone received a bachelor's degree from the College of Letters and Science at the University of California, Berkeley in 1920, with honors in drawing and art and a minor in French.

In 1921, Rathbone traveled to Paris, where she studied at the Académie de la Grande Chaumière. Her teachers included Lucien Simon and Claudio Castelucho y Diana.

== Career ==
Rathbone spent extended periods of time in France and had a studio at the American University Women's Club in Paris (later Reid Hall).

Rathbone was introduced to printmaking by the American artist Norah Hamilton of Chicago in 1927. Hamilton suggested that etching would be an effective technique for the strong lines of Rathbone's charcoal and gouache drawings.

Initially Rathbone hired Monsieur Alfred Porcabeuf, a Parisian printer, to professionally print her works. Rathbone produced the plates and delivered them to Porcabeuf. Although she discussed the intended printing of the plates with him, she was not present during the actual printing process. Porcabeuf did not always follow Rathbone's desired interpretation in choosing paper and colors for the aquatints.

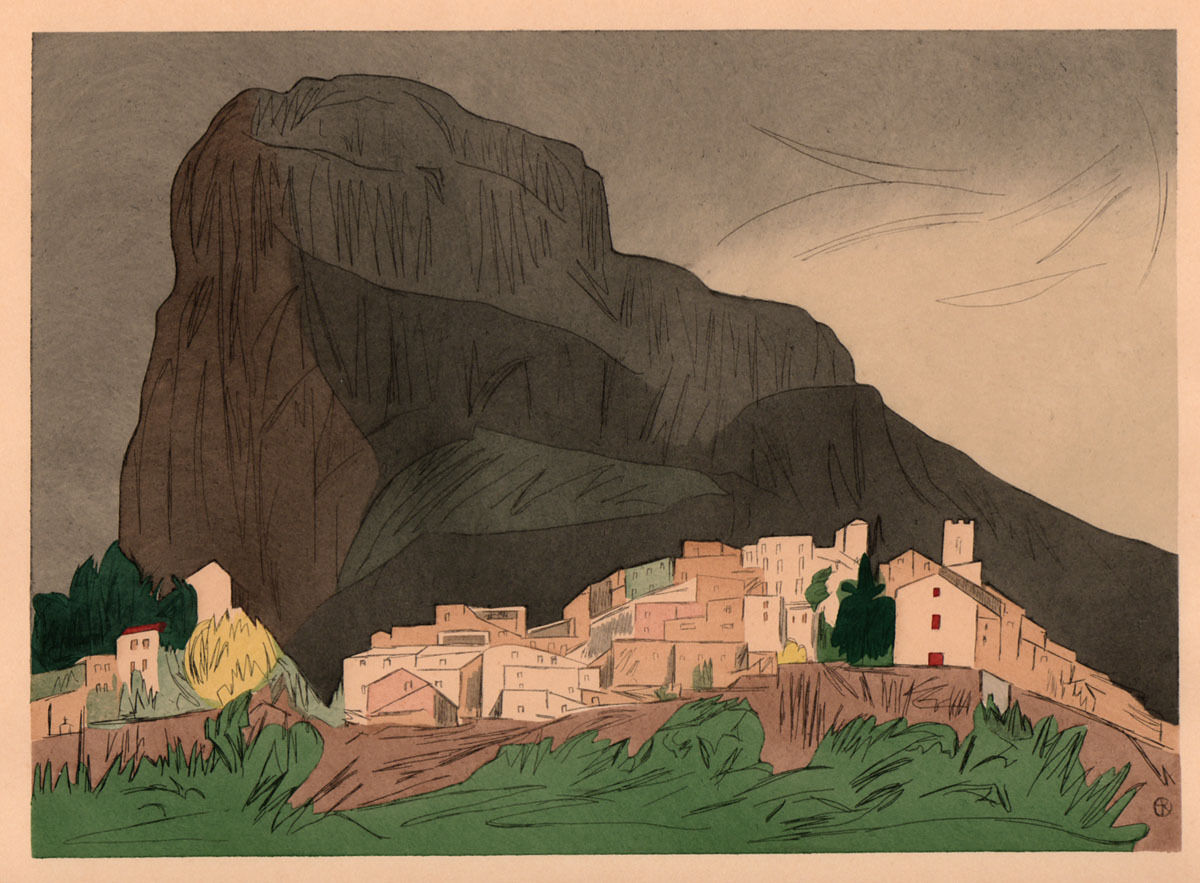
St. JEANNET, French Riviera Villages aquatint

By the early 1930s Rathbone had developed a series of works based on the San Francisco Bay area, and another focusing on the Lake Tahoe-Sierra Nevada areas. In the mid 1930s Rathbone created a series of etchings and colored aquatints based on her travels in the towns and villages of Brittany and the French Riviera. She collaborated with Juliet and Virginia Thompson, resulting in the book French Riviera Villages (1938). Juliet Thompson provided photographs, while Virginia Thompson wrote the text. Mitchell Kennerley published the book, producing twelve of Rathbone’s color aquatints in pochoir.

As conditions worsened in Europe prior to World War II, Rathbone returned to San Francisco, bringing her printing plates with her. She began to do her own printing, creating new versions of previously-produced plates using her own choices of impressions, colors and papers. In some cases, there are striking differences between the 1930s French and 1940s American prints from the same plate.

When she returned to Paris following the war, Rathbone discovered that M. Porcabeouf's printing business had been sold. Rathbone was not happy with his successor, and continued to produce her own prints.

== Exhibitions ==
Rathbone exhibited at the Salon de Nationale, in Paris in 1930 and 1931 and at the Salon d'Automne in 1937. Her work appeared at the Brooklyn Museum in 1933 in the exhibition American Color Prints, and in 1934 in an exhibition of etchings. She was part of the 15th Annual Exhibition of the San Francisco Society of Women Artists, held at the San Francisco Museum of Art in 1940.

Her first solo exhibition took place in 1930 at the Elder Gallery in San Francisco. She also had a solo show of color etchings in 1936 at the Stendahl Galleries in Los Angeles; and a show of aquatints in 1939 at Moyer Galleries in Hartford, Connecticut. She had a solo show at the San Francisco Museum of Art in 1940.

In the 1950s, she and Elizabeth Ginno held two-person exhibitions at the California State Library in Sacramento, California in 1952, and at the de Young Museum in San Francisco in 1954.

The exhibition of color aquatints by Augusta Rathbone, also at the de Young, is one of the most delightful print shows of the year. This artist really knows how to use color in graphic media. She employs it for modeling more than for local description, and this frees her line to crackle, dance, caricature or describe arabesques as the pictorial situation demands. The pictorial situation ranges from San Francisco through the Sierra to New York, Paris and old towns on the French Riviera, all set forth with the utmost deftness, point, character and integrity.--Alfred Frankenstein, art critic for the San Francisco Chronicle, 1954

Rathbone’s work has been included in retrospective shows of American printmaking. Rathbone was part of the book and exhibition A Spectrum of Innovation: Color in American Printmaking, 1890-1960 (1990), curated by David Acton for the Worcester Art Museum. Her work was also included in Country Views, City Visions (1996) at the Jane Voorhees Zimmerli Art Museum of Rutgers University, which described her as "a modernist on her way to abstraction".

She was a member of the San Francisco Women Artists, the California Society of Etchers, the American Artists Professional League and the National Arts Club.

Augusta Rathbone died on March 19, 1990, in Palo Alto, California.
