= Elfrida Rathbone =

British educationist

Elfrida Rathbone (1871–1940) was an English educationist and a member of the noted Rathbone family of Liverpool and the cousin of Eleanor Rathbone, who was an MP and campaigned for children's rights.

== Career ==
She was born in Liverpool in July 1871 and was one of 11 children. Her brothers and sisters were also involved in charity during their lives.

In 1916 she began to teach in a special school in the King's Cross area of London, for children who were not thought to be capable of learning. She worked with another cousin, Lillian Gregg, who had set up a special kindergarten for young children considered to be "uneducated" and "mentally defective". She wanted to demonstrate that these children could learn and progress if they received an appropriate teaching.

In the 1900s, Lillian Gregg had been challenged to the damaging effect of judgmental attitudes implicit in "labelling" people. She adopted a young child with a learning difficulty whom she taught to read and write and function normally. Later she and the child died in the influenza epidemic in 1918.

Elfrida continued their work and established an "Occupation Centre" in Kings Cross in 1919. And in 1922, it was changed into Central Association for Mental Health, which was a well established charity. She always upheld the right of children to be educated at school. In 1923 she started a "Girls Club" for children, who left kindergarten and later she founded a "Married Girls" class with a crèche. In 1930, she developed a befriending scheme for children with learning difficulties who were confined to Public Assistance Homes.

The organisation she founded now exists as The Elfrida Society, a charity in Islington, London, supporting adults and young people with learning difficulties.

Her work informed the formation of the Rathbone Society in 1969, now incorporated into the Rathbone Training charity.

== Sources ==
- Rathbone Charity history
- The Elfrida Society
- Who Was Elfrida?
- Who is Elfrida Rathbone?
