= Richard Rathbone =

Merchant of Liverpool, England

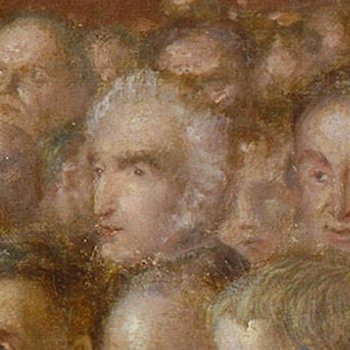
- Rathbone in 1840 in the crowd at the conference
- Born: 2 December 1788
- Died: 10 November 1860 (aged 71)
- Occupation: Merchant
- Known for: Abolitionism
- Spouse: Hannah Reynolds (m. 1817)
- Children: Hannah, Richard, Margaret, William, Basil, and Emily
- Parent(s): William Rathbone; Hannah Reynolds

Richard Rathbone (2 December 1788 – 10 November 1860) was a merchant and member of the noted Rathbone family of Liverpool in England.

== Life ==
Rathbone was the second son of William Rathbone IV. Richard was a commission merchant, setting up in partnership with his brother, William Rathbone V in 1809.

On 8 April 1817, Rathbone married his half-cousin, the illustrator and writer, Hannah Mary, daughter of Joseph Reynolds of Ketley, Shropshire, and granddaughter of Richard Reynolds. Richard devoted a lot of his time to the family business, which concerned his wife.

He retired in 1835. As a committed opponent of the slave trade, he published in 1836 Letter to the President of the Liverpool Anti-Slavery Society.

Rathbone attended the 1840 anti-slavery convention in London and was included in the painting which is now in the National Portrait Gallery in London.

Rathbone and his wife had six children:

- Hannah Mary (1818–1853)
- Richard Reynolds (1820–1898)
- Margaret (b. 1821 later Dixon)
- William Benson (1826–1892)
- Basil (1824–1853)
- Emily (1838–1907, later Greg)
