= Hannah Mary Rathbone =

English novelist and poet (1798–1878)

Hannah Mary Rathbone (5 July 1798, in Shropshire – 26 March 1878, in Liverpool) was an English writer and the author of The Diary of Lady Willoughby.

== Life ==
Reynolds was born in 1798. Her parents were Joseph Reynolds and Deborah (born Dearman). She was born near Wellington in Shropshire. Her grandfather was the ironmaster Richard Reynolds (1735–1816). In 1817 Hannah Mary Reynolds married her half-cousin, Richard Rathbone, a son of William Rathbone IV, By him she had six children.

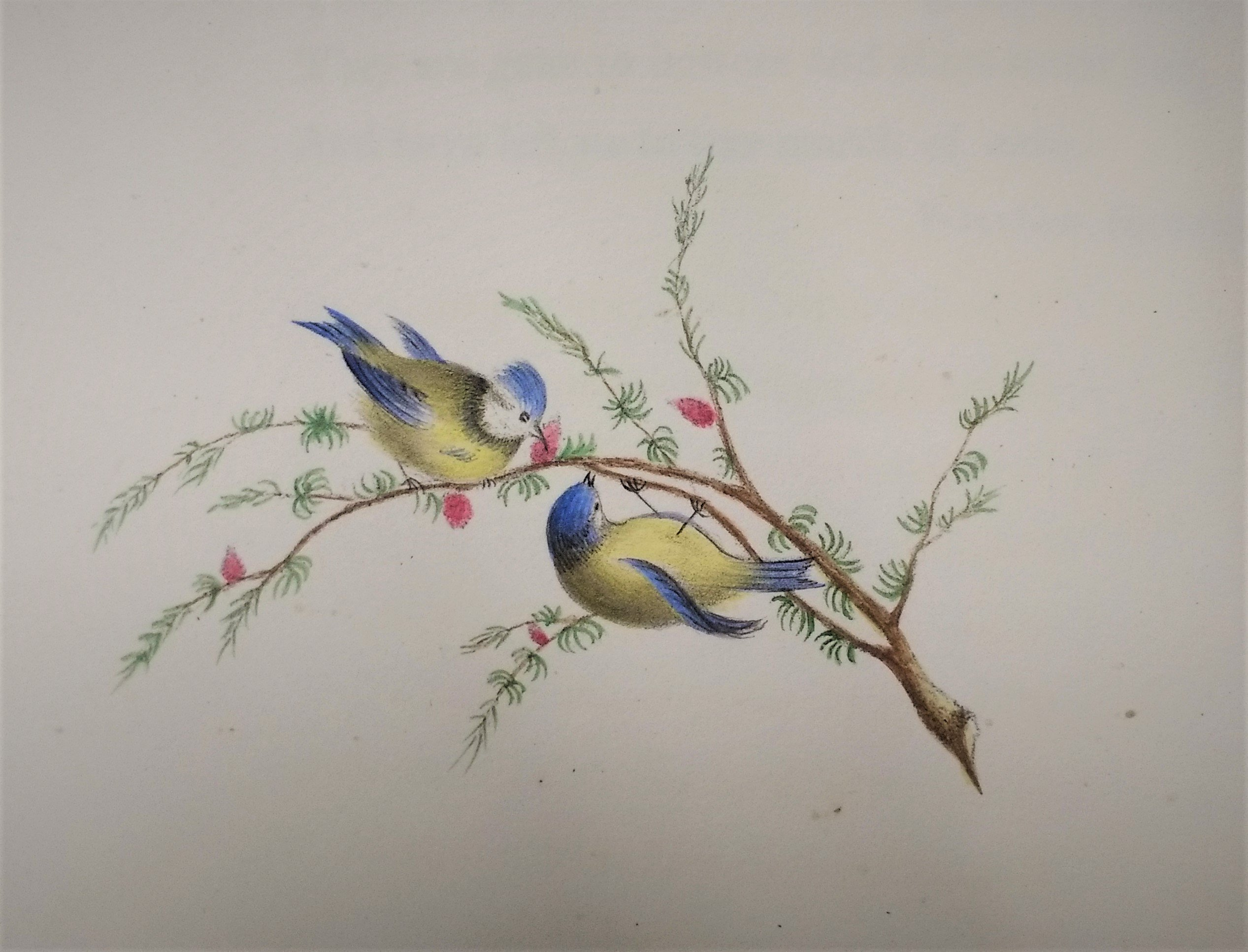
Illustration from "The Poetry of Birds" (1832) by Hannah Mary Rathbone

Mrs. Rathbone's health was delicate. She applied her early training in drawing and painting to minute work, including illuminating on vellum from old manuscript designs. She contributed twenty illustrations of small birds to The Poetry of Birds published in Liverpool in 1832. She also published a selection of pen-and-ink drawings from Pinelli's etchings of Italian peasantry. Later in life she took to landscape in water-colours. In 1840 she made her first modest literary venture by publishing a collection of pieces in verse entitled Childhood, some of which were from her own hand; and in 1841 there followed Selections from the Poets.

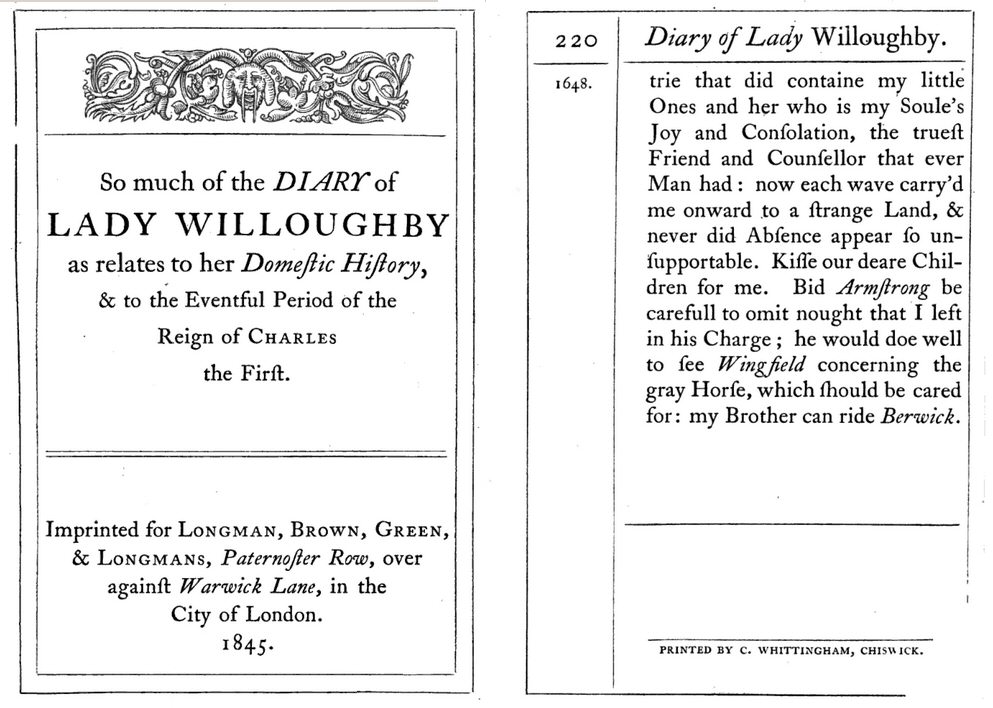
Title page and last page of The Diary of Lady Willoughby, 1845, printed to resemble a book of the period of Charles I by Charles Whittingham's Chiswick Press

So much of the Diary of Lady Willoughby, as relates to her Domestic History, and to the Eventful Period of the Reign of Charles the First, the work which gained celebrity for its author, was published anonymously in 1844; a second and a third edition following in 1845, and a New York edition in the same year. Influenced by her father's tastes, she had read many histories and memoirs of the Civil war and adjacent periods, and her publisher (Thomas Longman) took great pride in bringing out the Diary as an exact reproduction of a book of the seventeenth century, in which it was supposed to be written. He had a new font specially cast at the Chiswick Press. In some quarters the Diary was at once accepted as genuine; in others, author and publisher incurred indignant reproof as having conspired in an intentional deception. Readers speculated on the identity of the writer; and Robert Southey, Lord John Manners, and Mr. John Murray were in turn suggested. In the third edition of 1873 the publishers and author inserted a joint note avowing the real character of the book reading To The Reader, The style and printing and general appearance of this volume have been adopted by the publishers in accordance with the design of the Author, who in this work 'personates' (sic) a lady of the seventeenth century.

In 1847 Mrs. Rathbone issued a sequel under the title Some further Portions of the Diary of Lady Willoughby which do relate to her Domestic History and to the Events of the latter Years of the Reign of King Charles the First, the Protectorate, and the Revolution. The two parts were in 1848 republished together. The general excellence of Mrs. Rathbone's workmanship, when she is at her best, becomes most clearly evident if Lady Willoughby's Diary is compared with Anne Manning's Life of Mary Powell (1850), which manifestly owed its origin to the success of the earlier work, but is altogether inferior to it.

In 1852 Mrs. Rathbone published the Letters of Richard Reynolds, her paternal grandfather. In 1858 she printed a short series of poems called The Strawberry Girl, with other Thoughts and Fancies in Verse. She died at Liverpool on 26 March 1878.
