= Tim Rathbone =

British politician (1933–2002)

Member of Parliament for Lewes
- In office 28 February 1974 – 8 April 1997
- Preceded by: Tufton Beamish
- Succeeded by: Norman Baker

Personal details
- Born: John Rankin Rathbone; 17 March 1933 London, England
- Died: 12 July 2002 (aged 69) London, England
- Resting place: St Peter's Church, Lowick, Northamptonshire
- Party: Conservative (until 1998)
- Spouses: Margarita Sanchez y Sanchez (m. 1960; div. 1981) Susan Stopford Sackville (m. 1982)
- Children: 3
- Education: Christ Church, Oxford; Harvard Business School
- Profession: Businessman

John Rankin "Tim" Rathbone (17 March 1933 – 12 July 2002) was a British businessman and Conservative politician who was the Member of Parliament (MP) for the seat of Lewes between 1974 and 1997.

== Background ==
Rathbone was born in London on 17 March 1933, the son of a Conservative MP also called John Rankin Rathbone, who represented Bodmin from 1935 until his death as a fighter pilot for the Royal Air Force in the Battle of Britain in 1940. Rathbone's mother, American-born Beatrice Wright, then succeeded him as MP at the by-election, serving until 1945. Tim Rathbone was a great-nephew of Eleanor Rathbone, who had been an independent MP for the Combined English Universities between 1929 and 1946, and a staunch women's rights campaigner. He was a great-grandson of William Rathbone, a Liberal MP for Liverpool and later Carnarvonshire.

Rathbone was educated at Eton College and Christ Church, Oxford, where he read Philosophy, Politics and Economics. After a spell as merchant banker, he emigrated in 1958 to the United States where he attended Harvard Business School and worked for the New York advertising firm Ogilvy and Mather, before returning to the UK in 1966. In 1960, he married Margarita Sanchez y Sanchez, a Cuban, with whom he had three children: John-Paul, Michael and Cristina.

== Politics ==
Upon his return to Britain, Rathbone was recruited by party chairman Edward du Cann to work for the Conservatives as Chief Publicity Officer. He was relatively ineffectual in this position, partly because his brief overlapped with other Conservative staffers. Rathbone moved to the Charles Barker Group, a leading advertising agency in 1968, where he remained for 18 years. He was appointed to a string of directorships within the group and was managing director of Ayer Barker until 1974.

In 1973, he was selected to fight the safe Conservative seat of Lewes, which he duly won in the February 1974 election. Upon entering Parliament, it was clear that Rathbone had a reforming zeal about him, and pushed for declaration of Members' interests, electoral reform and devolution. In 1981, he divorced his first wife and the following year married Susan Stopford Sackville.

Rathbone was also a staunch critic of apartheid: On a visit to Rhodesia, he proposed ousting Ian Smith and holding transitional elections for a majority black government. In 1986, he invited Oliver Tambo, a prominent member of the South African opposition to address Conservative MPs.

When the Conservatives entered government in 1979, Rathbone was appointed as Parliamentary Private Secretary to Gerald Vaughan, the Minister for Health, a position he held until 1982. He later served as PPS to other Ministers. He did not achieve high ministerial office however because of his rebelling tendencies, and was perceived as a "wet". The Independent described him as "a Tory of the lightest imaginable shade of liberal blue". He opposed the Bill that scrapped the Greater London Council and other metropolitan authorities in 1984, and also the poll tax. He also became Chairman of the Parliamentary Committee on Drug Misuse. Rathbone was a relation of, and godfather to, the future Conservative leader David Cameron, and once employed a university-aged Cameron as a researcher.

== Later years ==
After losing his seat to the Liberal Democrats in the 1997 general election, Rathbone became chairman of Sponsorship Consultancy Ltd. In August 1998, was expelled from the Conservative Party by William Hague for his support of the breakaway Pro-Euro Conservative Party. He died from cancer in London on 12 July 2002, at the age of 69. He is buried in the churchyard of St Peter's Church, Lowick, Northamptonshire.

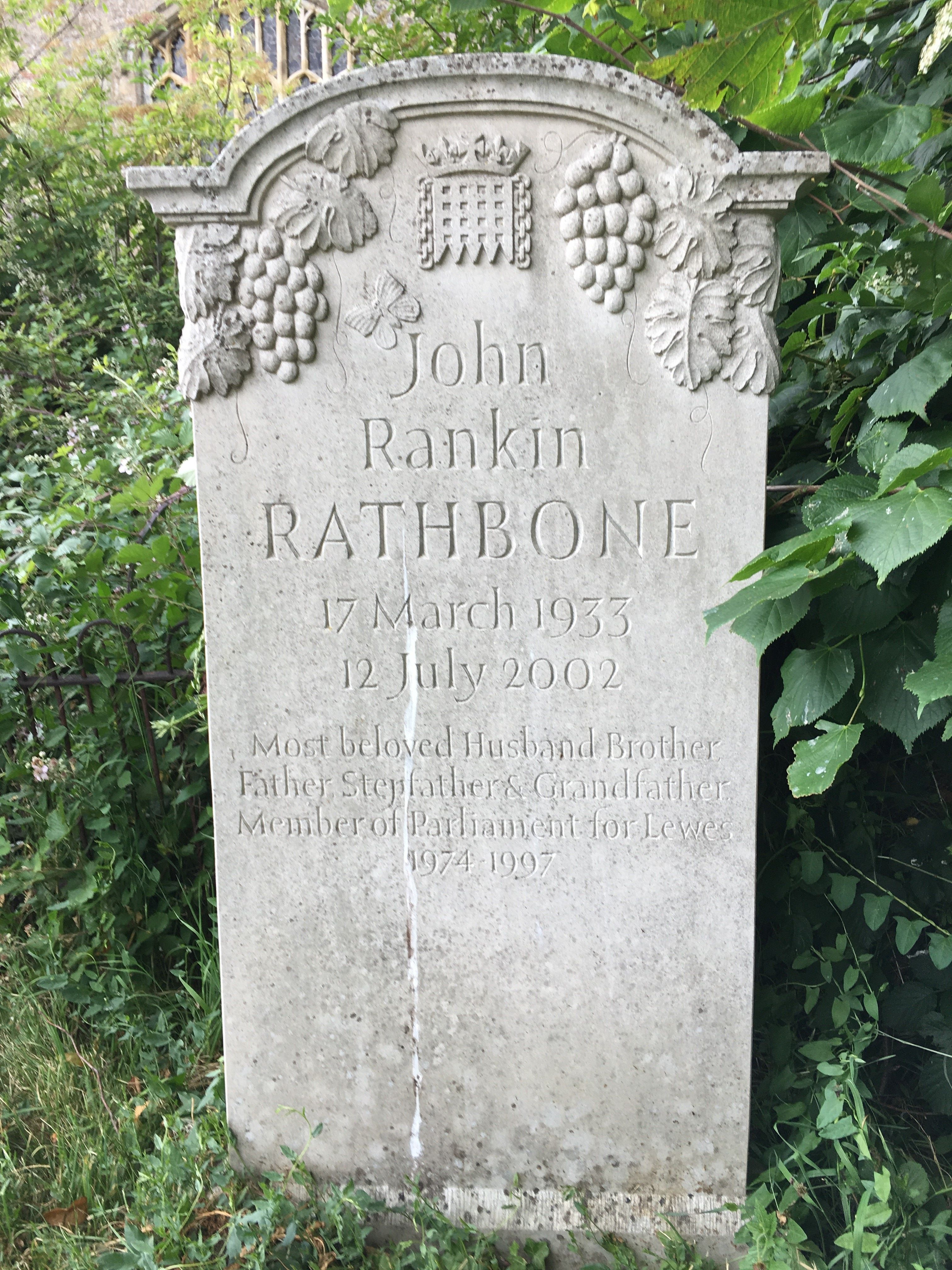
The grave of Tim Rathbone in the churchyard of St Peter's Church, Lowick, Northamptonshire

Parliament of the United Kingdom
Preceded by Tufton Beamish	Member of Parliament for Lewes; Feb 1974–1997	Succeeded by Norman Baker
