= William Rathbone II =

British businessman (1696–1746)

William Rathbone II (22 May 1696 – 1746) was a member of the noted Rathbone family of Liverpool, England.

William Rathbone was the son of a sawyer who lived in Gawsworth, Cheshire, and shared his name. Born on 22 May 1696, William Rathbone II took up his father's occupation as a sawyer and by 1730 was based in Liverpool, Lancashire, where he probably established a timber business. He joined the Society of Friends in 1731.

In 1722 he married Sarah Hyde with whom he had at least two sons, William Rathbone III and Joseph. He died in 1746.

It was probably through business connections that William's son, Joseph, married Mary Darby, a sister of Abraham Darby II. The Darbys had opened a warehouse for export purposes in Liverpool and then began manufacturing there at the Phoenix Foundry. William had been a customer of the Darbys' Coalbrookdale-based iron foundry and eventually provided loans to them. Joseph became manager of the Liverpool foundry in 1771 and in 1784 married Mary. On his death in 1790 it seems that the Rathbone interest in the business at Coalbrookdale was considerable.
