= William Rathbone V =

English merchant and politician

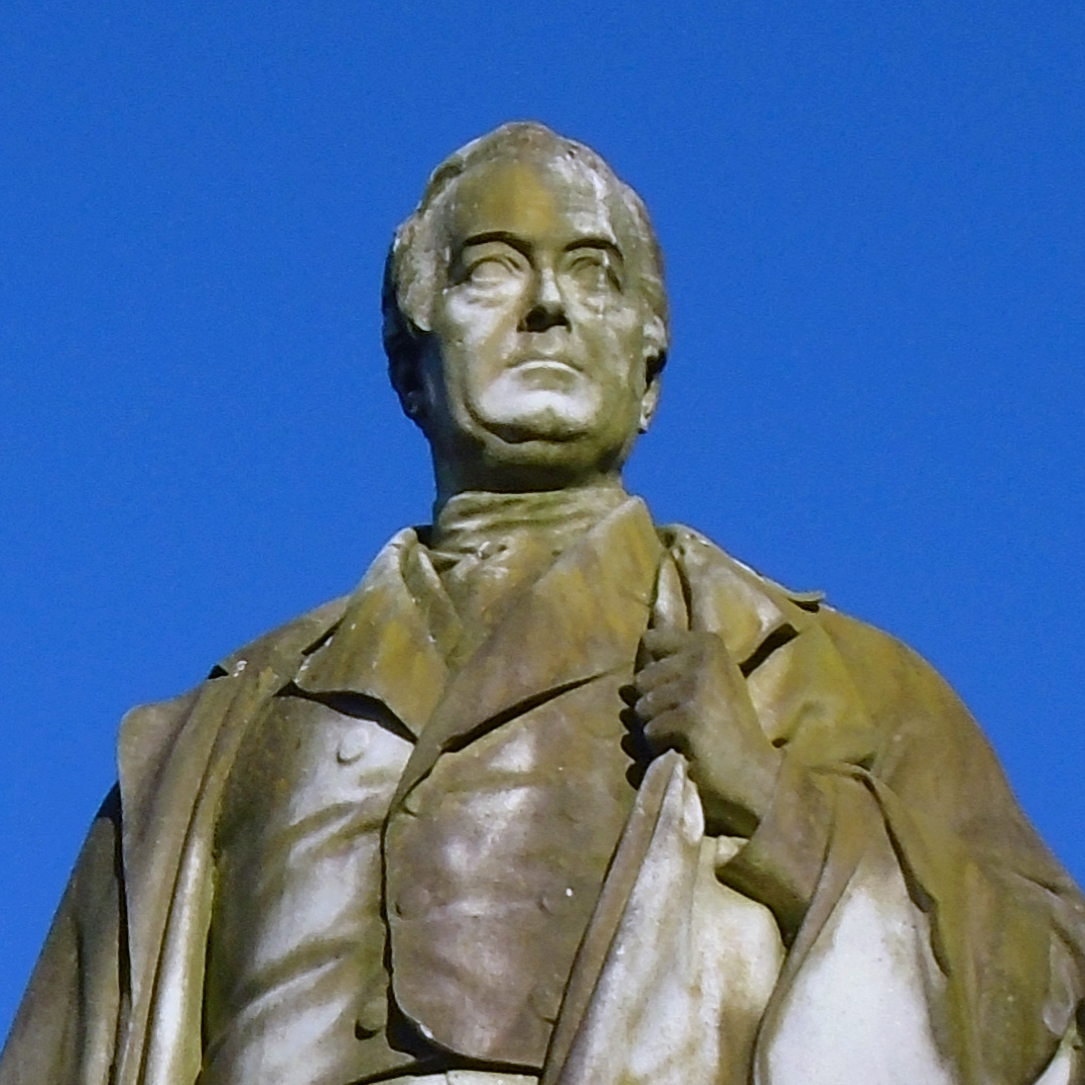
- Rathbone's statue in Sefton Park
- Born: 17 June 1787
- Died: 1 February 1868 (aged 80); Liverpool, England
- Occupations: Merchant, politician
- Parents: William Rathbone IV; Hannah Mary (née Reynolds)

William Rathbone V (17 June 1787 – 1 February 1868) was an English merchant and politician, serving as Lord Mayor of Liverpool.

== Life ==
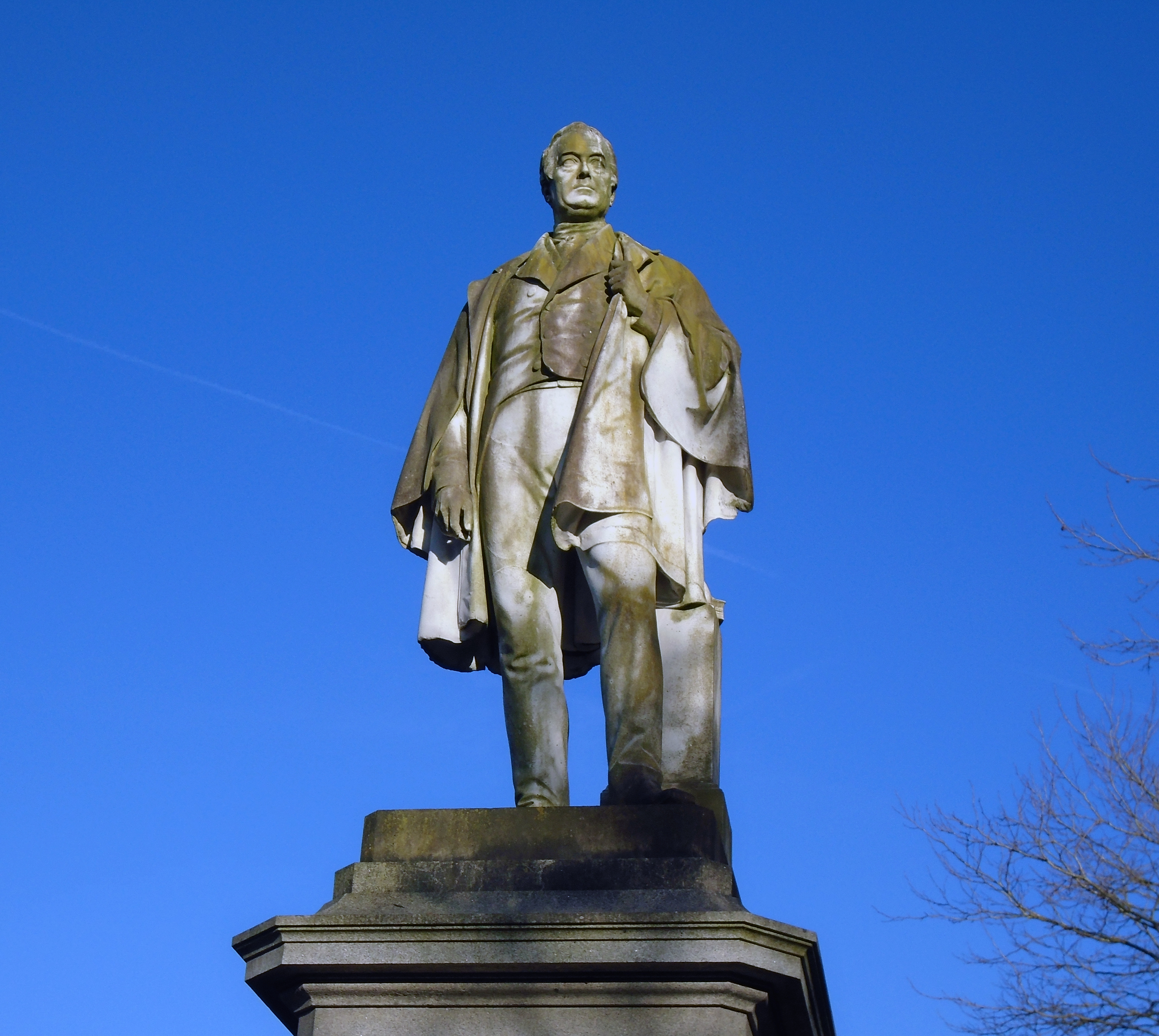
Statue in Sefton Park

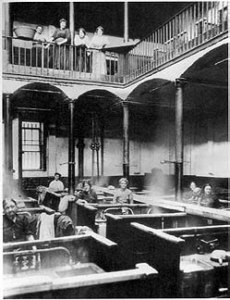
Frederick Street wash house

William Rathbone was a Quaker until he was disowned by the Society of Friends in 1820. He then joined the Unitarian Congregation at the Renshaw Street Chapel. The Rathbones were prominent members of Liverpool society and were known as merchants and shipowners.

The notability and prosperity of the Rathbone family of Liverpool were tied to the growth of that city as a major Atlantic trading port. William was the eldest son of William Rathbone IV and Hannah Mary (née Reynolds). He was born in 1787, although the statue of him in Sefton Park erroneously gives his birth year as 1788. William went into partnership as a merchant with his brother Richard.

William Rathbone was elected a Reformer (Liberal) councillor for the Pitt Street ward in Liverpool in the first ever Council election in 1835, subsequently re-elected in 1837, for the Vauxhall ward in 1845, Lord Mayor of Liverpool in 1837, and fought for social reforms. He supported Kitty Wilkinson in establishing wash-houses and public baths following the 1832 cholera epidemic, was an active supporter of the Municipal Reform Act 1835, and was responsible for the distribution of New England Relief funds during the Irish famine of 1846–1847 (see British Relief Association). Rathbone died on 1 February 1868 at Greenbank House, with over 1,000 mourners attending his funeral.

== Family ==
Rathbone married Elizabeth (1790–1882), daughter of Samuel Greg of Quarry Bank Mill, Cheshire and Hannah (née Lightbody) in 1812. Their children included:

- Elizabeth who married John Paget
- Hannah Mary who married John Hamilton Thom
- William Rathbone VI
- Samuel Greg
- Philip Henry (1828–95).

He was the great-grandfather of the actor Basil Rathbone.
