= William Rathbone IV =

English ship-owner and merchant

William Rathbone IV (10 June 1757 – 11 February 1809) was an English ship-owner and merchant involved in the organisation of American trade with Liverpool, England. He was a political radical, supporting the abolition of the slave trade and universal suffrage. He was a member of the noted Rathbone family.

== Slave trade ==
Rathbone was a committed opponent to slavery and a founding member of the Liverpool Committee for the Abolition of the Slave Trade created in 1788, a society originating in London the year before. As a Liverpool merchant, he benefited from the sale of timber for use in slave ships and imported goods, such as cotton, made with slave labour.

== Political views ==
Rathbone was considered a political radical because he supported the abolition of slavery, universal suffrage, free trade, and he was opposed to the 1793 war with France. He was called the "hoary traitor".

Originally a member of the Society of Friends, he felt compelled to write the Narrative of Events in Ireland among the Quakers in 1786 in protest against religious intolerance in the Society, for which he was disowned from the Quakers in 1805. He would never join another religious body, though he occasionally worshipped with local Unitarian congregations.

== Personal life ==
In 1788, Rathbone took a lease on the house and estate of Greenbank, then part of the Toxteth Park property, to serve as a country retreat for his young family, and purchased the freehold of the house in 1809.

Rathbone died on 11 February 1809 and was buried at Liverpool Friends' Burial Ground.

=== Family ===
Rathbone married Hannah Mary, (1761–1839) daughter of Richard Reynolds of Bristol and Hannah (née Darby) at the Friends Meeting House, Shrewsbury. They had eight children:

- William Rathbone V (1787–1868)
- Richard Rathbone (1788–1860)
- Hannah Mary (1791–1865)
- Joseph (1793–1794)
- Theophilus (1795–1798)
- Theodore Woolman (1798–1863)
- Benson (1800–1834)
- Basil (1802–1804)
