= John Rathbone =

British politician (1910–1940)

Flight Lieutenant (Pilot) John Rankin Rathbone MP
- Born: 5 February 1910
- Died: 10 December 1940 (aged 30); Antwerp, Belgium
- Burial place: Schoonselhof Cemetery, Antwerpen, Belgium (grave ref. II. H. 30.)
- Relatives: Eleanor Rathbone MP (Aunt); William Rathbone MP (Grandfather); Beatrice Rathbone (Spouse), Tim Rathbone MP (Son)
- Military career
- Allegiance: United Kingdom
- Branch: Royal Air Force Volunteer Reserve
- Rank: Flight Lieutenant (Pilot)
- Service number: 72451

John Rankin Rathbone (5 February 1910 – 10 December 1940) was a British Conservative Party politician.

== Early life ==
He was born in 1910 to William Rathbone, a marine architect, and Agnes Dorothea Rankin.

=== Education ===
For his education, Rathbone attended West Downs and Eton College before attending Christ Church, Oxford.

Whilst up at Oxford, he met an American student, Beatrice Frederika Clough, who had come to study at the university. The couple married in 1932 and had two children, a son, John Rankin Rathbone (known as Tim) and a daughter, Pauline Rathbone.

== Political career ==
From the 1935 general election until his death, he was Member of Parliament (MP) for the Bodmin constituency in Cornwall. After his death, his American-born wife Beatrice was elected unopposed to succeed him as MP. The family lived in the constituency at Elmsleigh.

== Foreign travel ==
=== United States ===
John and Beatrice travelled to the United States in the summer of 1934, sailing back to Britain aboard the RMS Aquitania in October. They returned to America in 1936, again sailing back to Britain in the October, this time aboard the RMS Queen Mary.

=== Germany ===
Rathbone travelled as part of a parliamentary delegation, accompanied by Beatrice, to Nazi Germany. A fluent German speaker, he was appalled at what he saw in the country as he participated in the work of the delegation.

He was a qualified pilot, learning to fly with the Old Etonian Flying Club and getting his Avro Club membership on 19 May 1938. Upon returning from Germany, Rathbone called a meeting in his constituency to announce that he was joining the Royal Air Force Volunteer Reserve.

== Second World War ==
He served as Parliamentary Secretary to the Ministry of Supply from July to September 1939, when World War II broke out. A flight lieutenant and fighter pilot with the Royal Air Force, he was killed shortly after the Battle of Britain, on 10 September 1940. He was buried at Schoonselhof cemetery, Antwerp, Belgium.

In his obituary The Times observed:

No one could possibly suggest that John Rathbone was a man of war. He hated it. His readiness to serve his country and before war came to prepare himself is typical of his high sense of duty; and the example he set among those with whom he came in contact remains a truly noble inspiration.

— G. S. H., The Times – 4 January 1941

== Family members ==
Rathbone was the nephew of Eleanor Rathbone, who had been an independent MP for the Combined English Universities between 1929 and 1946, and a staunch women's rights campaigner. He was a grandson of William Rathbone, Liberal MP for Liverpool and later Carnarvonshire.

His son, also called John Rankin Rathbone, but known as Tim Rathbone, was the Conservative MP for Lewes from 1974 to 1997.

His younger brother, Henry Stephen Nicholas Rathbone, served as a captain in the Scots Guards and was killed at Monte Cassino on 9 November 1943.

Parliament of the United Kingdom
Preceded by Isaac Foot	Member of Parliament for Bodmin; 1935–1940	Succeeded by Beatrice Rathbone
