= David Copperfield (disambiguation) =

David Copperfield is a novel by Charles Dickens.

David Copperfield may also refer to:

- David Copperfield (character), the title character of the novel
- David Copperfield (illusionist) (born 1956), American illusionist and stage magician
- David Copperfield (comedian) (born 1947), British comedian and musician
- PC David Copperfield, British police officer and author

== Arts and entertainment ==
=== Film ===
- David Copperfield (1911 film), a film by Theodore Marston
- David Copperfield (1913 film), a film by Thomas Bentley
- David Copperfield (1922 film), a film by A. W. Sandberg
- David Copperfield (1935 film), a film by George Cukor
- David Copperfield (1969 film), a film by Delbert Mann
- David Copperfield (1993 film), an animated made-for-television film
- David Copperfield (1999 film), a TV film by Simon Curtis
- David Copperfield (2000 film), a made-for-television film by Peter Medak
- The Personal History of David Copperfield, a 2019 film chronicling the life of the novel's character

=== Television ===
- David Copperfield (1956 serial), a TV serial starring Robert Hardy
- David Copperfield (1966 serial), a TV serial starring Ian McKellen
- David Copperfield (1974 serial), a BBC TV serial that has aired on PBS
- David Copperfield (1986 serial), a BBC TV serial with Simon Callow
