= David Copperfield (1913 film) =

1913 British film by Thomas Bentley

- Still from David Copperfield (1913)
- Directed by: Thomas Bentley
- Written by: Thomas Bentley
- Based on: David Copperfield; 1850 novel by Charles Dickens
- Produced by: Cecil Hepworth
- Starring: Alma Taylor; Reginald Sheffield
- Production company: Hepworth Picture Plays
- Distributed by: Walturdaw
- Release dates: August 1913 (UK); 1 December 1913 (US)
- Running time: 67 minutes
- Country: United Kingdom
- Languages: Silent; English intertitles

David Copperfield is a 1913 British black-and-white silent film based on the 1850 novel David Copperfield by Charles Dickens. It is the second-oldest known film adaptation of the novel. Running six reels, it is significant as a very early British feature film at a moment when the world film industry was beginning its move away from traditional short films towards longer and more ambitious works.

The film was made by the Hepworth Manufacturing Corporation, was produced by Cecil Hepworth and was written and directed by Thomas Bentley. In the United Kingdom it was released in August 1913, and in the United States it was released on 1 December 1913. It ran at 67 minutes on seven reels.

A review of the film in The Dickensian said:

"It occupies close upon two hours to exhibit and is divided into six parts, telling the story of David's life from Blunderstone to his happy union with Agnes. Obviously the part of David is enacted by three different actors, Master Eric Desmond, Mr Len Bethel and Mr Kenneth Ware. The first-named being one of the cleverest child actors we have seen. We have no space to speak of all the characters presented. Each and all of them were Dickens' creations to the life and not mere exaggerations as is often the case.

The film not only includes all of the most prominent characters and all the necessary incidents of the book to make the story intelligible to the lay reader, but they have been enacted in the actual places in which the novelist laid them."

== Cast ==
- Reginald Sheffield (billed as Eric Desmond) as David Copperfield as a boy
  - Len Bethel as David Copperfield as a youth
  - Kenneth Ware as David Copperfield as a man
- Alma Taylor as Dora Spenlow
- H. Collins as Wilkins Micawber
- Jack Hulcup as Uriah Heep
- Edna May as Em'ly as a child
  - Amy Verity as Em'ly as a woman
- Jamie Darling as Daniel Peggotty
- Cecil Mannering as James Steerforth
- Ella Fineberg as Agnes Wickfield
- Miss Harcourt as Betsey Trotwood
- Miss West as Emma Micawber
- Vida Varrell as Clara Peggotty
