= David Copperfield (character) =

Fictional character created by Charles Dickens

- David Copperfield character
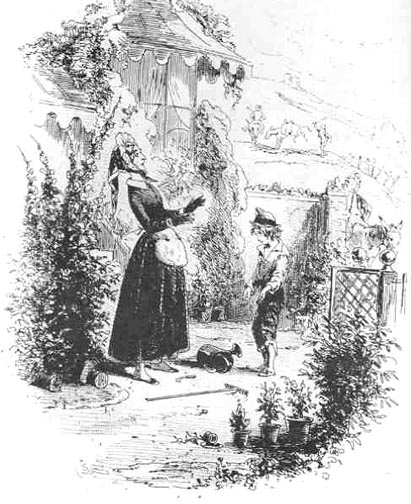
- David introduces himself to his aunt (Drawing by Hablot Knight Browne)
- Created by: Charles Dickens

In-universe information
- Gender: Male
- Occupation: Writer
- Family: Clara Copperfield (mother); Betsey Trotwood (great aunt); Dora Spenlow (first wife); Agnes Wickfield (second wife)
- Nationality: British

David Copperfield is the protagonist after which the 1850 Charles Dickens novel David Copperfield was named. The character is widely thought to be based on Dickens himself, incorporating many elements of his own life.

== Origin ==
Scholars believe that David Copperfield's childhood, career, friendships and love life were influenced by Dickens's experiences, especially his time working in a factory as a child. David's involvement with the law profession and later his career as a writer mirror the experiences of Dickens. Many of David's acquaintances are based on people Dickens actually knew. David's first wife, Dora Spenlow, is believed to be based upon Maria Beadnell, whom Dickens loved in his early youth. David's friend since boyhood and his second wife, Agnes Wickfield, the real heroine of the novel, is based on Dickens' sisters-in-law Mary and Georgina Hogarth; both of whom were very close to Dickens. Dickens keenly felt his deprived education during his time at the blacking factory, and according to the authoritative biography by his lifelong friend and literary advisor John Forster, it was from these times that he drew David's working period.

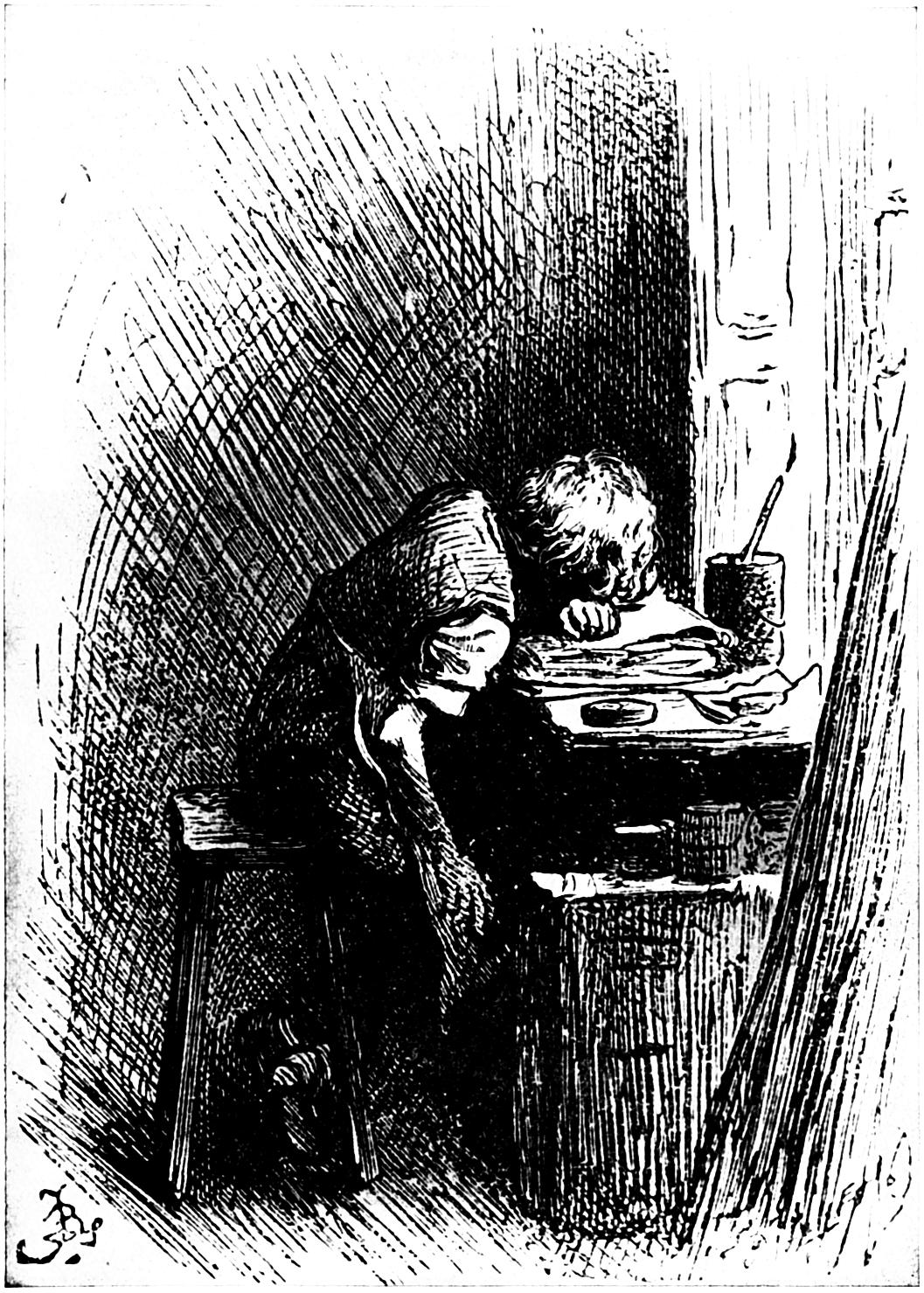
Charles Dickens working at Warren Blacking Factory

However, there are many differences in the lives of the two. Unlike Dickens, David grew up in the country as an only child; Dickens was a city boy with several brothers and sisters. Also there were never any wicked stepfather or any great aunt.

Throughout the novel, David is rarely called by his birth name (except by Mr. Murdstone); instead, he is called alternately Davy, Trot, Trotwood, Copperfield, Daisy and Doady. David Copperfield's birth name comes from Dickens' inverted initials.

== Novel in the first person, in the form of autobiography ==
David Copperfield is the pivotal character of the novel David Copperfield by Charles Dickens. He is first introduced in the novel when he is born on a Friday in March in the early 19th century. The pet of his mother Clara Copperfield and faithful housekeeper Peggotty, David lives an idyllic life for the first few years, even though he is fatherless—his father, David Copperfield Sr., died 6 months before his son's birth.

David's happy childhood is eventually marred by the arrival of his tyrannical stepfather, Edward Murdstone, and David suffers both physical and mental abuse from his new guardian. His mother is strongly discouraged from giving David any form of affection, and he is forbidden to consort with Peggotty or other children.

After a particularly brutal beating, David is sent off to Salem House school for biting Murdstone. He is met on the road by Mr Mell, one of the teachers, who accompanies him to the school. Young David is forced to wear a sign on his back that warns other students and teachers he is a biter. He befriends an older boy, the arrogant but charming James Steerforth, and the humorous Tommy Traddles. David reveals personal information about Mr Mell to Steerforth, who gets the young teacher fired.

When he learns that his mother is pregnant, David is very happy, and is able to see his mother and his (unnamed) baby brother during the holidays. Jane Murdstone is furious when she sees David holding the baby one day, and commands him never to touch Murdstone's child. Clara and Peggotty are still forbidden to treat David kindly (as the Murdstones view this to be weakness) but are able to sneak occasional happy moments together.

Another term at Salem House begins and David settles into his role as a student as best he can, despite the unorganized teaching and frequent lashings. On his ninth birthday the headmaster's wife informs David that his mother and half-brother have died, and David returns home for the funeral. Mr Murdstone and Jane, unwilling to care for the hated orphan, decide to send David to work in the family bottling factory.

Life at the factory is miserable, but David is befriended by the penniless Wilkins Micawber, a humorous character based on Dickens' father John Dickens. He lives with the Micawbers in poverty, and attempts to save money for his escape. After an unhappy year at the factory (which he refuses to describe in any detail) David runs away in hopes of finding his great-aunt Betsey Trotwood in Dover. His reception is frosty, but not unkind, and Miss Trotwood prevents Mr Murdstone from taking David back to the factory.

Aunt Betsey quickly adopts David and sends him to Dr Strong's private school in Canterbury. There, David resides in the house of Mr. Wickfield; and his daughter Agnes becomes David's friend and confidante. David also makes acquaintance of cunning and treacherous Uriah Heep, a clerk of Mr Wickfield.

The rest of the novel deals with David's struggles through life and his involvement in other plotlines, including his friendship and consequent disillusionment with unworthy and self-serving Steerforth, his assistance to the destroyed Peggotty family; his concern for the Wickfield, Micawber, and Strong families as they are all being cheated and abused by Uriah Heep, and the beginning and development of his writing career.

David falls in a passionate but highly impractical love with innocent, inexperienced, and foolish Dora Spenlow, daughter of his present boss. After a humorously sentimental courtship, marred by the sudden death of Mr Spenlow, David marries Dora, whom he loves.

David realizes he has different expectations from his wife of their roles in the marriage; he treats his wife with love, but is frustrated about how their household is run. After suffering a miscarriage over a year into their marriage, Dora falls ill and dies, leaving David single and heartbroken. He travels throughout Europe, and stays in Switzerland for three years.

During that time he publishes a story about his own life with the help of old school-friend Traddles, and realizes that he loves Agnes, praying she loves him too. Upon his return to England, after a vain struggle to hide his feelings, he realizes that she does love him. He proposes to her, and the duo quickly get married. They later move into a house in London, along with their young children, which include at least three girls (Little Agnes, Dora, and Betsey Trotwood Copperfield) and at least two boys. They live a wealthy lifestyle on David's successful writing career. David and Agnes prove to be a perfect match, and in this marriage David ultimately finds true happiness.

== Film and television portrayals ==
Year	Title	Young David Copperfield	David Copperfield
1911	David Copperfield	Flora Foster	Ed Genung
1935	David Copperfield	Freddie Bartholomew	Frank Lawton
1956	David Copperfield	Leonard Cracknell	Robert Hardy
1966	David Copperfield	Christopher Guard	Ian McKellen
1969	David Copperfield	Alastair Mackenzie	Robin Phillips
1974	David Copperfield	David Yelland	Jonathan Kahn
1986	David Copperfield	Nolan Hemmings/David Dexter	Colin Hurley
1993	David Copperfield	Julian Lennon (voice)	
1999	David Copperfield	Daniel Radcliffe	Ciarán McMenamin
2000	David Copperfield	Max Dolbey	Hugh Dancy
2019	The Personal History of David Copperfield	Jairaj Varsani	Dev Patel
