= David Copperfield (1986 serial) =

- Cover of the DVD
- Genre: Historical drama
- Based on: David Copperfield
- Directed by: Barry Letts
- Country of origin: United Kingdom
- Original language: English
- No. of series: 1
- No. of episodes: 10 (as broadcast) 5 (DVD re-edit)

Original release
- Network: BBC1
- Release: 19 October – 21 December 1986

David Copperfield is a 10 episode BBC serial broadcast between 19 October and 21 December 1986 and based on the 1850 novel David Copperfield by Charles Dickens. The series was written by James Andrew Hall and directed by Barry Letts. It was produced by Terrance Dicks.

The adaptation follows the story of David Copperfield as he grows up under the care of the cruel Murdstones after the death of his mother, escapes to the care of his aunt Betsey Trotwood and later travels to London where he meets the gentle Micawbers and the scheming Uriah Heep, and falls in love with and marries the spoilt Dora Spenlow.

The series was nominated for a BAFTA in the Children's Programme (Entertainment/Drama) 1986 category.

Scenes from the series were filmed at Holme-next-the-Sea in Norfolk.

The English DVD release with the original ten episode format has become almost impossible to find, with only the Dutch import that edited the episodes together to make it only five parts being available.

== Plot ==
For a detailed plot, see David Copperfield (novel).

== Cast ==
- Colin Hurley—David Copperfield
- Brenda Bruce—Betsey Trotwood
- Simon Callow—Wilkins Micawber
- Jeremy Brudenell—James Steerforth
- Francesca Hall—Dora Spenlow/Clara Copperfield
- Jenny McCracken—Clara Peggotty
- Ronald Herdman—Barkis
- Hilary Mason—Mrs Gummidge
- Natalie Ogle—Agnes Wickfield
- Owen Teale—Ham Peggotty
- Stephen Thorne—Daniel Peggotty
- Thorley Walters—Mr Dick
- Paul Brightwell—Uriah Heep
- Oliver Cotton—Edward Murdstone
- Sandra Payne—Emma Micawber
- Irene Richard—Julia Mills
- Neal Swettenham—Thomas Traddles
- Fanny Carby—Mrs Crupp
- Sarah Crowden—Jane Murdstone
- David Dexter—Young David
- Valerie Gogan—Emily
- Nolan Hemmings—Young David
- Terence Lodge—Francis Spenlow
- Nyree Dawn Porter—Mrs Steerforth
- John Baker—Tiffey
- Nicholas Bond-Owen—1st Boy
- Chris Chandler—2nd Boy
- Dylan Dolan—Young Traddles
- Leon Eagles—Mr Sharp
- Alison Fiske—Rosa Dartle
- Jonathan Lacey—Demple
- Artro Morris—Mr Wickfield
- Reggie Oliver—Mr Mell
- John Savident—Mr Creakle
- Ann Way—Mrs Heep
