= David Copperfield (1956 serial) =

- Radio Times cover, September 1956
- Genre: Period drama
- Based on: David Copperfield by Charles Dickens
- Screenplay by: Vincent Tilsley
- Directed by: Stuart Burge
- Starring: Robert Hardy; Sonia Dresdel; Richard Goolden
- Country of origin: United Kingdom
- Original language: English
- No. of episodes: 13 (all missing)

Production
- Producer: Douglas Allen
- Editor: Eddie Wallstab (filmed inserts)
- Running time: 30 minutes

Original release
- Network: BBC tv
- Release: 28 September – 21 December 1956

David Copperfield is a 1956 BBC Television adaptation of Charles Dickens' 1850 novel, serialised in 13 episodes. No recordings of this production are known to exist.

Although little is known of this version, it is said to have been remarkably similar to the 1966 BBC adaptation made almost a decade later, which was also written by Vincent Tilsley. It is also significant for being the first Dickens adaptation by the BBC for television.

== Cast ==
- Robert Hardy as David Copperfield
- Sonia Dresdel as Miss Betsey Trotwood
- Richard Goolden as Richard Babley (Mr Dick)
- Edna Morris as Clara Peggotty
- Mary Watson as Agnes Wickfield
- George Woodbridge as Daniel Peggotty
- Bernard Cribbins as Thomas Traddles
- Hilton Edwards as Mr Wilkins Micawber
- Sheila Shand Gibbs as Miss Dora Spenlow
- Mabel Constanduros as Mrs Gummidge
- Olga Lindo as Mrs Emma Micawber
- Maxwell Shaw as Uriah Heep
- George Skillan as Mr Wickfield
- Meadows White as Mr Barkis
- Leonard Cracknell as Young David Copperfield
- William Devlin as Mr Edward Murdstone
- Andrew Downie as Ham Peggotty
- Anthony Tancred as James Steerforth
- Dorothy Gordon as Little Emily
- Joan Hickson as Miss Lavinia Spenlow
- Mary Hinton as Mrs Steerforth
- Nora Nicholson as Miss Clarissa Spenlow
- Vi Stevens as Mrs Crupp
- Gwen Watford as Rosa Dartle
- Dorothy Black as Miss Jane Murdstone
- Glyn Dearman as Fat page
- John Dunbar as Coach passenger
- Diana Fairfax as David's mother
- Gretchen Franklin as Mrs Heep
- Kevin Stoney as Doctor
- André van Gyseghem as Mr Francis Spenlow
- John Vere as Littimer
- Raymond Adamson as Constable
- Michael Balfour as Pawnbroker
- Ralph Ball as Sailor
- Barbara Bolton as Mrs Sophy Traddles
- Elwyn Brook-Jones as Mr Creakle
- Ann Cherry as Janet
- Terry Cooke as Kemble
- Peter Copley as Mr Bellstruther
- Gerald Cross as Man
- Graham Crowden as Mr Gulpidge
- Laidlaw Dalling as Sailor
- Keith Davis as Thomas Traddles
- James Doran as Mick Walker
- Norman Foreman as Schoolboy
- Brian Franklin as Peel
- Willoughby Goddard as Mr Creakle
- Violet Gould as Publican's wife
- David J. Grahame
- Campbell Gray as Publican
- Ann Heffernan as French lady
- Meriel Hunn as Housemaid
- John Kidd as Mr Quinion
- Sam Kydd as Friendly waiter
- Marion Mathie as Mary Anne Paragon
- Donald McCollum as Servant
- Norman Osborne as Donkey boy
- Wensley Pithey as Mr Tungay
- Jack Rodney as Mr Blackboy
- Patricia Roots as Little Emily Leslie Smith
- Valerie Smith as Young Agnes Wickfield
- Ian Thompson as Mealy Potatoes
- David Tilley as Topsawyer
- Geoffrey Tyrrell as Mr Jorkins
- Charles Wade as Blind beggar
- Rosalie Westwater as Housemaid
- Ian Whittaker as Thin page

The series is notable for being the debut television appearance of three actors later to become household names: Robert Hardy, Bernard Cribbins and Graham Crowden.

== Archive status ==
All thirteen episodes are believed to be lost. Broadcast live with pre-filmed inserts for exterior scenes, it is unknown if this serial was ever telerecorded for preservation. If it was, the films were most likely junked sometime between 1967 and 1978, when the BBC routinely discarded older programmes to make way for new material. It was quite possibly even destroyed due to the later 1966 and 1974 adaptations making it obsolete for rebroadcast.
