= David Copperfield (1999 film) =

1999 British television drama

- DVD cover
- Based on: David Copperfield by Charles Dickens
- Written by: Adrian Hodges
- Directed by: Simon Curtis
- Starring: Daniel Radcliffe; Ciarán McMenamin; Maggie Smith; Pauline Quirke; Alun Armstrong; Trevor Eve; Bob Hoskins; Zoë Wanamaker; Emilia Fox; Oliver Ford Davies; Nicholas Lyndhurst; Imelda Staunton; Ian McNeice; Ian McKellen; Michael Elphick; Dawn French
- Composer: Rob Lane
- Country of origin: United Kingdom
- Original language: English
- No. of series: 1
- No. of episodes: 2

Production
- Executive producers: Jane Tranter; Rebecca Eaton
- Producer: Kate Harwood
- Running time: 185 minutes
- Production company: WGBH productions for the BBC

Original release
- Network: BBC One
- Release: 25 December – 26 December 1999

David Copperfield is a two-part BBC television drama adaptation of Charles Dickens's 1850 novel of the same name, written by Adrian Hodges. The first part was shown on Christmas Day 1999 and the second part the following day.

The production is the acting debut of Daniel Radcliffe, who later rose to stardom as the title character of the Harry Potter film series, where he collaborated with his David Copperfield co-stars Maggie Smith, Zoë Wanamaker, Imelda Staunton, Dawn French and Paul Whitehouse.

The series was co-produced by BBC America and Boston television station WGBH, and first aired on American television in April 2000, as a feature in the PBS series Masterpiece. It won a Peabody Award in 2000.

== Production ==
The original adaptation was written by John Sullivan, the writer of BBC sitcom Only Fools and Horses, and would have emphasised the comic aspects of Dickens' novel. The plan was to reunite former stars David Jason and Nicholas Lyndhurst on-screen, with Jason playing Wilkins Micawber and Lyndhurst in the role of Uriah Heep.

When Sullivan disagreed with the new direction and re-allocation of the adaptation to the BBC's drama department, he left the project, and Adrian Hodges' work was used instead. Lyndhurst remained with this production to play Uriah Heep, and the role of Micawber was taken by Bob Hoskins. Sullivan eventually moved to ITV, where in 2001 he produced a four-part series called Micawber, with Jason in the title role.

Ian McKellen, who plays Mr. Creakle in this adaptation, previously starred as the adult David Copperfield in the BBC's 1966 adaptation of the novel.

== Plot ==
=== Part one ===
David Copperfield is born in Blunderstone, Suffolk, three months after the death of his father, who was also called David Copperfield. On the night of David's birth, his great-aunt Betsey Trotwood arrives at the "Rookery" — the Copperfield family home — and eagerly anticipates the birth of a baby girl. She insists that Clara Copperfield's baby must be called Betsey Trotwood Copperfield and that she will be her godmother. However, when the delivered child turns out to be a boy, Miss Trotwood is horrified (as her previous experiences with men have all ended badly) and storms out.

David grows up loved and cared for by Clara and their maid, Peggotty. When David turns eight, Clara meets Edward Murdstone, a stern man whom David does not receive warmly. Peggotty offers to take David with her to Yarmouth to visit her brother Dan and his family, and he accepts, forming a bond with Dan's niece, Emily. When they return, David finds, to his horror, that his mother has married Murdstone. Murdstone invites his equally stern sister Jane to live with them, and the two Murdstones quickly assume complete control of the household, defeating any resistance in Clara to their strict methods, denying David any comfort from her or Peggotty's affection, and disciplining him harshly for the slightest infraction. When Murdstone canes David for falling behind in his studies, David bites him and, as punishment, is sent to Salem House, a boarding school owned by Murdstone's unpleasant friend Mr. Creakle, who is particularly harsh towards David at Murdstone's request. David's only comfort at the school is his friendship with James Steerforth, an older student from a wealthy family, who first defends him from a gang of bullies and then helps him win the respect of other pupils.

David returns home for the holidays and finds that Clara has given birth to a baby boy. Soon after returning to Salem House, he is informed by Creakle that his mother and half-brother have died, and he returns home for the funeral. Peggotty is dismissed, but becomes engaged to a local acquaintance, Mr. Barkis.

With the Murdstones now in full control of the Rookery and David's future, Murdstone takes David out of school and sends him to work in his factory in London, arranging for the boy to live with Wilkins Micawber, who treats David like his own son. Micawber is sent to a debtors' prison shortly afterwards. When he is released, he and his family are forced to move to Plymouth, leaving David homeless. David runs away from London to Dover to find Betsey Trotwood in the hope that she will take him in. At the outset of his journey, he has all his possessions stolen and is forced to sell most of his clothing and travel on foot. He manages to find her, and despite her initial reluctance to have a boy in her house, she takes him in and writes to inform the Murdstones of his arrival. Over time, David bonds with Betsey's lodger, Mr. Dick, and Betsey herself begins to feel attachment to her great-nephew. When Edward and Jane Murdstone arrive to take David back, Betsey appoints herself David's legal guardian, giving the Murdstones a verbal scolding for their cruelty and angrily ordering them out of her house. They are not seen or heard from again.

David, now going by the nickname Trotwood, given to him by his aunt, soon resumes his education at a school in Canterbury. During his time there he lodges with Miss Trotwood's friend, Mr Wickfield, whose daughter Agnes is of a similar age to David. They grow up together as brother and sister. On leaving school, David is apprenticed as a clerk to a lawyer called Mr. Spenlow. David meets Mr. Spenlow's daughter Dora and falls in love with her at first sight.

=== Part two ===
David sees Agnes at a party in London, where he also encounters Uriah Heep, Mr Wickfield's clerk. David tells Agnes of his love for Dora before running into his old friend Steerforth. Uriah tells David of his becoming a partner of Mr. Wickfield's and his desire to marry Agnes, much to David's disgust. He also warns David not to tell Agnes or her father of his intentions. Soon after, David enjoys an unexpected visit with the Micawbers before visiting Steerforth at his mother's home, where he also meets her companion, the erratic Rose Dartle.

David and Steerforth travel to Yarmouth, where they visit Peggotty and the ailing Mr Barkis and go on to visit the Peggotty family. Dan, Ham, Emily and Mrs Gummidge are still living in the boat house, and Ham is to marry Emily. Emily confides in David that she does not believe herself to be good enough for Ham and ignores David's reassurances. David makes one final stop to visit Peggotty and informs her of his plan to marry Dora.

At David's lodgings in London, the Micawbers come for dinner, and Micawber reveals that he has been hired to work for Uriah Heep. A few days later David expresses his feeling to Dora, who accepts his proposal. On returning home that evening, David finds Mr Dick and Miss Trotwood on his doorstep, declaring that she is ruined. Concerned that Mr. Wickfield was "no longer the man of business he once was", she had withdrawn her trust fund from his control, reinvested it herself, and "lost the lot". Since he is now without his aunt's financial support, David and Dora agree to keep their engagement secret. David returns to Canterbury to see the Wickfields and reveals to Mr Micawber that he suspects Heep of trying to control Wickfield's business. When Heep declares his intention to marry Agnes, Mr Wickfield responds angrily. The next day, Agnes tells David that her father has apologised to Heep, on whom he is now dependent. Upon David's next visit to Mr Spenlow, he finds that his engagement to Dora has been discovered and is not welcomed by her family. Unwilling to give up Dora, David tries once again to convince Mr Spenlow of his worthiness, but later discovers him dead from a heart attack.

David visits Yarmouth again after he receives a letter from Peggotty, informing him that Barkis's health is deteriorating and that he will die soon. Barkis eventually dies and leaves £3,000 in his will - the interest on £1,000 to Dan Peggotty and £2,000 to Peggotty.

Ham then tells David that Emily has run off with Steerforth, who had been lodging somewhere in the area and visiting her in secret. They inform Steerforth's mother and Rosa of his disappearance, and the women reply that they will not allow Steerforth to marry Emily. Dan is insulted with their offer of financial compensation and leaves to begin a search for Emily, which stretches to other parts of Europe. Rosa declares her ill will toward Emily for ruining the family.

David learns that the late Mr. Spenlow was bankrupt and comforts Dora. He then begins to write and to sell his stories. He introduces Dora to Agnes, and Dora and David get married. David becomes frustrated by Dora's inability to run a household but decides to adapt himself to her, and their marriage improves. Dora becomes pregnant, only to suffer a miscarriage which leaves her badly weakened and bedridden.

David sees Rosa Dartle in a London slum and follows her to Emily, sending for Dan Peggotty. The two rescue her as Rosa confronts her and Mr. Peggotty promises they can start a new life in Australia. Emily begs David to take a letter of apology to Ham, but on his arrival at Yarmouth he finds a fierce storm raging and a ship in peril just off the shore. Ham attempts to rescue a passenger, who turns out to be Steerforth, but both are drowned.

Back in Canterbury, Micawber reveals that he has uncovered Heep's villainous schemes, which have ruined both Mr Wickfield and Betsey Trotwood. Wickfield sends Mr Dick to summon the police, and Heep is arrested. Betsey Trotwood's trust fund is restored, and in thanks she offers to pay for a fresh start for the Micawbers in Australia. At the harbour they are faced with a policeman who has a warrant for Mr Micawber's arrest - again for unpaid debts. Betsey Trotwood pays off the debt leaving Micawber free to board the ship to Australia. Dan and Emily join the Micawbers on the voyage. Peggotty insists that the news of Ham's death be kept from Emily until she is strong enough to cope. Dan invites his sister to join him in Australia, but she chooses to stay in England with David and Dora. Another passenger on the ship is Heep, one of a group of convicts in chains being loaded for penal transportation.

Peggotty helps care for Dora, whose health is declining. She dies after calling Agnes to her bedside. In his grief David disappears for three years, during which time he continues to write and has his first two books published.

On David's return to Canterbury, he realizes that he loves Agnes Wickfield. After much prodding, Agnes reveals that she has always been in love with David and even had Dora's dying approval. They are married and within a few years have two sons. David receives a visit from Mr. Peggotty, back from Australia. He brings news that Emily has made a full recovery and that Micawber has established himself as a successful magistrate and bank manager. The story closes with the birth of David and Agnes's third child - a girl. Betsey Trotwood's wish finally comes true after some 30 years, as David decides that the baby will be christened Betsey Trotwood Copperfield, in honour of her godmother.

== Cast ==
- Ciarán McMenamin as David Copperfield (Adult)
  - Daniel Radcliffe as David Copperfield (Young)
- Emilia Fox as Clara Copperfield
- Maggie Smith as Betsey Trotwood
- Trevor Eve as Edward Murdstone
- Zoë Wanamaker as Jane Murdstone
- Pauline Quirke as Clara Peggotty
- Michael Elphick as Barkis
- Alun Armstrong as Dan Peggotty
- James Thornton as Ham Peggotty
- Patsy Byrne as Mrs Gummidge
- Aislin McGuckin as Emily (Adult)
  - Laura Harling as Emily (Young)
- Ian McKellen as Mr Creakle
- Karl Johnson as Tungay
- Oliver Milburn as James Steerforth (Adult)
  - Harry Lloyd as James Steerforth (Young)
- Cherie Lunghi as Mrs Steerforth
- Kenneth MacDonald as Littimer
- Bob Hoskins as Wilkins Micawber
- Imelda Staunton as Emma Micawber
- Dawn French as Mrs Crupp
- Paul Whitehouse as the Pawnbroker
- Ian McNeice as Mr. Dick
- James Grout as Mr Spenlow
- Joanna Page as Dora Spenlow
- Nicholas Lyndhurst as Uriah Heep
- Thelma Barlow as Mrs Heep
- Oliver Ford Davies as Mr Wickfield
- Amanda Ryan as Agnes Wickfield (Adult)
  - Antonia Corrigan as Agnes Wickfield (Young)
- Morgane Slemp as Clara (Young)
- Clare Holman as Rosa Dartle
- Tom Wilkinson as Narrator (as old David)

== Some locations in the story ==
- Blunderstone is the village in Suffolk where David Copperfield is born. He lives at a house called The Rookery with his mother Clara and servant Peggotty. When Clara Copperfield marries Mr Murdstone, he moves into the house and is soon joined by his sister. Their presence turns the house into an unhappy place and David suffers particular cruelty, being sent away to Salem House boarding school after he bites Mr Murdstone during a beating. David finally leaves Blunderstone after his mother's death, when Mr Murdstone sends him to work in London.
- Yarmouth is the Norfolk seaside town where Peggotty's relatives live in a boat house with their friend Mrs Gummidge. David visits the place as a child and returns about a decade later to visit the Peggotty family. After Ham's death, Dan, Emily and Mrs Gummidge move to Australia to start a new life - something which was particularly beneficial to Emily after her relationship with Steerforth.
- Salem House is the London boarding school where David Copperfield is sent after he bites Mr Murdstone. The cruel headteacher, Mr Creakle, is a friend of Mr Murdstone and singles out David for extra torment. David leaves the school after his mother's death, when he is sent to work at Mr Murdstone's factory. His best friend at the school is an older boy called Steerforth, who first rescues him from a gang of bullies, and who he meets again as an adult.
- London first features in the story when David is sent to work in Mr Murdstone's factory. He lives with the financially troubled Mr Micawber, who served time in a debtors' prison, until the Micawbers move to Plymouth. David then decides to go to Dover in the hope that Betsey Trotwood will take him in. London features again when David begins his working life apprenticed to a lawyer called Mr Spenlow. During his time in London, David meets Dora Spenlow - who becomes his first wife.
- Dover is the seaside town in Kent where David goes to find Betsey Trotwood after the Micawbers leave London. She agrees to take him in and he lives at the house with Betsey and her lodger Mr Dick.
- Canterbury is the city in Kent where David Copperfield resumes his education. He grows up as a lodger at the house of Mr Wickfield, Betsey Trotwood's business manager, whose daughter Agnes eventually becomes David's second wife and mother of their three children. Also living at the house is Mr Wickfield's lurking clerk Uriah Heep, who is eventually discovered to have committed fraud against Miss Trotwood and Mr Wickfield.
- Highgate is where James Steerforth lives with his mother Mrs Steerforth and his cousin Rosa Dartle. David visits the house several times, first after he meets Steerforth for the first time since his schooldays, again when he informs Mrs Steerforth that her son has run away with Emily, and lastly when he informs Mrs Steerforth that her son had drowned at Yarmouth.
