= David Copperfield (2000 film) =

2000 American-Irish drama film

- Based on: David Copperfield by Charles Dickens
- Written by: John Goldsmith
- Directed by: Peter Medak
- Starring: Hugh Dancy; Sally Field; Michael Richards; Eileen Atkins; Anthony Andrews
- Music by: Shaun Davey
- Countries of origin: United States; Ireland
- Original language: English

Production
- Producers: John Davis; Greg Smith
- Cinematography: Elemér Ragályi
- Editor: Ron Davis
- Running time: 180 minutes (3 60 min episodes)

Original release
- Network: TNT
- Release: 10 December – 11 December 2000

David Copperfield is a 2000 American-Irish made-for-television film adaptation of Charles Dickens's 1850 novel of the same name. It was filmed in Ireland, and broadcast on TNT as a Hallmark Entertainment production on 10–11 December 2000.

== Plot ==
The film centres on the journey of David Copperfield, from experiencing an impoverished and miserable childhood to becoming a successful and famous author.

== Cast ==
- Hugh Dancy as David Copperfield
- Max Dolbey as young David Copperfield
- Sally Field as Betsey Trotwood
- Michael Richards as Wilkins Micawber
- Paul Bettany as James Steerforth
- Eileen Atkins as Jane Murdstone
- Anthony Andrews as Edward Murdstone
- Frank McCusker as Uriah Heep
- Emily Hamilton as Agnes Wickfield
- Edward Hardwicke as Mr. Wickfield
- Julie Cox as Dora Spenlow
- Oliver Ford Davies as Mr. Jorkins
- Nigel Davenport as Dan Peggotty
- Judy Cornwell as Clara Peggotty
- Freddie Jones as Barkis
- Sarah Farooqui as adult Emily
- Anna Maguire as Little Emily
- Dudley Sutton as Mr. Dick
- Sarah Smart as Clara Copperfield
- Simon Delaney as Thomas Traddles
- Peter Woodthorpe as Mr. Creakle
- Terrence Orr as Tungay

== Production ==
=== Writing ===
The plot follows relatively closely to that of the book, although the film highly condenses Steerforth's liaison with Emily and the Peggotty family to primarily off-screen action, as in the 1935 version, and omitting the famous "tempest" scene. An extra plotline placing emphasis on the Murdstone siblings is also included, so that David is tormented by their appearance throughout his life, and eventually violently confronts them near the ending, a scene not present in the book. Some scenes are simplified as well; for instance, Uriah Heep's cunning and complex embezzlement scheme from the book is changed to a very simple plotline involving stolen diamonds. However, this film stresses the relationship between David, Agnes, and Uriah much more than in previous adaptations.

== Reception ==
=== Critical reception ===
The film is generally well received by viewers and critics alike, although some viewers dislike the straying from the book's plot material, and some critics feel Hugh Dancy gave a weak performance in the title role. Most criticism stems from the choice of American actors Sally Field and Michael Richards, portraying the classic roles of Betsey Trotwood and Wilkins Micawber, though Field was a last-minute replacement for Angela Lansbury.
