= The Personal History of David Copperfield =

2019 film directed by Armando Iannucci

- U.K. theatrical release poster
- Directed by: Armando Iannucci
- Screenplay by: Simon Blackwell; Armando Iannucci
- Based on: David Copperfield by Charles Dickens
- Produced by: Armando Iannucci; Kevin Loader
- Starring: Dev Patel; Aneurin Barnard; Peter Capaldi; Morfydd Clark; Daisy May Cooper; Rosalind Eleazar; Hugh Laurie; Tilda Swinton; Ben Whishaw; Paul Whitehouse
- Cinematography: Zac Nicholson
- Edited by: Mick Audsley; Peter Lambert
- Music by: Christopher Willis
- Production companies: FilmNation Entertainment; Film4
- Distributed by: Lionsgate (United Kingdom); Searchlight Pictures (North America)
- Release dates: September 5, 2019 (TIFF); January 24, 2020 (United Kingdom); August 28, 2020 (United States)
- Running time: 119 minutes
- Countries: United Kingdom; United States
- Language: English
- Budget: $15.6 million
- Box office: $14.6 million

The Personal History of David Copperfield is a 2019 historical comedy-drama film written and directed by Armando Iannucci, based on the 1850 novel David Copperfield by Charles Dickens. It stars Dev Patel as the title character, along with Aneurin Barnard, Peter Capaldi, Morfydd Clark, Daisy May Cooper, Rosalind Eleazar, Hugh Laurie, Tilda Swinton, Ben Whishaw and Paul Whitehouse.

The world premiere was at the Toronto International Film Festival on 5 September 2019 and was theatrically released in the United Kingdom on 24 January 2020 by Lionsgate and in the United States on 28 August 2020 by Searchlight Pictures.

== Plot ==
David Copperfield is born to his widowed mother, Clara, and begins saving noteworthy quotes from his life on scraps of paper. As a child, he visits his nanny Peggotty's family in their upturned-boat house in Yarmouth. When David returns home, he discovers Clara has married Edward Murdstone, a strict and callous factory owner. After being beaten by Murdstone and bullied by Murdstone's sister Jane, David is sent to work in Murdstone's bottling factory in London, where he lodges with the Micawber family, who are always cheerful but frequently pursued by their creditors.

As a young man, David still works at the factory, while the Micawbers are evicted by bailiffs and sent to debtors' prison. Informed of his mother's death only after her funeral, David wreaks havoc in the factory and departs for Dover to find his wealthy aunt Betsey Trotwood, his only living relative. Her lodger, the eccentric Mr. Dick, believes himself to be burdened with the late King Charles I’s thoughts and, like David, jots them down. David attaches these notes to a kite for Mr. Dick to fly, which helps clear his mind. David meets Betsey's accountant, Mr. Wickfield, and Wickfield's daughter, Agnes.

Admitted to a school for boys, David is befriended by his classmate, James Steerforth, who calls him Daisy and believes him to be a gentleman. Later, a butcher's lad mocks the two friends and David challenges him to a fight — David gets knocked out. Agnes tends to his wounds but David disappoints her by saying he thinks of her as a sister. Mr. Micawber briefly joins the school as a teacher, but is exposed by Steerforth as a former convict and fired. Mr. Wickfield's clerk Uriah Heep, who has previously been mocked by the boys, tries to blackmail David with knowledge of his past. At a farewell party at school, David meets Steerforth's mother, ignores his future employer, and falls in love with a somewhat ditsy girl named Dora Spenlow. He is hired as a trainee lawyer with Dora's father's firm in London, where he lives the life of a "young gentleman" and courts Dora.

Betsey arrives in London with Mr. Dick, having lost her fortune and home, and David is forced to decamp with them to a slum dwelling offered by Uriah, who has been keeping Mr. Wickfield drunk and persuaded him to make him a partner. Uriah is also courting Agnes. David visits Pegotty's family in their boat-house with Steerforth, who runs away with Pegotty's adopted daughter Emily, leaving her longtime fiancé Ham. Mr. Micawber now lives on the streets with his family and has pawned his beloved concertina, which he asks Mr. Dick to buy back. Instead, Mr. Dick steals it for him, and David invites the Micawbers to move in with him, Betsey, and Mr. Dick.

David begins to write the story of his life as a book, using the fragments he has saved since childhood. Agnes asks David, Micawber, Betsey, and Mr. Dick for a letter written by Mr. Wickfield as evidence of Uriah’s misdeeds. They confront Uriah, who has been embezzling funds — including Betsey’s missing fortune — by forging Mr. Wickfield's signature, presenting the letter as proof. David punches Uriah after the villainous clerk strikes Betsey, and dismisses him. Recognising that she no longer fits in David's "story", Dora calls off their engagement, asking him to write her out of his book.

Emily is spotted in London and confronted by Steerforth’s mother, but rescued by David and Pegotty’s family. She reveals that Steerforth abandoned her in France, but he will return the following day to Yarmouth. When a storm wrecks Steerforth’s boat off the Yarmouth beach, Ham swims out on a line, but Steerforth refuses to be rescued and is drowned. Mourning his feckless friend’s death, David realises he is in love with Agnes, who reciprocates. He publishes his book to great success, performing public readings of his story. His new career as a writer allows him to buy back Betsey’s home for her and Mr. Dick and continue to support the Micawbers, and he and Agnes marry and have a daughter.

== Cast ==
- Dev Patel as David Copperfield
  - Ranveer Jaiswal as 4–7-year-old David
  - Jairaj Varsani as Young David
- Nikki Amuka-Bird as Mrs. Steerforth
- Aneurin Barnard as James Steerforth
- Darren Boyd as Edward Murdstone
- Peter Capaldi as Mr. Micawber
- Gwendoline Christie as Jane Murdstone
- Morfydd Clark as Dora Spenlow and Clara Copperfield
- Daisy May Cooper as Peggotty
- Matthew Cottle as Mr. Spenlow
- Rosalind Eleazar as Agnes Wickfield
- Bronagh Gallagher as Mrs. Micawber
- Aimee Kelly as Emily
- Hugh Laurie as Mr. Dick
- Tilda Swinton as Betsey Trotwood
- Anthony Welsh as Ham Peggotty
- Ben Whishaw as Uriah Heep
- Paul Whitehouse as Mr. Peggotty
- Benedict Wong as Mr. Wickfield
- Anna Maxwell Martin as Mrs. Strong
- Victor McGuire as Creakle
- Peter Singh as Tungay
- Ruby Bentall as Janet
- Divian Ladwa as Dr. Chillip
- Rosaleen Linehan as Mrs. Gummidge
- Sophie McShera as Mrs. Crupp
- Fisayo Akinade as Markham

== Production ==
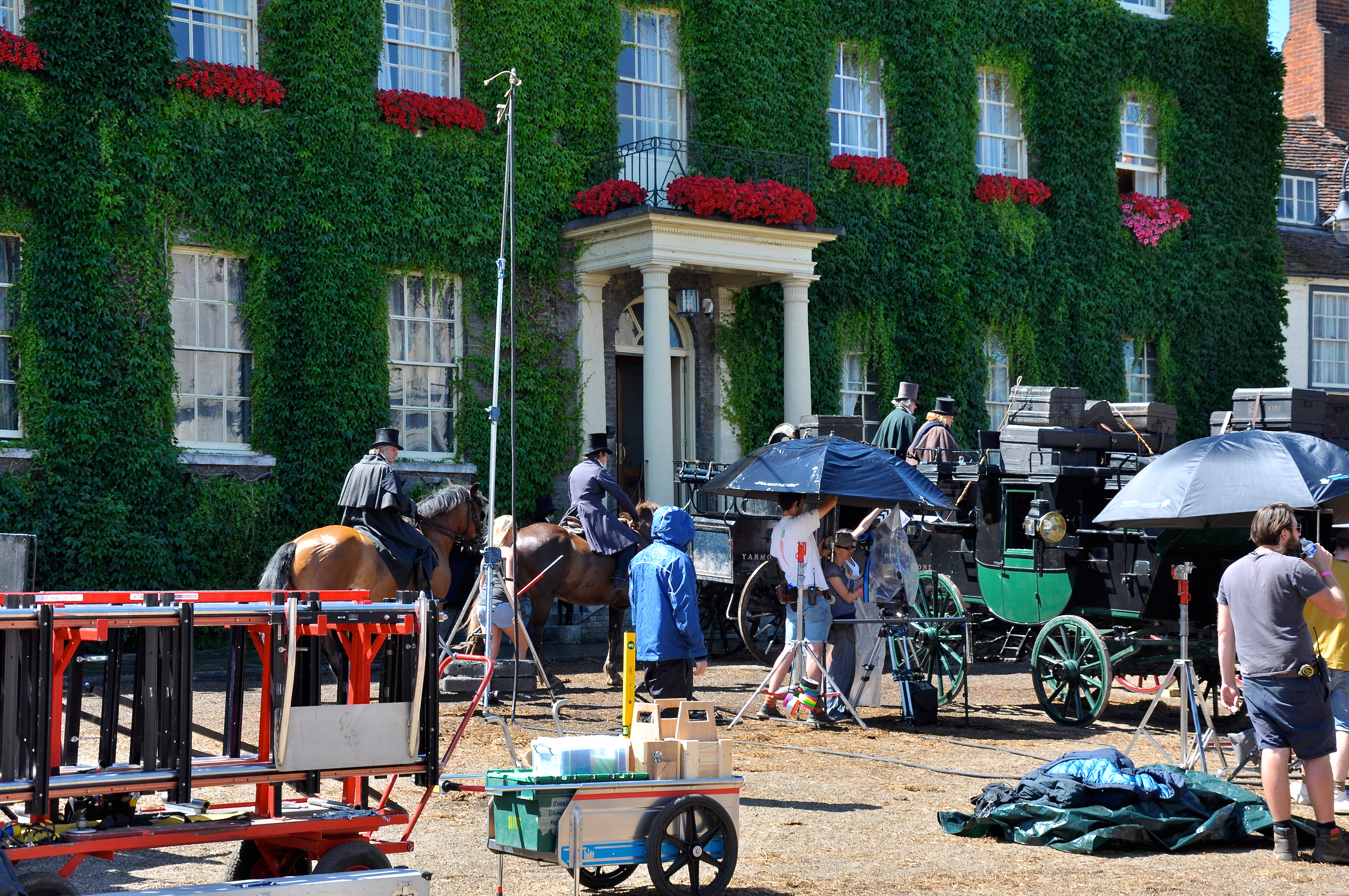
Filming took place in Bury St Edmunds in July 2018

It was announced in February 2018 that Armando Iannucci would write, direct and produce a new adaptation of the Charles Dickens novel. Iannucci wrote the screenplay with Simon Blackwell. Dev Patel was cast in the title role later that month. In April, the supporting cast was added, which included Tilda Swinton, Hugh Laurie, Aneurin Barnard, Ben Whishaw and Morfydd Clark. In May 2018, Peter Capaldi was cast as Mr. Micawber and pre-production was underway.

Filming began in June 2018 in Norfolk and Suffolk, with Gwendoline Christie, Benedict Wong, Paul Whitehouse and Daisy May Cooper joining the cast. Aimee Kelly was added to the cast in July.

Principal photography concluded in August 2018. It was the first theatrical film production of Dickens's novel in 50 years, and the first on-screen adaptation in 19 years.

=== Locations ===
Scenes were shot in Hull, Bury St Edmunds, Weybourne and King's Lynn in July.

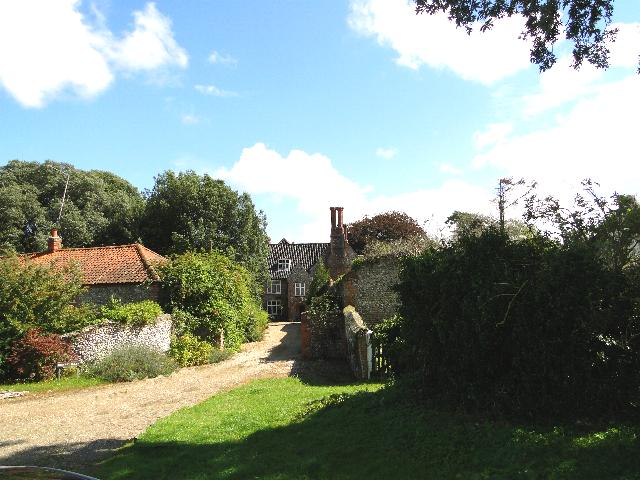
Berry Hall in Great Walsingham

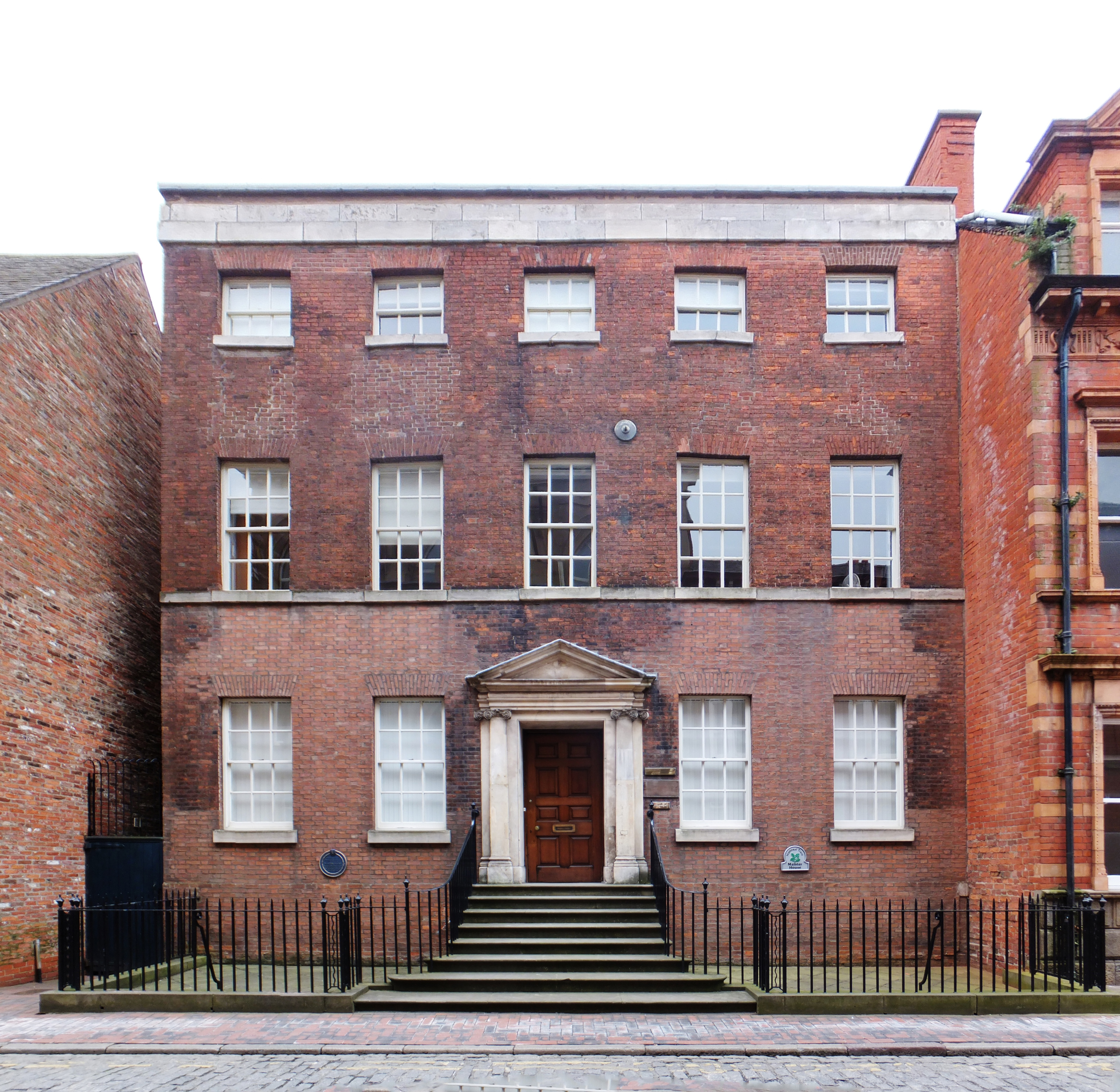
Maister House in Kingston upon Hull

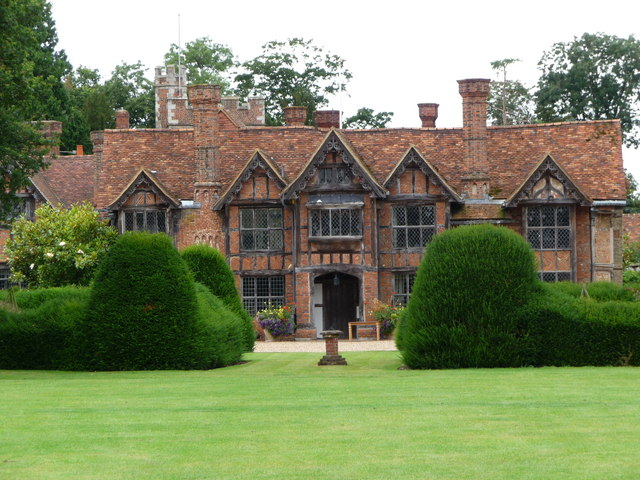
Dorney Court in Buckinghamshire

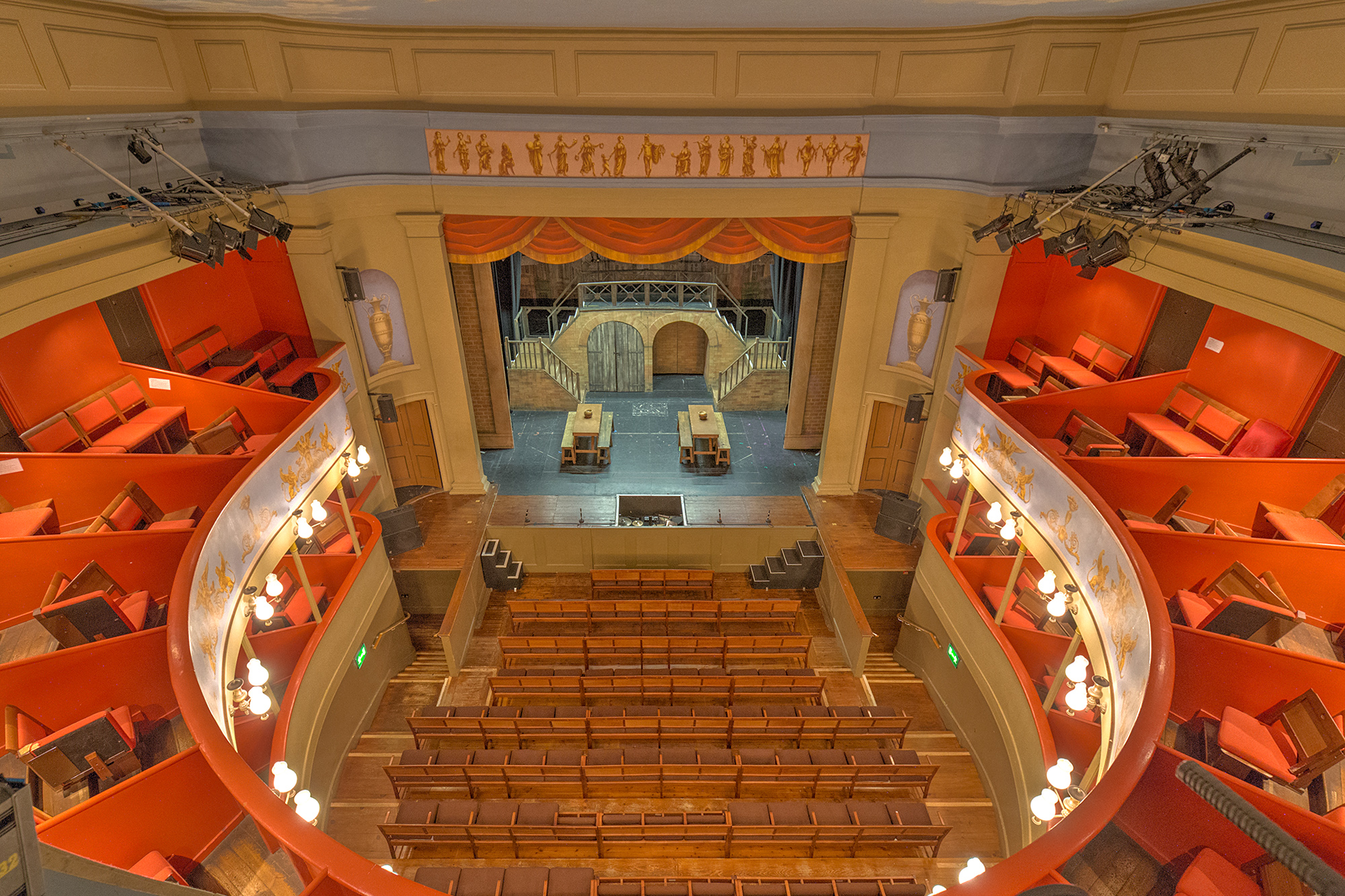
The Theatre Royal in Bury St Edmunds

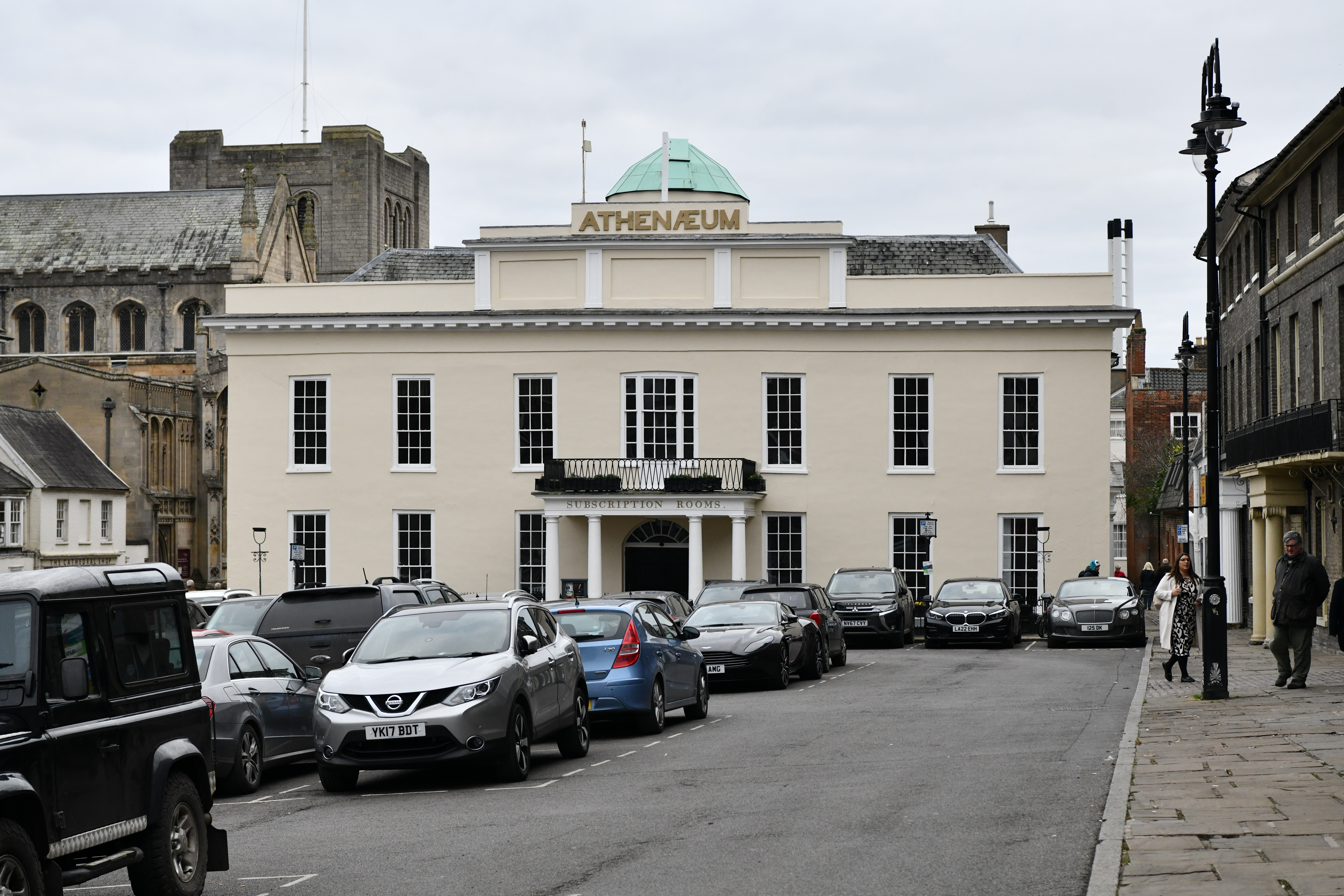
The Athenaeum in Bury St Edmunds

== Release ==
The film had its world premiere at the Toronto International Film Festival on 5 September 2019, followed by its European premiere on 2 October 2019, acting as the opening film of the 63rd BFI London Film Festival. It was the Surprise Film at the 39th Cambridge Film Festival. It was released in the United Kingdom by Lionsgate on 24 January 2020. In August 2019, Fox Searchlight Pictures acquired North American rights to the film and scheduled the release on 8 May 2020. However, due to the impact of the COVID-19 pandemic on cinema, it was theatrically released later on 28 August 2020.

== Reception ==
=== Box office ===
Although it received critical acclaim, The Personal History of David Copperfield underperformed at the box office, as its North American release came during the COVID-19 pandemic, when many cinemas were restricted from opening.

In the United Kingdom, it took $2m in its first week and a total gross of around $8 million by the start of March, when the pandemic began to affect cinemas. In the United States, it debuted $520,000 from 1,360 cinemas in August; playing in 1,550 cinemas the following weekend it fell 24% to $361,000. It went in to gross $1.9 million in the United States and Canada, and $12.8 million in the rest of the world, for a worldwide total of $14.6 million against a production budget of $15.6 million.

=== Critical response ===
On review aggregator website Rotten Tomatoes, the film holds an approval rating of 92% based on 248 reviews, with an average rating of 7.6/10. The website's critics consensus reads: "The Personal History of David Copperfield puts a fresh, funny, and utterly charming spin on Dickens' classic, proving some stories truly are timeless." On Metacritic, the film has a weighted average score of 77 out of 100, based on 39 critics, indicating "generally favourable reviews". PostTrak reported that 74% of audience members gave the film a positive score, with 50% saying they would recommend it.

Writing for The Observer, Mark Kermode awarded the film a full five stars and stated: "It really is a wonderfully entertaining film, managing to both respect and reinvent the novel from which it takes its lead."

=== Accolades ===
Award	Date of ceremony	Category	Recipient(s)	Result	Ref.
British Independent Film Awards	1 December 2019	Best British Independent Film	Armando Iannucci, Simon Blackwell & Kevin Loader	Nominated	
British Independent Film Awards	1 December 2019	Best Actor	Dev Patel	Nominated	
British Independent Film Awards	1 December 2019	Best Supporting Actor	Hugh Laurie	Won	
British Independent Film Awards	1 December 2019	Best Supporting Actress	Tilda Swinton	Nominated	
British Independent Film Awards	1 December 2019	Best Screenplay	Armando Iannucci and Simon Blackwell	Won	
British Independent Film Awards	1 December 2019	Best Casting	Sarah Crowe	Won	
British Independent Film Awards	1 December 2019	Best Cinematography	Zac Nicholson	Nominated	
British Independent Film Awards	1 December 2019	Best Costume Design	Suzie Harman and Robert Worley	Won	
British Independent Film Awards	1 December 2019	Best Editing	Mick Audsley and Peter Lambert	Nominated	
British Independent Film Awards	1 December 2019	Best Make Up & Hair Design	Karen Hartley-Thomas	Nominated	
British Independent Film Awards	1 December 2019	Best Production Design	Cristina Casali	Won	
London Film Week Awards	1 December 2019	Best Film	Armando Iannucci	Nominated	
London Film Week Awards	1 December 2019	Best Screenplay	Armando Iannucci and Simon Blackwell	Won	
British Academy Film Awards	2 February 2020	Best Casting	Sarah Crowe	Nominated	
Boulder International Film Festival Awards	5 March 2020	Best Feature Film	Armando Iannucci	Won	
European Film Awards	12 December 2020	Best Production Designer	Cristina Casali	Won	
St. Louis Film Critics Association Awards		Best Production Design	Cristina Casali	Nominated	
Satellite Awards	15 February 2021	Best Motion Picture – Comedy or Musical		Nominated	
Satellite Awards	15 February 2021	Best Actor in a Motion Picture – Comedy or Musical	Dev Patel	Nominated	
Satellite Awards	15 February 2021	Best Costume Design	Suzie Harman and Robert Worley	Won	
Satellite Awards	15 February 2021	Best Art Direction and Production Design	Cristina Casali and Charlotte Dirickx	Nominated	
Golden Globe Awards	28 February 2021	Best Actor in a Motion Picture – Musical Comedy	Dev Patel	Nominated	
Hollywood Critics Association Awards	5 March 2021	Best Comedy/Musical		Nominated	
Hollywood Critics Association Awards	5 March 2021	Best Costume Design	Suzie Harman and Robert Worley	Won	
Hollywood Critics Association Awards	5 March 2021	Best Production Design	Cristina Casali	Nominated	
Critics’ Choice Movie Awards	7 March 2021	Best Costume Design	Suzie Harman and Robert Worley	Nominated	
Critics’ Choice Movie Awards	7 March 2021	Best Production Design	Cristina Casali and Charlotte Dirickx	Nominated	
Casting Society of America	15 April 2021	Feature Big Budget – Comedy	Sarah Crowe	Nominated	
