= David Copperfield (1969 film) =

1969 British-American film by Delbert Mann

- Directed by: Delbert Mann
- Written by: Jack Pulman
- Based on: David Copperfield; 1850 novel by Charles Dickens
- Produced by: Frederick H. Brogger
- Starring: Robin Phillips; Ralph Richardson; Ron Moody; Laurence Olivier
- Cinematography: Ken Hodges
- Edited by: Peter Boita
- Music by: Malcolm Arnold
- Production company: Omnibus Productions
- Distributed by: 20th Century Fox
- Release dates: 2 January 1970 (UK); 15 March 1970 (US)
- Running time: 118 minutes 120 minutes (US)
- Country: United Kingdom
- Language: English

David Copperfield is a 1969 British film directed by Delbert Mann based on the 1850 novel of the same name by Charles Dickens, adapted by Jack Pulman. The film was released in the UK in 1970. It stars Robin Phillips in the title role and Ralph Richardson as Micawber, and features well-known actors Richard Attenborough, Laurence Olivier, Susan Hampshire, Cyril Cusack, Wendy Hiller, Edith Evans, Michael Redgrave and Ron Moody.

== Plot ==
Charles Dickens's story of a young man's journey to maturity. This version finds David Copperfield as a young man, brooding on a deserted beach. In flashback, David remembers his life in 19th-century Britain, as a young orphan, brought to London and passed around from relatives, to guardians, to boarding school. He relives his struggle to overcome the loss of his idyllic childhood and the torment inflicted by his hated stepfather after his mother's death. Then virtually abandoned on the streets of Victorian London, David Copperfield is flung into manhood and contends bravely with the perils of big-city corruption and vice; hardships which ultimately fuel his triumph as a talented and successful writer.

== Cast ==
- Richard Attenborough as Mr. Tungay
- Cyril Cusack as Barkis
- Edith Evans as Betsy Trotwood
- Pamela Franklin as Dora Spenlow
- Susan Hampshire as Agnes Wickfield
- Wendy Hiller as Emma Micawber
- Ron Moody as Uriah Heep
- Laurence Olivier as Mr. Creakle
- Alistair Mackenzie as David Copperfield as a child.
- Robin Phillips as David Copperfield
- Michael Redgrave as Daniel Peggotty
- Ralph Richardson as Wilkins Micawber
- Emlyn Williams as Mr. Dick
- Sinéad Cusack as Emily
- James Donald as Edward Murdstone
- James Hayter as Porter
- Megs Jenkins as Clara Peggotty
- Anna Massey as Jane Murdstone
- Andrew McCulloch as Ham Peggotty
- Nicholas Pennell as Thomas Traddles
- Corin Redgrave as James Steerforth
- Isobel Black as Clara Copperfield
- Liam Redmond as Mr. Quinion

== Production ==
It was made in the UK for 20th Century Fox Television with some exteriors filmed in Suffolk, and interior scenes filmed at The Swan Hotel in Southwold.

The music score was the last Malcolm Arnold wrote for a film.

== Release ==
The film was made to be shown on television in the United States, but was released to cinemas in the United Kingdom and elsewhere.

The film had its premiere at the Carlton Haymarket in London on 2 January 1970. It opened at Studio One and on the Rank Organisation's circuit in North London on 4 January 1970.

== Home media ==
The film is available on a variety of budget label DVDs, but all of them are very poor-quality transfers.
