= Spider's Web (1982 film) =

British television film

- Genre: Mystery
- Based on: Spider's Web by Agatha Christie
- Directed by: Basil Coleman
- Starring: Penelope Keith; Robert Flemyng; Thorley Walters
- Composer: Norman Kay
- Country of origin: United Kingdom
- Original language: English

Production
- Producer: Cedric Messina
- Running time: 105 minutes
- Production company: BBC

Original release
- Network: BBC Two
- Release: 26 December 1982

Spider's Web is a 1982 British mystery television film directed by Basil Coleman and starring Penelope Keith, Robert Flemyng and Thorley Walters. It is an adaptation of the 1954 play of the same title by Agatha Christie, produced with very few alterations from the original dialogue.

== Cast ==
- Penelope Keith as Clarissa Hailsham-Brown
- Robert Flemyng as Sir Rowland Delahaye
- Thorley Walters as Hugo Birch
- Elizabeth Spriggs as Mildred Peake
- David Yelland as Jeremy Warrender
- John Barcroft as Inspector Lord
- Holly Aird as Pippa Hailsham-Brown
- Jonathan Newth as Henry Hailsham-Brown
- Brian Protheroe as Oliver Costello
- David Crosse as Elgin
- Mark Draper as Constable Jones
- Lee Fox as Doctor

== Bibliography ==
- Aldridge, Mark. Agatha Christie on Screen. Springer, 2016.
