= James Steerforth =

- David Copperfield character
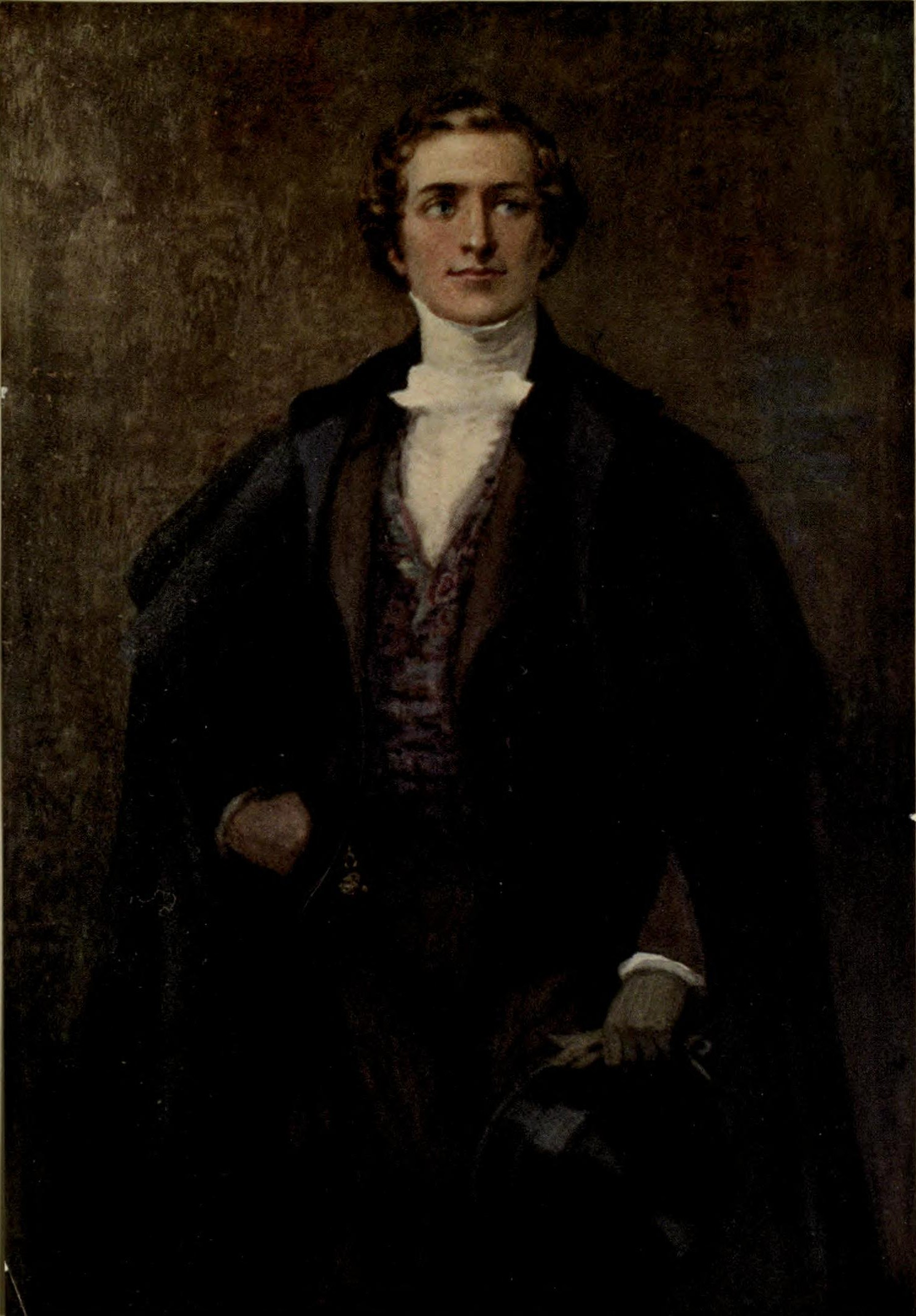
- James Steerforth. Art by Frank Reynolds.
- Created by: Charles Dickens

In-universe information
- Gender: Male
- Nationality: British

James Steerforth is a character in the 1850 novel David Copperfield by Charles Dickens. He is a handsome young man noted for his wit and romantic charm. Though he is well liked by his friends, he proves himself to be condescending and lacking in consideration for others.

== In David Copperfield by Charles Dickens ==
=== At Salem House ===
David Copperfield first meets James Steerforth as a boy attending Salem House boarding school. He is a few years older than David, and is first seen when dealing with a group of younger boys who are taunting David about biting his stepfather. David quickly comes to admire and respect him, as the other boys at the school do, and a friendship begins to develop between the two. David looks up to Steerforth – as a sort of protector – who is said to be the only boy at the school bold enough to stand up to and intimidate Mr Creakle, the school's strict headmaster.

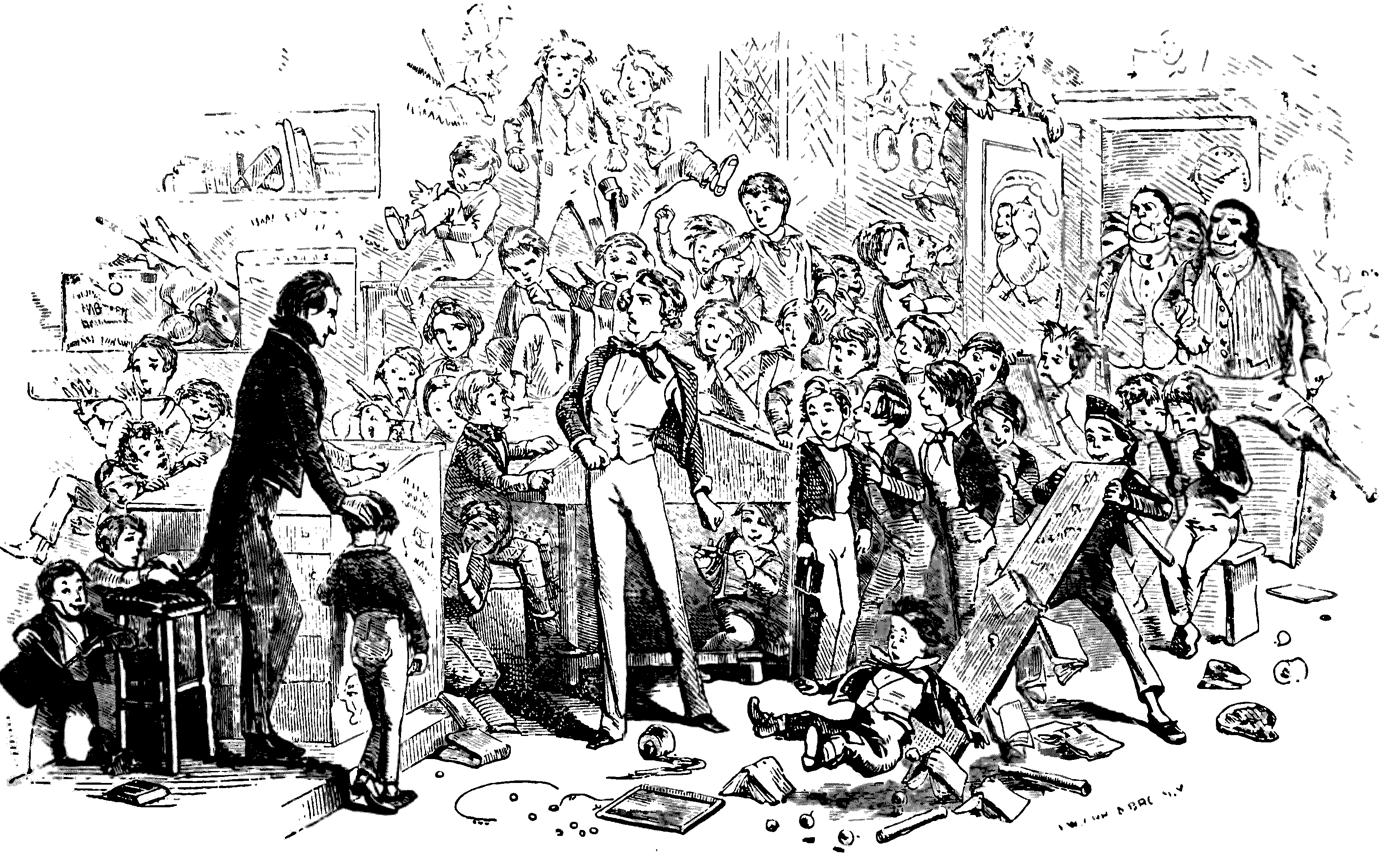
Mr Mell confronts Steerforth at Salem House school, by Phiz.

Steerforth shows no respect for the master Mr Mell, and is pleased to get him fired from his position by virtue of the power that comes to him from his mother's wealth and position.

=== In London ===
Several years later, after moving to London, David encounters Steerforth, and the two resume their friendship. Steerforth takes David to his home in Highgate and introduces him to his mother, Mrs Steerforth, and her companion, Miss Rosa Dartle, an eccentric young woman who resides with the mother at her home. Miss Dartle was Steerforth's carer when he was a boy, and the two have had a troubled relationship, as is seen from the scar on her lower lip which she received from Steerforth throwing a hammer at her.

=== In Yarmouth ===
David later invites Steerforth to Yarmouth to meet Daniel Peggotty, a fisherman who is the brother of his former housekeeper Clara Peggotty. The illustration by Phiz shows that David Copperfield is responsible for the intrusion of Steerforth into the Peggotty household on the night of Emily's engagement to Ham, and all that followed. During this visit, Steerforth catches sight of Dan's niece Emily (known by her family as "Little Em'ly"), and plans his seduction of her. Steerforth buys a boat and learns to sail from Mr Peggotty.

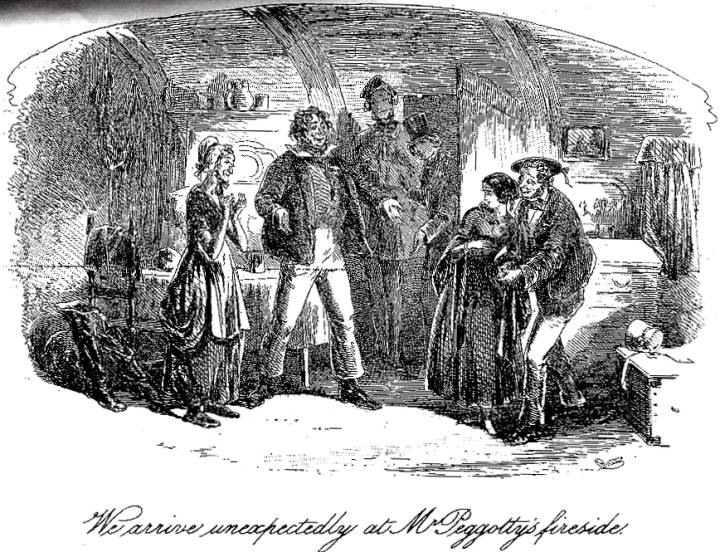
Steerforth and Copperfield arrive unexpectedly at the Peggotty home, by Phiz.

Some time later, after visiting Steerforth at his home a second time, David makes another trip to Yarmouth and learns to his great surprise and dismay that Emily has run off with Steerforth to live a life of luxury in Europe. This news greatly distresses both the Steerforth and Peggotty families, leading Mr Peggotty to meet Mrs Steerforth. He is unsuccessful in his quest to rescue Emily because of Mrs Steerforth's devotion to her son, and her snobbery causes her to scorn the Peggotty family.

Miss Dartle regards Emily as a seductress, while Mr Peggotty and his nephew Ham, who was Emily's fiancé, consider Steerforth to have stolen Emily from them. David never admits his own responsibility in this. Mr Peggotty leaves home on a quest to find his niece, searching throughout Europe for her. Eventually Emily returns to England, where she is found by her uncle. On leaving Emily in Europe Steerforth leaves his man Littimer to tell her of his decision. Littimer then offers to marry her, knowing her disgraced state. She has enough pride to flee him.

=== In the storm ===
A while later, David makes another visit to Yarmouth and is caught in the midst of a great storm. When he reaches Yarmouth, this storm has reached the peak of its ferocity. The storm causes a ship to be wrecked near the coast, with sailors stranded aboard. Eventually all but one lone sailor have been washed away. Ham sees this and attempts to board the ship to rescue the sailor. After reaching the ship, he and the sailor are crushed and killed by a strong wave. Their bodies are afterwards dragged ashore. The sailor whom Ham sought to rescue is found to be Steerforth; his death brings grief and shock to both his mother and Miss Dartle. David Copperfield knows what Steerforth has done, but his admiration for him is so great, that even in his reckless death, David recalls Steerforth as he was at Salem House school, relaxing and at his ease. At this point Miss Dartle confesses that she had always loved Steerforth and desired to be his wife; she angrily blames Steerforth's associates (including his mother) for having corrupted him and led him to his demise.

== Film and television portrayals ==
Year	Title	James Steerforth played by:
1935	David Copperfield	Hugh Williams
1956	David Copperfield	Anthony Tancred
1966	David Copperfield	Barry Justice
1969	David Copperfield	Corin Redgrave
1974	David Copperfield	Anthony Andrews
1986	David Copperfield	Jeremy Brudenell
1999	David Copperfield	Oliver Milburn/Harry Lloyd
2000	David Copperfield	Paul Bettany
2019	The Personal History of David Copperfield	Aneurin Barnard
