= Jeremy Brudenell =

British actor (born 1960)

- Born: Jeremy Alexander Rothwell Brudenell; 2 April 1960 (age 66); Hammersmith, London, England
- Occupation: Actor
- Years active: 1984–1999
- Spouse: Edwina Hicks (m. 1984; div. 2004)
- Children: 3

Jeremy Alexander Rothwell Brudenell (born 2 April 1960) is a retired British actor of the 1980s and 1990s.

== Early life ==
Jeremy Alexander Rothwell Brudenell was born in Hammersmith, London on 2 April 1960, the second son of physician John Michael Brudenell (1925-2015) and Mollie, née Rothwell.

== Acting career ==
He appeared as James Steerforth in David Copperfield (1986), Charles Warden in Fortunes of War (1987), Louis Bonaparte in Napoleon and Josephine: A Love Story (1987), Jean-Louis in Wish Me Luck (1990), Sebastian Pearce in The House of Eliott (1991), Ken Bernhard in The Bill (1993), Robert de Valicourt/Nicholas Ward in Highlander: The Series (1994–96), Bill Truscott in A Dance to the Music of Time (1997), Thaddeus Arnold in The Enid Blyton Secret Series (1997–98), and Father in Alice in Wonderland (1999). He also appeared in Massacre Play, a 1989 Italian thriller-drama film.

Brudenell's stage roles include Time and the Conways at the Churchill Theatre in Bromley (1988–89), The Circle at the Theatre Royal, Bath (1989–90), Venus Observed at the Chichester Festival Theatre (1991–92), Paul in Double Take at the Chichester Festival Theatre and the Minerva Theatre, Chichester (1992), and Edmund in King Lear at the Young Vic (1997).

== Later life ==
After professionally retiring from acting in 1999 Brudenell began a business career, and opened the 'Root One Garden Centre' in Wallingford, Oxfordshire.

== Personal life ==
Brudenell married Edwina Hicks, the eldest daughter of Lady Pamela Hicks and granddaughter of Lord Mountbatten of Burma, on 24 March 1984 at Christ Church Cathedral, Oxford, Oxfordshire, England. The couple had a son and two daughters before their divorce in 2004:

- Maddison May Brudenell (b. 16 May 1994), a model, married in 2015 Olaoluwa Modupe-Ojo. Brudenell and Modupe-Ojo separated in 2023 and Brudenell remarried in 2024 Bret Kapetanov; Brudenell has three children with Modupe-Ojo and one child with Kapetanov:
  - Daphne Modupe-Ojo (born on 26 November 2016)
  - Phebe Modupe-Ojo (born on 15 December 2018)
  - Moses Modupe-Ojo (born on 18 December 2020)
  - Michael Adam Kapetanov (born on 6 August 2024)
- Jordan Anne Brudenell (b. 1 July 1995), a freelancer. She graduated in graphic communication at Bath Spa University.
- Rowan Michael David Brudenell (b. 21 February 2001)
