= Paul Brightwell =

British actor

Paul Brightwell is an English actor and director. He has acted in many different plays, films and TV shows since the late 1980s. Theatre direction includes the British premieres of Heiner Muller's Hamletmachine at the Gate Notting Hill, and Witkiewicz's They at the Polish Theatre in Hammersmith.

== Career ==
Brightwell's first main role was as Uriah Heep in the TV Series David Copperfield in 1986. He went on to have parts in films and television shows, including Coronation Street.

In Titanic, Brightwell played Quartermaster Robert Hichens, the crew member who was at the ship's wheel at the time of RMS Titanic's impact with the iceberg which sank it.

Brightwell has guest starred in The Bill in a number of episodes. His longest recurring role is as DS Hall in the TV series, The Commander, which he has played throughout the 2000s. He also played the role of Malchus in the 2013 mini series The Bible, and Mr. Hickfang in the 2014 film The Voices.

== Filmography ==
Year	Title	Role	Notes
1986	David Copperfield	Uriah Heep	5 episodes
1990; 1993	Casualty	John Rowden; Pete	2 episodes
1997	Titanic	Quartermaster Hichens	Film
1998	Sliding Doors	Clive	Film
2000	Grange Hill	Mr. Xavier	7 episodes
1998; 2000	The Queen's Nose	Block/Black	3 episodes
1999	A Touch of Frost		
2001	Hornblower	Sergeant Whiting	2 episodes (films)
2001	EastEnders	D.I. Griffin	
2002; 2006	Ultimate Force	Sergeant Konchalovsky	1 episode
2004	Bad Girls	D.I. Ackroyd	2 episodes
2005	Kingdom of Heaven	Son of Roger de Cormier	Film (director's cut)
2017	Doctor Who	Surgeon	Episode: "World Enough and Time"
