= David Copperfield (1966 serial) =

1966 British TV series

- Radio Times cover with Christopher Guard
- Genre: Period drama
- Based on: David Copperfield by Charles Dickens
- Screenplay by: Vincent Tilsley
- Directed by: Joan Craft
- Starring: Ian McKellen; Tina Packer; Flora Robson; Gordon Gostelow; Christopher Guard
- Composer: John Hotchkis
- Country of origin: United Kingdom
- Original language: English
- No. of episodes: 13 (9 missing)

Production
- Producer: Campbell Logan
- Running time: 25 minutes

Original release
- Network: BBC 1
- Release: 16 January – 10 April 1966

David Copperfield is a BBC television serial starring Ian McKellen in the title role of the adaptation of Charles Dickens's 1850 novel that began airing in January 1966. It also featured Tina Packer as Dora, Flora Robson as Betsey Trotwood, Gordon Gostelow as Barkis, and Christopher Guard as young David. The screenplay adaptation was written by Vincent Tilsley, who had also written the screenplay for the 1956 adaptation almost a decade earlier.

It had a viewership of over 12 million for its initial airings. Only four of the serial's thirteen episodes (3, 8, 9 and 11) are known to exist. It is said to be remarkably similar to the 1956 adaptation that preceded it, although that version is now completely lost.

== Plot ==
For a detailed plot, see David Copperfield (novel).

== Cast ==
- Ian McKellen as David Copperfield
- Tina Packer as Dora Spenlow
- Flora Robson as Betsey Trotwood
- George Benson as Richard 'Mr Dick' Babley
- Hannah Gordon as Agnes Wickfield
- Lila Kaye as Peggotty
- Joss Ackland as Mr Peggotty
- Clive Francis as Tommy Traddles
- Noel Johnson as Mr Wickfield
- Bill Fraser as Mr Micawber
- Christopher Guard as David Copperfield (young)
- Colin Jeavons as Uriah Heep
- Gordon Gostelow as Barkis
- Barry Justice as James Steerforth
- Richard Leech as Mr Murdstone
- Olga Lindo as Mrs Gummidge
- Basil Moss as Ham Peggotty
- Judy Parfitt as Rosa Dartle
- Eleanor Summerfield as Mrs Micawber
- Elizabeth Tyrrell as Mrs Steerforth
- Amelia Bayntun as Mrs Crupp
- Mary Hinton as Clarissa Spenlow
- Nan Munro as Lavinia Spenlow
- Joan Peart as Jane Murdstone
- Dorothy Frere as Mrs Heep
- Sheila Shand Gibbs as Mrs Copperfield
- Lionel Hamilton as Mr Jorkins
- John Ringham as Littimer
- Angela Scoular as Emily
- André van Gyseghem as Mr Spenlow
- John Bryans as Mr Bellstruther
- Tony Caunter as Tungay
- Anton Darby as Long-legged boy
- Winifred Dennis as Publican's wife
- John Dunbar as Gamekeeper
- Geoffrey Edwards as Visitor
- Ian Ellis as Kemble
- John Falconer as Parson
- David J. Grahame as Beggar
- Stewart Guidotti as Mick Walker
- Larry Hamilton as Mealy Potatoes
- Robert Hartley as Mr Quinion
- Celia Hewitt as French lady
- Barbara Hicks as Mary Anne
- Hubert Hill as Passer-by
- Rikki Howson as Tinker
- Fred Hugh as Publican
- Brigit Paul as Housemaid
- Lloyd Pearson as Mr Gulpidge
- Danny Rae as Josh
- Michael Reynolds as Peel
- Gordon Richardson as Dr. Strong
- Barry Shawzin as Creakle
- Frank Summers as Topsawyer
- Sally Thomsett as Agnes Wickfield
- Suzanne Togni as Little Emily
- Patrick Troughton as Pawnbroker
- Allan Warren as Page
- Geoffrey Wearing as Man at Hotel
- Lynne White as Janet
- Penelope Windows as Sophy

== Archive status ==
After being rebroadcast in the late 1960s, the original master videotapes for all thirteen episodes were wiped by the BBC. The 16mm telerecordings made for preservation were junked sometime afterwards, most likely in the 1970s. Only four episodes (3 "A Long Journey", 8 "The Proposal", 9 "Domestic Tangles" and 11 "Umble Aspirations") are known to exist with the BFI, with episode 3 existing in the highest quality. Episodes 8, 9 and 11 suffer from notably lower sound and picture quality. Additionally, unedited studio footage of episode 3, featuring outtakes, mid-take conversations between actors and even director Joan Craft telling the crew to "shut up", is also held by the BFI and available for private viewing at their building on Stephen Street, London. All four episodes are available to view for free at their Southbank building via the Mediatheque service.

== Critical reception ==
The BFI's Screenonline wrote "while this adaptation is occasionally light in the playing (comic music punctuates some of Micawber's gesticulations), it doesn't avoid the novel's tough incidents, and its length allows an unusual faithfulness to incident and character (finding room for Traddles and others omitted from shorter adaptations)." Sir Ian McKellen himself later said, "I was new to television and got absorbed in the technicalities of it all: characterization was forced, I expect, and I'm very glad the original videotape has been destroyed."
