= David Copperfield (1974 serial) =

British TV serial (1974–1975)

Cover of German DVD

David Copperfield is a British six-part television serial of the 1850 novel by Charles Dickens adapted by Hugh Whitemore, directed by Joan Craft and first shown on BBC1 in weekly parts from 1 December 1974 to 5 January 1975. It was a co-production with Time-Life Television Productions. It is the earliest BBC adaptation to exist in its entirety. The 1956 adaptation is completely lost, whilst only four of the 1966 adaptation's episodes are known to exist.

== Cast ==
- Jonathan Kahn as David Copperfield (child)
- David Yelland as David Copperfield (adult)
- Martin Jarvis as Uriah Heep
- Arthur Lowe as Wilkins Micawber.
- David Troughton as Ham Peggotty
- Ian Hogg as Dan Peggotty
- Timothy Bateson as Mr Dick
- Patience Collier as Betsey Trotwood
- Anthony Andrews as Steerforth
- Patricia Routledge as Mrs Micawber
- Pat Keen as Peggotty

== Critical reception ==
This version was generally well received. In Clive James review for The Observer he wrote: "David Copperfield is as good as everybody says. Steerforth's flaw is well conveyed by Anthony Andrews, and Uriah Heep, played by Martin Jarvis, is a miracle of unction: to hear him talk is like stepping on a toad long dead. But Arthur Lowe's Micawber is better than anything. He follows W. C. Fields in certain respects, but is graciously spoken; and his gestures are as delicate as Oliver Hardy's. Not that his performance is eclectic - it is a subtle unity like everything he attempts."
