= Leonard Cracknell =

British actor (1941–1998)

Leonard Cracknell (20 January 1941 – 13 March 1998) was an English actor who worked in television, radio, film and theatre, mainly during the 1960s and 1970s.

He was raised in Hornchurch, London, England.

== Life ==
He first came to the attention of the British public in the late 1950s when he starred in one of the first BBC television costume dramas, the 1956 production of David Copperfield. He played the lead role as the young David Copperfield, appearing on the front cover of the Radio Times.

As his acting career developed, he starred in the BBC television soap opera 199 Park Lane, created in 1965. Another notable appearance came in The Terrornauts (1967), a cult science fiction movie about an alien invasion of the earth.

He was twice married, firstly to Rosemary, with whom he had one daughter; then to Sylvia, with whom he lived out his days in Southend-on-Sea, Essex.

== Acting career ==
- The Wednesday Play (2 episodes, 1964–1970)
- If There Weren't Any Blacks You'd Have to Invent Them (TV, 1960)
- The Terrornauts (1967)
- Dixon of Dock Green (3 episodes, 1959–66)
- Invasion (film, 1965)
- 199 Park Lane (TV, 1965)
- Liza of Lambeth (TV, 1965)
- Z-Cars (1 episode, 1964)
- No Hiding Place (1 episode, 1961)
- Sheep's Clothing (TV, 1960)
- Dead Lucky (1960)
- Volpone (TV, 1959)
- Julius Caesar (1959)
- David Copperfield (4 episodes, 1956)
