= Nolan Hemmings =

English stage and film actor

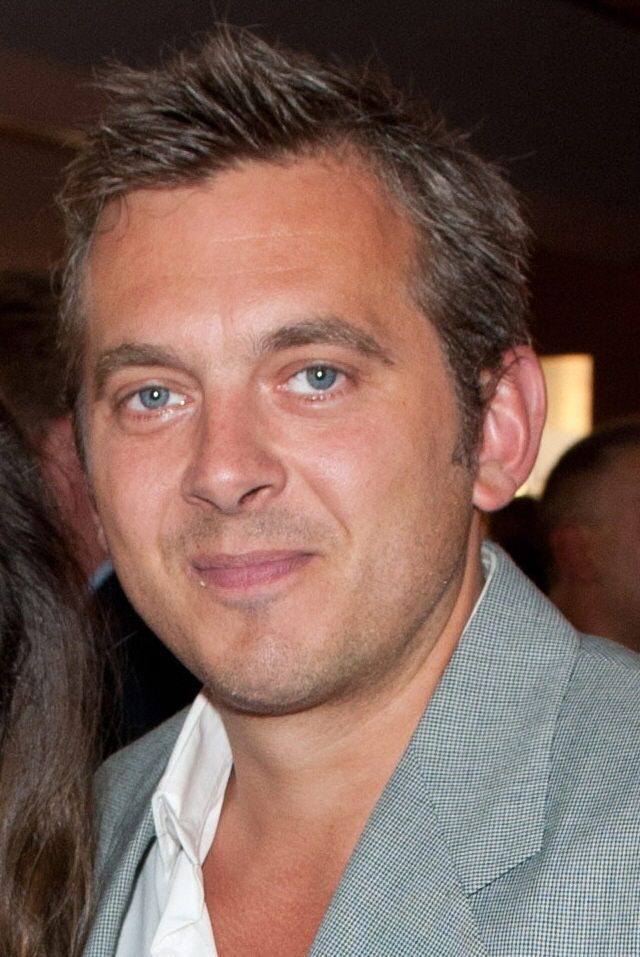
- Hemmings in 2013
- Born: 1970 (age 55–56)
- Occupation: Actor
- Years active: 1985–present
- Parent(s): David Hemmings; Gayle Hunnicutt

Nolan Hemmings (born 1970) is an English stage and film actor. He is known for his role as Charles E. Grant in Band of Brothers.

== Early life ==
Hemmings is the son of British actor/director David Hemmings and American actress Gayle Hunnicutt. He is named after his father's character, Captain Nolan, in The Charge of the Light Brigade.

== Career ==
An early appearance was as the young David in the 1986 BBC series David Copperfield.

In 1993 he appeared as Ensign Christopher Denny in Sharpe's Eagle, in the first series of Sharpe (TV Sharpe). He accompanied Sharpe and Harper when they broke through the French lines to capture the eagle, and was killed during the fighting. He may be most known worldwide for his portrayal of Staff Sergeant Charles 'Chuck' Grant in the HBO miniseries Band of Brothers. His character survived a gunshot to the head after the war ended while on occupation duty.

In the film Last Orders, he played a younger version of Lenny, his father David's character. He is also an actor in London's West End Theatre, and played vicar Jamie Flynn in Heartbeat (2006).
