= David Yelland (actor) =

English actor

- Occupation: Actor
- Years active: 1974–2020

David Yelland is an English film, stage and television actor.

== Life and career ==
After reading English at Cambridge, he began his career as an actor with three years at the Glasgow Citizens' Theatre. He has since appeared in numerous stage plays and television productions. Perhaps his most famous role was that of the future Edward VIII in the film Chariots of Fire.

He performed in the lead role of the BBC Television serial David Copperfield (1974), and is known for his portrayal of Nicholas Rumpole in the Thames Television series Rumpole of the Bailey, as the father of the main character in the London Weekend Television serial A Little Princess (1986), and for his role as a regular in ITV's Agatha Christie's Poirot as Poirot's valet, George. At the end of 2007 he played Ralph Nickleby in a revival of the play The Life and Adventures of Nicholas Nickleby, alongside his daughter, Hannah.

In 2016, Yelland played the role of Martin Bell in the BBC television film Reg.

== Selected filmography ==
Year	Title	Role	Notes
1974	David Copperfield	David Copperfield	TV series, 5 episodes
1975–1979	Rumpole of the Bailey	Nick Rumpole	TV series, 3 episodes
1979	Secret Army	Flight Lieutenant Alan Cox	TV series, Episode: "Ambush"
1981	Chariots of Fire	Prince of Wales	
1981	Othello	Cassio	TV movie
1982	Nancy Astor	David Astor	TV series, 2 episodes
1982	Spider's Web	Jeremy Warrender	TV film
1987	A Little Princess	Captain Crewe	TV series, 4 episodes
1989	Agatha Christie's Poirot	Laverton West	TV series, Episode: "Murder in the Mews"
2001	The Life and Adventures of Nicholas Nickleby		TV movie
2006	The Line of Beauty	John Timms	TV series, 2 episodes
2006–2013	Agatha Christie's Poirot	George	TV series, 7 episodes
2007, 2016	Midsomer Murders	TV series, 2 episodes	"Death and Dust" (ep. 56), James Kirkwood (2007); and "Harvest of Souls" (S18E6), Jasper Wyham (2016)
2010	Foyle's War	Sir Charles Devereaux	TV series, 1 episode: "The Hide"
2011	Coriolanus	TV Pundit	
2012	Private Peaceful	General Haig	
2016	The Crown	Commander Vyner	TV series, 1 episode: "Pride & Joy"
2017	Father Brown	Wilbur Lesser	TV series, 1 episode: "The Smallest of Things"
2017	Endeavour	Sir Merlyn Chubb	TV series, 1 episode: "Lazaretto"
2017	Happy End	Le directeur de la banque anglaise	
2018	Hunter Killer	SECDEF	
