= Dora Spenlow =

- David Copperfield character
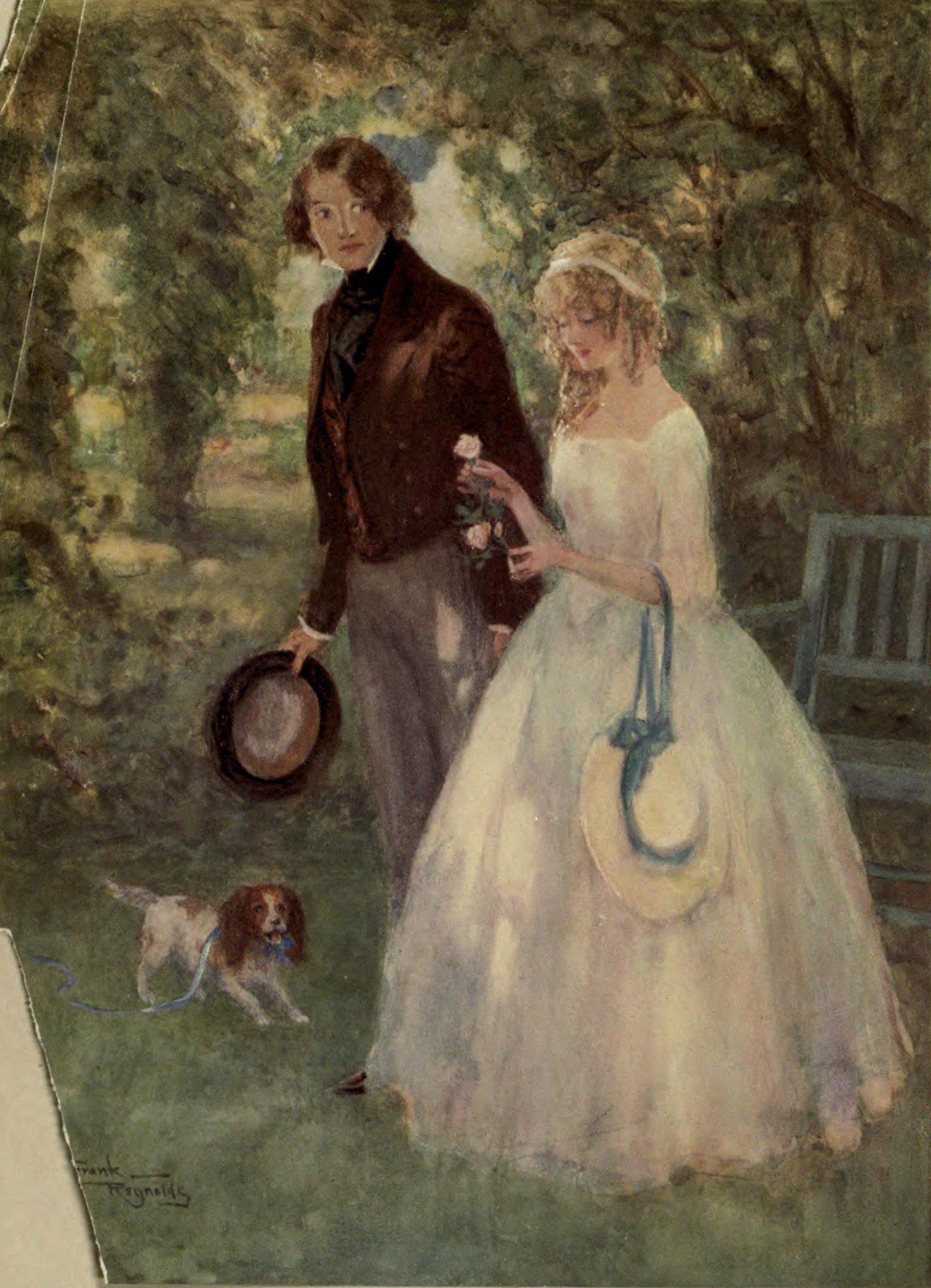
- David falls for Dora; Art by Frank Reynolds (1910)
- Created by: Charles Dickens

In-universe information
- Gender: Female
- Family: Francis Spenlow (father); Clarissa Spenlow (aunt); Lavinia Spenlow (aunt); David Copperfield (husband)
- Religion: Christianity
- Nationality: British

Dora Copperfield (née Spenlow) is a character in the 1850 novel David Copperfield by Charles Dickens. She is beautiful but childish. David, who is employed by her father, the lawyer Mr Spenlow, falls in love with Dora at first sight and marries her. She proves unable to cope with the responsibilities of married life and is more interested in playing with her dog, Jip, than in keeping their house. All this has a profound effect on David, but he still loves her. A year into their marriage, she suffers a miscarriage; her health steadily declines until she dies.

In 1830, Dickens met his first love, Maria Beadnell, thought to have been the model for the character Dora in David Copperfield. Maria's parents disapproved of the courtship and ended the relationship by sending her to school in Paris.

Charles Dickens named his daughter Dora Annie Dickens after the character on her birth in 1850, but she died the following year at the age of eight months.

== Portrayals ==
Dora has been portrayed by several actresses in numerous adaptations. She was first most notably depicted in the 1935 film adaptation by Maureen O'Sullivan. Pamela Franklin portrayed her in the 1969 adaptation, the first feature film depiction since the 1935 film, and the last for 50 years. Spenlow is played by Morfydd Clark in Armando Iannucci’s 2019 adaptation, The Personal History of David Copperfield. Dora's role in the film differs greatly from the novel, with Dora realising that she is not a good match for Copperfield and asking him to "write her out" of his story (the eponymous “Personal History”), so breaking off their engagement.

The BBC has adapted the novel four times. Dora was first portrayed in the 1956 adaptation by Sheila Shand Gibbs, although no recording of the production is thought to exist. Tina Packer played Dora in 1966. Only four episodes are known to exist, three of which (8, 9 and 11) feature Dora, including the character's miscarriage. She was depicted as more comically childlike in this version than most others, pronouncing her rs as ws in some scenes.

The first BBC adaptation still to exist entirely and the first one made in colour is the 1974 serial, where she is portrayed by Beth Morris. In the 1999 miniseries she is portrayed by Joanna Page.
