= Agnes Wickfield =

- David Copperfield character
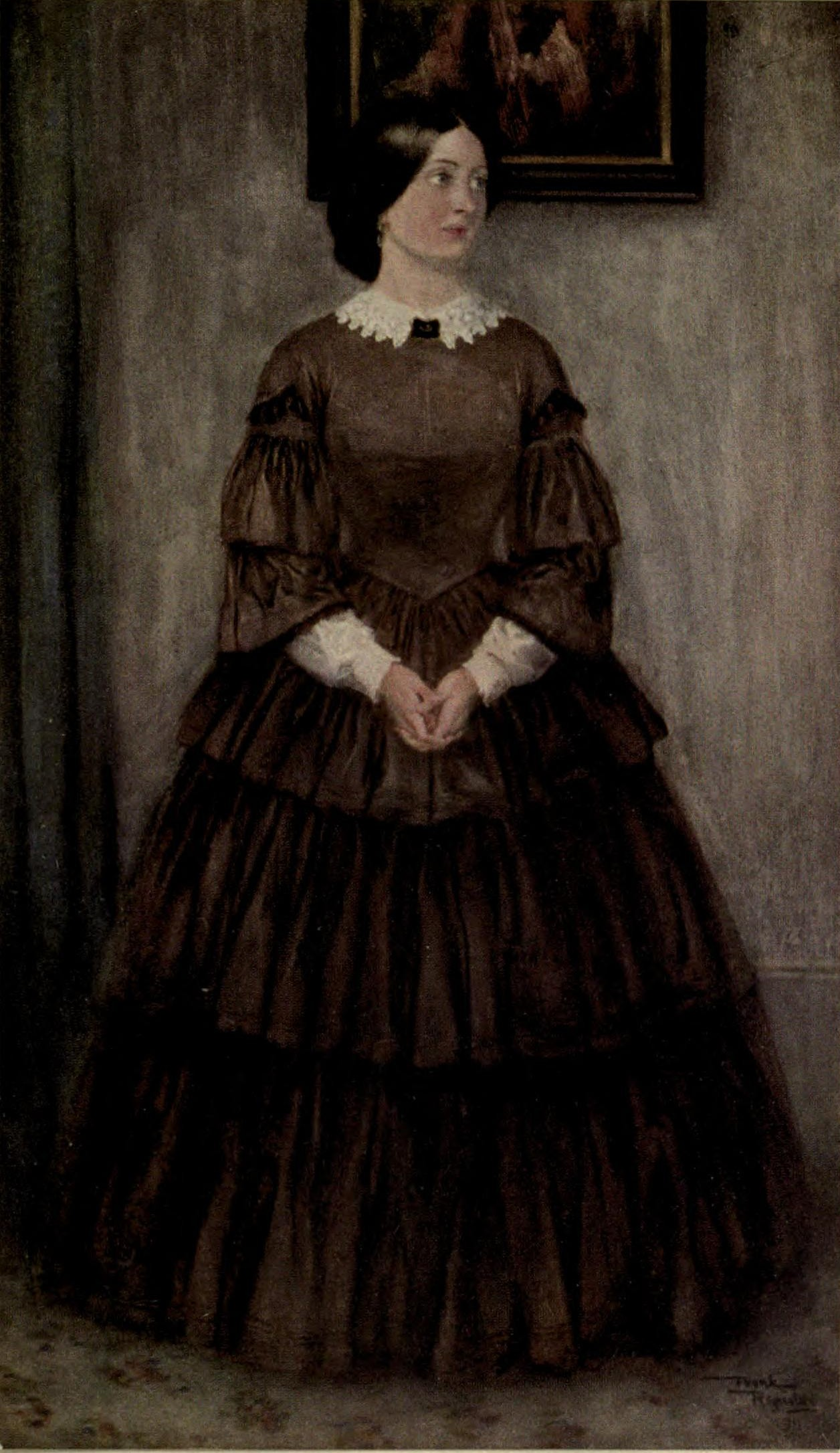
- Agnes Wickfield, David's second wife Art by Frank Reynolds (1910)
- Created by: Charles Dickens

In-universe information
- Gender: Female
- Family: Mr. Wickfield (father); David Copperfield (husband); At least five children, including two sons and three daughters
- Religion: Christianity
- Nationality: British

Agnes Wickfield is a character of David Copperfield, the 1850 novel by Charles Dickens. She is a friend and confidante of David (the narrator and protagonist of this semi-autobiography) since his childhood and at the end of the novel, his second wife. In Dickens' language, she is the "real heroine" of the novel.

== Role in the novel ==
Agnes is introduced in chapter 15 of the novel; when David, with his great-aunt Betsey Trotwood, goes to her father Mr. Wickfield's house in Canterbury, in search of a good school. Agnes, whose mother is dead, takes care of her alcoholic yet affectionate father and of the house, as the "little housekeeper". David takes residence in the house for his school-years. David and Agnes, being of same age; become best friends very quickly. Throughout his boyhood, David, in many ways, becomes dependent on Agnes. Agnes becomes his friend and confidante, and David regards her as a sister. Though Agnes loves him, she never tells him, knowing he doesn't have the same feelings for her.

After leaving the house when he passes school, David maintains close relations with Agnes. She warns him against his friend James Steerforth, as his "bad angel", which later proves true. Her father's villainous clerk, Uriah Heep, taking advantage of Mr. Wickfield's alcoholism and his affection for his daughter, becomes powerful. He becomes a partner in the law firm by devious means and wants Agnes' hand in marriage. Agnes, refusing, resists Heep throughout the years. Hiding her true feelings for David, she helps and advises him in his infatuation with and marriage to Dora Spenlow. Later, when Wilkins Micawber is recruited as a clerk by Heep, she urges him to gather evidence against Heep; this ultimately leads to Heep's downfall.

After Dora's death, Agnes consoles and encourages David to return to his normal life, and the profession of writing. While living in Switzerland, David realizes that he loves Agnes. After returning to England he tries hard to conceal his feelings, but realizing Agnes loves him as well, he proposes to her; she accepts. They marry quickly and take residence in London. Agnes bears David at least five children.

== Character analysis ==
Like typical Dickensian heroines, Agnes is mainly a passive character, an ideal Victorian lady. Her characterization is often criticized as "too perfect". David often describes her as an angel.

Recent researches have been more favorable to her. Cultural historian Peter Gay in an article titled "The Legless Angel of 'David Copperfield': There's More to Her Than Victorian Piety" stated that, she shows the effects of parentification. The death of her mother and alcoholism and weak-mindedness of her father makes her more matured for her age, along with gifts of intelligence and presence of mind.

One significant feature of Agnes' character is her calm, quiet and tranquil nature. David's first impression about her is comparing her to a "stained glass window" of a church. David often compares Agnes with the tranquil brightness of the church-window.

Agnes' character was based on Dickens' sisters-in-law Mary and Georgina Hogarth, both of whom were very close to Dickens. Mary died in 1837 at the age of 17, and Georgina, from 1842, lived with the Dickens family. Dickens referred to her affectionately as his "little housekeeper". After Dickens' separation from his wife Catherine, Georgina stayed with him for the rest of his life and took complete responsibility for managing his household.

Lettice Cooper has suggested that Angela Georgina Burdett-Coutts may also have influenced Dickens in the creation of Agnes.
