= Wilkins Micawber =

Fictional character from David Copperfield by Charles Dickens

- David Copperfield character
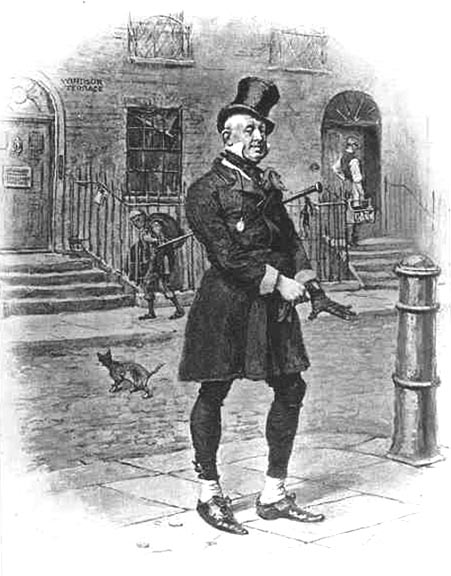
- As illustrated in a 1912 edition of the book
- Created by: Charles Dickens
- Based on: John Dickens (Dickens's father)

In-universe information
- Gender: Male
- Occupation: Various
- Nationality: British

Wilkins Micawber is a fictional character in Charles Dickens's 1850 novel David Copperfield. He is traditionally identified with the optimistic belief that "something will turn up."

== His role in the story ==
Micawber was incarcerated in debtors' prison (the King's Bench Prison) after failing to meet his creditors' demands. His long-suffering wife, Emma, stands by him despite his financial exigencies that force her to pawn all of her family's heirlooms. She lives by the maxims, "I will never desert Mr. Micawber!" and "Experientia does it!" (from Experientia docet, "One learns by experience.")

Micawber is responsible for a major financial setback to another character. The hardworking, reliable Tommy Traddles, who is saving to furnish a home for the young woman he hopes to marry, allows his optimism to overcome his common sense. He "lends his name" to Micawber by co-signing for his rent, and when Micawber fails to pay, Micawber's creditors seize all of the Micawber family's furniture and personal effects, along with those of Traddles. Although Traddles eventually recovers the little round table and flower pot that symbolize his hopes for future happiness, he hampers himself financially by paying off Micawber's debt.

Micawber is hired as a clerk by the scheming Uriah Heep, who assumes wrongly that Micawber's debts arise from dishonesty. But working for Heep allows Micawber to expose his boss as a forger and a cheat. To start anew, Micawber and his family emigrate to Australia with Daniel Peggotty and Little Em'ly, where Micawber becomes manager of the Port Middlebay Bank and a successful government magistrate. Prior to leaving, Micawber repays the money Traddles spent settling his loan.

In Hablot Knight Browne's illustrations for the first edition, Micawber is shown wearing knee-breeches, a top hat, and a monocle. Micawber was modelled on Dickens' father, John Dickens.

== Popular culture ==
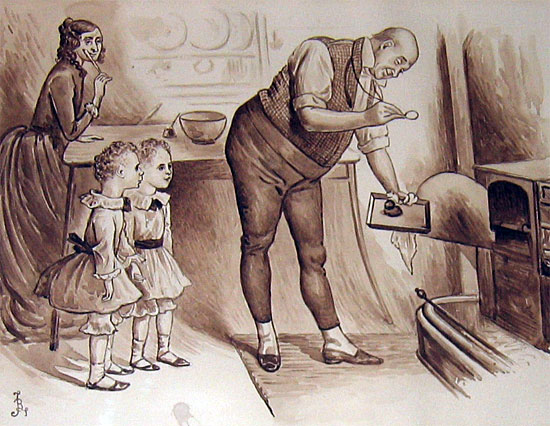
As illustrated by Fred Barnard in an 1870s edition

Micawber is known for asserting his faith that "something will turn up." His name has become synonymous with someone who lives in hopeful expectation. This has formed the basis for the Micawber Principle, based upon his observation in Chapter 12:

Annual income twenty pounds, annual expenditure nineteen nineteen and six, result happiness. Annual income twenty pounds, annual expenditure twenty pounds nought and six, result misery.

Written in full, the expenditure amounts are nineteen pounds, nineteen shillings and sixpence (£19/19/6) and £20/0/6, the pre-decimal equivalents of £19.97 1/2 and £20.02 1/2 in modern British currency.

The character was played by W.C. Fields in the 1935 screen classic, Personal History, Adventures, Experience, and Observation of David Copperfield the Younger. Bob Hoskins took the role in a 1999 BBC serial. Peter Capaldi played Micawber in the 2019 Armando Iannucci film The Personal History of David Copperfield.

Keith Richards of the Rolling Stones named one of his guitars (an early 1950s Fender Telecaster with a Gibson PAF humbucking pickup installed in the neck position) "Micawber"; Richards is known to be a fan of Dickens. "There's no reason for my guitar being called Micawber, apart from the fact that it's such an unlikely name. There's no one around me called Micawber, so when I scream for Micawber everyone knows what I'm talking about."

The character formed the basis of Micawber, a 2001 ITV drama series written by John Sullivan and starring David Jason in the title leading role. In the U.S. Supreme Court opinion of Bell Atlantic Corp. v. Twombly, 550 U.S. 544, 562 (2007), Justice Souter criticized the court for an approach to pleading that "would dispense with any showing of a reasonably founded hope that a plaintiff would be able to make a case; Mr. Micawber's optimism would be enough."

== Entry into general English ==
The character of Wilkins Micawber has given rise to the English noun "Micawber" and the adjectives "Micawberish" and "Micawberesque." The Merriam-Webster Dictionary defines a Micawber as "one who is poor but lives in optimistic expectation of better fortune." Judge David Halpern described Craig Whyte's legal arguments as "pure Micawberism" in a 2013 case regarding Whyte's ill-fated ownership of Rangers F.C., for example.

== Film and television portrayals ==
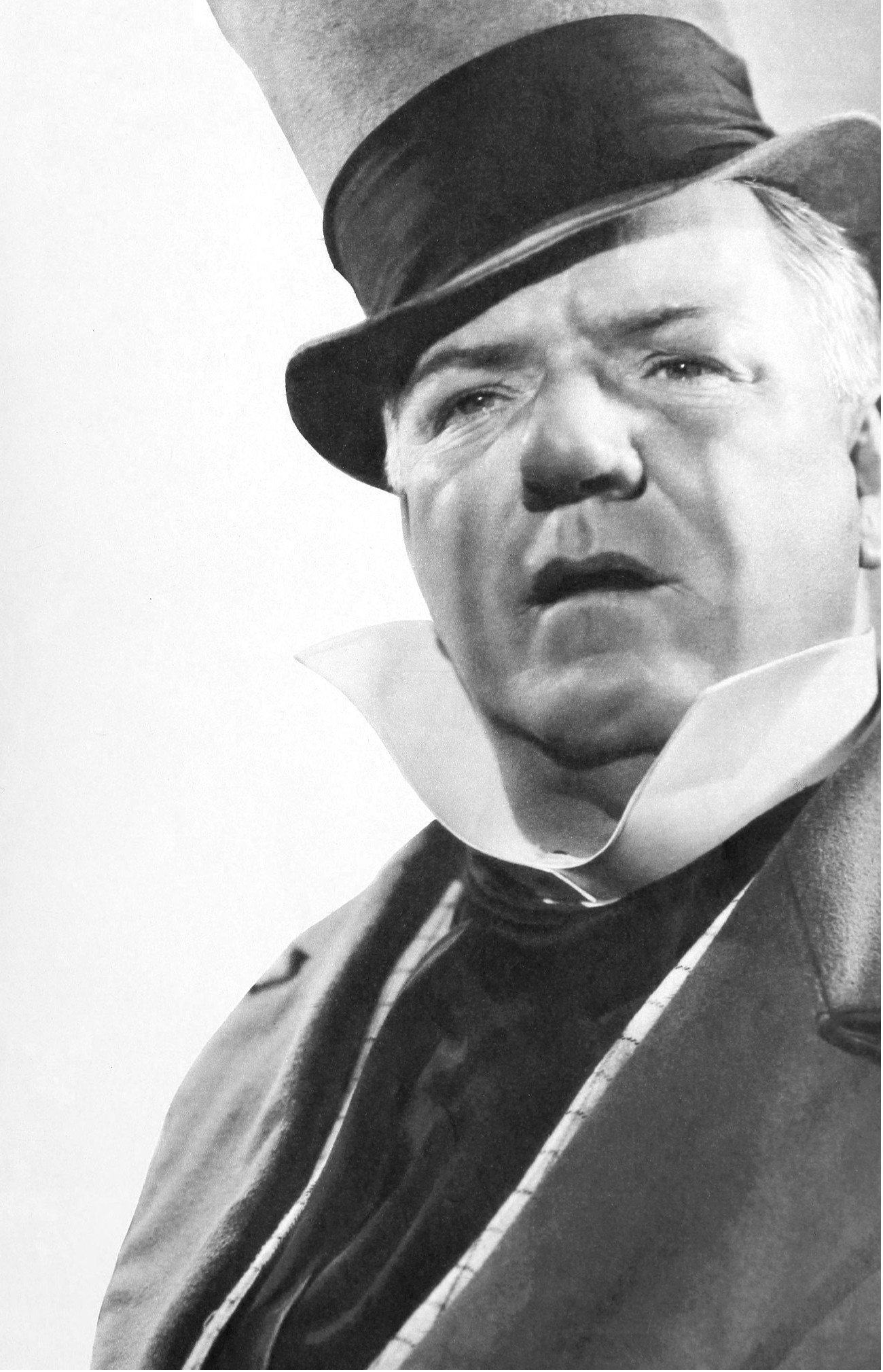
W. C. Fields in his famous role as Mr. Micawber

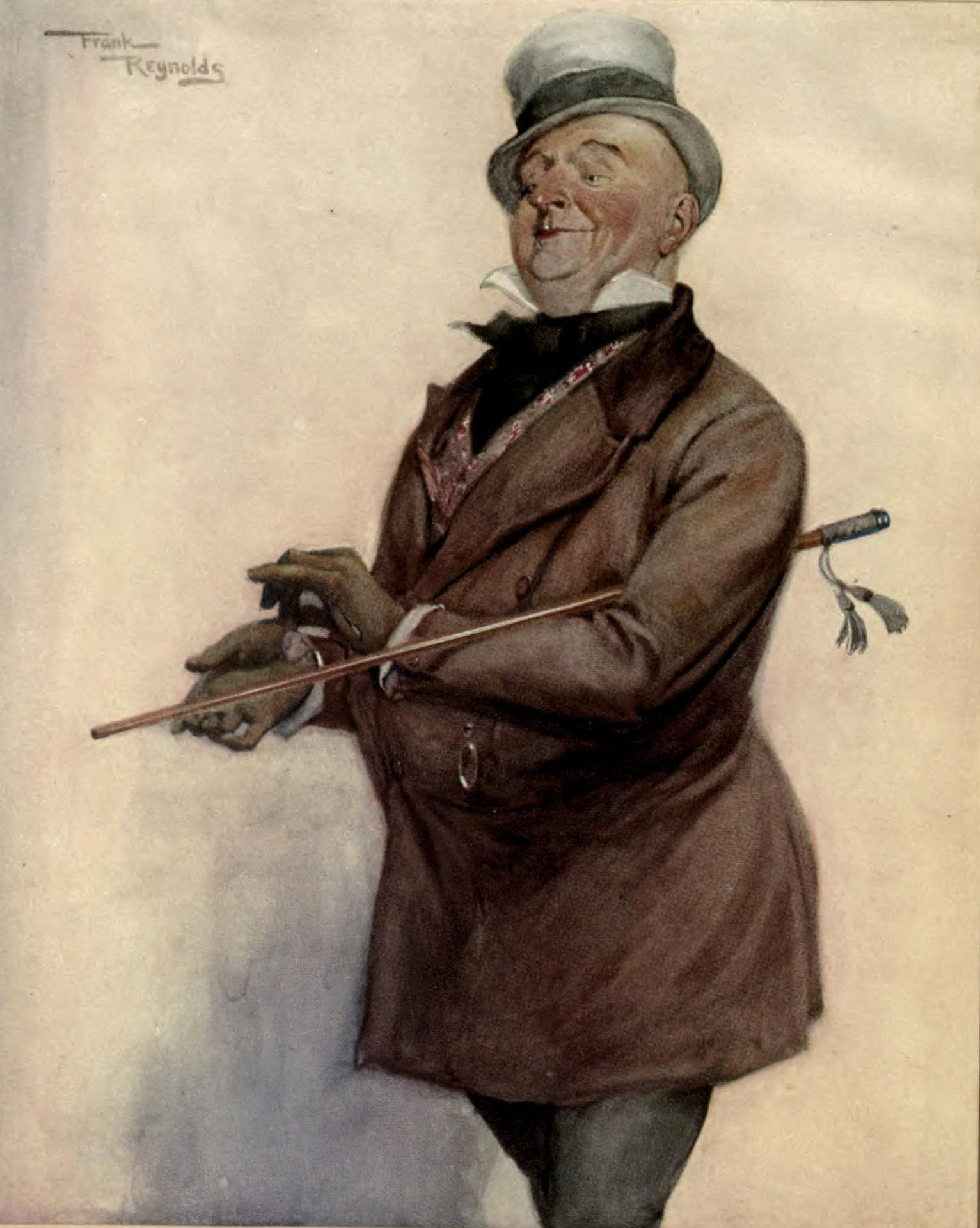
Art by Frank Reynolds.

Year	Title	Wilkins Micawber played by:
1935	David Copperfield	W.C. Fields
1956	David Copperfield	Hilton Edwards
1966	David Copperfield	Bill Fraser
1969	David Copperfield	Ralph Richardson
1974	David Copperfield	Arthur Lowe
1993	David Copperfield	Joseph Marcell
1999	David Copperfield	Bob Hoskins
2000	David Copperfield	Michael Richards
2002	Micawber	David Jason
2019	The Personal History of David Copperfield	Peter Capaldi

=== Quotations from the 1935 film ===
- Boy, as I have frequently had occasion to observe: "When the stomach is empty, the spirits are low!"
- Remember my motto "Nil Desperandum! -Never despair!"

=== Quotation from the BBC TV/Masterpiece Theatre production ===
- (featuring Bob Hoskins as Micawber) "I could not depart this metropolis without paying a valedictory visit to my dear friend Copperfield, in whose debt I shall forever remain (I speak metaphorically of course!)"

== General and cited reference ==
- Bloom, Harold (1992). David Copperfield (Major Literary Characters Series). New York: Chelsea House Publishers.
- Hawes, Donald (2002). Who's Who in Dickens. 2nd. ed. London: Routledge
- Oddie, W. (1967). "Mr. Micawber and the redefinition of experience." The Dickensian 63:109.
