= Betsey Trotwood =

- David Copperfield character
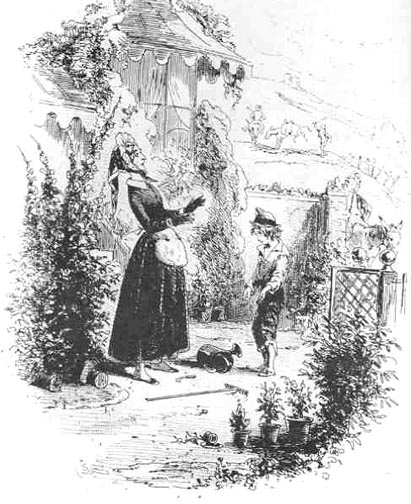
- 'I make myself known to my aunt' Illustration by Hablot Knight Browne
- Created by: Charles Dickens

In-universe information
- Gender: Female
- Family: David Copperfield (great nephew)
- Nationality: British

Betsey Trotwood is a fictional character from Charles Dickens' 1850 novel David Copperfield.

== Role in novel ==
Betsey Trotwood is David Copperfield's great-aunt on his father's side, and has an unfavourable view of men and boys, having been ill-used and abandoned by a worthless husband earlier in life. She appears in the novel's first chapter, where she demonstrates her uncommon personality and her dislike of boys when she storms out of the house after hearing that David's mother has had a son, rather than the daughter to whom Trotwood intended to be the godmother.

Betsey plays a bigger role in David's later life by taking him in after he has run away from labelling wine bottles in the factory in Blackfriars where his stepfather, Edward Murdstone, had placed him to work after the death of David's mother. She provides him with a place at a good school in Canterbury and opportunities for a career in Doctors' Commons, thus showing her complex character.

== Origin ==
The character is based on Miss Mary Pearson Strong who lived at Broadstairs, Kent, and who died on 14 January 1855; she is buried in the Nuckell family plot in St. Peter's-in-Thanet churchyard. Strong was born in Erlestoke, Wiltshire, in 1768. In 1799 her sister Anne married Stephen Nuckell, a prominent tailor and bookseller in Broadstairs from around 1796 to 1822, Anne was his second wife. Mary Pearson Strong inherited 2 Nuckell's Place (subsequently renamed Dickens House, Victoria Parade) on the passing of Stephen Nuckell (1834) and Anne Nuckell (1842).

By the time of Anne's death Charles Dickens was already taking regular holidays in Broadstairs and would come to know Mary Pearson Strong well, regularly taking tea together. Dickens also witnessed the Broadstairs 'donkey wars' as they were later termed, with Strong chasing donkeys from the hallowed lawn in front of her house, a spectacle which became a feature of his novel David Copperfield.

Mary Pearson Strong's home now hosts Broadstairs' Dickens House Museum.

== Legacy ==
There is a public house in Clerkenwell, Central London, called The Betsey Trotwood. Owned by the Shepherd Neame Brewery, it adopted the name in 1983, having previously been The Butcher's Arms.

The city of Trotwood, Ohio is named after the character.

== Film and television portrayals ==
Year	Title	Betsey Trotwood played by:
1911	David Copperfield	Viola Alberti
1935	David Copperfield	Edna May Oliver
1969	David Copperfield	Edith Evans
1986	David Copperfield	Brenda Bruce
1993	David Copperfield	Andrea Martin
1999	David Copperfield	Maggie Smith
2000	David Copperfield	Sally Field
2019	The Personal History of David Copperfield	Tilda Swinton
