= Frank Reynolds (artist) =

British artist (1876–1953)

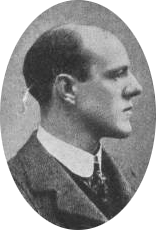
- Frank Reynolds, c. 1909
- Born: 13 February 1876; Hammersmith
- Died: 18 April 1953 (aged 77); The Chapel at Former Holloway Sanatorium Virginia Water
- Alma mater: Heatherley School of Fine Art
- Occupation: Illustrator, editor

Frank Reynolds (13 February 1876 – 18 April 1953) was a British artist. Son of an artist, he studied at Heatherley's School of Art. His work was part of the painting event in the art competition at the 1928 Summer Olympics.

== Biography ==
Frank Reynolds was born in Hammersmith, London on 13 February 1876. He had a drawing called A provincial theatre company on tour published in The Graphic on 30 November 1901. In 1906, he began contributing to Punch magazine and was regularly published within its pages during World War I, noted for his anti-Kaiser illustrations in Punch. A collection of 199 of his illustrations is in the Punch archives.

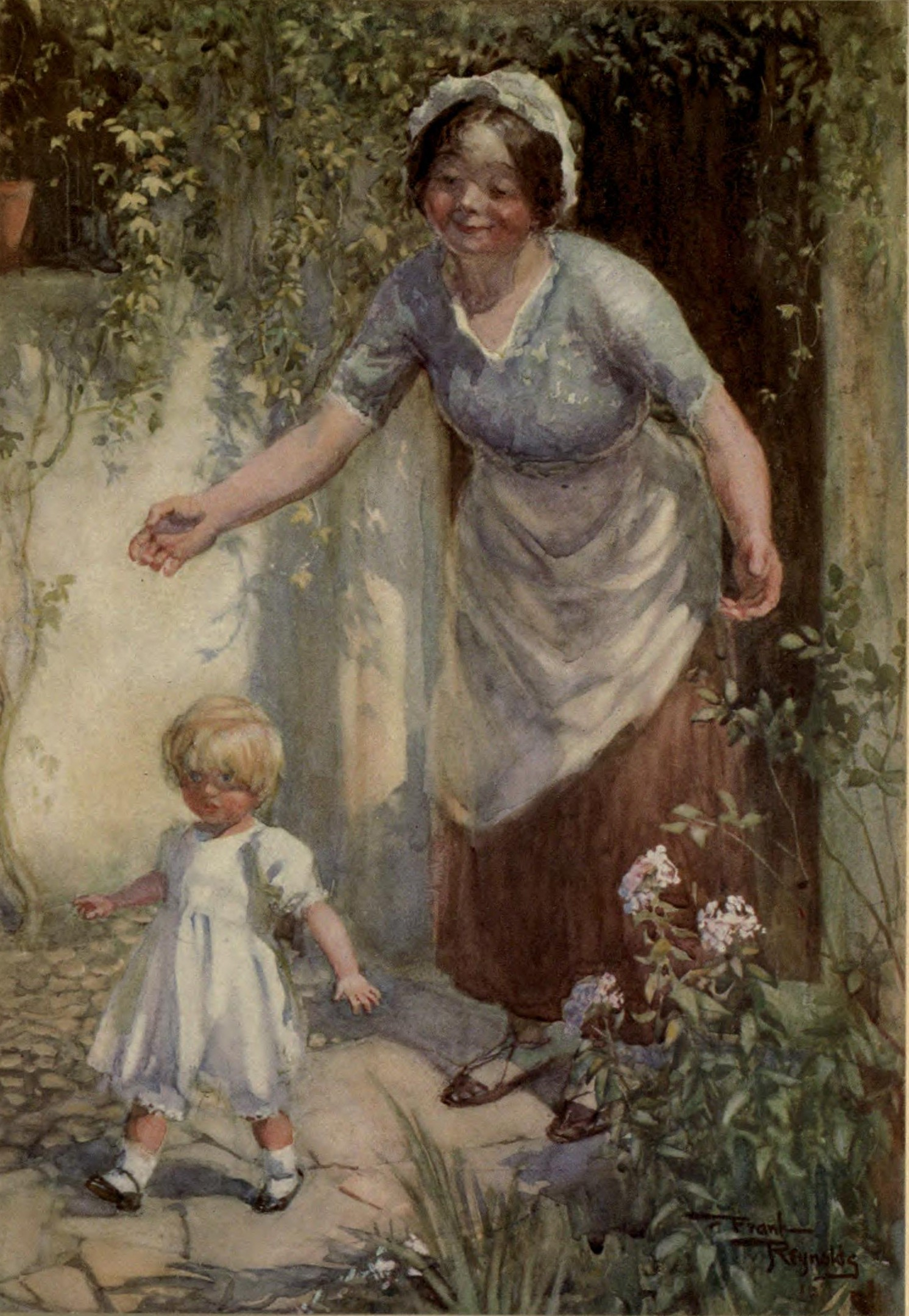
Peggotty and young David Copperfield, art by Frank Reynolds 1911

He was well known for his many illustrations in several books by Charles Dickens, including David Copperfield (c. 1911), The Pickwick Papers (c. 1912) and The Old Curiosity Shop (c. 1913). He succeeded F. H. Townsend as the art editor for Punch.

Reynolds was one of the leading illustrators selected by Percy Bradshaw for inclusion in his The Art of the Illustrator (1917-1918) which presented a separate portfolio for each of twenty illustrators. (Note: The portfolio contained: a brief biography of Reynolds, an illustration of Reynolds at work in his studio, an explanation of Reynolds's method of working. This was accompanied by a plate showing an illustration typical of his work and five other plates showing the work at five earlier stages of its production, from the first rough to the just before the finished drawing or colour sketch. Reynolds's illustration shows a disgruntled traveller accompanied by his wife and child.) He was also a prolific watercolour painter and was a member of the Royal Institute of Painters in Water Colours from 1903. He continued to illustrate in black and white or in colours all his life. He became known in the 1930s and through the Second World War for characters called The Bristlewoods.

One of his more notable works is entitled Jingle.

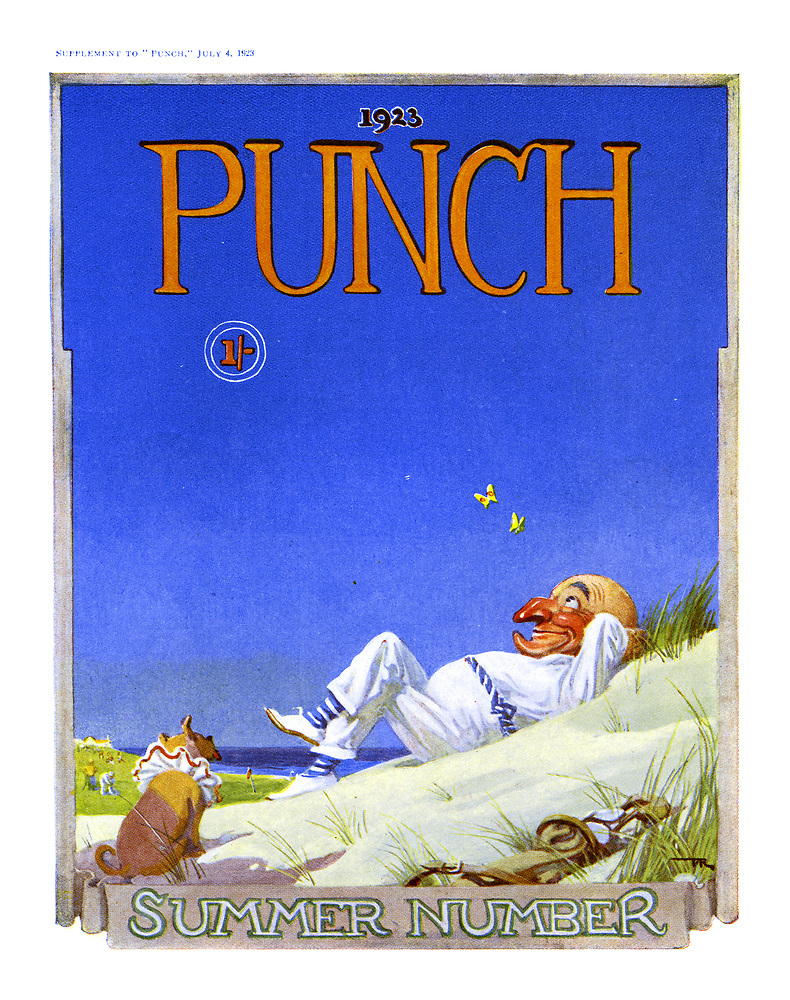
Reynolds cover for Punch magazine's Summer Number, 1923

His journal contributions included

- London Magazine
- The Sketch
- Punch
- Windsor Magazine
- The Illustrated London News

He died from pneumonia at Holloway Sanatorium in Surrey on 18 April 1953.
