= Uriah Heep (David Copperfield) =

Fictional character created by Charles Dickens in his novel David Copperfield

- David Copperfield character
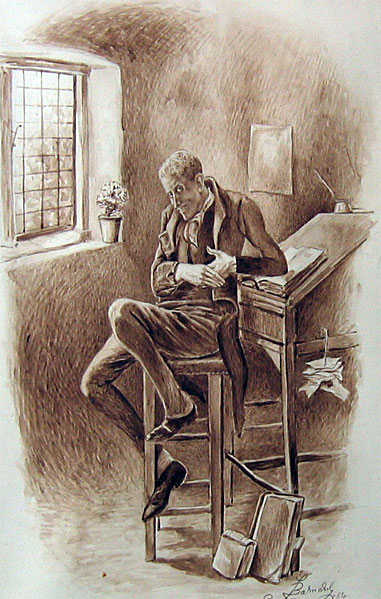
- Drawing by Fred Barnard
- Created by: Charles Dickens

In-universe information
- Gender: Male
- Occupation: Clerk
- Family: Mrs. Heep (mother)
- Nationality: British

Uriah Heep is a fictional character created by Charles Dickens in his 1850 novel David Copperfield. Heep is the primary antagonist during the second part of the novel. His character is notable for his sycophancy.

== In the novel ==
David first meets the 15-year-old Heep when he comes to live with Mr. Wickfield and his daughter Agnes.

Uriah is a law clerk working for Mr. Wickfield. He realises that his widowed employer has developed a severe drinking problem and turns it to his advantage. Uriah encourages Wickfield's drinking, tricks him into thinking he has committed financial wrongdoing while drunk, and blackmails him into making Uriah a partner in his law office. He admits to David (whom he hates) that he intends to manipulate Agnes into marrying him.

Uriah miscalculates when he hires Mr. Micawber as a clerk, assuming Micawber will never risk his own financial security by exposing Uriah's transgressions. Yet Micawber is honest, and he, David, and Tommy Traddles confront Uriah with proof of his frauds. They let Uriah go free only after he had (reluctantly) agreed to resign his position and return the money that he had stolen.

Later in the novel, David encounters Uriah for the last time. In prison for bank fraud and awaiting transportation, Uriah acts like a repentant model prisoner. However, in conversation with David, he reveals himself to remain full of malice.

== Origins ==
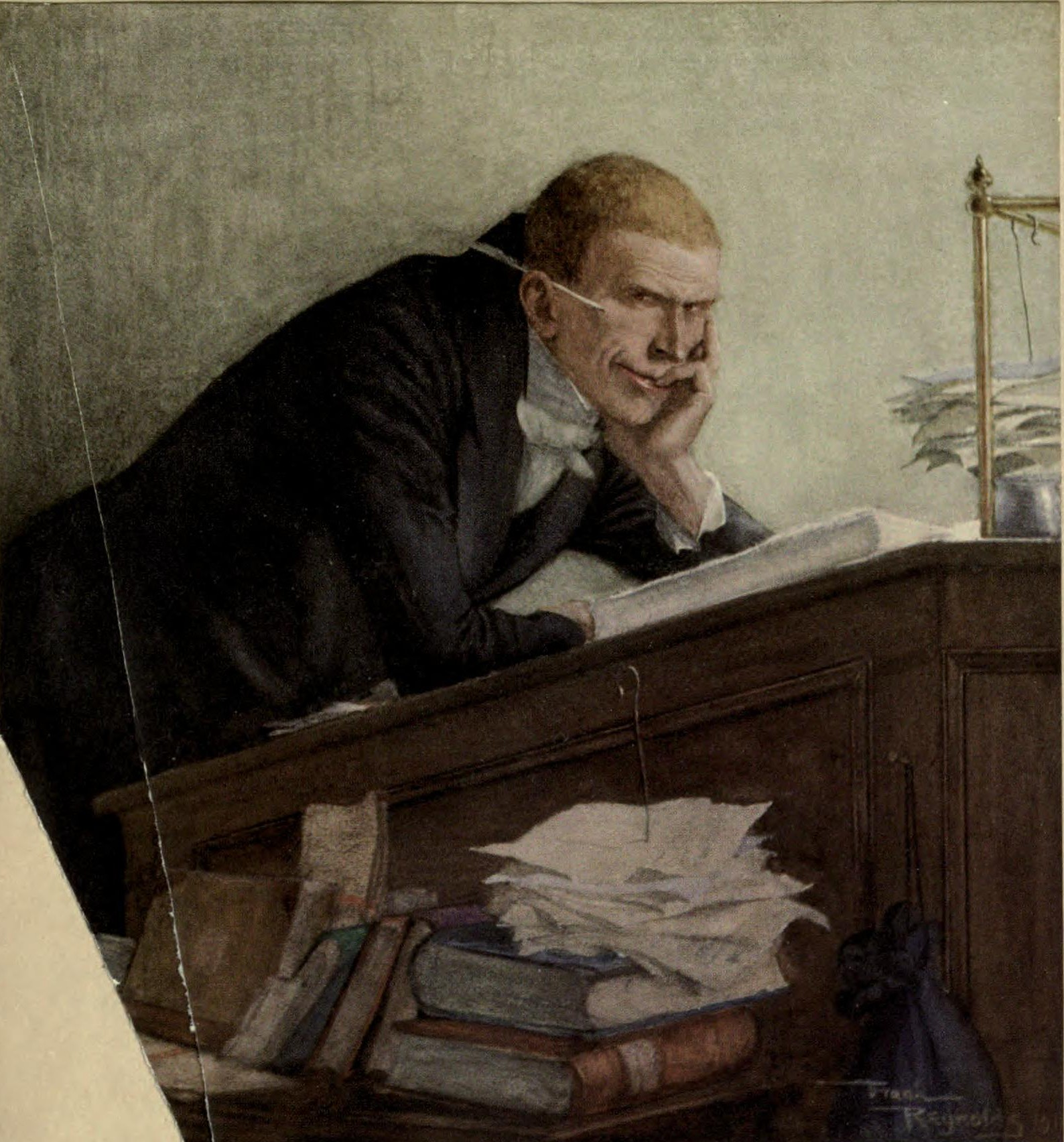
Artwork of Uriah Heep by Frank Reynolds (1910)

Much of David Copperfield is autobiographical, and some scholars believe Heep's mannerisms and physical attributes to be based on Hans Christian Andersen, whom Dickens met shortly before writing the novel. Uriah Heep's schemes and behaviour could also be based on Thomas Powell, an employee of Thomas Chapman, a friend of Dickens'. Powell "ingratiated himself into the Dickens household" and was discovered to be a forger and a thief, having embezzled £10,000 from his employer. He later attacked Dickens in pamphlets, calling particular attention to Dickens' social class and background.

== Film and television ==
In film and television adaptations, the character has been played by Peter Paget (1934), Roland Young (1935), Maxwell Shaw (1956), Colin Jeavons (1966), Ron Moody (1969), Martin Jarvis (1974), Paul Brightwell (1986), Nicholas Lyndhurst (1999), Frank MacCusker (2000), Ben Whishaw (2019) and Benedict Hardie (2026).

== Rock band ==
The British rock band Uriah Heep is named after the character.
