= Dickens of London =

1976 television miniseries

Dickens of London DVD cover

Dickens of London is a 1976 television miniseries from Yorkshire Television based on the life of English novelist Charles Dickens. Both Dickens and his father John were played by British actor Roy Dotrice. The series was written by Wolf Mankowitz and Marc Miller. In the United States, the series was shown in 1977.

The series of 13 episodes of 60 minutes was directed by Michael Ferguson (6 episodes) and Marc Miller (7 episodes), who was also the series' producer, with David Cunliffe as executive producer. Mankowitz's book, Dickens of London, published by Weidenfeld and Nicolson in 1976, was based on the detailed research he made while writing the screenplay.

== Background ==
Each of the 13 episodes of Dickens of London is a flashback, with Charles Dickens (Roy Dotrice), by now an internationally famous novelist, in America during a reading tour of 1869, looking back over his life. Dickens the boy (Simon Bell) is shown unhappily pasting labels onto pots of shoe blacking, while Dickens as a young man (Gene Foad) is revealed as a genius who is becoming aware of his powers and trying to find his way in the world. Mary Hogarth (Lois Baxter) is the middle one of the three Hogarth daughters and is portrayed as the one person with whom Dickens seems to have been able to share his work. She dies suddenly aged seventeen and Dickens wears her ring on his little finger for the rest of his life. Georgina Hogarth (Christine McKenna), the youngest of the three Hogarth daughters, comes to live with the couple to help run the household, at the request of her oldest sister Catherine Dickens. The relationship Dickens developed with the young actress Ellen Ternan is not mentioned in the series, nor is Dickens' separation from his wife, Catherine, in 1858. The series is mainly concerned with the influence upon Dickens of his improvident father, John Dickens (Roy Dotrice), who was a Naval clerk and who always spent more than he earned. He is portrayed as an alcoholic and it is suggested that this was the source of the family's financial difficulties. The script includes passages from Dickens' works, woven into the dialogue, creating signposts for readers of Dickens' work.

== Episodes ==
- Episode 1: Mask (broadcast 28 September 1976)
- Episode 2: The Deed (broadcast 5 October 1976)
- Episode 3: Blacking (broadcast 12 October 1976)
- Episode 4: Love (broadcast 19 October 1976)
- Episode 5: Success (broadcast 26 October 1976)
- Episode 6: Fame (broadcast 2 November 1976)
- Episode 7: Money (broadcast 9 November 1976)
- Episode 8: Possession (broadcast 16 November 1976)
- Episode 9: Dreams (broadcast 23 November 1976)
- Episode 10: Magic (broadcast 30 November 1976)
- Episode 11: Nightmare (broadcast 7 December 1976)
- Episode 12: Angel (broadcast 14 December 1976)
- Episode 13: Memories (broadcast 21 December 1976)

== Cast ==
- Roy Dotrice as Charles and John Dickens
- Diana Coupland as Elizabeth Dickens
- Adrienne Burgess as Catherine Dickens
- Gene Foad as Charles Dickens as a young man
- Lois Baxter as Mary Hogarth
- Simon Bell as Charles Dickens as a boy
- Paul Nelson as Bob Fagin
- Graham Faulkner as Frederick Dickens
- Holly Palance as Miss Baldwin
- Trevor Bowen as John Forster
- Robert Longden as Hablot Knight Browne
- Lynsey Baxter as Orfling
- Paul Lavers as James Lamert
- Michael Macowan as Sir Giles
- Claire McLellan as Letitia Dickens
- Pheona McLellan as Fanny Dickens as a child
- George Waring as Huffam
- Karen Dotrice as Maria Beadnell
- Derek Francis as Stage Manager
- Raymond Francis as Mr. Beadnell
- Robin Halstead as Kolle
- Richard Hampton as Daniel Maclise
- William Hoyland as Count Alfred d'Orsay
- Patsy Kensit as Young Georgina Hogarth
- Christine McKenna as Adult Georgina Hogarth
- Ben Kingsley as Dr. John Elliotson
- Richard Leech as Mr. Hogarth
- Anthony May as Hullah
- John Nettles as Mr. Macrone
- Vernon Dobtcheff as Legal Gentleman
- Connie Booth as Sophie
- David Healy as Commissioner Wentworth
