= Alfred Lamert Dickens =

English railway engineer (1822–1860)

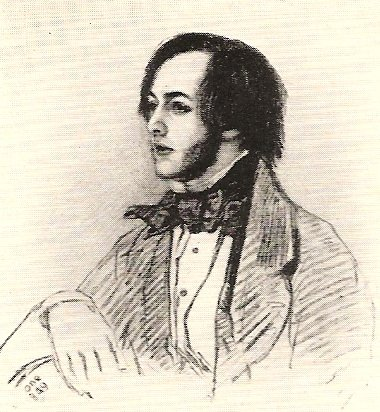
- Born: March 1822; London, England
- Died: 27 July 1860 (aged 38); Manchester, England
- Resting place: Highgate Cemetery
- Occupation: Railway engineer
- Known for: Brother of novelist Charles Dickens
- Spouse: Helen Dobson (m. 1846)
- Children: 5
- Parent(s): John Dickens; Elizabeth Dickens
- Relatives: Charles Dickens (brother); Frederick Dickens (brother); Augustus Dickens (brother)

Alfred Lamert Dickens (March 1822 – 27 July 1860) was an English railway engineer and the younger brother of the Victorian novelist Charles Dickens.

== Biography ==
As a boy Alfred, nicknamed Enrique by friends, attended a school in Hampstead with his brother Frederick Dickens for two years, until his father John Dickens could no longer afford the fees. At the end of the school day the boys would be collected by their older brother, Charles. On 20 February 1824, John Dickens was imprisoned in the Marshalsea Debtors' Prison for debt under the Insolvent Debtors Act 1813, because he owed a baker, James Kerr, £40 and 10 shillings. His wife Elizabeth Dickens, and her four youngest children, including the two-year-old Alfred, joined her husband in the Marshalsea in April 1824. John Dickens was released after three months, on 28 May 1824.

Some years later, John Dickens was again briefly imprisoned for debt and was released only when his son Charles borrowed money from his friends based on the security of his salary. However, on his release from prison, John Dickens immediately wrote begging letters to those same friends of his son's also asking for money. He wrote to Thomas Beard claiming that his son Alfred "is walking to and from Hampstead daily in dancing Pumps".

Charles Dickens wrote to his friend Angela Burdett-Coutts asking her to help Alfred to find a position as an engineer, "knowing the kind interest you take in any application or design of mine." Alfred Dickens later became an engineer for the Malton & Driffield Railway.

When the General Board of Health was established following the 1848 Public Health Act, Alfred Dickens became one of the group of civil engineers required by the Board to hold enquiries and produce reports investigating the petitions from individual local authorities (Local Boards) seeking town improvements and loans to fund them. One such in 1855, was Alfred Dickens's report which highlighted the terrible overcrowding suffered by many people in the Canning Town area of London. Among the other engineers at the General Board was Henry Austin, who had married Letitia Dickens, sister to Alfred and Charles Dickens, in 1837. The squalid conditions Charles Dickens described would have been influenced by these close family ties.

Alfred Dickens died at the Mosley Arms Inn in Manchester on 27 July 1860, from pleurisy. His widow, Helen, and their five children were living in Manchester at the time of his death, and Charles went there at once and brought them back with him to London. Alfred was buried on the western side of Highgate Cemetery, near to his father John, and then Charles took the family with him to his country home at Gads Hill Place in Kent, finding a farmhouse nearby for them to live in while he found them a home in London. Charles hired Helen to care for and mind his mother, Elizabeth Dickens (died 1863), for the remainder of his mother's life.

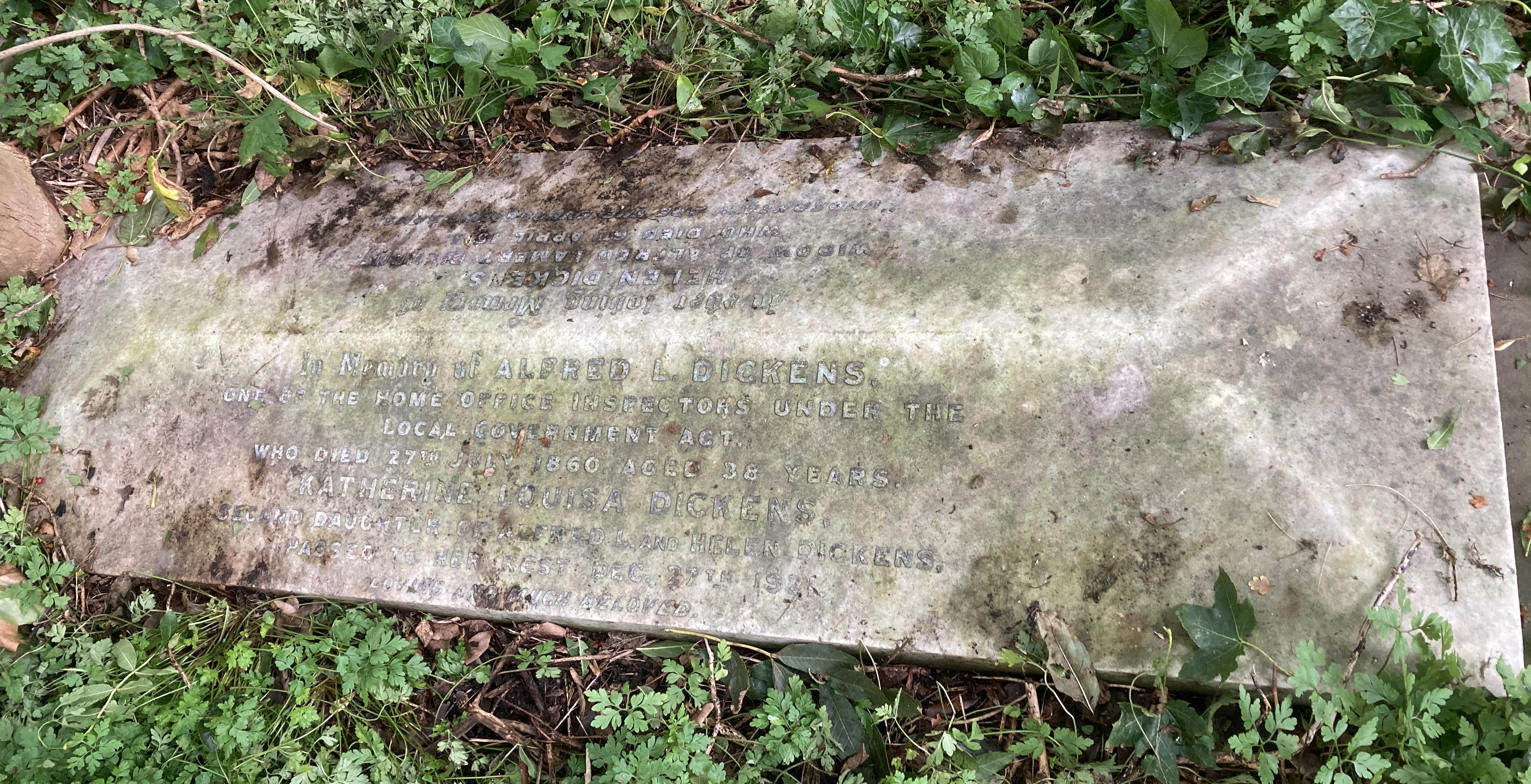
Family grave of Alfred Lamert Dickens in Highgate Cemetery

== Children ==
- Alfred Charles Dickens (1847/1848 – 1878)
- Edmund Henry Dickens (1849 – 22 May 1910)
- Florence Helen Dickens (1850 – 27 December 1941)
- Katherine Louisa Dickens (1853 – 27 December 1921)
- Augusta Maud Colls (née Dickens) (1854/5 – 1941)

== See also ==
- Dickens family
