= Frederick Dickens =

Brother of Charles Dickens

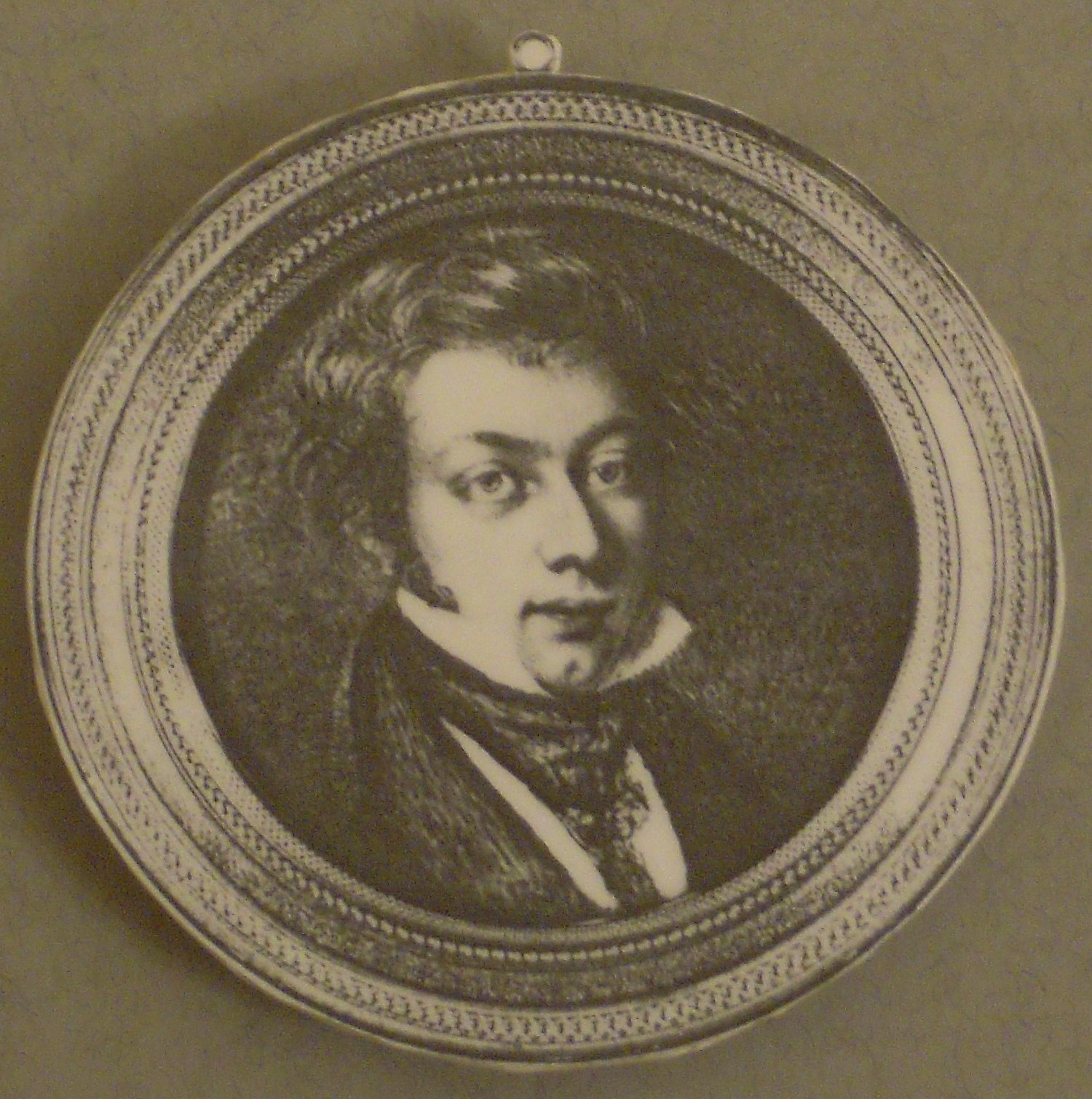
- Miniature of Frederick Dickens
- Born: 4 July 1820; London, England
- Died: 20 October 1868 (aged 48); Darlington, England
- Resting place: Darlington
- Occupation: Civil servant
- Known for: Brother of novelist Charles Dickens
- Spouse: Anna Weller (m. 1848; separation 1858)
- Parent(s): John Dickens; Elizabeth Dickens
- Relatives: Charles Dickens (brother); Alfred Lamert Dickens (brother); Augustus Dickens (brother)

Frederick William Dickens (4 July 1820 – 20 October 1868) was the son of John and Elizabeth Dickens and was Charles Dickens's younger brother, who lived with Charles when he moved on to Furnival's Inn in 1834. He was the inspiration for two different Freds in his brother's books: the jovial nephew of Ebenezer Scrooge in A Christmas Carol and the dissolute brother of Little Nell in The Old Curiosity Shop.

== Biography ==
While Fred was a child and a youth, Charles Dickens often described him as his favourite brother, showing great concern for his welfare. As a boy, Fred attended a school in Hampstead with his brother Alfred for two years, until their father, John Dickens, could no longer afford the fees. At the end of the school day, the boys would be collected by their older brother, Charles. On 20 February 1824, John Dickens was imprisoned in the Marshalsea Debtors' Prison for debt under the Insolvent Debtors Act 1813, because he owed a baker, James Kerr, £40 and 10 shillings. His wife, Elizabeth Barrow, and her three youngest children, including the four-year-old Fred, joined her husband in the Marshalsea in April 1824. John Dickens was released after three months, on 28 May 1824. In 1834, Fred went to live with his brother Charles when he moved into three-room chambers in Furnival's Inn. Fred went to live with Charles and his wife, Catherine Dickens, and their young family in their Doughty Street home and resided with them for a number of years.

When Charles and Catherine Dickens visited the United States in 1842, Fred Dickens remained in London and looked after his young nephews and nieces. Charles Dickens also helped Fred to find employment, firstly with a publisher and later in 1839 with the Treasury.

When Charles Dickens and his family visited Italy in 1843, Fred joined them for a period, but his visit almost turned to tragedy when he got into difficulties while swimming in the sea and had to be rescued by local fishermen. In 1845, the 25-year-old Fred Dickens fell in love with 15-year-old Anna Weller, a match that Charles disapproved of, as he did not trust the girl. His attitude caused a breach between the brothers, Charles believing by now that Fred possessed all the worst qualities of their father. Fred married Anna on 30 December 1848 despite Charles's misgivings, but in 1858 the couple applied for a judicial separation on the grounds of adultery. Anna was granted alimony, which Fred Dickens refused to pay, leaving the country. On his return in 1862, he was arrested and imprisoned for debt. Like his father before him, who had also been imprisoned for debt, Fred had gained credit from various sources by trading on his brother's fame, "...rasping my very heart," Charles Dickens stated. Fred became the inspiration for the dissolute brother of Little Nell, also named Fred, in The Old Curiosity Shop. During the period Charles was writing the novel, Fred Dickens had been obtaining money from his brother's friends and even tried to get money from Charles himself, who refused to help. On the day of his birthday Charles received a letter from Fred which said, "I cannot help saying that the tone of your letter is as cold & unfeeling as one Man could pen to another – much less one Brother to another... the world fancy from your writings that you are the most Tolerant of Men – let them individually come under your lash...& God help them..."

Fred spent the last years of his life as an alcoholic. After the separation from his wife, he moved to Darlington in the north-east of England, where he lived in the home of a retired innkeeper whom he had known in London. Living in poverty, people who knew him in his final days said that his only sustenance was a penny bun a day with a little ginger beer with gin added. Fred died at age 48 of asphyxia caused by a burst abscess on his lung. To his friend John Forster, Charles lamented Fred's "wasted life... but God forbid that one should be hard upon it, or upon anything in this world that is not deliberately and coldly wrong...". Unable to attend the funeral himself, Charles sent his oldest son, Charles Dickens, Jr., to represent the family. He also contributed to the cost of the funeral.

Frederick Dickens is buried in Darlington, within the grounds of the town's West Cemetery.

== See also ==
- Dickens family
