= John Dickens =

Father of Charles Dickens, clerk in the Royal Navy Pay Office

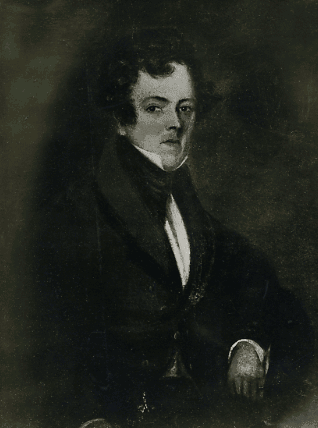
- Born: 21 August 1785; England
- Died: 31 March 1851 (aged 65); London, England
- Known for: Father of novelist Charles Dickens
- Spouse: Elizabeth Barrow
- Children: Frances Dickens; Charles Dickens; Alfred Allen Dickens; Letitia Dickens; Harriet Dickens; Frederick Dickens; Alfred Lamert Dickens; Augustus Dickens
- Parent(s): William Dickens; Elizabeth Ball

John Dickens (21 August 1785 – 31 March 1851) was the father of British novelist Charles Dickens and was the inspiration for the character Mr Micawber in his son's 1850 semi-autobiographical novel David Copperfield.

== Biography ==
The son of William Dickens (1719–1785), John Dickens worked as a clerk in the Royal Navy Pay Office at Portsmouth in Hampshire. On 13 June 1809 at St Mary le Strand, London, he married Elizabeth Barrow, with whom he had eight children. He was later transferred to London and then to Chatham, returning to live in Camden Town in London in 1822 to work in Somerset House. John Dickens found it difficult to provide for his growing family on his meagre income. Soon, his debts became so severe that all of the household goods were sold in an attempt to pay his bills, including furniture and silverware. He had eight children in total; his oldest child was Frances Elizabeth Dickens whilst his second oldest was Charles Dickens. John's debts became too much and he was put in prison for debtors. This predicament caused Charles to leave school at the age of twelve to work in a factory, as he had become 'the man of the house' and the breadwinner in his father's absence.

== Marshalsea Prison ==
Described by his son Charles as "a jovial opportunist with no money sense", unable to satisfy his creditors, on 20 February 1824 John Dickens was imprisoned in the Marshalsea Debtors' Prison under the Insolvent Debtors (England) Act 1813 (53 Geo. 3. c. 102), because he owed a baker, James Kerr, £40 and 10 shillings. In April 1824 his wife, Elizabeth, joined her husband in the Marshalsea with their four youngest children. John was released after three months, on 28 May 1824, as a result of the death of his mother, Elizabeth Dickens, of the parish of St George, Hanover Square, who had left him the sum of £450 in her will. On the expectation of this legacy, Dickens petitioned for, and was granted, release from prison. Under the Insolvent Debtors Act, Dickens arranged for payment of his creditors, and he and his family left Marshalsea for the home of Mrs. Roylance, with whom his 12-year-old son Charles was lodging.

Some years later, John was again briefly imprisoned for debt and was released only when his son Charles borrowed money from his friends based on the security of his salary. However, on his release from prison, John Dickens immediately wrote begging letters to those same friends of his son also asking for money. He wrote to Thomas Beard claiming that his son Alfred "is walking to and from Hampstead daily in dancing Pumps".

== Later years ==
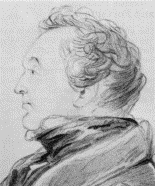
John Dickens by Edwin Roffe

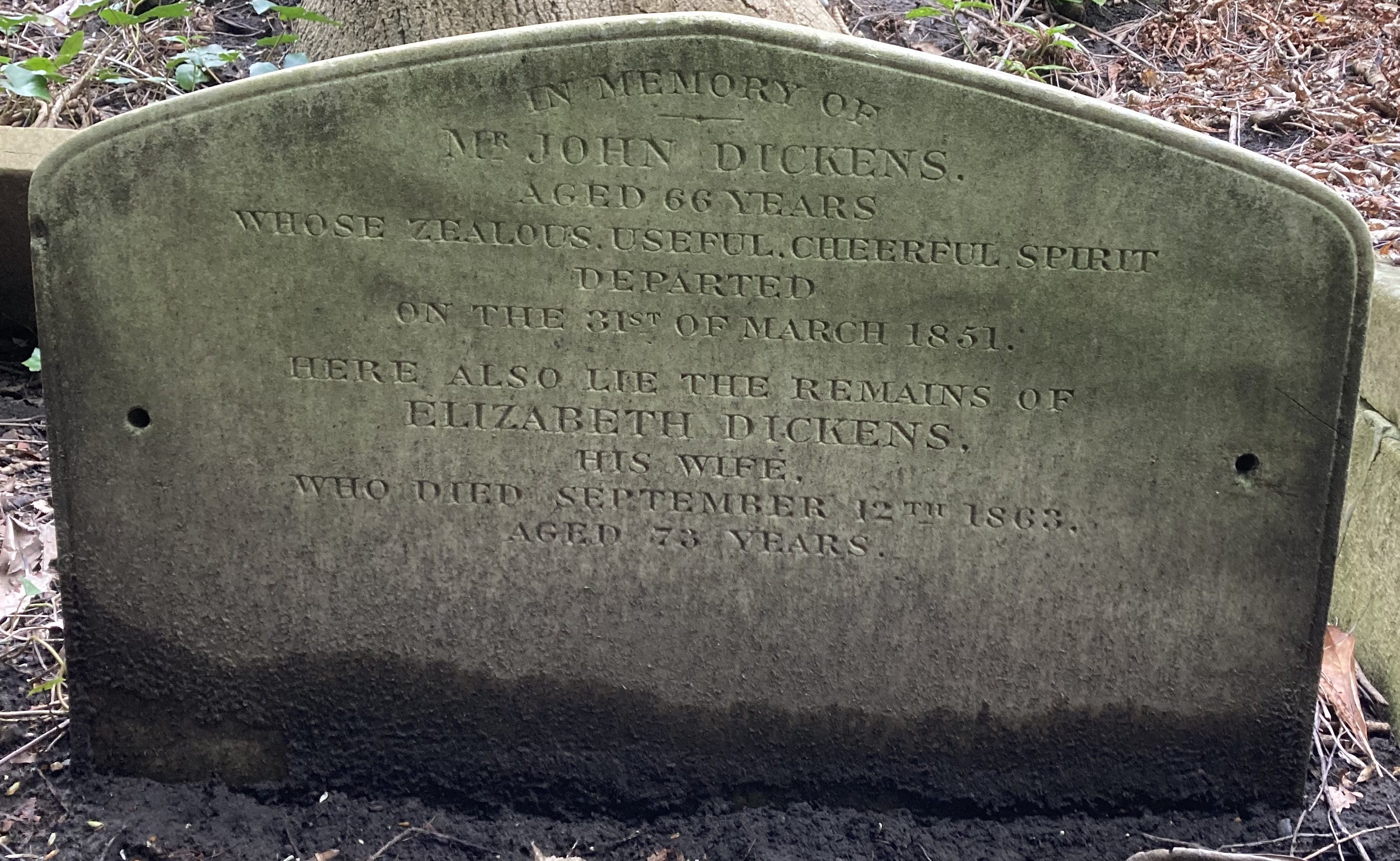
John Dickens's grave in Highgate Cemetery (west side)

Later he became a journalist, and in 1828 a parliamentary reporter, like his famous son before him. When Charles Dickens gained fame as a writer John Dickens frequently embarrassed his son by seeking loans from Charles's friends and publishers behind his back and by selling pages from his son's early manuscripts. By 1836 John, his wife and youngest son Augustus Dickens were lodging at Edward Street, just north of the City Road. Edward Street was later renamed Micawber Street. Concerned about his father's financial problems, in March 1839 Charles Dickens rented Mile End Cottage in Alphington for his parents and youngest brother Augustus. The intention was to remove John as far away from London as possible in a comfortable residence, while reducing embarrassment to Charles. However, John Dickens merely continued to write to Charles's friends and publishers asking for money. He and his wife returned to London in 1842.

On 31 March 1851, John Dickens died of a urethral infection. According to a letter that Charles Dickens sent to his wife, John Dickens had been suffering from a bladder disease but had kept the condition secret until little could be done. After an operation, John Dickens lingered for several days before he died. The death certificate listed the cause of death as: "Rupture of the urethra from old standing stricture and consequent mortification of the scrotum from infiltration of urine."

Dickens depicted his father in the character of Wilkins Micawber in his semi-autobiographical novel David Copperfield. Micawber lived at Windsor Terrace, City Road. This is just south of Micawber Street which was previously named Edward Street.

John Dickens was buried in Highgate Cemetery, where in 1863 his remains were joined by those of his wife, Elizabeth.

== Children of John Dickens ==
- Frances (Fanny) Elizabeth Dickens (1810–1848)
- Charles Dickens (1812–1870)
- Alfred Allan Dickens (1814–1814)
- Letitia Dickens (1816–1893)
- Harriet Dickens (1819–1824)
- Frederick Dickens (1820–1868)
- Alfred Lamert Dickens (1822–1860)
- Augustus Dickens (1827–1866)

== In popular culture ==
John Dickens is played by Jonathan Pryce in the 2017 film, The Man Who Invented Christmas, which portrays the 1843 writing and production of Charles Dickens's A Christmas Carol.

== See also ==
- Dickens family
