= The Man Who Invented Christmas (film) =

2017 film directed by Bharat Nalluri

- Theatrical release poster
- Directed by: Bharat Nalluri
- Screenplay by: Susan Coyne
- Based on: The Man Who Invented Christmas by Les Standiford
- Produced by: Robert Mickelson; Ronnie Coleman; Ian Sharples; Paula Mazur; Mitchell Kaplan; Andrew Karpen; Vadim Jean
- Starring: Dan Stevens; Christopher Plummer; Jonathan Pryce
- Cinematography: Ben Smithard
- Edited by: Stephen O'Connell; Jamie Pearson
- Music by: Mychael Danna
- Production companies: Parallel Films; Rhombus Media
- Distributed by: Elevation Pictures (Canada); Wildcard Distribution (Ireland)
- Release dates: 10 November 2017 (Cork Film Festival); 22 November 2017 (Canada)
- Running time: 104 minutes
- Countries: Ireland; Canada
- Language: English
- Box office: $8.6 million

The Man Who Invented Christmas is a 2017 Christmas biographical comedy drama film about Charles Dickens directed by Bharat Nalluri and written by Susan Coyne. Based on Les Standiford's 2008 book of the same name, it stars Dan Stevens, Christopher Plummer, and Jonathan Pryce, and follows Dickens (Stevens) as he conceives and writes A Christmas Carol.

The film was produced by Parallel Film and Rhombus Media. It was released by Bleecker Street in the United States on 22 November 2017, and by Thunderbird Releasing in the United Kingdom on 1 December 2017. It received generally positive reviews from critics.

== Plot ==
In 1843, four years after the success of Oliver Twist, Charles Dickens is experiencing financial pressures after the failures of his last three books. To restore his finances, he sets out to write a new one, but when his publishers will not meet his target of publication before Christmas, he decides to publish it himself.

Seeing inspiration around London, most notably a rich man's funeral that is largely unattended and a mean-spirited old man who gives him the catchphrase "Humbug" and inspiration of a new character, Charles begins writing A Christmas Carol. It's due in six weeks in order to be published by Christmas, despite his friends and publishers telling him that the book will also be a failure, as Christmas (at the time) was considered irrelevant and few people celebrated it.

As Charles develops the story, he interacts with the characters that he imagines as manifesting in front of him, most notably Ebenezer Scrooge. He is helped by one of his servants, Tara, a literate Irish nursemaid to his children, with whom he discusses story elements.

While writing his book, Charles is greeted by the unannounced arrival of his eccentric father John Dickens, whom Charles views as immature and fiscally irresponsible. When Charles shows Tara the next draft, she is distraught that Scrooge would not save Tiny Tim). She believes that people can change, and suggests instead that Scrooge saves Tiny Tim.

However, Charles finds it difficult to accept that a man as cruel and cold as Scrooge could undergo transformation. He rejects the idea, yet it continues to trouble him, manifesting as writer's block. As he struggles with resolving Scrooge's ending, his relationships with family and friends become increasingly strained, while his debts continue to grow.

Finally Charles sends both his parents and Tara out of the house in a fit of rage. The next morning, he regrets dismissing her, but is unable to find and rehire her. His wife, Catherine Dickens, tearfully confronts Charles over his recklessness and instability, and tells him that she believes that he puts his work before his own family.

It is revealed that much of Charles' animosity toward his father stems from his childhood trauma of laboring in a blacking factory after his family was taken to debtors' prison, all due to John Dickens' failure to pay his debts. Charles returns to the long-abandoned factory, where he confronts his own insecurities through the figure of Scrooge. Realizing that the story must centre on redemption, he races home to complete the manuscript. As he prepares to deliver it to the printer, Tara arrives to return a book he had lent her; Charles apologizes for his earlier outburst and invites her back into the household.

At his wife's suggestion, Charles also reconciles with his father, who is preparing to leave London. After reuniting with his family, he submits the manuscript in time for publication before Christmas. The Dickens family celebrates the holiday, and a closing text notes the overnight success of A Christmas Carol and its enduring influence on Christmas traditions.

== Cast ==
- Dan Stevens as Charles Dickens, a well-known author with worldwide fame
  - Ely Solan as Young Charles Dickens
- Morfydd Clark as Catherine "Kate" Dickens, Charles’ wife and the mother of his children
- Justin Edwards as John Forster, a close personal friend of Charles, who acts as his agent, and becomes the model for the Ghost of Christmas Present
- Christopher Plummer as Mr Scratch, a miserly businessman whom Dickens meets, who becomes the model for Ebenezer Scrooge
- Jonathan Pryce as Mr. John Dickens, Charles’ father
- Ger Ryan as Mrs. Elizabeth Dickens, Charles’ mother
- Anna Murphy as Tara, an Irish maid who works for the Dickens family, who becomes the model for the Ghost of Christmas Past
- Miriam Margolyes as Mrs. Fisk, the housekeeper for the Dickens family
- Cosimo Massimo Fusco as Signor Giuseppe Mazzini, the decorator in charge of the Dickens house
- David McSavage as William Hall, one of Dickens’ publishers
- Ian McNeice as Edward Chapman, one of Dickens’ publishers
- Miles Jupp as William Makepeace Thackeray, a well-known author and rival of Dickens
- Bill Paterson as Mr. Grimsby, a wealthy businessman who becomes an inspiration for A Christmas Carol
- Donald Sumpter as Mr Haddock, Dickens’ miserly attorney who becomes the inspiration for Jacob Marley
- Simon Callow as John Leech, an illustrator who works on A Christmas Carol
- Katie McGuinness as Fanny Burnett (née Dickens), Charles’ sister who becomes the model for Mrs. Cratchit
- Marcus Lamb as Rev. Henry Burnett, Charles’ brother-in-law who becomes the model for Bob Cratchit
- Pearse Kearney as Henry Burnett Jr., the crippled son of Rev. Burnett and Fanny, who inspires Tiny Tim Cratchit

== Production ==
In addition to filming at Ardmore studios in Wicklow in Ireland, location filming was completed in and around Dublin (including Henrietta Street and North Great Georges Street) as well as in Wicklow; the latter was "transformed into 1840's Victorian England" according to one source. Principal photography was completed on 21 January 2017.

=== Historical accuracy ===
In an interview, Stevens said of the film's historical accuracy: "Frankly, whether it's historically accurate, I'm not that concerned about. I was interested in that moment of the creative process, watching a great man struggle – to me, that's dramatically and comedically interesting. Certainly, I was keen not to play Dickens as a bearded old sage." He also expressed an interest in Miriam Margolyes' theory that Dickens was bipolar, saying: "There were moments when he was bleak and depressive. But I think there were moments when he was great fun to be around, very silly and playful."

A Time magazine review mentions that "some major plot points are the product of dramatic license" but concludes that the film "does provide viewers with a fairly accurate sense of how Dickens successfully changed the way Christmas is celebrated".

Dickens is shown visiting Warren's Blacking Factory as an adult, but this building was demolished in the early 1830s.

== Release and reception ==
The film was released in the United States in 500 theaters on 22 November 2017.

=== Critical response ===
On Rotten Tomatoes, the film has an approval rating of 79% based on 174 reviews, with an average rating of 6.40/10. The website's critical consensus reads, "The Man Who Invented Christmas adds holiday magic to the writing of A Christmas Carol, putting a sweetly revisionist spin on the story behind a classic yuletide tale." On Metacritic, the film has a weighted average score 60 out of 100, based on reviews from 32 critics, indicating "mixed or average reviews".

Peter Debruge of Variety wrote: "In addition to being a rather fine addition to the Christmas-movie canon, the film marks a useful teaching tool — a better option for classroom screenings than any of the previous "Carol" adaptations, once students have finished reading the novella." Peter Bradshaw of The Guardian was less impressed, giving it one star and calling it "a kind of wacky and saccharine muttonchop-whisker-gawd-bless-yer fantasy-comedy". He thought Stevens was miscast, and that "Not even a good cast can help a film as tin-eared as this."

=== Accolades ===
It was nominated on 27 June 2018 at the 44th Saturn Awards for Best International Film.

== See also ==
- List of Christmas films
