= Augustus Dickens =

Brother of novelist Charles Dickens (1827–1866)

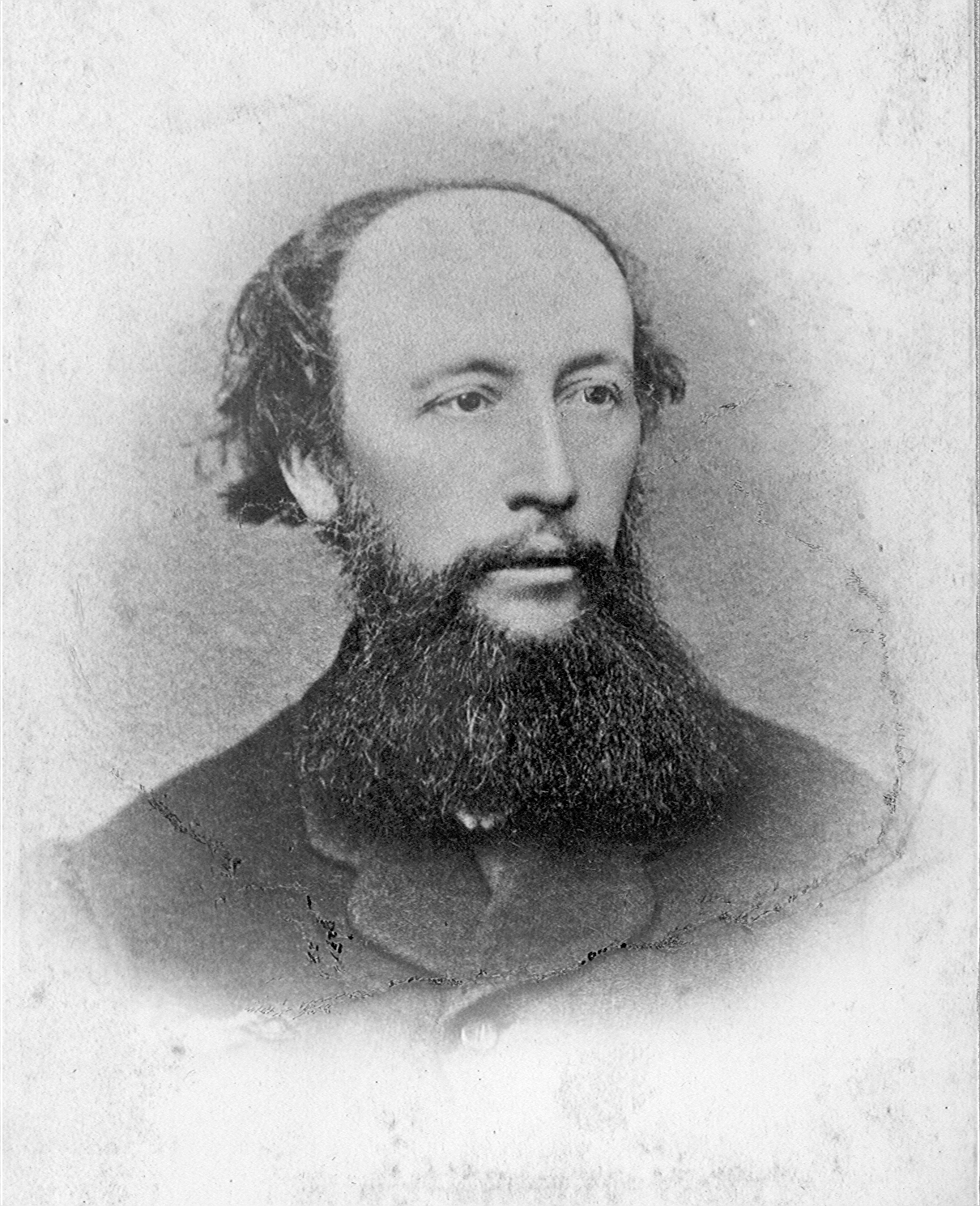
- Born: Augustus Newnham Dickens; 10 November 1827; London, England
- Died: 4 October 1866 (aged 38); Chicago, Illinois, U.S.
- Resting place: Graceland Cemetery
- Other name: Moses
- Occupation: Journalist
- Known for: Brother of novelist Charles Dickens
- Spouses: Harriett Lovell; Bertha Phillips (common-law)
- Children: 3
- Parent(s): John Dickens; Elizabeth Dickens
- Relatives: Charles Dickens (brother); Frederick Dickens (brother); Alfred Lamert Dickens (brother)

Augustus Newnham Dickens (10 November 1827 – 4 October 1866) was the youngest brother of English novelist Charles Dickens, and the inspiration for Charles's pen name 'Boz'. Augustus emigrated to America and pursued various careers including as a land agent in Chicago. While he was described as social and cultured, with his home the center of lively gatherings, including artists and writers, there were rumors of alcoholism. He had also left his first wife in England to emigrate with another woman, who was known as his wife in America. He died aged 38, perhaps of tuberculosis and is buried in Graceland Cemetery.

== Early life ==
Augustus Dickens was the son of Elizabeth (née Barrow) and John Dickens, a clerk in the Navy Pay Office at Portsmouth. Charles Dickens's pen name, 'Boz', was actually taken from his youngest brother's family nickname 'Moses', given to him in honour of one of the brothers in The Vicar of Wakefield (one of the most widely read novels in the early 19th century), which when playfully pronounced through the nose became corrupted as 'Boses', and later shortened to 'Boz' – pronounced with a long vowel 'o' through the nose.

=== Early career in London ===
In 1844, Charles Dickens wrote to Chapman & Co., a shipping merchant, trying to obtain a position for Augustus, saying "I have a young brother recently come up from a good school at Exeter, and now living, with his father, at Greenwich...He is quick and clever: has never given trouble to anybody: and has been well brought up."

In 1845 and 1847, Augustus performed in Charles Dickens's amateur theatricals while continuing to work for Chapman & Co. In 1848, Charles Dickens invited Thomas Chapman, his brother's employer, to Augustus's wedding and "to breakfast with us on the day of Augustus's marriage to Harriett Lovell at Trinity Church, Marylebone, on 5 December 1848.

== Life in the United States ==
While still married to his wife, Harriett, Dickens moved to the United States together with Bertha Phillips (1829–1868), with whom he reportedly lived as man and wife once in America.

=== Amboy, Illinois ===
Augustus Dickens's presence in America was first recorded in February 1855 when he was listed as the editor of the newly-launched Lee County Times in Amboy, Illinois. By August of the same year he had ceased to be associated with that newspaper. On 4 June 1857, he placed an advert in the same paper, by then renamed The Amboy Times, announcing the opening of his People's Cheap Store. He is reported to have subsequently sold that store and purchased a small farm in the area.

=== Freemasonry and possible return to England ===
It is possible that Augustus returned to England for about a year between these two events, as he is reported to have joined the Freemasons in London, being initiated into Universal Lodge No.212 on 23 November 1855, and was present at two further meetings on 28 December 1855 and 25 January 1856. At the third meeting, he proposed his elder brother Alfred Lamerte [sic] Dickens for membership. He is also recorded in the minutes as present on 28 November 1856, but after this, there is no clear record of his attending the Lodge. By 27 April 1860, his brother Alfred is recorded as the Master of the Lodge.

=== Chicago, Illinois ===
In June 1860 Dickens moved to Chicago where he obtained a job with the Illinois Central Land Department. Once settled he sent for Bertha and his three children, Bertram, Adrian, and Amy Bertha Dickens. Frederick Barnard, a neighbour of Augustus Dickens at this time later wrote:

I remember Augustus Dickens well," he said. "A more genial and whole-souled man never lived. His face bore a remarkable resemblance to portraits of his brother that I have seen. Augustus was small and spare and not at all striking in appearance. But his ready humor, his brilliant conversation, made him the life of whatever company he happened to be in, and he was probably the most popular man in the land office. His manners were most polished and he gave the impression of having had a splendid education... their house was the frequent gathering place of a coterie of people of refinement and culture and of musicians...of great ability. Mrs. Dickens' playing of classical music on the piano was grand...She was familiar with the music of all the great composers, and to hear her play at evening receptions and parties at her home was a great treat for her guests. She would often sing as she played, and I can remember clearly the rich, mellow sweetness of her voice. Mrs. Dickens was an exemplary wife, a woman of gentle breeding and fine education.

An article in The Chicago Herald in 1895 described Augustus as "inert, indifferent and thriftless. He was competent enough, but he was addicted to intemperance to a degree that practically blighted his usefulness. What he might have become, if of correct habits, no one dared to predict. As it was, he wasted his slender income on liquor". The paper claimed that several letters were written begging Dickens to come to Chicago to see his brother's plight, but that, to avoid having to meet his brother and his family, Charles Dickens avoided Chicago when he visited the United States on his reading tours. In reality, though, Augustus was already dead by the time Dickens's American tour was even announced.

== Death and legacy ==
Augustus Dickens died from tuberculosis in America aged 38 and was buried in Graceland Cemetery in Chicago.

His elder brother, Charles, provided financial support for both Augustus's first wife, Harriett Dickens—who by that time was "afflicted by blindness"—and Bertha, who was described as Mrs Bertha Philips [sic] Dickens in Augustus's will.

Bertha Phillips died on 24 December 1868 due to an apparent overdose of morphine. This has been speculated to have been a suicide, although she was taking morphine for a medical condition at the time, so could have been accidental.

== See also ==
- Dickens family
