= Elizabeth Barrow =

Elizabeth Barrow may refer to:

- Elizabeth Dickens (née Barrow; 1789–1863) wife of John Dickens and mother of Charles Dickens
- Eliza Mary Barrow, murdered by Frederick Seddon in 1911
