= Silly Beggar =

2009 Scottish comedy book

Silly Beggar - The World's Stupidest Begging Letters
- Author: James Spence
- Cover artist: James Spence
- Language: English
- Genre: Humour, correspondence
- Publisher: Aurora Metro
- Publication date: 14 May 2009
- Publication place: United Kingdom
- Media type: Print (paperback)
- Pages: 200 pp (first edition paperback)
- ISBN: 978-1-906582-03-6
- OCLC: 298179327

Silly Beggar – The World's Stupidest Begging Letters is a book by Scottish author James Spence. The book was published on 14 May 2009 by Aurora Metro, and is a collection of comedy begging letters sent to companies, together with the replies and images of items the sender received. Letters included in the book were sent to such companies as Shell, Hovis, Boots and Starbucks.

== Popularity ==
Some newspapers including the Daily Mirror and the Daily Record ran full page articles about the book and the author was interviewed in various media including Chris Evans Drivetime on BBC Radio 2, MacAulay and Co on BBC Radio Scotland and Richard & Judy's New Position on the Watch channel.
