= Lois Baxter =

British actress

- Born: 26 April 1947 (age 79); Bridgwater, Somerset, England
- Occupation: Actress
- Spouse: David Savile (m. 1974)
- Parent(s): Dr John Baxter; Christine D. Baxter (née Arkens)

Lois Ann Baxter (born 26 April 1947) is a British actress, known for playing Marie Stanton in Coronation Street from 1976 to 1977, and Lady Caroline in the period drama When the Boat Comes In.

Baxter was born in Bridgwater, Somerset, the daughter of Dr John Baxter and Christine D. Baxter (née Arkens). The family later moved to Worthen in Shropshire where her father was a GP for many years. She attended Shrewsbury High School from 1951 to 1959 when she left for Moreton Hall School.

Other appearances include: The Black Stuff, Spyder's Web, Within These Walls, Hadleigh, Z-Cars, Van der Valk, Crown Court, Doctor Who (as Madame Lamia in The Androids of Tara), Dickens of London (as Mary Hogarth, Charles Dickens' sister-in-law), All Creatures Great and Small, Angels, Minder, The Cleopatras, Bergerac, Tales of the Unexpected, Dempsey and Makepeace, Casualty, Holby City, The Bill and The Comic Strip Presents. She has guest-starred in the audio dramas Sapphire and Steel: Cruel Immortality, Circular Time and The Adolescence of Time. She appeared as QC Joyce in 2004's “Shadowplay”, S4:E11&12 of Waking the Dead.

== Partial filmography ==
- Ooh… You Are Awful (1972) - Jane Seaton (uncredited)
- Dickens of London (1976) - Mary Hogarth
- Doll's Eye (1982) - Receptionist
