= Fanny Dickens =

Sister of Charles Dickens (1810-1848)

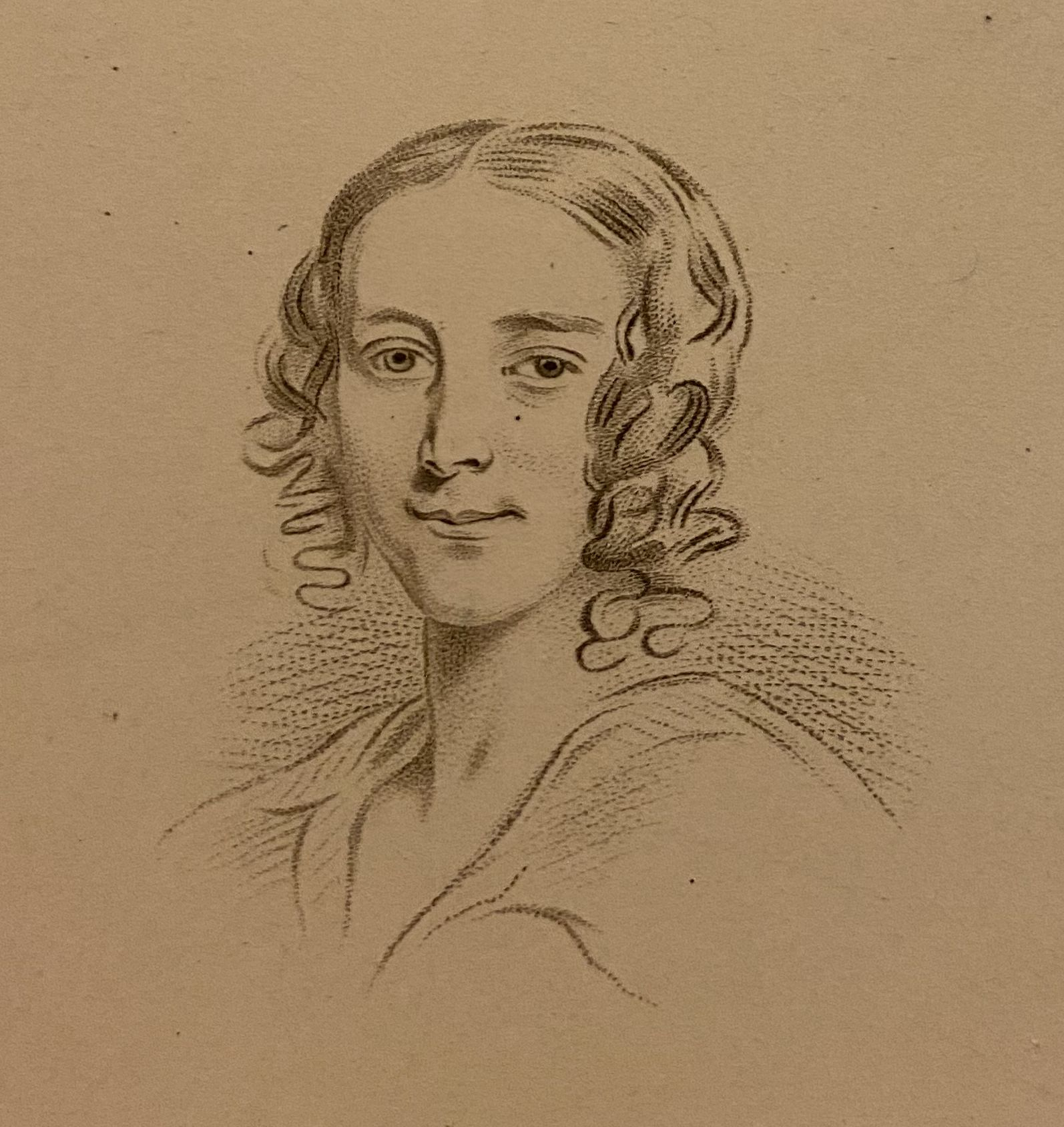
- Born: Frances Elizabeth Dickens; 28 August 1810; Portsmouth, England
- Died: 2 September 1848 (aged 38); London, England
- Burial place: Highgate Cemetery
- Occupations: Pianist and singer
- Spouse: Henry Burnett
- Children: 2
- Relatives: Charles Dickens (brother)

Frances Elizabeth Dickens (28 August 1810 – 2 September 1848) was an English pianist and singer who trained at the Royal Academy of Music. She was the elder sister of Charles Dickens.

== Early life and career ==
Born in Landport in Portsea Island (Portsmouth) on 28 August 1810 and baptised on 23 November at St Mary's Church, Portsea, she was the eldest of eight children of Elizabeth Dickens, née Barrow, and John Dickens, a clerk in the Navy Pay Office. Charles Dickens was the second child of the family, born in 1812. Dickens showed musical ability and in 1823 gained a place at the Royal Academy of Music which had opened the year before in Tenterden Street, off Hanover Square. The fees were thirty-eight guineas a year which her family could ill afford but, unusually for the time, they paid for a daughter to be educated rather than their sons.

Dickens studied singing, and piano with Ignaz Moscheles, a former pupil of Ludwig van Beethoven. In her second year she received a prize for ‘good conduct and improvement in music’ and a silver pencil case as 2nd prize in piano. In 1835 she sang in a concert as part of a group which included Henry Burnett, who had studied at the Academy. They married on 13 September 1837 at St Luke's Church, Chelsea, where Charles Dickens had married Catherine Hogarth the year before.

== Personal life ==
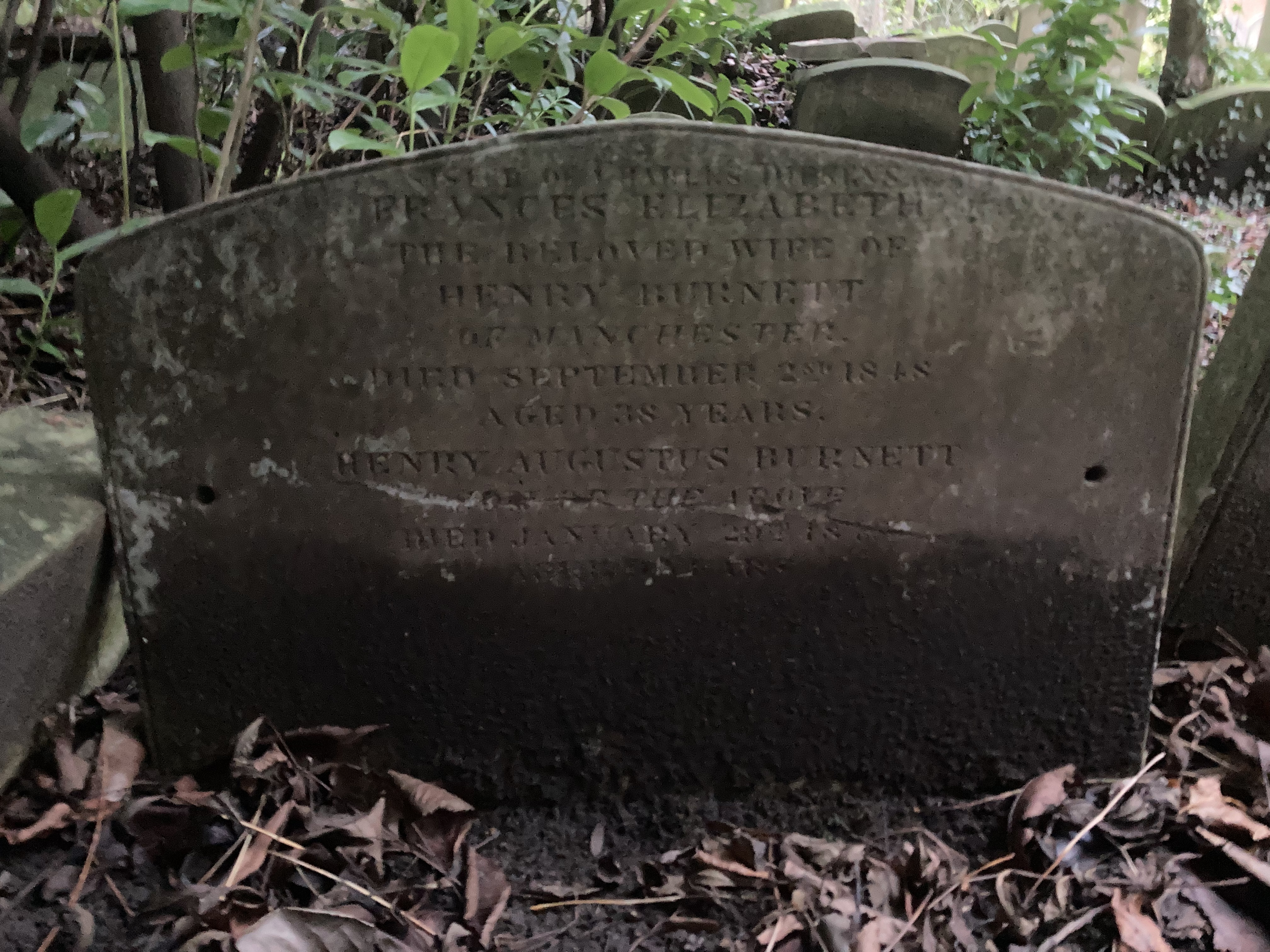
Family grave of Frances Burnett (Fanny Dickens) in Highgate Cemetery

The couple had two sons: Henry Augustus in 1839, and Charles Dickens Kneller in 1841, both born in London. Henry Jr was a disabled and sickly child and is said to have been the inspiration for Tiny Tim in Charles Dickens’s A Christmas Carol.

The family moved to Manchester, where Dickens and Henry continued their singing, although "once Fanny Dickens had married and become a mother, her career declined, gifted and musically educated as she was". She developed tuberculosis and moved, with the family, back to London for treatment, but died on 2 September 1848 after a lingering illness at the age of 38. She was buried in the dissenters section of the western side of Highgate Cemetery. Their son Henry died soon after in 1849 and is buried with his mother. Her parents are buried nearby in the cemetery, as are other members of the Dickens family.

== See also ==
- Dickens family
