= Elizabeth Dickens =

Mother of Charles Dickens

- Born: Elizabeth Culliford Barrow; 21 December 1789
- Died: 12 September 1863 (aged 73)
- Spouse: John Dickens
- Children: Frances Dickens; Charles Dickens; Alfred Allen Dickens; Letitia Dickens; Harriet Dickens; Frederick Dickens; Alfred Lamert Dickens; Augustus Dickens
- Parent(s): Charles Barrow; Mary Culliford
- Family: Barrow, Dickens

Elizabeth Culliford Dickens (née Barrow; 21 December 1789 – 12 September 1863) was the wife of John Dickens and the mother of English novelist Charles Dickens. She was the source for Mrs. Nickleby in her son's novel Nicholas Nickleby and for Mrs Micawber in David Copperfield.

== Early years and marriage ==
One of eight children of Mary Culliford (1771–1851) and Charles Barrow (1759–1826), Elizabeth Barrow was introduced to John Dickens by her brother, Thomas Culliford Barrow, when the two men were working at the Navy Pay Office in nearby Somerset House. When John Dickens first met Elizabeth she was "a small pretty girl of about sixteen, with bright hazel eyes, an inordinate sense of the ludicrous, and remarkable powers of comic mimicry, cheerful, sweet-tempered, and well educated". In 1810 Elizabeth's father, who also worked for the Navy Pay Office as Chief Conductor of Monies in Town, was found guilty of embezzling £5,689 3s 3d and fled to the Continent, turning up 13 years later in the Isle of Man. Elizabeth married John Dickens on 13 June 1809 in the church of St Mary-le-Strand in London. Shortly after the marriage the couple moved to Landport in Portsmouth and here Charles Dickens, the second of their eight children, was born in 1812. As a young boy he was taught to read by his mother, and later also a little Latin, awakening, as Charles later told his friend and biographer John Forster "his first desire for knowledge and his earliest passion for reading". According to Mary Weller, the Dickenses' servant when they were living in Chatham, Elizabeth Dickens was "a dear, good mother and a fine woman".

Another of her brothers, Robert Irving Barrow was an artist and architectural illustrator.

== Marshalsea Prison ==
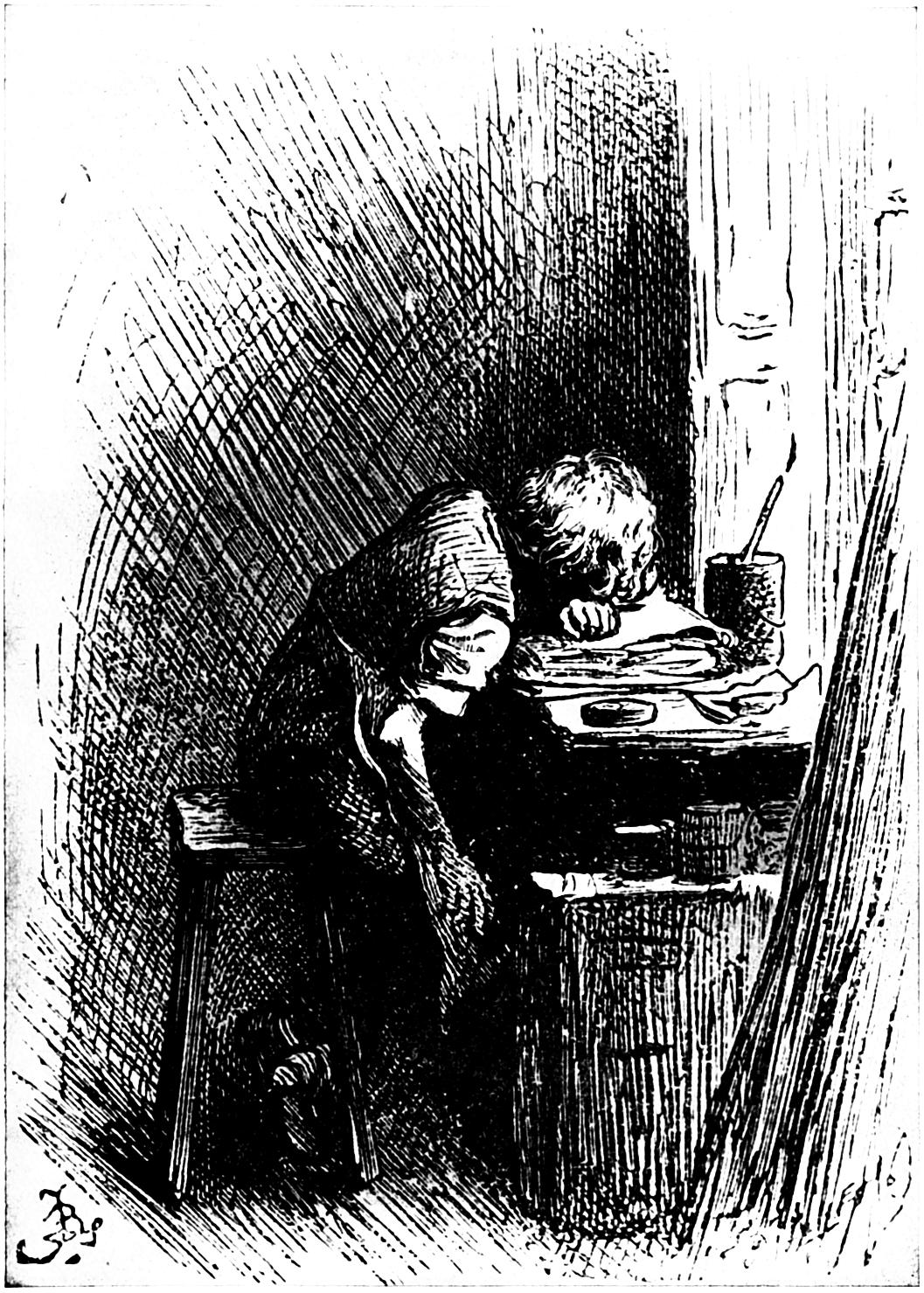
A 1904 artist's impression of Dickens in the shoe-polish factory

By 1822 her husband had fallen heavily into debt, and Elizabeth, like Mrs Micawber in David Copperfield, tried to help his financial situation by setting up a school called 'Mrs Dickens's Establishment' in Gower Street in London; this despite the fact that she had no experience in teaching or administering a school. Unsurprisingly, no pupils materialised. As Charles Dickens later wrote, "Nobody ever came to the school, nor do I recollect that anybody ever proposed to come, or that the least preparation was made to receive anybody." To help support the family financially the 12-year-old Charles Dickens, to his great humiliation, was taken from school to work at Warren's Blacking Factory where his wages were 6s a week. On 20 February 1824 John Dickens was imprisoned in the Marshalsea Prison for debt, with Elizabeth Dickens and their four youngest children joining her husband there in April 1824. John Dickens was released after three months, on 28 May 1824, on the death of his mother, who had left him the sum of £450 in her will, allowing him to clear his debt.

When John Dickens was released from prison, Charles's mother did not immediately remove him from the boot-blacking factory which was owned by a relation of hers, James Lamert. However, a disagreement between John Dickens and Joseph Lamert, Charles's employer, resulted in his being removed from the blacking factory. Elizabeth Dickens did all she could to patch up the quarrel so that her son could return to work; John Dickens, however, insisted that his son should return to school. For the rest of his life, Charles never forgave his mother for wanting to keep him in the factory.

Charles Dickens was educated at Wellington House Academy until 1827 when his father again fell into debt and could not pay his school fees nor those of his sister Fanny at the Royal Academy of Music. At this time Elizabeth Dickens met Edward Blackmore, a young solicitor and a partner in the law firm of Ellis and Blackmore. When Blackmore thought the 15-year-old Charles Dickens "exceedingly good looking and clever", she persuaded him to take her son on as a law clerk.

By the early 1850s Elizabeth Dickens had grown into a stout matriarch 'with some affectations of youthfulness, particularly [in] the "juvenility of her dress" and her semicomic confusions of speech'. Her son described her wardrobe as 'the attempt "of middle-aged mutton to dress itself lamb fashion"'.

== Later years ==
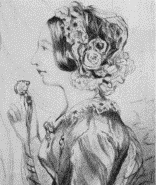
Elizabeth Dickens by Edwin Roffe

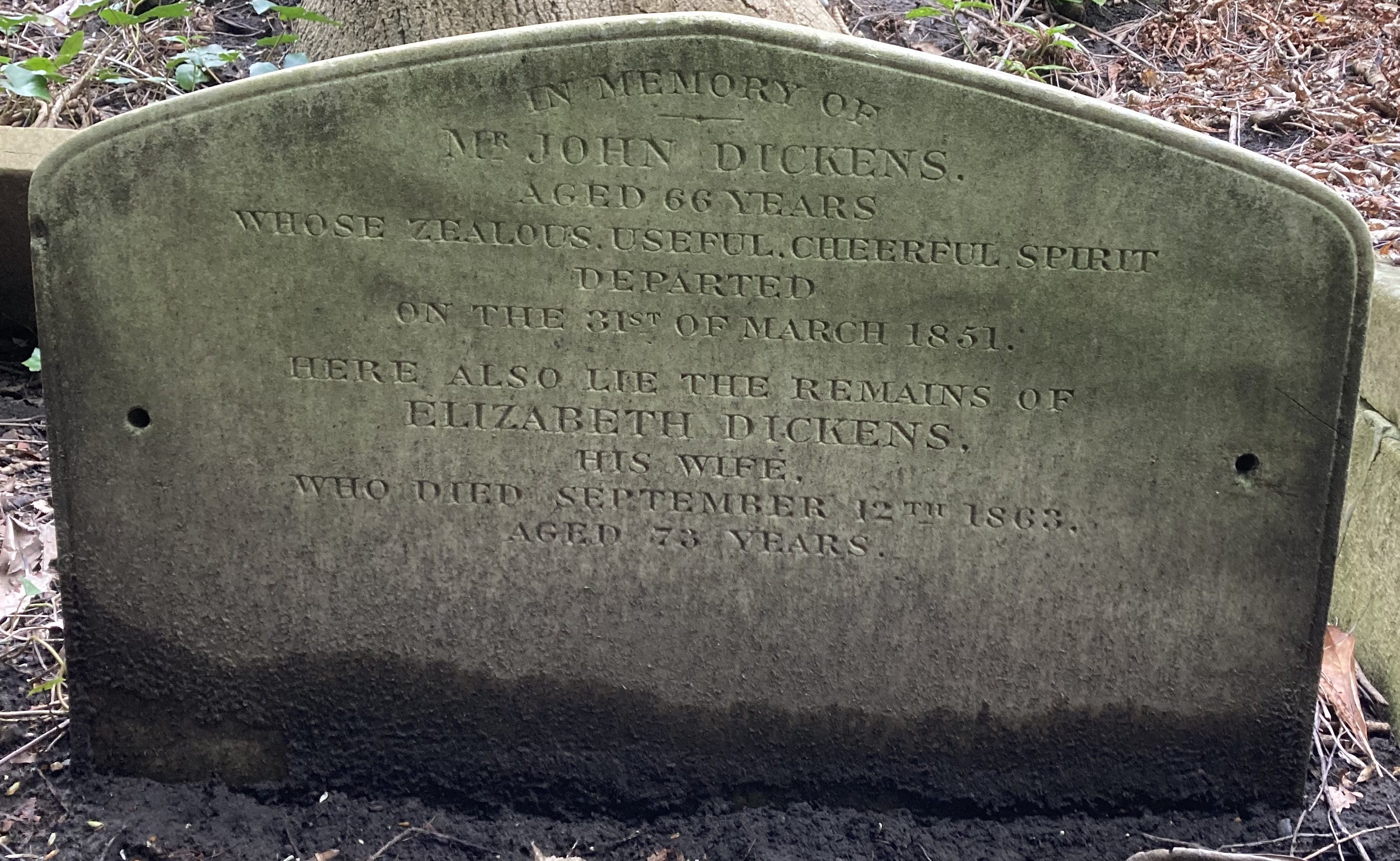
Elizabeth Dickens grave in Highgate Cemetery (west side)

When Charles Dickens gained fame as a writer, John Dickens frequently embarrassed his son by seeking loans from Charles's friends and publishers behind his back, and by selling pages from his son's early manuscripts. Concerned about his father's financial problems, in 1839 Charles Dickens rented a cottage for his parents far from London, and, as he thought, far from temptation, at Alphington in Devon. However, John Dickens merely continued to write to Charles's friends and publishers asking for money. Charles received an "unsatisfactory epistle from Mother" and both parents wrote him "hateful, sneering letters", feeling that he had exiled them. "I do swear," Charles complained, "I am sick at heart with both her and father too." In 1842 John and Elizabeth Dickens returned to London and eventually Charles was reconciled with his parents.

By early 1860 Elizabeth Dickens had become senile, probably incontinent and in need of constant attention. Her son Charles took responsibility for her care and support. The death of her younger son Alfred in August 1860 was beyond her understanding. Charles later wrote, "My mother, who was also left to me when my father died (I never had anything left to me but relations), is in the strangest state of mind from senile decay; and the impossibility of getting her to understand what is the matter, combined with her desire to be got up in sables like a female Hamlet, illumines the dreary scene with a ghastly absurdity that is the chief relief I can find in it." In her last years she became increasingly like Charles's portrait of her as Nicholas Nickleby's mother. Charles hired Alfred's widow to mind and take care of his mother.

== Death ==
Elizabeth Dickens died on 12 September 1863. At that time she was described as "hopelessly senile". She is buried with her husband in Highgate Cemetery. For her gravestone her son Charles Dickens wrote the dispassionate epitaph "HERE ALSO LIE THE REMAINS OF ELIZABETH DICKENS WHO DIED SEPTEMBER 12TH 1863 AGED 73 YEARS".

== Legacy ==
Charles Dickens used his mother as the source for the vain, ineffectual and verbally comic Mrs. Nickleby in his novel Nicholas Nickleby and for Mrs Micawber in David Copperfield.

== Children ==
- Frances (Fanny) Elizabeth Dickens (1810–1848)
- Charles John Huffam Dickens (1812-1870)
- Alfred Allan Dickens (1814-1814)
- Letitia Dickens (1816–1893)
- Harriet Dickens (1819–1824)
- Frederick Dickens (1820-1868)
- Alfred Lamert Dickens (1822-1860)
- Augustus Dickens (1827-1866)

== In popular culture ==
Ger Ryan portrayed Elizabeth Dickens in the 2017 film The Man Who Invented Christmas, a story of the 1843 writing and production of her son Charles's A Christmas Carol.

== See also ==
- Dickens family
