= John Forster (biographer) =

English writer and biographer (1812–1876)

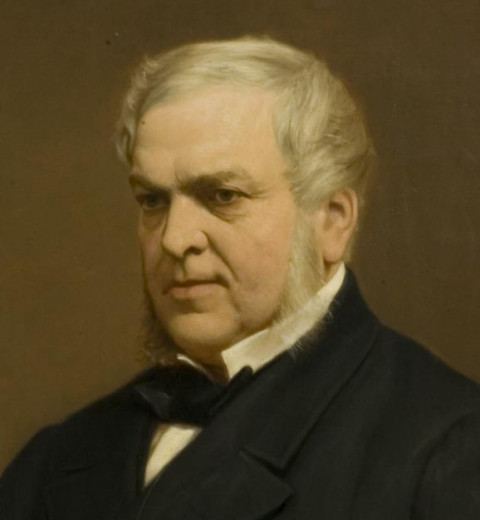
- Portrait of John Forster by Charles Edward Perugini, 1887
- Born: 2 April 1812; Newcastle upon Tyne, England
- Died: 2 February 1876 (aged 63); Kensington, England
- Occupations: Writer; biographer

John Forster (2 April 1812 – 2 February 1876) was an English writer and biographer. He was best known for publishing The Life of Charles Dickens (1872), which was the first biography published of Charles Dickens after his death in 1870. He was a personal friend of Dickens and part of Dickens's social circle, which included William Makepeace Thackeray, Wilkie Collins and Hans Christian Andersen.

== Life ==
Forster was born at "a little yellow house" in Fenkle Street, Newcastle upon Tyne, second of four children of Unitarian cattle-dealer Robert Forster (died 1836) and Mary (c. 1780-1852), daughter of a Gallowgate dairy farm keeper. Forster's great-grandfather had been "a man of some considerable substance", a landowner at Corsenside in Northumberland; his grandfather Christopher (the third son) inherited nothing, so this branch became butchers and cattle-dealers in Newcastle. Forster's father "married beneath himself" despite his wife being "a gem of a woman"; she was remembered by a nephew as "kind and affectionate", giving her impoverished sister's children cast-off clothing. The Forsters subsequently lived on Low Friar Street and at 5, Green Court, all "in the centre of old Newcastle... a jumble of houses, works and potteries". John Forster was educated in classics and in mathematics at The Royal Grammar School. Forster in 1828 matriculated at the University of Cambridge, but after only a month's residence there he moved to London, where he attended classes at University College London, and entered the Inner Temple.

In London, Forster successfully contributed to The True Sun, The Morning Chronicle and The Examiner, for which he was literary and dramatic critic. An extract of his Lives of the Statesmen of the Commonwealth (1836–1839) was published in Lardner's Cabinet Cyclopaedia. Forster subsequently published the entire work separately in 1840, with his Treatise on the Popular Progress in English History, both of which were publicly commended, and as a consequence of which Forster became reputable amongst London literary society. He therein became a friend of Leigh Hunt, Charles Lamb, W. S. Landor, Charles Dickens (every work by whom he read in manuscript), and Edward Bulwer-Lytton (whom he monetarily patronised during the latter's childhood ). Forster was engaged to Letitia Landon, but after their relationship was broken off he instead married Eliza, the widow of Henry Colburn.

Forster in 1843 was called to the bar, but he did not ever practise as a lawyer.

Forster in 1855 was appointed secretary to the Lunacy Commission and, from 1861 to 1872, held the office of a Commissioner in Lunacy. His valuable collection of manuscripts, including original copies of Charles Dickens's novels, together with his books and pictures, was bequeathed to the South Kensington Museum.

== Works ==
For some years Forster edited the Foreign Quarterly Review; in 1846, on the retirement of Charles Dickens, he took over The Daily News; and, from 1847 to 1856 he edited the Examiner. From 1836 onwards, he contributed to the Edinburgh Quarterly Review and to the Foreign Quarterly Review a variety of articles, some of which were republished in two volumes of Biographical and Historical Essays (1858).

In 1848 appeared his Life and Times of Oliver Goldsmith (revised 1854). Continuing his researches into English history under the early Stuarts, he published in 1860 the Arrest of the Five Members by Charles I: a Chapter of English History rewritten, and The Debates on the Grand Remonstrance, with an Introductory Essay on English Freedom. These were followed by his Sir John Eliot: a Biography (1864), elaborated from one of his earlier studies for the Lives of Eminent British Statesmen.

In 1868 appeared his Life of Walter Savage Landor. On the death of his friend Alexander Dyce, Forster undertook the publication of his third edition of Shakespeare. For several years he had been collecting materials for a life of Jonathan Swift, but he interrupted his studies in this direction to write his standard Life of Charles Dickens. He was a close friend of Dickens, and it is for this work that John Forster is now mainly remembered. The first volume appeared in 1872, and the biography was completed in 1874. It was clearly an important work for the late nineteenth century English novelist George Gissing, who wrote, in his diary in January 1888, that, it was "a book I constantly take up for impulse, when work at a standstill". A decade or so later, Gissing was asked to revise Forster's work, and this was published, by Chapman and Hall, in October 1902.

Towards the close of 1875 the first volume of his Life of Swift was published; and he had made some progress in the preparation of the second at the time of his death.

== In fiction ==
Forster has been fictionalised in several recent neo-Victorian novels which centre on Charles Dickens. This includes The Last Dickens by Matthew Pearl (2009), Wanting by Richard Flanagan (2008), Girl in a Blue Dress by Gaynor Arnold (2008, renamed Michael O'Rourke), Drood by Dan Simmons (2009) and the forensic examination of the genesis of Pickwick Papers, Death and Mr Pickwick by Stephen Jarvis (2014) in which Forster is cast as the major villain of the piece. He was portrayed by Justin Edwards in the 2017 film The Man Who Invented Christmas. The film portrays Forster as Dickens' unofficial business manager and engaged to a Miss Charlotte Wigmore, a fictional character. It also implies that Forster was Dickens' inspiration for the Ghost of Christmas Present.

He also appears in The Fraud by Zadie Smith.
