= Begging letter =

A begging letter is a letter to a rich person or organization, usually written by a poor person, or a person claiming to be poor, begging for money or help.

Examples of begging letters include a variant of the Nigerian 419 scam, where a letter is sent to a wealthy individual asking for financial assistance for orphaned children, emergency surgery, etc.

== Works about begging letters ==
The May 1850 edition of Household Words contained an article entitled The Begging-Letter Writer written by the novelist Charles Dickens. In the article Dickens describes examples of the many begging letters he had received over the years, and the ruses employed by their writers to gain funds from the recipients.

Silly Beggar – The World's Stupidest Begging Letters is a 2009 book by Scottish author James Spence. It is a collection of comedy letters sent to companies, together with the replies and images of items the sender received. Letters included in the book were sent to such companies as Shell, Hovis, Boots and Starbucks.
