= Insolvent Debtors (England) Act 1813 =

Act of the Parliament of the United Kingdom

- Act of Parliament
- Parliament of the United Kingdom
- Long title: An Act for the Relief of Insolvent Debtors in England.
- Citation: 53 Geo. 3. c. 102
- Territorial extent: United Kingdom

Dates
- Royal assent: 10 July 1813
- Commencement: 10 July 1813 (Note: Section 1.)
- Expired: 1 November 1818 (Note: Section 59.)
- Repealed: 5 August 1873
Other legislation
Repealed by	Statute Law Revision Act 1873

Status: Repealed

Text of statute as originally enacted

The Insolvent Debtors (England) Act 1813 (53 Geo. 3. c. 102) was an act of the Parliament of the United Kingdom passed in 1813 during the reign of King George III.

It was enacted in response to the demands on the prison system imposed by the numbers of those being incarcerated for debt, and some concern for their plight. The act created a new Court for the Relief of Insolvent Debtors that remained in existence until 1861, under the jurisdiction of a newly appointed commissioner. Those imprisoned for debt could apply to the court to be released, unless they were in trade or guilty of fraudulent or other dishonest behaviour, by reaching an agreement with their creditors that ensured a fair distribution of their present and future assets.

== Subsequent developments ==
The whole act was repealed by section 1 of, and the schedule to, the Statute Law Revision Act 1873 (36 & 37 Vict. c. 91), which came into force on 5 August 1873.

== See also ==
- UK insolvency law
- UK bankruptcy law
- History of bankruptcy law
