= English novel =

Novel as a concept in English-language literature

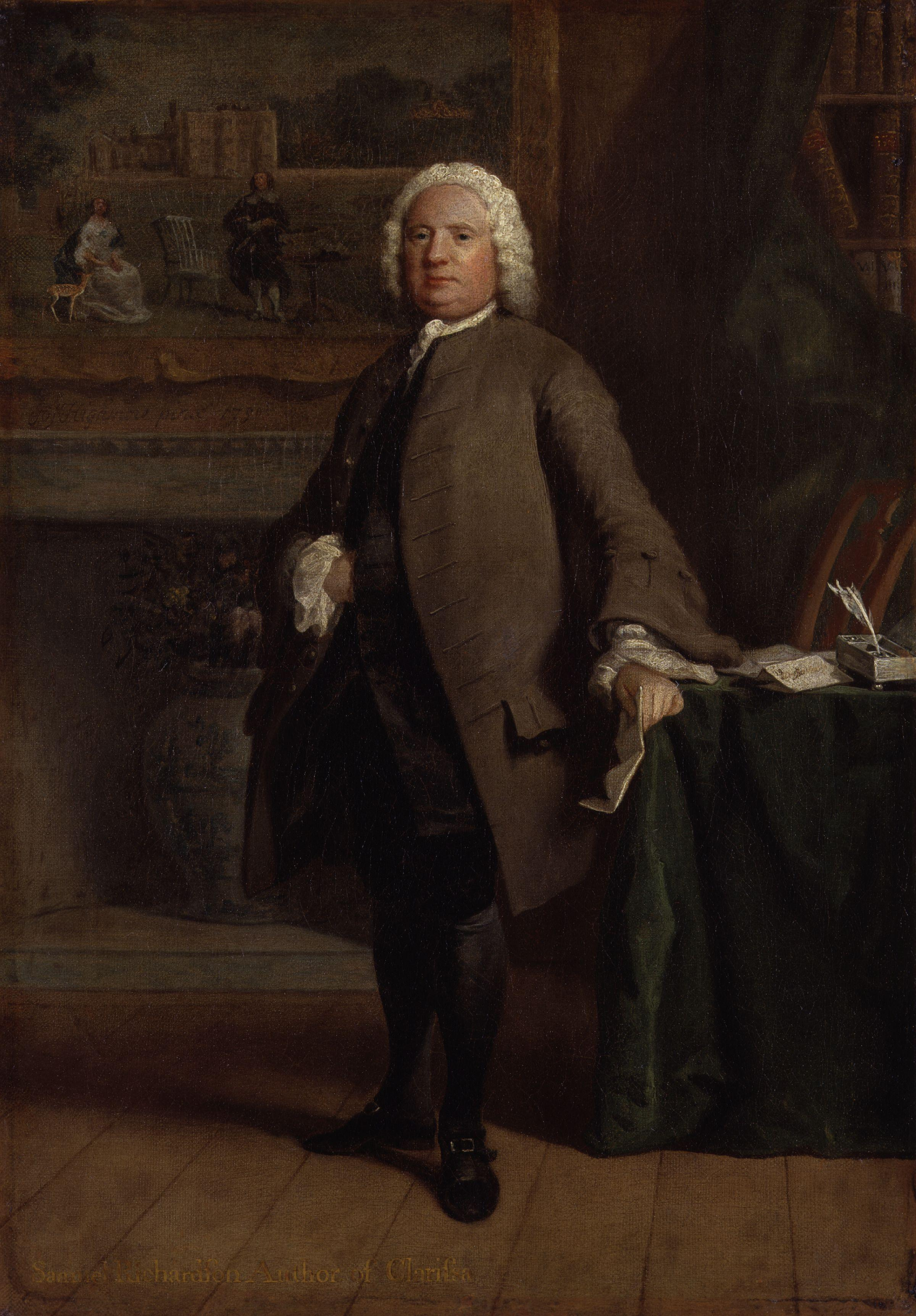
Portrait of Samuel Richardson by Joseph Highmore. National Portrait Gallery, Westminster, England.

The English novel is an important part of English literature. This article mainly concerns novels, written in English, by novelists who were born or have spent a significant part of their lives in England, Scotland, Wales, or Northern Ireland (or any part of Ireland before 1922). However, given the nature of the subject, this guideline has been applied with common sense, and reference is made to novels in other languages or novelists who are not primarily British, where appropriate.

== Early novels in English ==
Historically, the English novel has generally been seen as beginning with Daniel Defoe's Robinson Crusoe (1719) and Moll Flanders (1722), though modern scholarship cites Aphra Behn's Love-Letters Between a Nobleman and His Sister (1684) John Bunyan's The Pilgrim's Progress (1678) and Behn's Oroonoko (1688) as more likely contenders, while earlier works such as Sir Thomas Malory's Morte d'Arthur (1485), and even the "Prologue" to Geoffrey Chaucer's Canterbury Tales (c. 1400) have been suggested. Another important early novel is Gulliver's Travels (1726, amended 1735), by Irish writer and clergyman Jonathan Swift, which is both a satire of human nature, as well as a parody of travellers' tales like Robinson Crusoe. The rise of the novel as an important literary genre is generally associated with the growth of the middle class in England.

Other major 18th-century English novelists are Samuel Richardson (1689–1761), author of the epistolary novels Pamela, or Virtue Rewarded (1740) and Clarissa; or, The History of a Young Lady (1747–48); Henry Fielding (1707–1754), who wrote Joseph Andrews (1742) and The History of Tom Jones, a Foundling (1749); Laurence Sterne (1713–1768), who published Tristram Shandy in parts between 1759 and 1767; Oliver Goldsmith (1728–1774), author of The Vicar of Wakefield (1766); Tobias Smollett (1721–1771), a Scottish novelist best known for his comic picaresque novels, such as The Adventures of Peregrine Pickle (1751) and The Expedition of Humphry Clinker (1771), who influenced Charles Dickens; and Fanny Burney (1752–1840), whose novels "were enjoyed and admired by Jane Austen," wrote Evelina (1778), Cecilia (1782) and Camilla (1796).

A noteworthy aspect of both the 18th- and 19th- century novel is the way the novelist directly addressed the reader. For example, the author might interrupt his or her narrative to pass judgment on a character, or pity or praise another, and inform or remind the reader of some other relevant issue.

== Romantic period ==
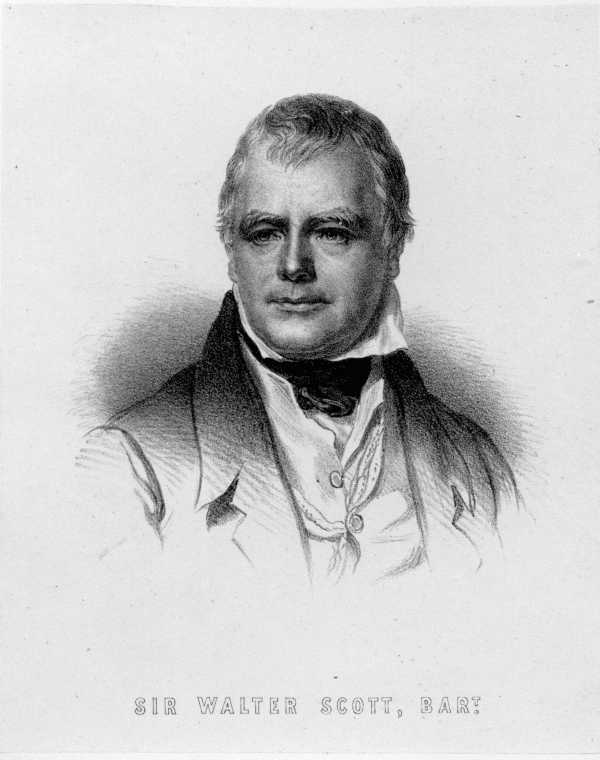
Sir Walter Scott

The phrase 'Romantic novel' has several possible meanings. Here it refers to novels written during the Romantic era in literary history, which runs from the late 18th century until the beginning of the Victorian era in 1837. But to complicate matters there are novels written in the romance tradition by novelists like Walter Scott, Nathaniel Hawthorne, George Meredith. In addition the phrase today is mostly used to refer to the popular pulp-fiction genre that focusses on romantic love. The Romantic period is especially associated with the poets William Blake, William Wordsworth, Samuel Taylor Coleridge, George Byron, Percy Shelley and John Keats, though two major novelists, Jane Austen and Walter Scott, also published in the early 19th century.

Horace Walpole's 1764 novel The Castle of Otranto invented the Gothic fiction genre. The word gothic was originally used in the sense of medieval. This genre combines "the macabre, fantastic, and supernatural" and usually involves haunted castles, graveyards and various picturesque elements. Later novelist Ann Radcliffe introduced the brooding figure of the Gothic villain which developed into the Byronic hero. Her most popular and influential work, The Mysteries of Udolpho (1794), is frequently described as the archetypal Gothic novel. Vathek (1786), by William Beckford, and The Monk (1796), by Matthew Lewis, were further notable early works in both the Gothic and horror genres.

Mary Shelley's novel Frankenstein (1818), is another important Gothic novel as well as an early example of science fiction. The vampire genre fiction began with John William Polidori's The Vampyre (1819). This short story was inspired by the life of Lord Byron and his poem The Giaour. An important later work is Varney the Vampire (1845), where many standard vampire conventions originated: Varney has fangs, leaves two puncture wounds on the neck of his victims, and has hypnotic powers and superhuman strength. Varney was also the first example of the "sympathetic vampire", who loathes his condition but is a slave to it.

Mary Shelley

Among more minor novelists in this period Maria Edgeworth (1768–1849) and Thomas Love Peacock (1785–1866) are worthy of comment. Edgeworth's novel Castle Rackrent (1800) is "the first fully developed regional novel in English" as well as "the first true historical novel in English" and an important influence on Walter Scott. Peacock was primarily a satirist in novels such as Nightmare Abbey (1818) and The Misfortunes of Elphin (1829).

Jane Austen's (1775–1817) works critique the novels of sensibility of the second half of the 18th century and are part of the transition to 19th-century realism. Her plots, though fundamentally comic, highlight the dependence of women on marriage to secure social standing and economic security. Austen brings to light the hardships women faced, who usually did not inherit money, could not work and where their only chance in life depended on the man they married. She reveals not only the difficulties women faced in her day, but also what was expected of men and of the careers they had to follow. This she does with wit and humour and with endings where all characters, good or bad, receive exactly what they deserve. Her work brought her little personal fame and only a few positive reviews during her lifetime, but the publication in 1869 of her nephew's A Memoir of Jane Austen introduced her to a wider public, and by the 1940s she had become accepted as a major writer. The second half of the 20th century saw a proliferation of Austen scholarship and the emergence of a Janeite fan culture. Austen's works include Pride and Prejudice (1813) Sense and Sensibility (1811), Mansfield Park, Persuasion and Emma.

The other major novelist at the beginning of the early 19th century was Sir Walter Scott (1771–1832), who was not only a highly successful British novelist but "the greatest single influence on fiction in the 19th century ... [and] a European figure". Scott established the genre of the historical novel with his series of Waverley Novels, including Waverley (1814), The Antiquary (1816), and The Heart of Midlothian (1818). However, Austen is today widely read and the source for films and television series, while Scott is less often read.

== Victorian novel ==
It was in the Victorian era (1837–1901) that the novel became the leading literary genre in English. A number of women novelists were successful in the 19th century, although they often had to use a masculine pseudonym. At the beginning of the 19th century most novels were published in three volumes. However, monthly serialization was revived with the publication of Charles Dickens' Pickwick Papers in twenty parts between April 1836 and November 1837. Demand was high for each episode to introduce some new element, whether it was a plot twist or a new character, so as to maintain the readers' interest. Both Dickens and Thackeray frequently published this way.

After Carlyle, the poetic, prophetic, and visionary possibilities of the novel are fully awakened.

— Kathleen Tillotson, British scholar

In the 1830s and '40s, novelists began to show the influence of social critics on their work, especially Thomas Carlyle, who raised the "Condition-of-England Question" to describe "the social and political upheavals which followed the Reform Act of 1832". In response, novelists wrote "Condition of England novels", which were in many ways a reaction to rapid industrialization, and the social, political and economic issues associated with it, and were a means of commenting on abuses of government and industry and the suffering of the poor, who were not profiting from England's economic prosperity. Stories of the working-class poor were directed toward the middle class to help create sympathy and promote change. An early example is Charles Dickens' Oliver Twist (1837–38).

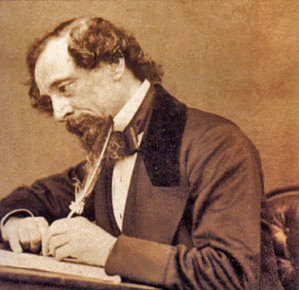
Charles Dickens

Charles Dickens emerged on the literary scene in the 1830s with the two novels already mentioned. Dickens wrote vividly about London life and struggles of the poor, but in a good-humoured fashion, accessible to readers of all classes. One of his most popular works to this day is A Christmas Carol (1843). In more recent years Dickens has been most admired for his later novels, such as Dombey and Son (1846–48), Great Expectations (1860–61), Bleak House (1852–53), Little Dorrit (1855–57), and Our Mutual Friend (1864–65). An early rival to Dickens was William Makepeace Thackeray, who during the Victorian period ranked second only to him, but he is now much less read and is known almost exclusively for Vanity Fair (1847). In that novel he satirizes whole swaths of humanity while retaining a light touch. It features his most memorable character, the engagingly roguish Becky Sharp.

The Brontë sisters were other significant novelists in the 1840s and 1850s. Their novels caused a sensation when they were first published and were subsequently accepted as classics. They had written compulsively from early childhood and were first published, at their own expense, in 1846 as poets under the pseudonyms Currer, Ellis, and Acton Bell. The sisters returned to prose, producing a novel each the following year: Charlotte's Jane Eyre, Emily's Wuthering Heights and Anne's Agnes Grey. Later, Anne's The Tenant of Wildfell Hall (1848) and Charlotte's Villette (1853) were published. Elizabeth Gaskell was also a successful writer and her first novel, Mary Barton, was published anonymously in 1848. Gaskell's North and South contrasts the lifestyle in the industrial north of England with the wealthier south. Even though her writing conforms to Victorian conventions, Gaskell usually frames her stories as critiques of contemporary attitudes: her early works focused on factory work in the Midlands. She always emphasised the role of women, with complex narratives and dynamic female characters.

Anthony Trollope (1815–82) was one of the most successful, prolific, and respected English novelists of the Victorian era. Some of his best-loved works are set in the imaginary county of Barsetshire, including The Warden (1855) and Barchester Towers (1857). He also wrote perceptive novels on political, social, and gender issues, and on other topical matters, including The Way with Live Now (1875). Trollope's novels portrayed the lives of the landowning and professional classes of early Victorian England.

George Eliot's (Mary Ann Evans) (1819–80) first novel Adam Bede was published in 1859. Her works, especially Middlemarch 1871–72), are important examples of literary realism, and are admired for their combination of high Victorian literary detail combined with an intellectual breadth that removes them from the narrow geographic confines they often depict.

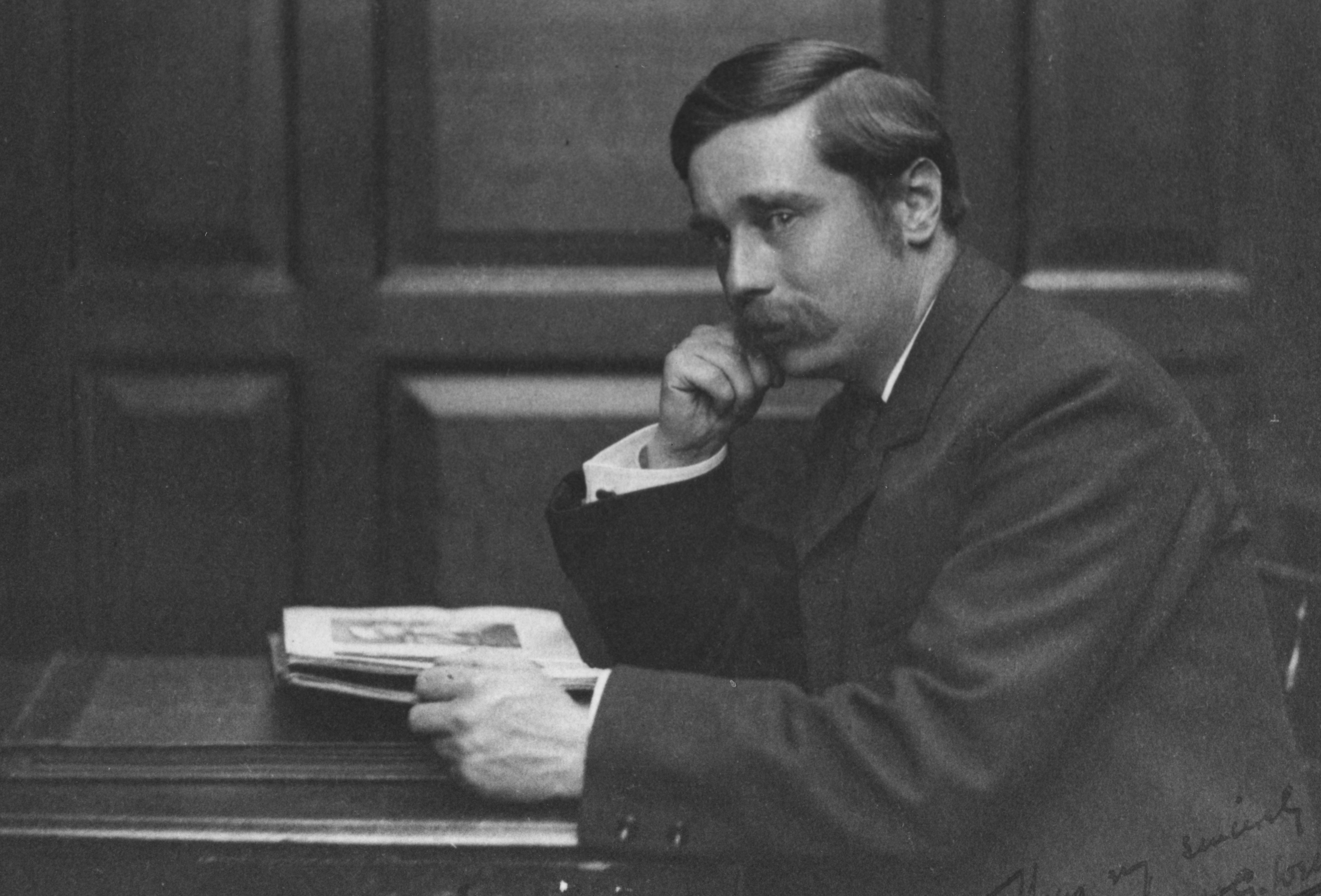
H. G. Wells studying in London, taken c. 1890

An interest in rural matters and the changing social and economic situation of the countryside is seen in the novels of Thomas Hardy (1840–1928). A Victorian realist, in the tradition of George Eliot, he was also influenced both in his novels and poetry by Romanticism, especially by William Wordsworth. Charles Darwin is another important influence on Thomas Hardy. Like Charles Dickens he was also highly critical of much in Victorian society, though Hardy focused more on a declining rural society. While Hardy wrote poetry throughout his life and regarded himself primarily as a poet, his first collection was not published until 1898, so that initially he gained fame as the author of such novels as, Far from the Madding Crowd (1874), The Mayor of Casterbridge (1886), Tess of the d'Urbervilles (1891), and Jude the Obscure (1895). He ceased writing novels following adverse criticism of this last novel. In novels such as The Mayor of Casterbridge and Tess of the d'Urbervilles Hardy attempts to create modern works in the genre of tragedy, that are modelled on the Greek drama, especially Aeschylus and Sophocles, though in prose, not poetry, a novel not drama, and with characters of low social standing, not nobility. Another significant late 19th-century novelist is George Gissing (1857–1903) who published 23 novels between 1880 and 1903. His best known novel is New Grub Street (1891).

Important developments occurred in genre fiction in this era. Although pre-dated by John Ruskin's The King of the Golden River in 1841, the history of the modern fantasy genre is generally said to begin with George MacDonald, the influential author of The Princess and the Goblin and Phantastes (1858). William Morris was a popular English poet who also wrote several fantasy novels during the latter part of the nineteenth century. Wilkie Collins' epistolary novel The Moonstone (1868), is generally considered the first detective novel in the English language, while The Woman in White is regarded as one of the finest sensation novels. H. G. Wells's (1866–1946) writing career began in the 1890s with science fiction novels like The Time Machine (1895), and The War of the Worlds (1898) which describes an invasion of late Victorian England by Martians. Wells is seen, along with Frenchman Jules Verne (1828–1905), as inventing the scientific romance. He also wrote realistic fiction about the lower middle class in novels such as Kipps (1905) and The History of Mr Polly (1910).

== 20th century ==
The major novelists writing in Britain at the start of the 20th century were an Irishman James Joyce (1882–1941) and two immigrants, American Henry James (1843–1916) and Pole Joseph Conrad (1857–1924). The modernist tradition in the novel, with its emphasis "towards the ever more minute and analytic exposition of mental life", begins with James and Conrad, in novels such as The Ambassadors (1903), The Golden Bowl (1904) and Lord Jim (1900). Other important early modernists were Dorothy Richardson (1873–1957), whose novel Pointed Roof (1915), is one of the earliest example of the stream of consciousness technique, and D. H. Lawrence (1885–1930), who wrote with understanding about the social life of the lower and middle classes and the personal life of those who could not adapt to the social norms of his time. Sons and Lovers (1913), is widely regarded as his earliest masterpiece. There followed The Rainbow (1915), though it was immediately seized by the police, and its sequel Women in Love published in 1920. Lawrence attempted to explore human emotions more deeply than his contemporaries and challenged the boundaries of the acceptable treatment of sexual issues, most notably in Lady Chatterley's Lover, which was privately published in Florence in 1928. However, the unexpurgated version of this novel was not published until 1959. In 1922 Irishman James Joyce's important modernist novel Ulysses appeared. Set during one day in Dublin in June 1904, the novel has been called "a demonstration and summation of the entire movement." In it Joyce creates parallels with Homer's epic poem the Odyssey.

Another significant modernist in the 1920s was Virginia Woolf (1882–1941), who was an influential feminist, member of the Bloomsbury Group, and a major stylistic innovator associated with the stream-of-consciousness technique. Her novels include Mrs Dalloway (1925), To the Lighthouse (1927), Orlando: A Biography (1928), and The Waves (1931). Her essay collection A Room of One's Own (1929) contains her famous dictum: "A woman must have money and a room of her own if she is to write fiction".

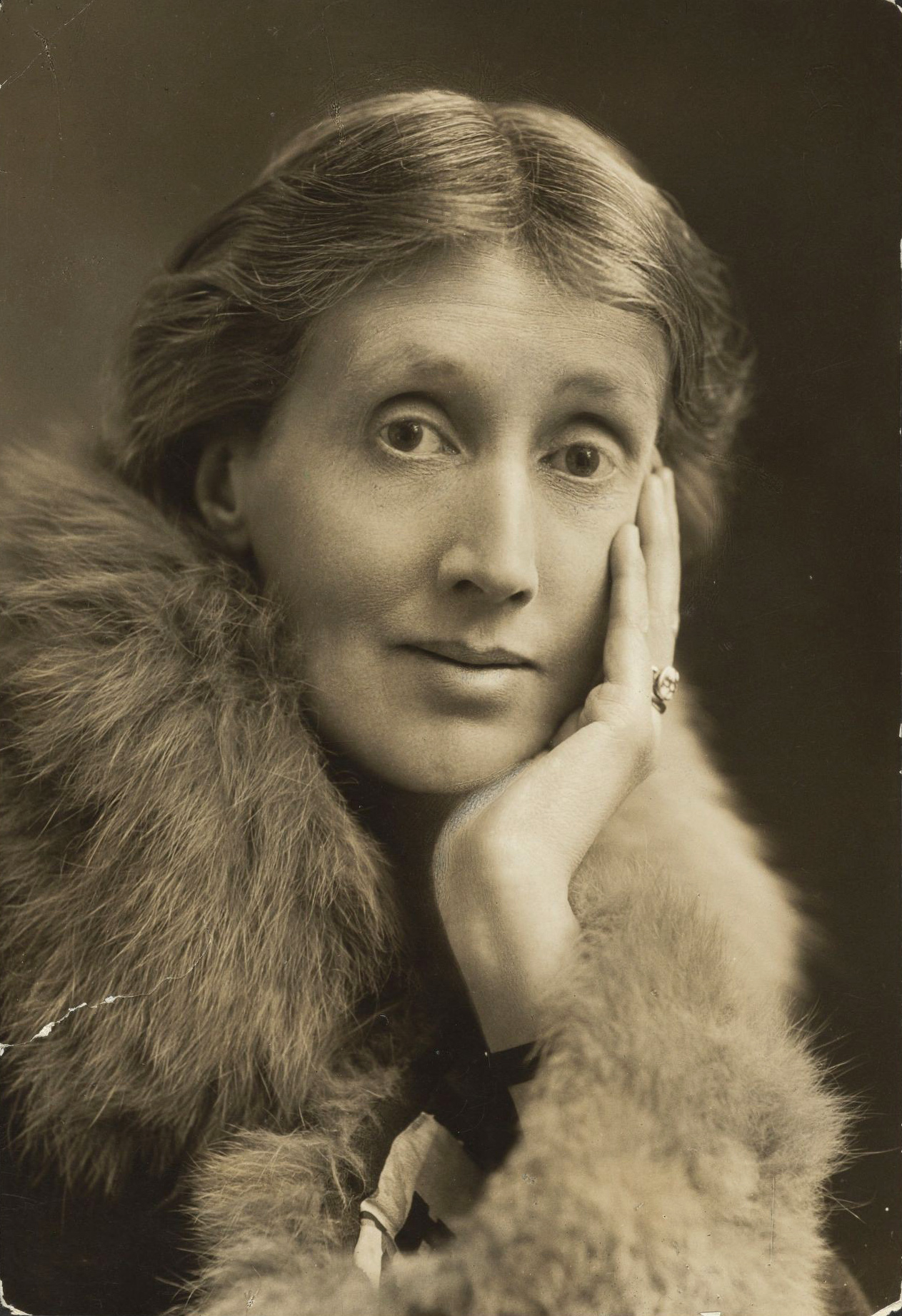
Virginia Woolf

But while modernism was to become an important literary movement in the early decades of the new century, there were also many fine novelists who were not strictly modernists. These include E. M. Forster (1879–1970), John Galsworthy (1867–1933) (Nobel Prize in Literature, 1932), whose novels include The Forsyte Saga, Arnold Bennett (1867–1931) author of The Old Wives' Tale, and H. G. Wells (1866–1946), though Forster's work is "frequently regarded as containing both modernist and Victorian elements". E. M. Forster's A Passage to India (1924), reflected challenges to imperialism, while his earlier works, such as A Room with a View (1908) and Howards End (1910), examined the restrictions and hypocrisy of Edwardian society in England. The most popular British writer of the early years of the 20th century was arguably Rudyard Kipling (1865–1936), a highly versatile writer of novels, short stories and poems and to date the youngest ever recipient of the Nobel Prize for Literature (1907).

A significant English writer in the 1930s and 1940s was George Orwell (1903–50), who is especially remembered for his satires of totalitarianism, Nineteen Eighty-Four (1949) and Animal Farm (1945). Evelyn Waugh (1903–66) satirised the "bright young things" of the 1920s and 1930s, notably in A Handful of Dust (1934) and Decline and Fall (1928), while Brideshead Revisited (1945) has a theological basis, setting out to examine the effect of divine grace on its main characters. Irishwoman and Bloomsbury Group member Elizabeth Bowen is known for her novels about the Irish Protestant gentry, such as The Death of the Heart (1938) and London during World War II bombing raids, The Heat of the Day (1948). Aldous Huxley (1894–1963) published his famous dystopia Brave New World in 1932, the same year as John Cowper Powys's (1872–1963) A Glastonbury Romance. Samuel Beckett (1906–89) published his first major work, the novel Murphy in 1938. This same year Graham Greene's (1904–91) first major novel Brighton Rock was published. Then in 1939 James Joyce published Finnegans Wake. In this work Joyce creates a special language to express the consciousness of a character who is dreaming.

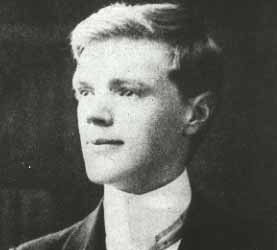
D. H. Lawrence, 1906

Graham Greene was an important novelist whose works span the 1930s to the 1980s. Greene was a convert to Catholicism and his novels explore the ambivalent moral and political issues of the modern world. Notable for an ability to combine serious literary acclaim with broad popularity, his novels include, The Heart of the Matter (1948), A Burnt-Out Case (1961), and The Human Factor (1978). Evelyn Waugh's (1903–1966) career also continued after World War II, and in "1961 he completed his most considerable work, a trilogy about the war entitled Sword of Honour. In 1947 Malcolm Lowry published Under the Volcano. One of the most influential novels of the immediate post-war period was William Cooper's (1910–2002) naturalistic Scenes from Provincial Life (1950), which was a conscious rejection of the modernist tradition. Other novelists writing in the 1950s and later were: Anthony Powell (1905–2000) whose twelve-volume cycle of novels A Dance to the Music of Time (1951–75), is a comic examination of movements and manners, power and passivity in English political, cultural, and military life in the mid-20th century; comic novelist Kingsley Amis is best known for his academic satire Lucky Jim (1954); Nobel Prize laureate William Golding's allegorical novel Lord of the Flies (1954), explores how culture created by man fails, using as an example a group of British schoolboys marooned on a deserted island. Philosopher Iris Murdoch was a prolific writer of novels that deal with such things as sexual relationships, morality, and the power of the unconscious. Her works include Under the Net (1954), The Black Prince (1973) and The Green Knight (1993). Scottish writer Muriel Spark also began publishing in the 1950s. She pushed the boundaries of realism in her novels. Her first, The Comforters (1957), concerns a woman who becomes aware that she is a character in a novel; The Prime of Miss Jean Brodie (1961), jumps forward at the end to reveal the fates that befell its characters. Anthony Burgess is especially remembered for his dystopian novel A Clockwork Orange (1962), set in the not-too-distant future, which was made into a film by Stanley Kubrick in 1971. In the entirely different genre of Gothic fantasy Mervyn Peake (1911–1968) published his highly successful Gormenghast trilogy between 1946 and 1959.

Immigrant authors played a major role in post-war literature. Doris Lessing (1919) from Southern Rhodesia (now Zimbabwe), published her first novel The Grass is Singing in 1950, after immigrating to England. She initially wrote about her African experiences. Lessing soon became a dominant presence in the English literary scene, frequently publishing right through the century, and won the Nobel prize for literature in 2007. Salman Rushdie (born 1947) is another among a number of post Second World War writers from the former British colonies who permanently settled in Britain. Rushdie achieved fame with Midnight's Children 1981, which was awarded both the James Tait Black Memorial Prize and Booker Prize, and named Booker of Bookers in 1993. His most controversial novel The Satanic Verses (1989), was inspired in part by the life of Muhammad. V. S. Naipaul (1932–2018), born in Trinidad, wrote among other things A House for Mr. Biswas (1961) and A Bend in the River (1979). Naipaul won the Nobel Prize in Literature. Also from the West Indies George Lamming (1927–2022) is best remembered for In the Castle of the Skin (1953). Another important immigrant writer Kazuo Ishiguro (born 1954) was born in Japan, but his parents immigrated to Britain when he was six. His works include The Remains of the Day {1989) and Never Let Me Go (2005). Ishiguro won the Nobel Prize in Literature in 2017.

Scotland has in the late 20th-century produced several important novelists, including James Kelman (born 1946), who like Samuel Beckett can create humour out of the most grim situations. How Late it Was, How Late (1994), won the Booker Prize that year; A. L. Kennedy (born 1965) whose 2007 novel Day was named Book of the Year in the Costa Book Awards. In 2007 she won the Austrian State Prize for European Literature; Alasdair Gray (1934–2019) whose Lanark: A Life in Four Books (1981) is a dystopian fantasy set in his home town Glasgow. Another contemporary Scot is Irvine Welsh, whose novel Trainspotting (1993), gives a brutal depiction of the lives of working class Edinburgh drug users.

Angela Carter (1940–1992) was a novelist and journalist, known for her feminist, magical realism, and picaresque works. Writing from the 1960s until the 1980s, her novels include, The Infernal Desire Machines of Doctor Hoffman (1972) and Nights at the Circus (1984). Margaret Drabble (born 1939) is a novelist, biographer, and critic, who has published from the 1960s until this century. Her older sister, A. S. Byatt (born 1936) is best known for Possession published in 1990.

Among popular novelists Daphne Du Maurier wrote Rebecca, a mystery novel, in 1938 and W. Somerset Maugham’s (1874–1965) Of Human Bondage (1915), a strongly autobiographical novel, is generally agreed to be his masterpiece. In genre fiction Agatha Christie was an important writer of crime novels, short stories, and plays, best remembered for her 80 detective novels and her successful West End theatre plays. Christie's novels include Murder on the Orient Express (1934), Death on the Nile (1937), and And Then There Were None (1939). Another popular writer during the Golden Age of detective fiction was Dorothy L. Sayers, while Georgette Heyer created the historical romance genre.

== Contemporary novelists ==
Martin Amis (1949 to 2023) was one of the most prominent of contemporary British novelists. His best-known novels are Money (1984) and London Fields (1989). Pat Barker (born 1943) has won many awards for her fiction.

Novelist and screenwriter Ian McEwan (born 1948) is another of contemporary Britain's most highly regarded writers. His works include The Cement Garden (1978) and Enduring Love (1997), which was made into a film. In 1998 McEwan won the Booker Prize with Amsterdam, while Atonement (2001) was made into an Oscar-winning film. McEwan was awarded the Jerusalem Prize in 2011. Jeanette Winterson’s (born 1959) novels explore themes of sexuality and religion, such as Oranges Are Not the Only Fruit (1985) and Sexing the Cherry (1989).

Zadie Smith's (born 1975) Whitbread Book Award winning novel White Teeth (2000), mixes pathos and humour, focusing on the later lives of two war time friends in London. Julian Barnes (born 1946) is another successful living novelist, who won the 2011 Man Booker Prize for his book The Sense of an Ending, while three of his earlier books had been shortlisted for the Booker Prize.

Monica Ali came to prominence in 2003 with the acclaimed novel Brick Lane. A chronicler of everyday life in multicultural Britain, Ali was hailed by critics and awarded several awards for the novel including being shortlisted for the Man Booker Prize for Fiction.

One of the more ambitious novelists to emerge in contemporary English literature is David Mitchell whose far-reaching novel Cloud Atlas (2004) spans from the 19th century into the future.

In the early 21st century an outstanding concern with historical fiction has been noted. Hilary Mantel (1952-2022) had success with the critically acclaimed historical novel Wolf Hall (2009).

== Survey ==
In 2003 the BBC carried out a UK survey entitled The Big Read in order to find the "nation's best-loved novel" of all time, with works by English novelists Tolkien, Austen, Pullman, Adams and Rowling making up the top five on the list.

== Famous novelists (alphabetical order) ==
- Amis, Kingsley
- Amis, Martin
- Austen, Jane
- Barnes, Julian
- Becket, Samuel
- Bowen, Elizabeth
- Brontë, Anne
- Brontë, Charlotte
- Brontë, Emily
- Burney, Fanny, later Madame D'Arblay
- Butler, Samuel
- Carroll, Lewis
- Collins, Wilkie
- Conan Doyle, Arthur
- Conrad, Joseph
- Defoe, Daniel
- Dickens, Charles
- Disraeli, Benjamin
- Du Maurier, Daphne
- Eliot, George
- Fielding, Henry
- Ford, Ford Madox
- Forster, E. M.
- Forster, Margaret
- Gaskell, Elizabeth
- Gissing, George
- Goldsmith, Oliver
- Greene, Graham
- Hardy, Thomas
- Huxley, Aldous
- Ishiguro, Kazuo
- James, Henry
- Joyce, James
- Kipling, Rudyard
- Lawrence, D. H.
- Lessing, Doris
- Lewis, C. S.
- Lewis, Wyndham
- Lowry, Malcolm
- Meredith, George
- Murdoch, Iris
- Naipaul, V. S.
- Oliphant, Margaret, traditionally known as Mrs Oliphant
- Orwell, George
- Powell, Anthony
- Powys, John Cowper
- Powys, T. F.
- Pullman, Philip
- Reade, Charles
- Richardson, Dorothy
- Richardson, Samuel
- Rushdie, Salman
- Sackville-West, Vita
- Scott, Walter
- Shelley, Mary
- Smith, Charlotte Turner
- Smollett, Tobias
- Sterne, Laurence
- Stevenson, Robert Louis
- Swift, Jonathan
- Thackeray, William
- Tolkien, J. R. R.
- Trollope, Anthony
- Ward, Mary, traditionally known as Mrs Humphry Ward
- Waugh, Evelyn
- Wells, H. G.
- Wilde, Oscar
- Winterson, Jeanette
- Woolf, Virginia
- Wyndham, John

== See also ==
- Novel
- List of English novelists
- List of English writers
- List of literary movements
- American novel
- British regional literature
- British literature
- English literature
- Industrial novel
- Modernism
- Postmodern literature
