= Rose Maylie =

Fictional character in Oliver Twist

Rose Fleming Maylie
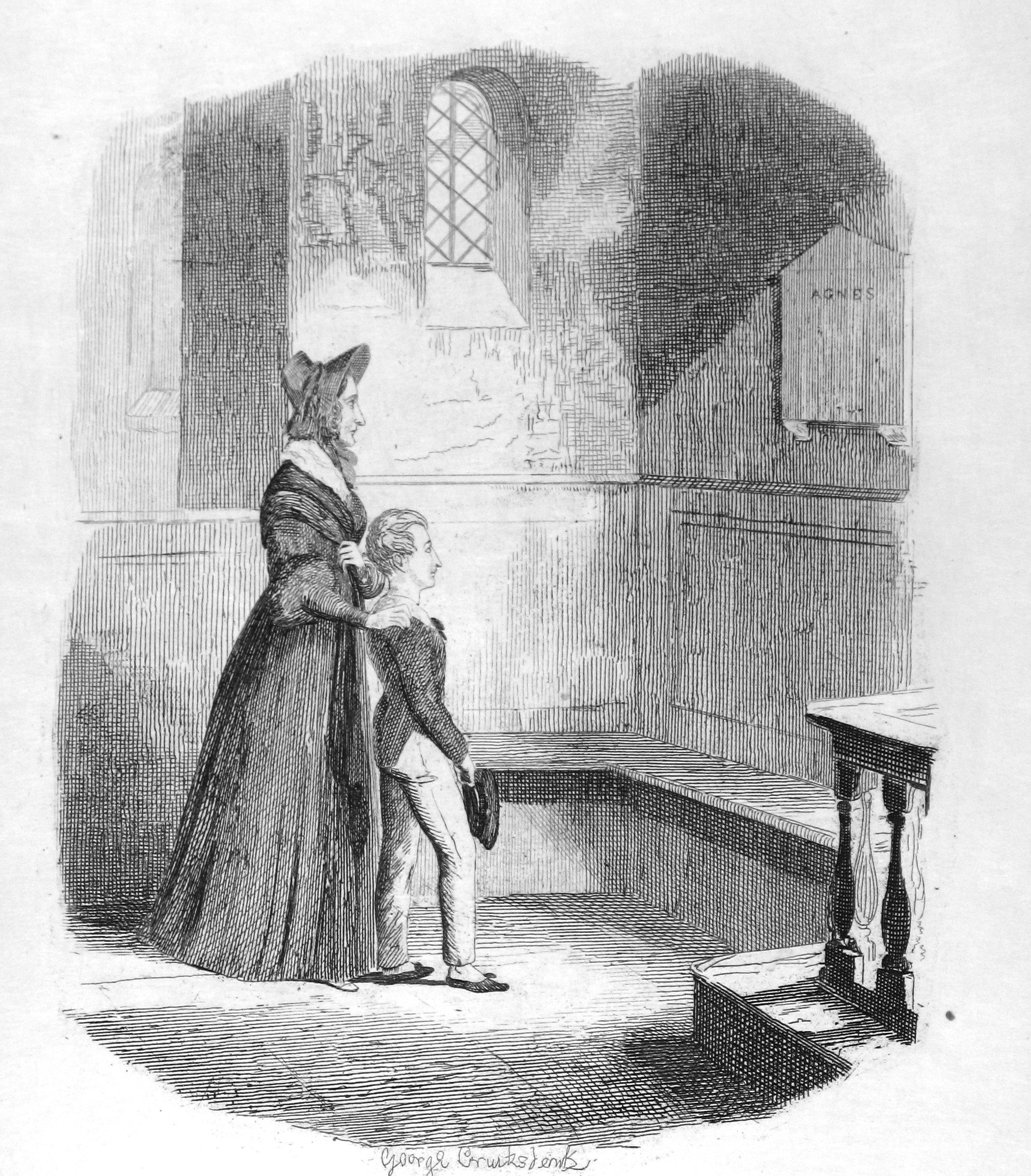
- Rose and Oliver visit the memorial to Oliver's mother
- Created by: Charles Dickens
- Portrayed by: Lettice Fairfax (1905) Esther Ralston (1922); Barbara Kent (1933); Eleanor David (1982); Gay Cameron (1962); Lysette Anthony (1985); Olivia Caffery (1997); Keira Knightley (1999); Morven Christie (2007)

In-universe information
- Gender: Female
- Family: Agnes Fleming (sister, deceased); Mrs Maylie (adoptive mother); Oliver Twist (nephew); Captain Fleming (father, deceased)
- Spouse: Harry Maylie

Rose Fleming Maylie is a fictional character in Charles Dickens' 1838 novel Oliver Twist who is eventually discovered to be the title character's maternal aunt. Though she plays a significant role in the novel, she is often omitted from dramatisations of the story.

== Role ==
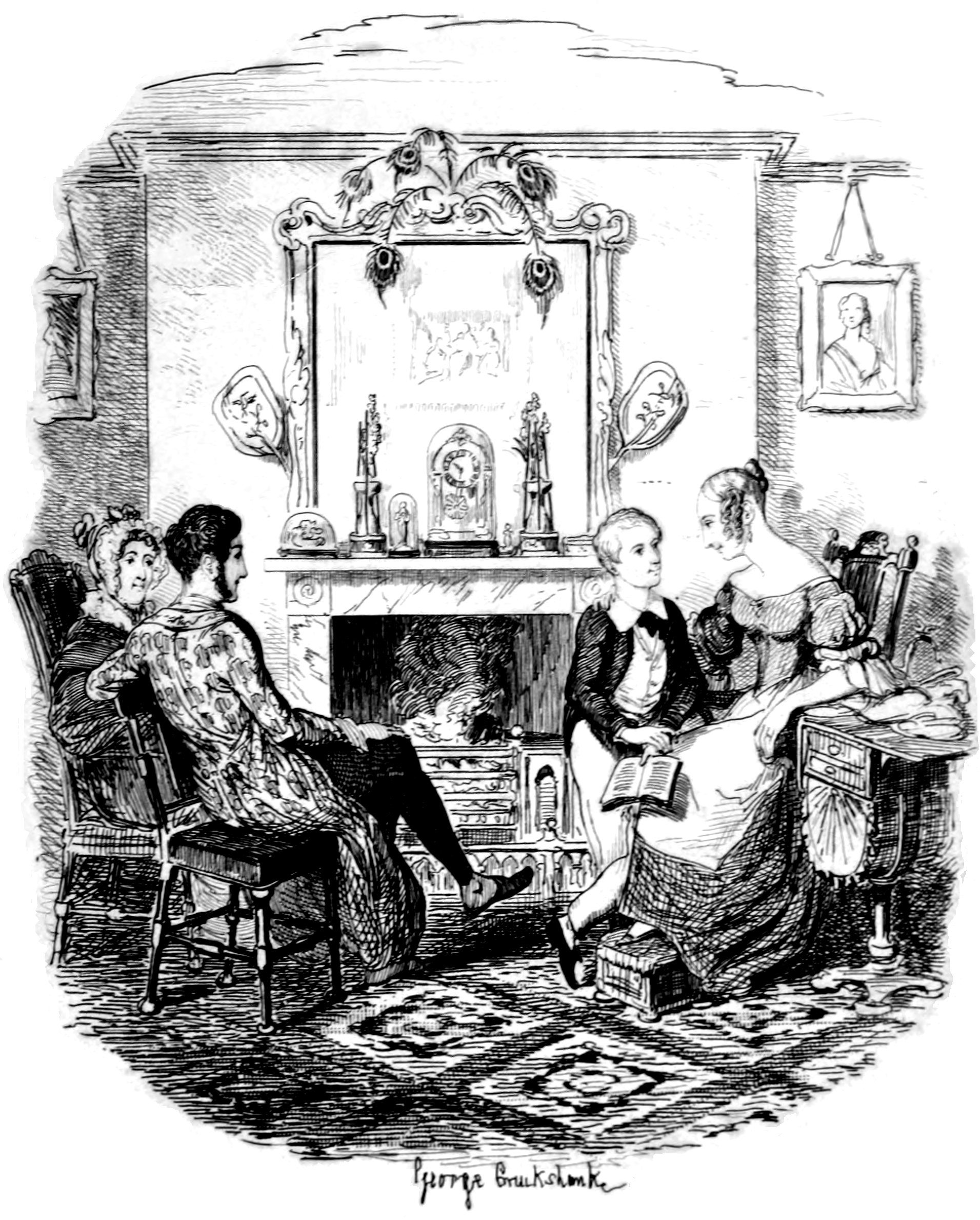
Rose Maylie and Oliver

Rose is portrayed as pure, innocent, and beautiful. Seventeen years old at the time of the novel's events, she is set up as a dramatic foil to Nancy who is around the same age and sees her own degradation in contrast to Rose.

Rose is an orphan whose original surname was Fleming. She is raised from childhood by Mrs. Maylie, who adopted her from a poor family who were looking after her. She refers to Rose as her niece. Rose is haunted by the thought that she may be illegitimate and so she rejects the suit of Mrs. Maylie's son Harry for fear that marriage to her may harm his career in the church.

Bill Sikes and Toby Crackit, two thieves, break into the Maylies' house, accompanied by Oliver, whom they use to get access as he is small enough to climb through a window. Oliver is shot and wounded by Giles, the butler of the Maylies. When the wounded Oliver returns later, Rose takes pity on him and, along with Mrs. Maylie, takes him to their country home to live with them.

During this time, Rose becomes seriously ill and is apparently on the verge of death. Her illness affects everyone around her, including Oliver and Harry. She eventually recovers.

Later, Rose learns about Oliver's plight from Nancy. She offers to help Nancy escape from Sikes, but Nancy refuses to leave him. Rose teams up with Mr Brownlow to rescue Oliver. It is later revealed that she is Oliver's aunt. Her sister Agnes Fleming was Oliver's mother. Like Oliver, she was a victim of Monks' plotting. After this revelation, Harry Maylie again proposes to her, stressing that he had given up his career prospects to be with her alone. She finally accepts his proposal, and the couple are married.

== Notable portrayals ==
Rose Maylie is completely omitted from the musical Oliver! and the film thereof. She is also missing from the 1948 and 2005 film versions of the novel. Often Rose's familial relationships differ from those of the original novel, with Mr. Brownlow (with whom she had no connection before bonding over their acquaintances with Oliver in the novel) occasionally appearing as her uncle or adopted guardian.

In the stage performance at His Majesty’s Theatre, London in 1905, Rose was portrayed by Lettice Fairfax.

In the 1922 film, she is portrayed by Esther Ralston.

In the 1933 film, she is played by Barbara Kent.

In the 1962 miniseries, she is played by Gay Cameron.

In the 1982 television film, she is played by Eleanor David.

In the 1985 miniseries, she is played by Lysette Anthony who also plays her sister Agnes.

In the 1997 Disney television film, she is played by Olivia Caffrey. Her relationship with Oliver is different from most versions. In this version, she is Oliver's first cousin once removed.

In the 1999 miniseries of Oliver Twist, Rose is played by English actress Keira Knightley.

In the 2007 miniseries, Rose is played by Scottish actress Morven Christie.
