= Oliver Twist (2007 TV series) =

2007 British television series

- Based on: Oliver Twist by Charles Dickens
- Written by: Sarah Phelps
- Directed by: Coky Giedroyc
- Starring: William Miller; Adam Arnold; Tom Hardy; Timothy Spall; Julian Rhind Tutt
- Theme music composer: Martin Phipps
- Country of origin: United Kingdom
- Original language: English
- No. of series: 1
- No. of episodes: 5

Production
- Executive producers: Kate Harwood; Rebecca Eaton
- Producer: Sarah Brown
- Cinematography: Matt Gray
- Running time: 180 minutes
- Production company: WGBH productions for BBC

Original release
- Network: BBC One
- Release: 18 December – 22 December 2007

Oliver Twist is a 2007 British television adaptation of Charles Dickens' 1838 novel Oliver Twist, written by Sarah Phelps and directed by Coky Giedroyc. It consists of five episodes, broadcast on BBC One from 18 to 22 December 2007. It aired on PBS' Masterpiece Classic in the United States on 15 and 22 February 2009, in two ninety-minute installments. In Australia, ABC1 also opted to air this series as a two-part special each Sunday at 8:30 pm from 20 December 2009.

== Production ==
Filming took place in May 2007, with the scene at the workhouse where Oliver asks "Please, sir, I want some more" being filmed at The Historic Dockyard in Chatham.

== Plot summary ==
A heavily pregnant woman makes her way to a workhouse in Mudfog where she gives birth to a boy and subsequently dies. The Beadle, Mr Bumble names the boy Oliver Twist.

10 years later, Oliver makes the mistake of asking for more gruel. He is subsequently sold to work with an undertaker, Mr Sowerberry but runs away following harsh treatment from another apprentice named Noah Claypole. Meanwhile, Mr Bumble and his assistant, the Widow Corney are visited by a mysterious man named Mr Monks, who seems interested in learning about Oliver. Oliver escapes to London where he meets a young pickpocket named Jack Dawkins, better known as the Artful Dodger. Dodger brings Oliver to his gang led by Fagin. Oliver also earns the affections of Nancy, a former pupil of Fagin's and also meets her brutal lover, Bill Sikes.

A few days later, Dodger takes Oliver to teach him how to pick pockets. He steals a wallet from a gentleman named Mr Brownlow, however, a crowd start chasing Oliver, believing him to be the thief. On Sikes' urging, Fagin attends court where Oliver does not 'peach' on Dodger and Brownlow vouches for Oliver and decides to make amends by giving him a home. Oliver becomes acquainted with Mrs Bedwin, Brownlow's housekeeper and Rose Maylie. Rose Maylie reveals that Brownlow looked after her and her sister, Agnes, who has been missing for years.

Fagin and Sikes worry that Oliver could still bring down the authorities onto them. They decide to use Nancy to bring him back. Sometime later, Oliver receives a letter from an anonymous person stating that he will need to meet them to learn more about his mother. Oliver plans to do so when he is sent by Brownlow to send some books back to the bookseller. When he does, he is entrapped in a cell by Sikes, Fagin and a reluctant Nancy. It is soon revealed that Monks has been plotting with Fagin to make a criminal out of Oliver and also to kill him. Monks is actually Oliver's half-brother who intends to disinherit him from a will left by his late father. Sikes and Fagin decide to take Oliver to burgle a house. Oliver is shot by one of the residents and taken back to Fagin's for treatment.

Monks meanwhile visits Brownlow, who addresses him as Edward and is revealed to be his grandfather, feigning sympathy for the missing Oliver. He soon returns to Mudfog in order to obtain proof of Oliver's identity from Bumble and the Widow Corney - a locket. Nancy has come to care for Oliver and regrets her part in bringing him back. She overhears a conversation between Monks and Fagin in which the former orders to latter to kill Oliver, or he himself will do it. Nancy meets with Brownlow and Rose to warn them of Monks and Fagin, keeping Sikes out of it due to her love for him. Rose believes Nancy, but Brownlow does not - he believes that Oliver is a criminal. Dodger was sent by Fagin to spy on Nancy and reports to Fagin that she has peached. However, Sikes overhears this and brutally murders Nancy.

Sikes later goes to Fagin's den to abduct Oliver, intending to use him to convince the authorities that he (Sikes) did not kill Nancy. Brownlow brings the police to Fagin's den in hopes of finding Oliver. When they do not find him, they begin to question Fagin, who they suspect has killed Oliver. Fagin confirms that Monks was the one who wanted Oliver dead and that Sikes has taken him. The police remain unconvinced and arrest Fagin. Sikes brings Oliver into a wooded area but suddenly starts being haunted by Nancy's ghost and decides to run back to London.

Meanwhile, Monks arrives back at Brownlow's house, where Brownlow and Rose reveal that they have discovered that he had been to Mudfog, and that his true intentions were to try and kill Oliver. When Monks is searched, Oliver's mother's locket and a document are discovered on his person, revealing that Agnes was indeed Oliver's mother. Brownlow disowns Monks and has him sent to the West Indies, deciding that Oliver should inherit all the money left by his and Monks' father. Dodger visits Fagin in prison - Fagin asks him to bring Oliver to vouch for him in front of the magistrate.

On arriving back to London, Sikes is chased by a mob into the sewers of London. He still continues to be haunted by Nancy so decides to hang himself. Oliver who has managed to escape from Sikes is asked by Dodger to help Fagin, but Oliver refuses and returns home to Brownlow and Rose. Fagin is sentenced to death by hanging. Dodger finds Bullseye, Sikes' dog and walks away with him into the streets of London, showing signs of becoming like Sikes. Oliver and his new family light candles for Agnes and Nancy in a church. Oliver is last seen celebrating Christmas with his new family.

== Differences ==
The adaptation makes several major alterations to the plot of the source material, which include both alterations of events as well as familial relationships.

Rose Maylie is living with Mr Brownlow, and she addresses him as "uncle", but explains that he is in fact her guardian who took her and her sister, Agnes, in when her mother died. Her sister has been missing for many years, and the search for her has been ongoing. Mr Brownlow is now a part of the overall family tree, since Edward Monks is made his grandchild. As in the book, Monks becomes aware that Oliver is his half-brother, born to the missing Agnes who had a relationship with his father, and seeks to end his life so that there is no competition to his inheritance. As a result, Oliver is ultimately revealed to be Mr Brownlow's grandchild, in addition to being Rose's nephew and Monks' half-brother, as in the novel. Unlike the book, however, Monks is not an unattractive, nervous and cowardly epileptic, but a scheming, manipulative and attractive cad seeking engagement to Rose, who clearly doesn't like him.

Nancy is even more of a mother figure to Oliver than in the original novel, the famous musical version or especially, the 1948 David Lean film version, in which she does not even express any concern at all for him until after she and Sikes bring him back to Fagin's. In the 2007 version, she is seen constantly looking after him and tending to his needs (she even kisses him tenderly at one point, stopping just short of telling the boy that she loves him).

When a gun was pointed at Sikes when he attempts to rob the house, he uses Oliver as a shield from the shots, injuring him. Oliver is taken back to Fagin's lair to recover, rather than being nursed back to health in the countryside by the Maylie family, as in the novel. It is Nancy's informing Rose, and a highly skeptical Mr Brownlow, of Oliver's whereabouts that results in her demise at the hands of Sikes. Her ghost continues to haunt him when he returns to London with Oliver, resulting in him choosing to hang himself in the sewers as a means of escaping the London crowds who chase him.

Meanwhile, Monks' murderous motive is discovered by Mr Brownlow and Rose; he is disowned and sent to the West Indies, and Oliver, escaping the clutches of the crazed Sikes, returns to the Brownlow household, and is welcomed. It is the Artful Dodger, rather than Oliver, who visits the condemned Fagin in prison, and goes to his public execution. Sikes's dog finds Dodger and the two disappear into the crowds together. Fagin has genuine concern for Oliver in this version.

== Cast ==
- William Miller as Oliver Twist, on orphan with a deep desire to find out who his mother was
- Timothy Spall as Fagin, a Jewish fence who looks after and mentors a gang of boy thieves
- Edward Fox as Mr Brownlow, a taciturn but kindly old gentleman who takes Oliver in
- Adam Arnold as The Artful Dodger, Fagin's most adept pickpocket
- Julian Rhind-Tutt as Monks, a.k.a. Edward Brownlow, Mr Brownlow's grandson
- Tom Hardy as Bill Sikes, a brutish career criminal.
- Sophie Okonedo as Nancy, Bill's lover and a fellow criminal
- Morven Christie as Rose Maylie
- Gregor Fisher as Mr Bumble, the parish beadle at Mudfog Workhouse
- Sarah Lancashire as Mrs Corney, the matron of Mudfog Workhouse
- Anna Massey as Mrs Bedwin, Mr Brownlow's housekeeper
- Nicola Walker as Sally, a trustee of Mudfog Workhouse who was midwife at Oliver's birth
- Rob Brydon as Mr Fang, a cruel magistrate
- John Sessions as Mr Sowerberry, an undertaker
- Michelle Gomez as Mrs Sowerberry, Mr Sowberberry's shrewish and hat-obsessed wife
- Adam Gillen as Noah Claypole, an apprentice of Mr Sowerberry who bullies Oliver to assert his self-perceived superiority
- Ruby Bentall as Charlotte, the Sowerberrys' maidservant
- Vincent Franklin as Mr Limbkins, the head of the board of well-fed, hypocritical, upper-class administrators of the workhouse
- Connor Catchpole as Pearly, a member of Fagin's gang of thieves and the Dodger's rival; named ironically on account of his bad teeth
- Edward Tudor-Pole as Mr Slipsby
- Callum Higgins as Spike, a member of Fagin's gang
- Reece Dos-Santos as Stick, a member of Fagin's gang
- Niall O'Mara as Handles, a member of Fagin's gang named for his big ears.
- Peter Kirkham as a boy at the Mudfog Workhouse who serves with Oliver, who is beaten for desperately eating the oakum he is tasked with weaving due to the children of the workhouse being underfed

== Episodes ==
No	Title	Length	Writer	Director	Airdate
1	"Episode 1"	60 minutes	Sarah Phelps	Coky Giedroyc	18 December 2007
2	"Episode 2"	30 minutes	Sarah Phelps	Coky Giedroyc	19 December 2007
3	"Episode 3"	30 minutes	Sarah Phelps	Coky Giedroyc	20 December 2007
4	"Episode 4"	30 minutes	Sarah Phelps	Coky Giedroyc	21 December 2007
5	"Episode 5"	30 minutes	Sarah Phelps	Coky Giedroyc	22 December 2007

== Ratings ==
Episode	Viewers (millions)
1	7.82
2	5.67
3	6.10
4	6.34
5	8.17
