= Oliver Twist (1962 serial) =

- Opening title
- Genre: Period drama
- Based on: Oliver Twist by Charles Dickens
- Screenplay by: Constance Cox
- Directed by: Eric Tayler (credited as 'producer')
- Starring: Bruce Prochnik; Max Adrian; Peter Vaughan
- Composer: Ron Grainer
- Country of origin: United Kingdom
- Original language: English
- No. of episodes: 13

Production
- Producer: Eric Tayler
- Running time: 30 minutes

Original release
- Network: BBC TV
- Release: 7 January – 1 April 1962

Oliver Twist is a 1962 BBC TV adaptation of Charles Dickens' 1838 novel Oliver Twist, serialised in 13 episodes. Due in part to its transmission at Sunday teatimes, the production proved to be controversial, with questions asked in Parliament and many viewer complaints over the brutal murder of Nancy by Bill Sikes in its eleventh episode. The serial has survived intact, and was released to DVD in 2017 by Simply Media.

== Plot ==
For a detailed plot, see Oliver Twist.

== Cast ==
Bruce Prochnik as Oliver had previously appeared in the part in the West End run of the musical version of the story, Oliver!, in 1961. Both Prochnik as Oliver and Willoughby Goddard, who played Mr Bumble, would subsequently go on to take the same roles in the original Broadway version of Oliver! in 1963.

- Bruce Prochnik as Oliver Twist (13 episodes)
- Max Adrian as Fagin (11 episodes)
- Peter Vaughan as Bill Sikes (10 episodes)
- Carmel McSharry as Nancy (10 episodes)
- John Carson as Monks (9 episodes)
- George Curzon as Mr Brownlow (8 episodes)
- Willoughby Goddard as Mr Bumble (8 episodes)
- Alan Rothwell as Charley Bates (8 episodes)
- Gay Cameron as Rose Maylie (7 episodes)
- Lloyd Pearson as Dr Losberne (6 episodes)
- Peter Furnell as Tom Chitling (6 episodes)
- Melvyn Hayes as The Artful Dodger (5 episodes)
- Peggy Thorpe-Bates as Mrs Bumble (5 episodes)
- William Mervyn as Mr Grimwig (5 episodes)
- Noel Hood as Mrs Maylie (4 episodes)
- John Breslin as Harry Maylie (4 episodes)
- Barry Wilsher as Noah Claypole (4 episodes)
- Madeleine Christie as Mrs Bedwin (4 episodes)
- Richard Caldicot as Giles (4 episodes)
- Peter Stephens as Mr Limbkins (3 episodes)
- Priscilla Morgan as Charlotte (3 episodes)
- Donald Eccles as Mr Sowerberry (3 episodes)
- Harry Landis as Toby Crackit (3 episodes)
- Aimée Delamain as Old Sally (2 episodes)
- Aubrey Morris as Brittles (2 episodes)
- Fred Ferris as Man (2 episodes)
- Kenneth Adams as Man (2 episodes)
- Peter Bennett as Barney (2 episodes)
- Eric Dodson as Gentleman (2 episodes)
- Jane Merrow as Oliver's Mother (1 episode)
- Alec Foster as Carter (1 episode)
- Barbara Hicks as Mrs Sowerberry (1 episode)
- Robert Mooney as Surgeon (1 episode)
- Patricia Pacy as Mary (1 episode)
- Mary Quinn as Mrs Mann (1 episode)
- Raymond Adamson as Police Officer (1 episode)
- Jean Theobald as Susan (1 episode)
- Meadows White as Bookseller (1 episode)
- Péter Delmár as Ned (1 episode)
- Janet Barrow as Old Woman (1 episode)
- Howard Douglas as Landlord (1 episode)
- Victor Platt as Blathers (1 episode)
- Rosemary Rogers as Martha (1 episode)
- Philip Anthony as Duff (1 episode)
- John Barrett as Old Man (1 episode)
- David King as Gentleman of the Workhouse Board (1 episode)
- Margot Thomas as Woman (1 episode)
- Reginald Green as Gentleman of the Workhouse Board (1 episode)
- Winifred Hill as Woman (1 episode)
- Henry McCarthy as Master of Workhouse (1 episode)
- Margaret Wolfit as Bet (1 episode)
- Ray Alderson as Boy (1 episode)
- Lane Meddick as Pedlar (1 episode)
- Edwin Brown as Man (1 episode)
- Maurice Durant as Warder (1 episode)
- Barbara Leake as Cook (1 episode)
- Ursula Hirst as Housemaid (1 episode)
- Richard Mayes as Man (1 episode)
- Gareth Tandy as Boy (1 episode)
- Robert S. Young as Clerk of Court (1 episode)
- Roy Adams as Man (1 episode)
- Robert Howell as Dick (1 episode)
- Ronald Mayer as Foreman of Jury (1 episode)
- Arthur Ridley as Judge (1 episode)
- Frank Sieman as Guard (1 episode)
- Stan Simmons as Butcher's Boy (1 episode)
- Edward Wade as Ostler (1 episode)
- Charles Rea as Gamekeeper (1 episode)
- Ronald Ibbs as Gentleman (1 episode)
- Denis Cleary as Detective (1 episode)

== Archive status ==
All episodes survived the BBC's junking intact. Although the original 405-line master videotapes were wiped or destroyed, copies survived in the form of telerecordings created for preservation and/or rebroadcast. The films received restoration by Peter Crocker at SVS (known for classic Doctor Who restoration for DVD releases), although some faults such as high pitched ringing over the audio and a lack of VidFIRE due to the low quality of the reels are evident on the release, which is displayed as a warning on the DVD.

== Critical reception ==
Of its DVD release, Archive Television Musings wrote "Whilst there’s numerous adaptations of Olivier Twist to choose from, this one – thanks to the fidelity it displays to Dickens' original novel and the performances (especially Peter Vaughan's rampaging Bill Sikes) – is certainly worth checking out. Recommended."
