= Oliver Twist (1997 film) =

1997 television movie produced by Walt Disney Television

- DVD cover
- Based on: Oliver Twist by Charles Dickens
- Teleplay by: Monte Merrick
- Directed by: Tony Bill
- Starring: Richard Dreyfuss; Elijah Wood; David O'Hara; Alex Trench
- Theme music composer: Van Dyke Parks
- Country of origin: United States
- Original language: English

Production
- Producer: John Baldecchi
- Cinematography: Bing Sokolsky
- Editor: Axel Hubert
- Running time: 91 min.
- Production company: Walt Disney Television
- Budget: $6 million

Original release
- Network: ABC
- Release: November 16, 1997

Oliver Twist is a 1997 American made-for-television film based on Charles Dickens's 1838 novel of the same title. The film was directed by Tony Bill, written by Monte Merrick and produced by Walt Disney Television. It stars Richard Dreyfuss, Elijah Wood, David O'Hara, and Alex Trench as the titular character.

As in most film adaptations of this novel, Monks, Oliver's half-brother, is not in the film. There are other changes as well. The bookseller does not testify for Oliver at his trial, but Rose Maylie does. Most of the changes are minor, but a major one is that when Oliver is taken in by Fagin's gang he himself, and not the Widow Corney, is in possession of his mother's locket, and Oliver has come to London, not just to seek his fortune, but to discover his true identity. Mr. Bumble, Corney's assistant, is only in one scene, and the Widow Corney's role is expanded. As in the musical and the 1968 film Oliver!, Nancy is murdered at London Bridge, not in her bedroom as in the novel. Fagin is not sentenced to death but escapes.

Oliver Twist premiered on ABC as part of The Wonderful World of Disney on November 16, 1997.

== Plot ==
A boy is born in an orphanage owned by the Widow Corney. The mother dies in childbirth, leaving her son a locket containing her portrait. Corney takes the locket and assistant, Mr. Bumble, assigns the child the name Oliver Twist from a rotating list. At age six, Oliver, working in the orphanage, asks to see his locket. Corney says he can have it when he's twelve. On the eve of his twelfth birthday, Oliver draws straws at dinner for the task of asking Corney for more food. He draws the short straw and she throws him out without his locket. He steals it back that night and departs for London.

A young man named Jack Dawkins, also known as the Artful Dodger, stops the hungry Oliver from stealing an apple. Dodger, proud to be a professional thief, takes Oliver into the band of boys he lives with. His boss, Fagin, an old and sly man who teaches the group how to steal, takes Oliver's locket as he's welcomed to the group. Fagin owes money to Bill Sikes, a thief and murderer, and his kind girlfriend, Nancy. Oliver asks Fagin about the treasure he keeps hidden in a box and protects by threat of death. Fagin admits Oliver's locket is there.

Dodger teaches Oliver to be a professional thief, but Oliver is caught red-handed the first time he attempts to pick a pocket. Rose, the niece of the intended victim Mister Brownlow, testifies that Oliver was not the thief. Oliver refuses to identify Dodger, who had taken Brownlow's watch after Oliver was caught. Rose takes Oliver as a guest at their mansion in Grosvenor Square where a portrait of Mister Brownlow's late wife corresponds to the image is displayed in Oliver's locket. Oliver learns Brownlow and his wife had a daughter who always carried a gold locket with that portrait and that he may be Brownlow's grandson, Rose's cousin.

When Dodger locates Oliver, Sikes convinces Fagin he knows too much about the group and is permitted to kidnap him. Nancy helps unwillingly, and Dodger refuses to put Oliver in the bag during the abduction. At Fagin's hideout, Oliver confirms he said nothing about the group, and tells Nancy he loved the Brownlows. Sikes prevents Nancy from returning Oliver to the mansion and hires Dodger to follow her. Sikes tricks Oliver into revealing the location of Fagin's treasure, then forces Oliver to the Brownlow's at gunpoint to rob them. Oliver purposely drops a bag of silver to wake Rose, but Mister Brownlow spots Oliver as he escapes with Sikes.

Dodger follows Nancy to the Brownlows the next day, where he overhears her inform them of Oliver's abduction, and their agreement to accept Oliver's return to them at London Bridge at midnight. Dodger returns to Sikes who threatens him into revealing what he overheard. Wanting Oliver to be free, Dodger takes him to the bridge himself to throw Sikes off the trail. Nancy, unaware of Dodger's plan, is murdered by Sikes. Oliver returns to the hideout to retrieve his locket and Sikes interrupts and tries to flee with the treasure. Fagin arrives, followed by Dodger, and when a police dog follows Sikes trail from Nancy's dead body, the police arrive. Sikes locks the hideout door, takes Oliver hostage and hauls the treasure to the roof. Oliver grabs the box from Sikes, who slips, tangles in a coil of rope, and is hung by neck. Dodger is arrested while Fagin unsuccessfully negotiates with Oliver for the locket. Oliver finally has proof he is Mister Brownlow’s grandsons. Oliver promises Dodger they will meet again someday, and moves into his new home.

== Cast ==
- Richard Dreyfuss as Fagin
- Elijah Wood as The Artful Dodger
- David O'Hara as Bill Sikes
- Alex Trench as Oliver Twist
- Antoine Byrne as Nancy
- Olivia Caffrey as Rose Maylie
- Anthony Finigan as Mr. Brownlow
- Maria Charles as Widow Corney
- Des Braiden as Orphanage Magistrate
- Eileen Colgan as Mrs. Bedwin, Mr Brownlow's maid
- Eilish Moore as Cook
- Lisa Dwan as Agnes, Oliver's mother
- Conor Evans as Chief Constable
- A.J. Kennedy as Police Constable

== Production ==
Initially the film was intended to be a theatrical release with a $12 million budget, but after the producers considered the recent unforgiving market conditions for family films at the box office they instead opted to reposition it as a television film for The Wonderful World of Disney with a $6 million budget. While the budget for television films would ordinarily fall more in the range of $3 million, executive producer Laurence Mark said they were able to secure a larger budget due to Disney's desire to rebuild the allure of The Wonderful World of Disney.

For the role of Fagin, the producers had originally sought Mick Jagger but he ultimately passed on the role. In December 1996, it was reported that Richard Dreyfuss had been cast as Fagin.
