= Monks (Oliver Twist) =

Character in Charles Dickens' novel Oliver Twist

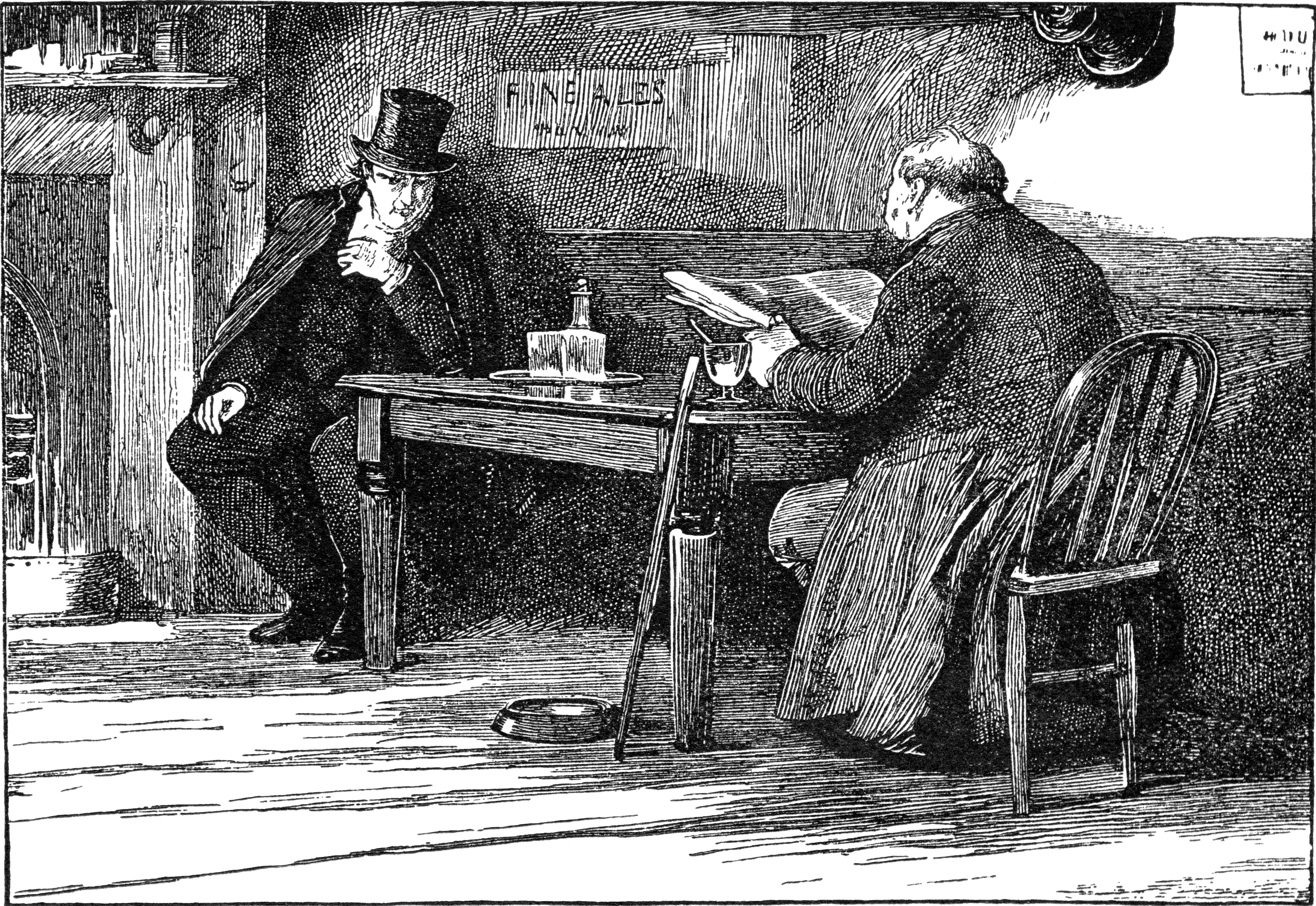
- Monks (left) depicted by James Mahoney
- Portrayed by: Carl Stockdale (1922 film); Ralph Truman (1948 film); John Carson (1962 TV serial); Oliver Cotton (1982 TV film); Pip Donaghy (1985 TV serial); Marc Warren (1999 miniseries); Julian Rhind-Tutt (2007 miniseries); Ezekiel Simat (2023 TV series)

In-universe information
- Full name: Edward Leeford
- Gender: Male
- Occupation: Criminal
- Family: Edwin Leeford (father, deceased); Mrs Leeford (mother, deceased); Oliver Twist (half-brother)
- Nationality: English

Edward "Monks" Leeford is a fictional character and one of the main antagonists (alongside Bill Sikes) in the 1838 novel Oliver Twist by Charles Dickens. He is actually the criminally-inclined half-brother of Oliver Twist, but he hides his identity. Monks' parents separated when he was a child, and his father had a relationship with a young woman, Agnes Fleming. This resulted in Agnes' pregnancy. She died in childbirth after giving birth to the baby that would be named Oliver Twist.

== Character history ==
=== Background ===
Monks was born from a loveless marriage and goaded by his own mother to hatred of Oliver, who, unknown to himself, is actually Monks's half-brother. Oliver has no idea of Monks's existence, but Monks knows of Oliver's existence; Monks also knows of the existence of a will left by his father (who despised him) which favours Oliver and not Monks; however, if Oliver ever should commit a criminal act (before turning twelve) he will be automatically disinherited, whereupon the money would go to Monks. Monks accidentally sees Oliver on the streets of London one day and tracks him to the elderly criminal Fagin's den, setting out to ruin him.

=== Oliver Twist ===
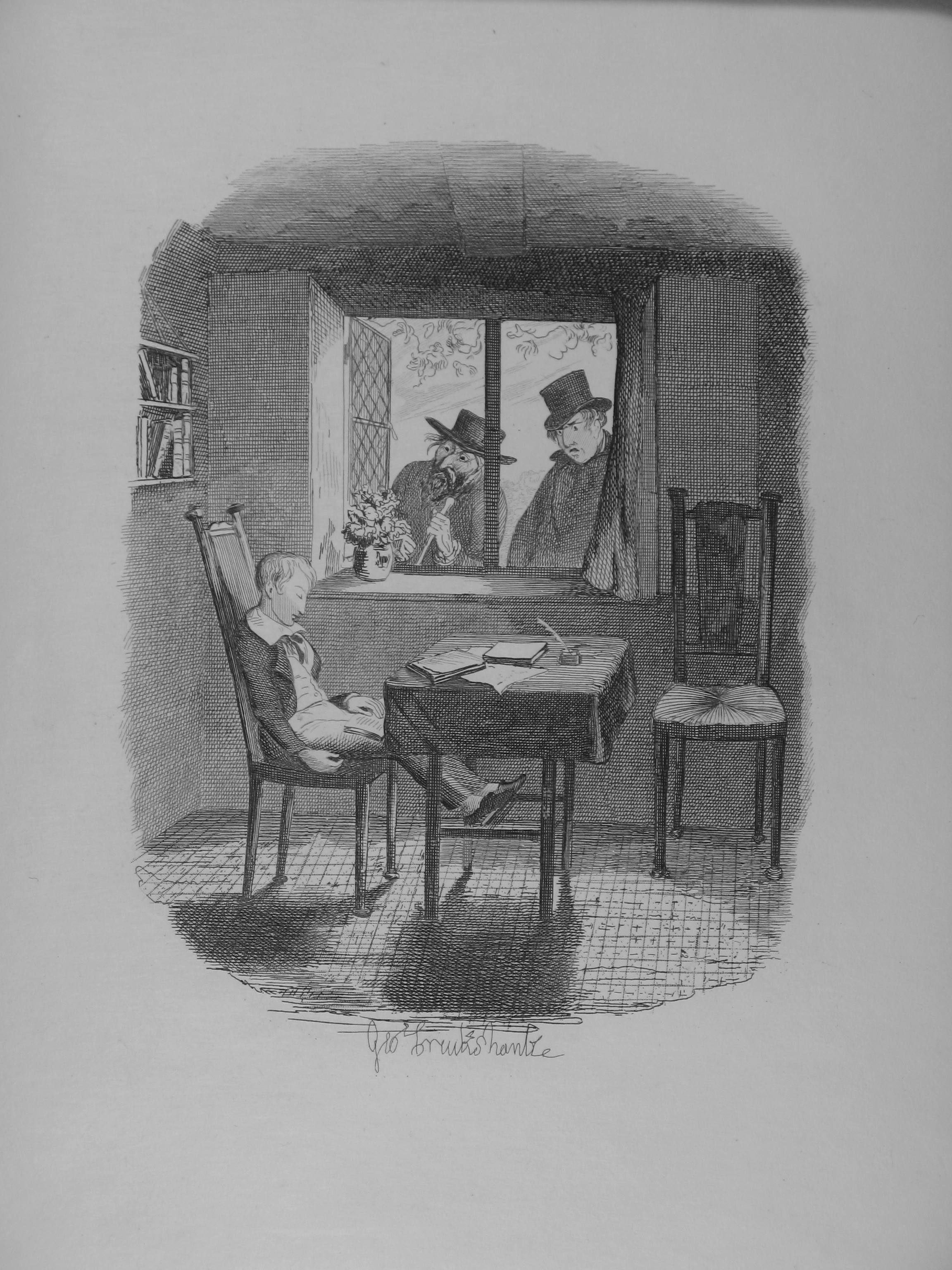
Monks and Fagin spy on Oliver

Monks pays Fagin to make Oliver into a criminal, and this is the real reason that Fagin wishes to keep him in his clutches. No one knows of the bargain that Fagin has made with Monks, until Nancy, one of the members of the gang, who harbors a motherly affection for Oliver, overhears a conversation between the two criminals. By this time, Oliver has unwillingly accompanied Fagin's vicious henchman, Bill Sikes, on a house break-in, and has been shot by Mr. Giles, one of the servants. Monks and Fagin plot to get him back, and Nancy informs on Monks to Rose Maylie, a young woman who lives in the house that Sikes attempted to rob, and who found the wounded Oliver, became convinced of his innocence, and nursed him back to health. In addition, Monks meets with Mr Bumble, the local beadle of the parish workhouse in which Oliver was born, and the Widow Corney, now Bumble's unhappily married wife. From them he buys a locket and a ring that belonged to Oliver's mother, the only proof of his half-brother's true identity, throwing the evidence into the river.

Fagin, suspicious of Nancy, sends out a spy after her. She goes to London Bridge to keep an arranged appointment with Rose and Mr Brownlow, Oliver's benefactor. Nancy reveals all she knows about Monks to them, and Brownlow, a close friend of Oliver's late father, realizes Monks's true identity, but does not reveal it to Nancy or Rose. After returning home, Nancy is viciously murdered by Sikes (her lover) when he returns from a burglary and is tricked by Fagin into believing that she also informed on him. Her murder not only brings down Fagin's gang, but enables Brownlow and the police to get their hands on Monks. Brownlow agrees not to send him to prison, on the condition that he make financial restitution and reveal all to Oliver and Rose Maylie. At a family meeting arranged by Brownlow, Monks does so. He emigrates to America, but soon squanders his money, becomes involved in crime again and is imprisoned. He dies in prison.

== Characteristics ==
Monks is one of Dickens's more melodramatic characters - totally evil without even the shred of affection that Bill Sikes has for his Bull Terrier, Bullseye. He is physically unattractive, has a dark red mark on the left side of his jaw, is subject to severe epileptic fits, and completely cowardly, not willing to outwardly be associated with any form of crime (this is not because he is a moral being, but because he fears being caught).

== In other media ==
Monks does not appear at all in Oliver!, the musical adaptation of the novel, nor in several film versions of the novel which seek to simplify the story, including Roman Polanski's 2005 adaptation of Oliver Twist. He does, however, appear in several mini-series versions of the novel, as well as in David Lean's 1948 film version.

Carl Stockdale played Monks twice in the 1916 film version and the 1922 film version. In the ending of the latter, Monks is forgiven by Oliver who persuades Mr. Brownlow not to turn him over to the police.

Ralph Truman portrays Monks in the 1948 film version. At the end of the film, Monks' involvement with Fagin is discovered and he is arrested.

John Carson portrays Monks in the 1962 BBC serial. This depiction of the character is considered to be very faithful to the source material.

In the 1980 British television series The Further Adventures of Oliver Twist, Monks is played by Geoffrey Larder. In this series, Monks does not leave for America, as stated in Dickens' novel, but continues his vendetta against Oliver and at the end of the series apparently commits suicide by leaping into the Thames while being pursued by police (although there is a possibility that he may have swum to safety and escaped).

Oliver Cotton played Monks in the U.S. 1982 Hallmark TV version of the film, where he actually has an encounter with Oliver and his red mark was on the top of his right eyebrow instead (not to be confused with the Australian film version, which was released the same year). At the end of the film, Monks is arrested.

Pip Donaghy played Monks in the 1985 BBC TV serial, where he also had an encounter with Oliver, constantly suffered severe epileptic fits every time his half-brother's name was mentioned, and his red mark was on his neck instead.

In the 2023 series The Artful Dodger (2023 TV series), Monks is portrayed by Australian actor, Ezekiel Simat. In this iteration, there is no reference to Monks' epilepsy. He is a seemingly omnipresent threat to Fagin and Dodger but does not cross paths with Oliver Twist at all.

The character of Monks (aka Edward Leeford) was particularly elaborated upon in a 1999 mini-series starring Robert Lindsay as Fagin. Monks (played by Marc Warren) is shown as a pathetic, snivelling character, Manipulated by his ambitious mother Mrs. Leeford (Lindsay Duncan). At one stage he complains "If I could live my life again, I wouldn't." Eventually his mother dies of a heart attack and, with some money granted by Oliver's guardians, he moves to the Caribbean where he finds happiness with a local woman with whom he starts a family (this does not happen in the Dickens novel). In one musical adaption using female actors, the Monks character, young "Emma Leeford," wants to give "Olivia Twist" a bad name so she may inherit her father's money. At the end of the movie, Monks tells Brownlow and Oliver about the horrible childhood he has had and promises to change his ways, Brownlow frees him and allows him to go down South. Years later, Monks is married and expecting a baby.

Edward "Monks" Brownlow appears as a much different character in the 2007 British TV serial played by Julian Rhind-Tutt. He is portrayed as a suave, manipulative mastermind, darkly witty and attractive to women. He is Mr. Brownlow's grandson, heir, and master of the household. Arrogant and greedy, he is somewhat more daring than in the book and most of its adaptations and is shown to be a gifted liar and smooth-talker. Edward goes under the alias "Monks" and hires Fagin to kill Oliver but when Fagin doesn't, he gives Fagin two more days or Monks himself will kill Oliver. Nancy eavesdrops on this, and the next day informs Mr. Brownlow and Rose. Rose believes her, but Mr. Brownlow doesn't until Fagin also tells him that Monks wanted Oliver dead. When Monks returns to his mansion from Mudfog Workhouse with Oliver's birth details, Mr. Brownlow angrily disowns and disinherits Monks, and sends him to the West Indies, and Oliver becomes the new heir.

== Reception ==
Monks has been criticized as portraying all epileptics as evil.
