= Oliver Twist (1999 TV series) =

1999 television series produced by ITV

- DVD cover
- Based on: Oliver Twist by Charles Dickens
- Written by: Alan Bleasdale
- Directed by: Renny Rye
- Starring: Robert Lindsay; Keira Knightley; Michael Kitchen; Sam Smith; Julie Walters
- Theme music composer: Paul Pritchard
- Country of origin: United Kingdom
- Original language: English
- No. of series: 1
- No. of episodes: 4

Production
- Producer: Keith Thompson
- Cinematography: Walter McGill
- Running time: 386 minutes
- Production companies: Diplomat Films; United Productions; for HTV and WGBH (Boston)

Original release
- Network: ITV
- Release: 28 November – 19 December 1999

Oliver Twist is a 1999 four-part drama serial produced by ITV based on the 1838 novel Oliver Twist by Charles Dickens.

== Plot ==
Edwin Leeford, who has a country estate, falls in love with his neighbour, Agnes Fleming, who lives with her widowed former sea-captain father and her young sister, Rose. After Agnes becomes pregnant by Edwin, she discovers he is married, with a long-estranged wife and a teenage son. Edwin is called to Rome by a dying uncle who plans to leave him a fortune as compensation for having arranged Edwin's unhappy marriage. However, his wife Elizabeth learns of this plan, follows him there, and murders him (after the uncle dies and Edwin inherits his wealth). She tries to convince their son Edward to murder Agnes but his inability to do so triggers a seizure and Agnes runs away, convinced Edwin abandoned her despite his promise to return: Rose witnesses the attack and escapes and is traumatized. Agnes seems to contemplate suicide but trudges on to a town, where she collapses, is taken to the local workhouse and dies in childbirth. Her baby is christened Oliver Twist and taken to a farm for foundlings.

At nine, Oliver is moved from the farm back to the workhouse, where he is starved, beaten, and forced to work long hours alongside other children. Other boys compel him at mealtime to ask for more food, and the workhouse board decides he has to be sent away. He is apprenticed to Mr Sowerberry, an undertaker, who is partly sympathetic to him, though his wife and their servants abuse Oliver, and Sowerberry's other apprentice, Noah, insinuates that Oliver's mother is a criminal, inciting Oliver to violence. Oliver escapes from the house and runs away to London, where he is taken by a young pickpocket, the Artful Dodger, to a dwelling occupied by young aspiring thieves under the tutelage of Fagin, a former magician from Prague reduced to a life of crime.

By this point, Edward Leeford, Oliver's half-brother, lives in London with his mother, who is determined to disinherit Oliver. Using the pseudonym Monks, Edward associates with Fagin and contracts him to make Oliver a criminal and experience public disgrace, as a provision in their father's will left most of his estate to Agnes's child, but disinherited him if the child was a boy who showed any signs of bad character. Oliver accompanies the Dodger and Charley, another young thief, outdoors and they set him up to be arrested for pickpocketing. The target is Mr Brownlow, Edwin Leeford's dearest friend and executor of his will, with whom Edwin left a portrait of Agnes on his way to Rome. A bookstore owner's testimony exonerates Oliver.

Unaware of who his charge is, Mr Brownlow takes Oliver home to live with him and his housekeeper Mrs Bedwin. Before Oliver can tell his story, he is kidnapped while on an errand for Brownlow by two of Fagin's adult accomplices, Bill Sikes (a housebreaker) and Nancy (Sikes's lover and a prostitute), and returned to Fagin's house. Brownlow reluctantly accepts his friend Grimwig's insistence that Oliver has lied and has returned to the thieves and angrily sends Mrs Bedwin, who defends Oliver, to his country house. Fagin, still determined to fulfill his contract with Monks and discredit Oliver, sends him off with Bill Sikes and another housebreaker, Toby Crackit, to rob this country house, where Mrs Bedwin is looking after Agnes's orphaned sister Rose, adopted by Brownlow, now 17, and just returned from a trip to Paris with her governess. Four other servants help with the house.

During the robbery, Oliver is shot in the dark by one of the servants. Toby runs, Sikes leaves Oliver in a ditch, then runs off himself; Oliver makes his way to the house and is taken in by Mrs Bedwin. When Brownlow arrives, finally what Oliver knows of his history is revealed, and Rose befriends him. However, Fagin and Monks travel to this place after neither Sikes nor Toby can confirm that Oliver is dead; Rose and Oliver see them peering in a window and Rose, recognizing Monks from his attack on her sister, has this old trauma reawakened. However, both men escape from the estate. Monks had previously managed to get from Mr Bumble, formerly beadle in the town where Oliver was born, and his wife, the workhouse matron, a locket and ring Edwin gave to Agnes, engraved with their names, and has kept these proofs of Oliver's identity.

Brownlow and his household return to London to find out more about Oliver's history. Nancy, who has always been sympathetic to Oliver, runs to Brownlow's house while Sikes is asleep and tells them about the contract between Monks and Fagin. Finally, Rose can describe her nightmares about Agnes's attacker. Meanwhile, Fagin has grown suspicious of Nancy and has sent the Dodger and Charley to spy on her; when Sikes learns she went to Brownlow's house, he murders her in a fit of rage. Meanwhile, Elizabeth Leeford, who has persisted in her pursuit of revenge and money, but now is aging and unwell, dies suddenly, leaving Monks/Edward, who is now strong enough to escape her beatings, a free agent. Brownlow's men arrest him and bring him to Brownlow's house.

Between Nancy's murder and Monks's desertion, Fagin is increasingly cornered. He scatters his gang and disguises himself, but Sikes, now a fugitive, arrives to try to get Fagin to help him escape. By this point, a mob is breaking down the doors of the house. Sikes falls from the roof and is killed; Fagin is spotted by Oliver and Charley (who has given up on crime) in the crowd and arrested.

Brownlow persuades Edward Leeford to confess to Rose and Oliver what he and his mother tried to do. He describes his own childhood trauma, including an accident that left him with uncontrollable seizures and his mother's abuse of him. Brownlow, Rose, and Oliver agree that he can have his rightful part of his father's estate, and he emigrates to the Caribbean, where he marries and starts a family.

As Fagin awaits execution, Brownlow and Oliver visit him, and he tells Oliver how to find what Monks/Edward gave him for safekeeping, an unmailed letter from Edwin to Agnes, written shortly after the death of his uncle and just before his own murder; Brownlow reads this to Oliver. Shortly thereafter, Rose marries Dr Losborne, a local physician, and Oliver attends the wedding with Brownlow's household, where Charley is now employed.

== Cast ==
- Sam Smith as Oliver Twist
- Robert Lindsay as Fagin
- Julie Walters as Mrs Mann (Widow Corney)
- Michael Kitchen as Mr Brownlow
- Alun Armstrong as Captain Fleming
- Lindsay Duncan as Elizabeth Leeford
- David Ross as Mr Bumble
- Andy Serkis as Bill Sykes
- David Bark-Jones as Doctor Losberne
- Tim Dutton as Edwin Leeford
- Marc Warren as Monks (Edward Leeford)
- Annette Crosbie as Mrs Bedwin
- Emily Woof as Nancy
- Isla Fisher as Bet
- Roger Lloyd-Pack as Mr Sowerberry
- Sophia Myles as Agnes Fleming
- Keira Knightley as Rose Maylie (Fleming)
- Alex Crowley as The Artful Dodger
- Roland Manookian as Charley Bates

== Controversy ==
The adaptation, by Alan Bleasdale, attracted controversy, particularly for the decision to begin with two hours of backstory (much of it invented by Bleasdale) before reaching the plot of the novel. Furthermore, Bleasdale altered well-known sections of the novel, so that although the basic idea is the same, almost every detail is changed enough so that the drama plays like an original story, not an adaptation. For example, Monks is changed from a completely irredeemable and evil villain to someone who reforms to the point of getting married and starting a family.

== Home media ==
On 27 March 2000 ITV released a double box set VHS of the adaption. It was co-owned by the TV and film company Carlton. On 16 October 2006 ITV re-released it on DVD.
