= Oliver Twist (1982 TV film) =

1982 television film directed by Clive Donner

- Hungarian DVD cover
- Genre: Crime; Drama
- Based on: Oliver Twist by Charles Dickens
- Written by: James Goldman
- Directed by: Clive Donner
- Starring: George C. Scott; Tim Curry; Michael Hordern; Timothy West; Eileen Atkins; Cherie Lunghi; Oliver Cotton; Richard Charles; Martin Tempest
- Music by: Nick Bicât
- Countries of origin: United States; United Kingdom
- Original language: English

Production
- Executive producer: William F. Storke
- Producers: Ted Childs; Norton Romsey
- Cinematography: Norman G. Langley
- Editor: Peter Tanner
- Running time: 103 minutes
- Production companies: Claridge Productions; Grafton Productions; Norman Rosemont Productions; Trident

Original release
- Network: CBS
- Release: March 23, 1982

Oliver Twist is a 1982 American-British made-for-television film adaptation of the 1838 Charles Dickens classic of the same name, premiering on the CBS television network as part of the Hallmark Hall of Fame anthology. Stars include George C. Scott, Tim Curry, Cherie Lunghi and Richard Charles as Oliver Twist, in his first major film role.

== Plot ==
Alice Fleming, a pregnant woman, makes her way to a workhouse and dies giving birth to a baby boy. The beadle of the workhouse, Mr. Bumble names the boy Oliver Twist. Years later, Oliver makes the mistake of asking for more gruel for a fellow starving orphan after he refuses to accept his. As punishment, Oliver is sold to work as an apprentice to a local undertaker named Mr. Sowerberry, where he is used as a mute at children's funerals. This leads to resentment from Sowerberry's older apprentice, Noah Claypole, who retaliates by insulting Agnes, resulting in Oliver attacking Noah. Siding with Noah, Sowerberry decides to send Oliver back to the workhouse.

However, Oliver escapes and travels a seven-day journey to London where he meets a pickpocket named Jack Dawkins, better known as the Artful Dodger. Dodger introduces Oliver to his master, a criminal named Fagin. Soon enough, Oliver learns that Fagin teaches young boys how to steal. Oliver also meets Bill Sikes, Fagin's brutal associate and his lover, Nancy, who develops a maternal love for Oliver. Sikes forces Oliver to burgle a house. The burglary goes wrong when Oliver is shot and Sikes escapes leaving Oliver behind. The residents of the house, Mr. Brownlow and his niece Rose Maylie decide to nurse Oliver back to health. They notice a strong resemblance between Oliver and a portrait of Agnes, Mr. Brownlow's friend's daughter.

Meanwhile, it is revealed that Fagin is working with a mysterious man named Monks, who is none other than Oliver's half-brother. Monks' father Edwin Leeford had left a will which favours Oliver over Monks; however, the will states that should Oliver be involved in crime, then Monks will be entitled to the will. Monks visits Mr. and Mrs Bumble, buying from them a locket which Mrs. Bumble had stolen from Agnes before she died. Returning to London, Monks offers Fagin £500 to murder Oliver. Nancy overhears this and informs both Mr. Brownlow and Rose. Unbeknown to her, Fagin has sent one of his boys, Charlie Bates, to dodge Nancy (with Dodger having been deported to Australia). Charlie reveals what he heard to Fagin, who confronts Nancy the following day. Believing she has betrayed him, Sikes brutally murders Nancy whilst Fagin is arrested by the police. Monks is directly confronted by Mr. Brownlow, who is revealed to have been a close friend of Edwin, who fell in love with Agnes and subsequently gave birth to Oliver. Oliver recognises Monks from two previous encounters.

Whilst on the run, Sikes continues to be haunted by Nancy which leads him to accidentally hang himself whilst escaping from an angry mob on a rooftop. Mr. Brownlow and Oliver visit Fagin in jail, knowing the criminal will soon be sentenced to death; Fagin reveals he has left treasure for Oliver in his hideout. Mr. Brownlow, Oliver and Rose also travel to the workhouse where Mr. and Mrs. Bumble are forced to reveal their role in Monks' scheme. The two lose their jobs at the workhouse and Monks is sent to prison. Oliver leaves to continue his life with Mr. Brownlow.

== Cast ==
- Richard Charles as Oliver Twist
- George C. Scott as Fagin
- Tim Curry as Bill Sikes
- Michael Hordern as Mr. Brownlow
- Timothy West as Mr. Bumble
- Eileen Atkins as Mrs. Mann
- Cherie Lunghi as Nancy
- Martin Tempest as Artful Dodger
- Lysette Anthony as Agnes Fleming
- Oliver Cotton as Monks
- Eleanor David as Rose Maylie
- Philip Locke as Mr. Sowerberry
- Ann Beach as Mrs. Sowerberry
- Philip Davis as Noah Claypole
- Artro Morris as Mr. Giles
- John Barrard as Dr. Losborne
- Brenda Cowling as Mrs. Bedwin
- Ann Tirard as Mrs. Corney
- John Savident as Mr. Fang
- Debbie Arnold as Charlotte
- Timothy Spall as 1st Constable
- Robert Russell as 2nd Constable
