= Willoughby Goddard =

British actor (1926–2008)

- with Paul Stassino in The Saint (1969)
- Born: 4 July 1926; Bicester, Oxfordshire, England
- Died: 11 April 2008 (aged 81); London, England
- Occupation: Actor

Willoughby Wittenham Rees Goddard (4 July 1926 – 11 April 2008) was an English actor whose trademark rotund figure was well known on television and in films for more than 40 years.

== Biography ==
Goddard was born in Bicester, Oxfordshire. He played Mr. Bumble in two versions of Charles Dickens's Oliver Twist – a 1962 television adaptation, and the original Broadway production of the musical Oliver!. He originated the role of Cardinal Wolsey in the West End production of Robert Bolt's A Man for All Seasons. He appeared in the television series The Adventures of William Tell (which lasted 39 episodes) in 1958 and 1959 as the villain Landburgher Gessler and as Sir Geoffrey in The Man in Room 17, which ran two series of 13 hour-long black-and-white episodes in 1965 and 1966. He was cast as Reeder's boss, Sir Jason Toovey, (head of the Department of Public Prosecutions) in The Mind of Mr. J.G. Reeder, a TV series of 16 hour-long episodes with first season 1969 and second season 1971 based on short stories by Edgar Wallace.

Goddard retired from acting in 1987 and died in 2008, aged 81.

Goddard was buried in Teddington Cemetery.

== Filmography ==
=== Film appearances ===
- Bait (1950) – John Hartley
- The Million Pound Note (1950) – Stockbroker (uncredited)
- The Green Man (1956) – Statesman
- A Touch of the Sun (1956) – Golightly
- Stranger in Town (1957) – Publican
- Heart of a Child (1958) – Scott
- In the Wake of a Stranger (1959) – Shafto
- Inn for Trouble (1960) – Sgt Saunders
- The Millionairess (1961) – President
- The Secret Partner (1961) – Hotel Kepper
- Double Bunk (1961) – Prospective Purchaser
- The Long Shadow (1961) – Schober
- Fate Takes a Hand (1961) – Rollenshaw
- The Golden Rabbit (1962) – Clitheroe
- Carry On Cruising (1962) – Large Man
- The Wrong Box (1966) – James White Wragg
- The Charge of the Light Brigade (1968) – Squire
- Laughter in the Dark (1969) – Colonel
- The Juggler of Notre Dame (1970) – Judge Broadbottom
- The Canterbury Tales (1971) – Placebo
- Gawain and the Green Knight (1973) – Knight
- Joseph Andrews (1977) – Fourposter Innkeeper
- Jabberwocky (1977) – Eggman (uncredited)
- Quincy's Quest (1979) – General
- Young Sherlock Holmes (1985) – School Reverend
- God's Outlaw (1986) – Cardinal Wolsey

=== TV appearances ===
- David Copperfield (1956) – Mr. Creakle
- The Buccaneers (1956) – Phineas Bunch – "Marooned"
- The Buccaneers (1956) – Lawyer Pym – "Blood Will Tell"
- Gay Cavalier (1957) – Bulstrode – "Dragon's Heart"
- The Adventures of William Tell (1958–1959) – Landburger Gessler – regular cast
- The Invisible Man (1961) – Crowther – "Bank Raid"
- Charlesworth (1959) – Calvarez1
- Danger Man (1961) – McFadden – "The Journey Ends Halfway"
- The Avengers (1961) – The Deacon – "The Frighteners"
- Oliver Twist (1962) – Mr. Bumble
- Ghost Squad (1963) – Slim Salmon – "The Missing People"
- Richard the Lionheart (1963) – Arnold – "The Lord of Kenak"
- Public Eye (1965) – Chambers – "A Harsh World for Zealots"
- The Man in Room 17 (1965–1966) – Sir Geoffrey – regular cast
- The Baron (1967) – Colbert – "The Edge of Fear"
- The Saint (1969) – (ex) King Boris – "The Ex-King of Diamonds"
- The Mind of Mr. J.G. Reeder (1969) – Sir Jason Toovey – regular cast
- The Main Chance (1969) – What About Justice?
- Orson Welles Great Mysteries (1973) – Sir Thomas "Captain Rogers"
- The Sweeney (1976) – Kitter – "Sweet Smell of Succession"
- Space: 1999 (1977) – The Taybor – "The Taybor"
- The Ghosts of Motley Hall (1978) – H.R. Fortescue – "Skeleton in the Cupboard: Part 2"
- The Famous Five (1978) – The Man – "Five go to Mystery Moor"
- My Son, My Son (1979) – Mr. Moscrop
- The Incredible Mr Tanner (1981) – Tom
- The Black Adder (1983) – The Archbishop – "The Queen of Spain's Beard"

(1983) The Crown Court- Forensic Pathologist

- John Silver's Return to Treasure Island (1986) – Sir Solomon Pridham – "The Map"
- Porterhouse Blue (1987) – Professor Siblington
