= Oliver Twist (2005 film) =

2005 drama film directed by Roman Polanski

- American theatrical release poster
- Directed by: Roman Polanski
- Screenplay by: Ronald Harwood
- Based on: Oliver Twist; 1837 novel by Charles Dickens
- Produced by: Roman Polanski; Robert Benmussa; Alain Sarde
- Starring: Barney Clark; Ben Kingsley; Jamie Foreman; Leanne Rowe; Edward Hardwicke; Mark Strong
- Cinematography: Paweł Edelman
- Edited by: Hervé de Luze
- Music by: Rachel Portman
- Production company: RP Productions
- Distributed by: SPI International (Czech Republic); Pathé Distribution (United Kingdom & Ireland and France); Summit Entertainment (International)
- Release dates: 11 September 2005 (TIFF); 7 October 2005 (United Kingdom); 19 October 2005 (France)
- Running time: 130 minutes
- Countries: United Kingdom; Czech Republic; France
- Language: English
- Budget: $60 million
- Box office: $42.6 million

Oliver Twist is a 2005 drama film directed by Roman Polanski. The screenplay by Ronald Harwood adapts Charles Dickens's 1838 novel of the same name. It is an international co-production of the United Kingdom, the Czech Republic and France.

The film premiered at the 2005 Toronto International Film Festival on 11 September 2005 before going into limited release in the United States on 23 September. It received generally positive reviews from critics, but was a commercial failure.

== Plot ==
Nine-year-old orphan Oliver Twist is taken to the workhouse by the beadle Mr Bumble. After daring to ask for more food, Oliver is sold as an apprentice to Mr Sowerberry, a local undertaker, but runs away when Sowerberry's other apprentice, Noah Claypole, gets Oliver in trouble.

Oliver travels a seven-day journey to London where he befriends a young boy named Jack Dawkins, better known as the Artful Dodger, who takes him to join a gang of pickpockets led by the villainous Fagin. He also becomes acquainted with Nancy, a former pupil of Fagin's who is in love with Fagin's associate, Bill Sikes. Dodger and his friend Charley Bates take Oliver out to teach him to pick pockets—it ends in disaster when Oliver is falsely arrested for stealing from Mr Brownlow. However, Brownlow decides to take Oliver in and care for him when he learns of the boy's innocence.

Fagin and Sikes become worried that Oliver will bring down the authorities onto them, so force Nancy to help bring Oliver back. To ensure Oliver becomes a criminal, Sikes brings him to rob Brownlow's house at gunpoint. Oliver is wounded in a shoot-out between Sikes and Brownlow. Sikes and Fagin later decide that Oliver knows too much and will likely inform on them. Sikes suggests that they kill him, to which Fagin reluctantly agrees. Nancy overhears this and manages to inform Brownlow of Fagin's plan, keeping Sikes' name out of it. However, unbeknownst to her, Dodger has been sent by Fagin to spy on her and tells Fagin and Sikes, the latter of whom murders her.

Nancy's murder becomes public and the police resolve to arrest both Sikes and Fagin, for murder and abduction respectively. Sikes' dog, Bullseye, leads the authorities to the gang's hide-out. Sikes uses Oliver as a hostage whilst attempting to escape, but accidentally hangs himself. Oliver is brought back to live with Mr Brownlow and goes to visit Fagin in jail. He is sad to see Fagin, who was kind to him, hallucinating, and even more devastated to hear that Fagin will be executed for his crimes. Oliver and Brownlow return home to continue their lives, whilst a crowd gathers to witness Fagin's hanging.

== Cast ==
- Barney Clark as Oliver Twist
- Ben Kingsley as Fagin
- Jamie Foreman as Bill Sikes
- Leanne Rowe as Nancy
- Edward Hardwicke as Mr Brownlow
- Harry Eden as The Artful Dodger (Jack Dawkins)
- Mark Strong as Toby Crackit
- Frances Cuka as Mrs Bedwin
- Lewis Chase as Charley Bates
- Michael Heath as Mr Sowerberry
- Gillian Hanna as Mrs Sowerberry
- Chris Overton as Noah Claypole
- Jeremy Swift as Mr Bumble
- Paul Brooke as Mr Grimwig
- Ian McNeice as Mr Limbkins
- Alun Armstrong as Magistrate Fang
- John Nettleton as 1st Magistrate
- Tony Noble as 2nd Magistrate
- Liz Smith as Old Woman
- Patrick Godfrey as Bookseller
- Andrea Miltner as Other Woman in Twist
- James Babson as Policeman #2
- Joseph Tremain as Hungry Boy
- Timothy Bateson as Man with a Punch
- Elvis Polanski as Boy with Hoop
- Frank Mills as Elderly Officer
- Nick Stringer as Inspector Blather
- Gerard Horan as Farmer
- Richard Ridings as Warder
- Andy Linden as Mr Gamfield
- Teresa Churcher as Charlotte
- Peter Copley as Dining Hall Master
- Jake Curran as Barney
- Ophelia Lovibond as Bet
- Morgane Polanski as Farmer's Daughter
- Andy de la Tour as Workhouse Master
- Richard Durden as Unkind Board Master

== Production ==
In Twist by Polanski, a DVD bonus feature on the film's home-release, Roman Polanski discusses his decision to make yet another screen adaptation of the Dickens novel. He realised that nearly forty years had passed since a major cinematic version, and felt it was time for a new one. During the interview he remarks that his own childhood as an orphan during World War II in Poland allowed him to identify with the story's penniless protagonist.

Screenwriter Ronald Harwood, with whom Polanski had previously collaborated on The Pianist, welcomed the opportunity to adapt Dickens for the first time in his career. Shots of pickpocketing in the film were choreographed with the assistance of stage pickpocket James Freedman and magician Martyn Rowland (though this is un-credited). Filming took place in Prague, Beroun and Žatec in the Czech Republic.

In an interview with actor Ben Kingsley, he explained his approach to playing Fagin: "I stayed in character the whole time when the children were on the set."

== Music ==
The film is composed by Rachel Portman. "Everlasting" by BoA is the image song for the Japanese release of the film.

== Differences from the novel ==
Due to the novel's complex plot, several characters and events were omitted or altered. The film does not explain where Oliver was raised prior to the workhouse. Mr Bumble's role is reduced—there is no mention of his losing his job at the workhouse. Additionally, the characters of Monks (Oliver's half-brother) and the Widow Corney are absent; the plotline involving the destruction of the locket proving Oliver's identity and the conspiracy of Monks and Fagin in the novel is therefore omitted.

To compensate for Monks' absence, Fagin and Sikes conspire to murder Oliver—an event which does not occur in Dickens' text. In the novel, it is left ambiguous how Oliver and Mr Brownlow are related; this version follows precedent (e.g. previous film adaptions) and makes Brownlow implicitly Oliver's grandfather, though less explicitly than many earlier versions.

Because the Maylie family is absent, Oliver is not left by Sikes to die during the burglary; rather, he is taken back to Fagin's. The Artful Dodger is not deported to Australia (as in the novel) and, therefore, plays a larger role in some of the later events in the film. He is sent by Fagin (instead of Noah Claypole) to spy on Nancy, indirectly causing her death by informing on her. His ultimate fate is left unknown after Sikes' death.

== Reception ==
The film received mixed to generally positive reviews, holding a 61% approval rating on Rotten Tomatoes based on 143 reviews, averaging 6.3/10. The critical consensus on Rotten Tomatoes reads: "Polanski's version of Dickens' classic won't have audiences asking for more because while polished and directed with skill, the movie's a very impersonal experience." On Metacritic the film scored 65/100. Audiences polled by CinemaScore gave the film an average grade of "C+" on an A+ to F scale.

In his review for The New York Times, A. O. Scott called it a "bracingly old-fashioned" film that "does not embalm its source with fussy reverence" but "rediscovers its true and enduring vitality." He added: "The look of the movie [...] is consistent with its interpretation of Dickens's worldview, which could be plenty grim but which never succumbed to despair. There is just enough light, enough grace, enough beauty, to penetrate the gloom and suggest the possibility of redemption. The script [...] is at once efficient and ornate, capturing Dickens's narrative dexterity and his ear for the idioms of English speech."

Roger Ebert of the Chicago Sun-Times was similarly positive, calling the film "visually exact and detailed without being too picturesque." Mick LaSalle of the San Francisco Chronicle praised it as a "grounded and unusually matter-of-fact adaptation", continuing: "Polanski does justice to Dickens' moral universe, in which the motives and worldview of even the worst people are made comprehensible."

Lisa Schwarzbaum of Entertainment Weekly gave the film a grade of B+ and commented: "On the face of it, Roman Polanski's Oliver Twist is in the tradition of every faithful Oliver Twist ever filmed—a photogenic, straightforward, CliffsNotes staging of Charles Dickens' harrowing story [...] Yet precisely because this is by Roman Polanski, it's irresistible to read his sorrowful and seemingly classical take [...] as something much more personal and poignant."

However, Peter Travers of Rolling Stone rated the film two out of four stars, calling it "drab and unfeeling" and lacking the Polanski stamp; he further felt Barney Clark's performance as Oliver was "bereft of personality". Todd McCarthy of Variety echoed Travers' concerns about Clark, labelling him "disappointingly wan and unengaging", while writing that the film was "conventional, straightforward [...] a respectable literary adaptation, but [lacking] dramatic urgency and intriguing undercurrents".

In the British press, Peter Bradshaw of The Guardian opined that while "[Polanski's] Oliver Twist does not flag or lose its way and is always watchable, the book's original power and force have not been rediscovered." Philip French of The Observer wrote that the film was "generally disappointing, though by no means badly acted", and alleged that it lacked "any serious point of view about individuality, society, community".

Box office-wise, the film opened in the U.S. in only five theatres and made $68,447 in its opening weekend. The film opened on 547 screens in France and finished at number two at the box office behind Corpse Bride with an opening five-day gross of $2.3 million. It grossed $42.6 million worldwide—substantially below its $60 million budget.

== Home media ==
Sony Pictures Home Entertainment released the film on DVD on 24 January 2006. It is in anamorphic widescreen format, with English and French audio tracks and subtitles. Bonus features include Twist by Polanski (in which the director reflects on the making of the film), The Best of Twist (interviews with production designer Allan Starski, costume designer Anna B. Sheppard, cinematographer Paweł Edelman, editor Hervé de Luze, and composer Rachel Portman) and Kidding with Oliver Twist (which focuses on the young actors).
