= Nancy (Oliver Twist) =

Character in the novel Oliver Twist

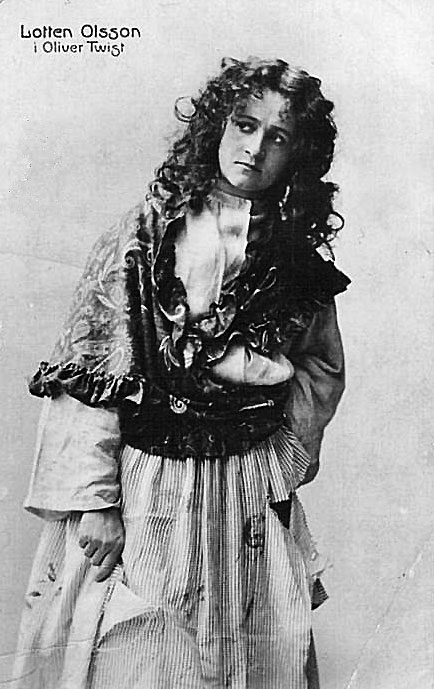
- Lotten Olsson in the role of Nancy
- Created by: Charles Dickens
- Portrayed by: Elita Proctor Otis; Constance Collier; Doris Lloyd; Gladys Brockwell; Georgia Brown; Carmel McSharry; Shani Wallis; Kay Walsh; Cherie Lunghi; Patti LuPone; Amanda Harris; Sally Dexter; Claire Moore; Ruthie Henshall; Emily Woof; Jodie Prenger; Tamsin Carroll; Sarah Lark; Kerry Ellis; Leanne Rowe; Samantha Barks; Kim Engelbrecht; Saira Choudhry; Evelin Samuel; Sophie Okonedo; Cat Simmons; Sophie Simnett; Caite Bailey

In-universe information
- Nickname: Noncy
- Gender: Female
- Occupation: Thief, prostitute

Nancy is a fictional character in the 1838 novel Oliver Twist by Charles Dickens and its several adaptations for theatre, television and films. She is a member of Fagin's gang and the lover, and eventual victim, of Bill Sikes.

As well as Nancy being a thief, a common suggestion is that she is a prostitute, in the modern sense of the word. At no point is this stated directly in the novel; rather it stems from Dickens describing her as such in his preface to the 1841 edition ("the boys are pickpockets, and the girl is a prostitute"). However, it has been speculated that he is invoking the term's then-synonymous usage referring to a woman living out of wedlock or otherwise on the margins of "respectable" society.

In spite of her criminality, Nancy is portrayed as a sympathetic figure, whose concern for Oliver overcomes her loyalty to Sikes and Fagin. By the climax of the novel, she is emaciated with sickness and worry, and filled with guilt about the life she is leading.

== Background ==
Nancy was tainted at a young age by Fagin, the receiver of stolen goods who persuades poor youths to do his bidding. Her exact age is not mentioned in the book, although she says she has been a thief for 12 years (and began working for Fagin when she was half Oliver's age). From this it can be deduced that she is around seventeen years old. She is typically depicted in her 20s in film versions of the novel. She apparently looks older than her years, as she tells Rose Maylie "I am younger than you would think, to look at me, but I am well used to it."

Nancy is one of the members of Fagin's gang that few, if any, know about in central London, since she has recently moved from the suburbs — something referred to by Sikes when he and Fagin, concerned that Oliver might inform on them, are trying to convince her to attend his impending trial after he is mistakenly arrested for pickpocketing ("No one around here knows anything about you"). Her excuse for not attending is that she does not wish anyone to know about her; nevertheless, she winds up attending it, presumably after having been physically threatened by Sikes.

== Description ==
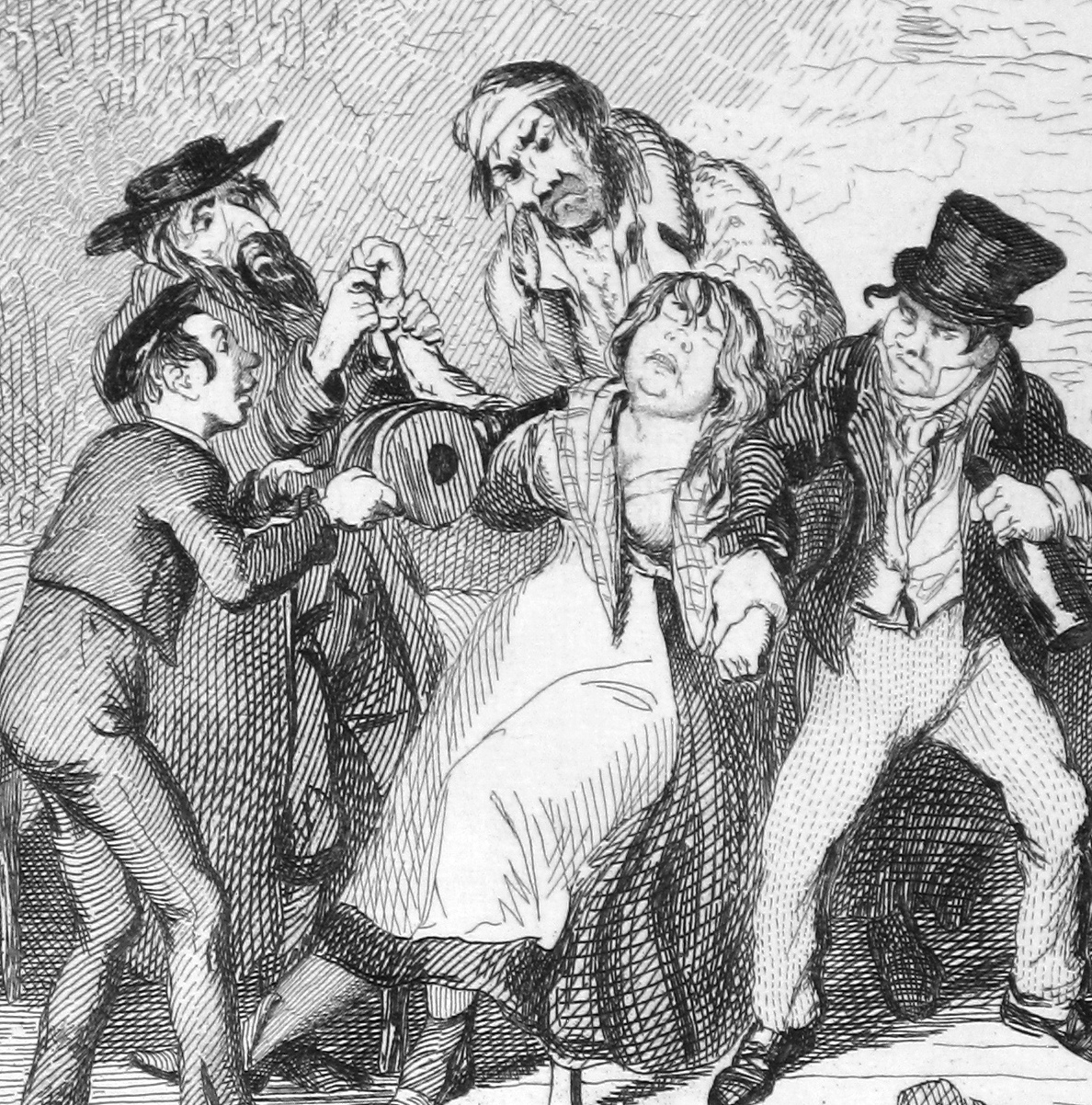
Nancy swooning. The "plump" Nancy as portrayed by George Cruikshank

In the novel she drinks heavily. She is described thus when she first appears:

A couple of young ladies called to see the young gentlemen; one of whom was named Bet, and the other Nancy. They wore a good deal of hair, not very neatly turned up behind, and were rather untidy about the shoes and stockings. They were not exactly pretty, perhaps; but they had a great deal of colour in their faces, and looked quite stout and hearty."

In the original illustrations by George Cruikshank, Nancy is depicted as stout and fleshy, with a round, bulbous face.

By the end of the novel Nancy has dramatically lost weight through anxiety. She is described as "so pale and reduced with watching and privation, that there would have been considerable difficulty in recognising her as the same Nancy who has already figured in this tale."

In the preface, Dickens states in writing dialogue for Nancy that he deliberately avoided using the crude language that would have been used by a real person like Nancy:

No less consulting my own taste, than the manners of the age, I endeavoured, while I painted it in all its fallen and degraded aspect, to banish from the lips of the lowest character I introduced, any expression that could by possibility offend; and rather to lead to the unavoidable inference that its existence was of the most debased and vicious kind, than to prove it elaborately by words and deeds. In the case of the girl, in particular, I kept this intention constantly in view.

Instead, Nancy and her friend Bet are introduced using faux-genteel terminology, portrayed as if seen though Oliver's innocent eyes, but recognisably ironic to the reader. Bet's brash refusal to get something for Fagin is described as "a polite and delicate evasion of the request" showing "the young lady to have been possessed of natural good-breeding." Nancy's visit to the magistrates is described in similar language. Only later, when Nancy speaks to Rose, does she explicitly describe herself as degraded and corrupted. Their criminal enterprises are spoken of in euphemisms, creating for the reader a "game of guessing the crime".

== Relationship to Oliver ==
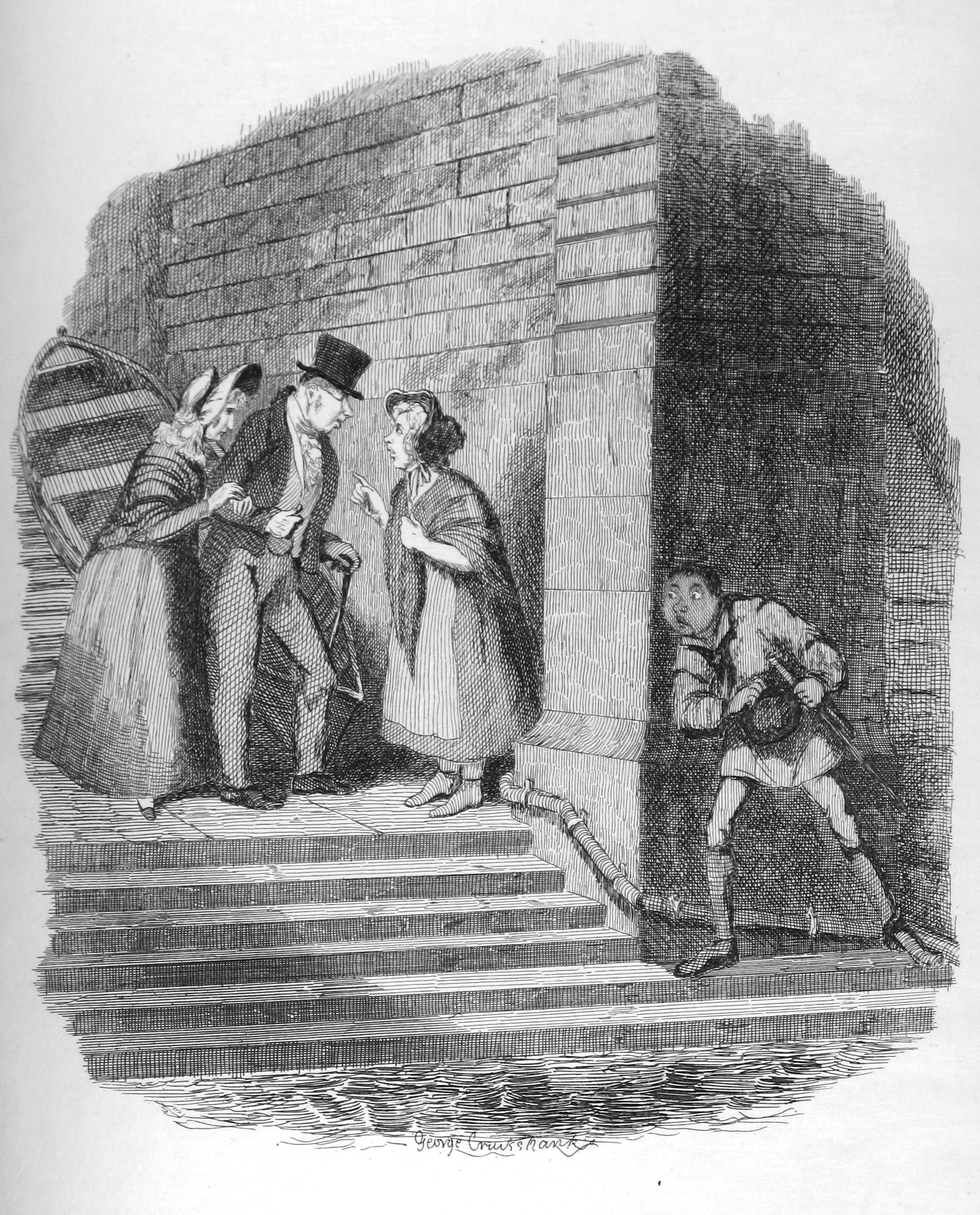
Nancy meets Mr. Brownlow and Rose at London Bridge to plan how to save Oliver

Nancy, who is fiercely protective of Oliver and harbours a great deal of motherly affection and pity for him, tries to prevent him from being kidnapped a second time, after Oliver has finally managed to find safety in the household of the Maylie family, whom Sikes tried unsuccessfully to rob. She gives Rose Maylie and Mr Brownlow, Oliver's benefactor, information about Oliver's evil half-brother Monks, who is in league with Fagin. However, she has managed to keep Bill's name out of it. But Fagin has sent a spy (Noah) out after her, and when the spy reports on what he has heard and seen, Fagin, furious at what she has done, tells Sikes about her actions. However, he twists the story just enough to make it sound as if she informed on him, knowing that this will probably result in her being murdered and thus silenced. It is her murder and the subsequent search for Sikes, her killer, that helps bring down Fagin's gang.

Nancy commits one of the most noble acts of kindness in the story when she ultimately defies Bill, in order to help Oliver to a better life, and she is subsequently martyred for it. Her character represented Dickens' view that a person, however tainted by society, could still retain a sense of good and redeem for past crimes but will surely be paid back for their bad deeds committed before. One of the main reasons Dickens puts Nancy in Oliver Twist is so that she can be contrasted with the pure, gentle Rose Maylie.

== Role of the character ==
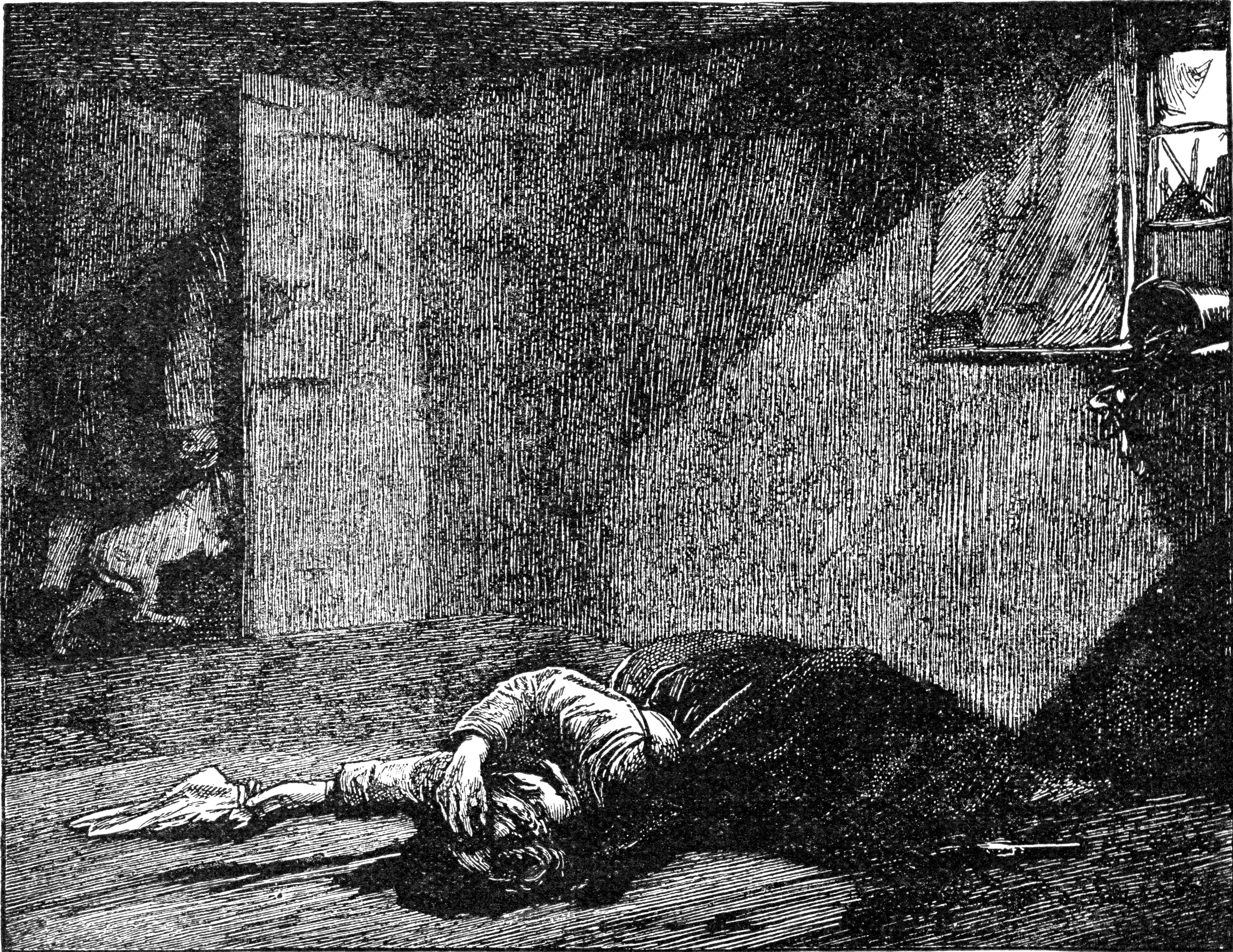
Nancy lying dead, by James Mahoney

Dickens was criticized for featuring a positive character that was a thief. However, he defended his decision in the preface to the 1841 edition, explaining that it was his intention to show criminals, however petty, in "all their deformity", and that he had thought that dressing Nancy in anything other than "a cheap shawl" would make her seem more fanciful than real as a character.

Nancy is one of literature's earliest examples of the stock character of the "tart with a heart"—the stereotypical character of a tragic or fallen woman who makes her way through life through crime, but is still a good and compassionate person.

== Media portrayals ==
Numerous prominent actresses have played the character of Nancy:

In the 1928 Radio Liverpool adaptation, Nancy was portrayed by Mrs. Fred Wilkinson.

In the 1934 BBC Regional Programme serial adaptation, Barbara Couper played Nancy.

In the 1941 BBC Home Service serial adaptation, Nancy is played by Belle Chrystall.

In the 1948 film Oliver Twist, Kay Walsh portrayed Nancy.

In the 1952 BBC Home Service serial adaptation, Helen Shingler played Nancy.

In the 1960 London and 1963 Broadway stage productions of Oliver!, Nancy was portrayed by Georgia Brown.

In the 1962 BBC TV serial, Nancy is portrayed by Carmel McSharry.

In the 1968 British musical film Oliver!, Nancy is portrayed by Shani Wallis.

In the 1970 BBC Radio 4 serial adaptation, Patricia Leventon played Nancy.

In the 1982 made-for-TV movie version, Nancy is portrayed by Cherie Lunghi.

In the 1985 miniseries, Nancy is portrayed by Amanda Harris.

In the 1994 BBC Radio 4 serial adaptation, Adjoa Andoh played Nancy.

In the 1984 Broadway revival of the musical Oliver!, Nancy was played by Patti LuPone.

In the 1994 London revival of the musical Oliver!, Nancy was played by Sally Dexter, later by Claire Moore and Ruthie Henshall.

In Disney's live action television production Oliver Twist (1997), Nancy is played by Antoine Byrne. However, unlike most versions, Nancy is murdered on the London Bridge instead of in her room by Sikes. Rita the saluki in Disney's 1988 animated film Oliver and Company is entirely based on Nancy.

In the 1999 miniseries, Nancy is portrayed by Emily Woof.

In Twist, Michèle-Barbara Pelletier plays the role of Nancy.

In Boy Called Twist, Kim Engelbrecht plays the role of Nancy.

In the 2005 Roman Polanski movie, Oliver Twist, Nancy is portrayed by Leanne Rowe.

In a 2007 BBC television adaptation, Nancy is played by Sophie Okonedo.

In the 2009 London revival of the musical Oliver!, Nancy was played by Jodie Prenger, later by Kerry Ellis.

In the 2015 miniseries Dickensian, Nancy is played by Bethany Muir.

In Twist, Nancy is played by Sophie Simnett. Unlike most adaptations, however, she is portrayed as a younger girl known as "Red" and Oliver's love interest despite her supposed relationship to a female version of Sikes.

In the 2023 Encores! revival of the musical Oliver!, Nancy was played by Lilli Cooper.

== See also ==
- I'd Do Anything (BBC TV series)
