= Anthony Finigan =

British actor

Anthony "Tony" Finigan was a British theatre, television, radio and film actor, and stage and TV director. He began his career in 1948 as an assistant stage manager.

Born in 1926 in Islington, North London, he was educated at Merchant Taylors' School, Northwood.

Film roles included Oliver Twist (1997) and Colin Bateman's Cycle of Violence and Divorcing Jack (both 1998). His final role was in Richard Attenborough's Closing the Ring (2008).

== Family ==
His wife since 1952, Primrose "Prim" Finigan, died in 2004. Suffering from progressive dementia, he died on 5 February 2009, aged 83. He was survived by three daughters and six grandchildren.
