= Sam Smith (actor) =

English actor, born 1989

Sam Smith (born 9 August 1989) is an English former child actor. He played the title role in the 1999 ITV series Oliver Twist and played David Wiseman in the 2003 film Wondrous Oblivion.
