= Oliver Twist (1948 film) =

British film by David Lean

- Theatrical release poster
- Directed by: David Lean
- Written by: David Lean; Stanley Haynes
- Based on: Oliver Twist; 1837 novel by Charles Dickens
- Produced by: Ronald Neame; Anthony Havelock-Allan
- Starring: Alec Guinness; Robert Newton; Kay Walsh; John Howard Davies; Anthony Newley; Diana Dors
- Cinematography: Guy Green
- Edited by: Jack Harris
- Music by: Arnold Bax
- Production company: Cineguild
- Distributed by: General Film Distributors
- Release date: 22 June 1948 (London)
- Running time: 116 minutes (UK)
- Country: United Kingdom
- Language: English
- Budget: £371,500
- Box office: £380,400

Oliver Twist is a 1948 British film and the second of David Lean's two film adaptations of Charles Dickens novels. Following his 1946 version of Great Expectations, Lean re-assembled much of the same team for his adaptation of Dickens' 1838 novel, including producers Ronald Neame and Anthony Havelock-Allan, cinematographer Guy Green, designer John Bryan and editor Jack Harris. Lean's then-wife, Kay Walsh, who had collaborated on the screenplay for Great Expectations, played the role of Nancy. John Howard Davies was cast as Oliver, while Alec Guinness portrayed Fagin and Robert Newton played Bill Sykes (Bill Sikes in the novel).

In 1999, the British Film Institute placed it at 46th in its list of the top 100 British films. In 2005 it was named in the BFI list of the 50 films you should see by the age of 14.

== Plot ==
A young pregnant woman (Note: Agnes Fleming, the mother's name from Dickens' novel, is neither credited on-screen nor heard in dialog.) limps through a thunderstorm to Parish Workhouse, giving birth before dying. Her nurse, "Old Sally", covetously eyes her gold locket. The delivering doctor sighs, "The old story. No wedding ring." Sally boards the newborn boy.

Oliver Twist cried lustily. If he had known that he was to grow up under the tender mercies of the Beadle and the Matron, he would have cried even louder.

— Screen caption

Nine years later: The workhouse matron and widow, Mrs. Corney, has cruelly treated the boys. Parochial beadle Mr. Bumble – who invented Oliver's surname Twist – presents Oliver on his birthday to the Board. A member hopes Oliver prays every night, and its Chairman insists he "be educated and taught a useful trade," picking oakum; tedious, slow and taxing work. Meals for Oliver and the other boys consist of only gruel and a bit of bread, while board members devour roasted meats, potatoes, fresh vegetables and cake. The boys draw straws; after losing, Oliver approaches and asks, "Please, sir, I want some more." The workhouse master is outraged. As punishment, Bumble sells Oliver for £5 to apprentice at Abel Sowerberry, Coffin Maker & Undertaker. Oliver is assigned the role of a mute, walking behind the coffin in children's funerals

Old Sally arrives at Sowerberry's looking for Oliver, but collapses. Back at the workhouse Mrs Corney is brought to the bedside of the dying woman, who speaks to her in private. Sowerberry's older apprentice Noah Claypole calls Oliver "Workhouse" and insults his dead mother. Oliver flies into a rampage, attacking Noah and hitting Charlotte, the maid, and Mrs. Sowerberry who attempt to subdue him. They throw Oliver into the coal hole. No longer afraid, Oliver shouts defiantly at Bumble, earning lashes from Mr. Sowerberry. The next morning, Oliver escapes the torture.

So Oliver Twist set out for London – that great large place – nobody – not even Mr. Bumble – could ever find him there.

— Screen caption

Oliver travels seven days to London and is overwhelmed by the crowds. He is befriended by young pickpocket the Artful Dodger, who introduces him to the miserly, elderly Fagin, a criminal who trains a gang of boys to steal. Secretly, Fagin colludes with mystery man Monks, who pays him to turn Oliver into a criminal. Unaware of the real purpose of their "work", Oliver goes out with Dodger and Charlie Bates. He is shocked when the two steal a handkerchief from a gentleman outside a book shop, but when the bookseller cries "stop thief," Dodger and Charlie get away while Oliver is arrested. Fearing Oliver will talk and bring police to their hideout, Fagin and his vicious associate Bill Sykes send Bill's lover Nancy to police court. When the exhausted and injured Oliver faints, the bookseller arrives to insist he wasn't the thief, exonerating the boy. The compassionate Mr. Brownlow, the victim of the theft, takes Oliver to his Pentonville home.

Monks pays Bumble, now workhouse master, for information about Oliver. Widow Corney, now Mrs. Bumble, reveals Sally's dying declaration, "I robbed her. . . . She charged me to keep it safe." Sally had taken Oliver's mother's locket and pawned it, Mrs. Bumble found the pawnbroker's ticket, which she redeemed. Monks opens the locket, revealing a woman's portrait – the only evidence of Oliver's identity.

Oliver is welcomed by Brownlow and his housekeeper Mrs. Bedwin. Brownlow's friend Mr. Grimwig is suspicious of the boy's honesty. When the boy has recovered from his illness, Brownlow sends him to return books to the shop. Sykes and Nancy abduct Oliver and take him back to Fagin's hideout. Regretting her participation, Nancy vehemently defends Oliver to them and attacks Fagin, who made her a thief when she was a child. Mrs. Bedwin refutes Grimwig's suspicion that Oliver stole the books and money from Brownlow, who distributes "Five Guineas Reward" posters to find the boy.

At Three Cripples tavern, Nancy eavesdrops on Fagin and learns Monks' intentions for Oliver, claiming he has "got the young devil's money at last." Alerted to Nancy's eavesdropping by the pub landlord, Fagin pays Artful to "dodge" her. When Sykes takes Oliver to commit robbery, Nancy meets Brownlow at London Bridge and tells him of Monks' plan, unaware that Dodger is listening. Fagin has Dodger tell Bill that she planned to drug him with laudanum to return Oliver. At their Whitechapel flat, Bill brutally clubs Nancy to death, his terrified English Bull Terrier Bull's Eye scramble-scratches to escape the chilling murder. Horrified by what he's done, Bill leaves the flat, and Bull's Eye runs away.

Dodger discovers Nancy's corpse the next morning. Hearing of the murder through public announcement, Brownlow goes to the police and identifies Nancy as the woman he met the preceding day. Believing her murder releases him from his promise not to reveal the names of her associates, he gives them information leading to the issue of notices: "Wanted for Murder" (Sykes); "Wanted for Abduction...receiving stolen goods" (Fagin); and "Wanted for Fraud" (Monks, alias Edward Leeford). Monks is arrested and brought to Brownlow, who has realised that Oliver is his grandson. Their association with Monks discovered, Bumble and Corney are fired. Sykes unsuccessfully tries drowning Bull's Eye. He forces his way into Fagin's latest hideout, but Bull's Eye barks outside, drawing the mob that batters through, arresting Fagin. Dragging Oliver with him, Sykes tries climbing across the rooftops. Brownlow offers £50 to whoever rescues Oliver. A police officer shoots Sykes, who falls, accidentally hanging himself on rope secured around a chimney.

Oliver goes to live with Grandfather Brownlow, finally finding the family he sought.

== Cast ==
- Robert Newton as Bill Sykes
- Alec Guinness as Fagin
- Kay Walsh as Nancy
- Francis L. Sullivan as Mr. Bumble
- Henry Stephenson as Mr. Brownlow
- Mary Clare as Mrs. Corney
- Anthony Newley as the Artful Dodger
- Josephine Stuart as Oliver's Mother
- Ralph Truman as Monks
- Kathleen Harrison as Mrs. Sowerberry
- Gibb McLaughlin as Mr. Sowerberry, the undertaker
- Amy Veness as Mrs. Bedwin
- Diana Dors as Charlotte
- Frederick Lloyd as Mr. Grimwig
- John Howard Davies as Oliver Twist
- Henry Edwards as Police Official
- Ivor Barnard as Chairman of the Board
- Maurice Denham as Chief of Police
- Michael Dear as Noah Claypole
- Michael Ripper as Barney
- Peter Bull as Landlord of "Three Cripples" tavern
- Deidre Doyle as Mrs. Thingummy, "Old Sally"
- Kenneth Downy as Workhouse Master
- W.G. Fay as Bookseller
- Edie Martin as Annie
- Fay Middleton as Martha
- John Potter as Charlie Bates
- Maurice Jones as Workhouse Doctor
- Hattie Jacques and Betty Paul as Singers at "Three Cripples" tavern
- Joan Steadman as Orphan

== Antisemitism controversy ==
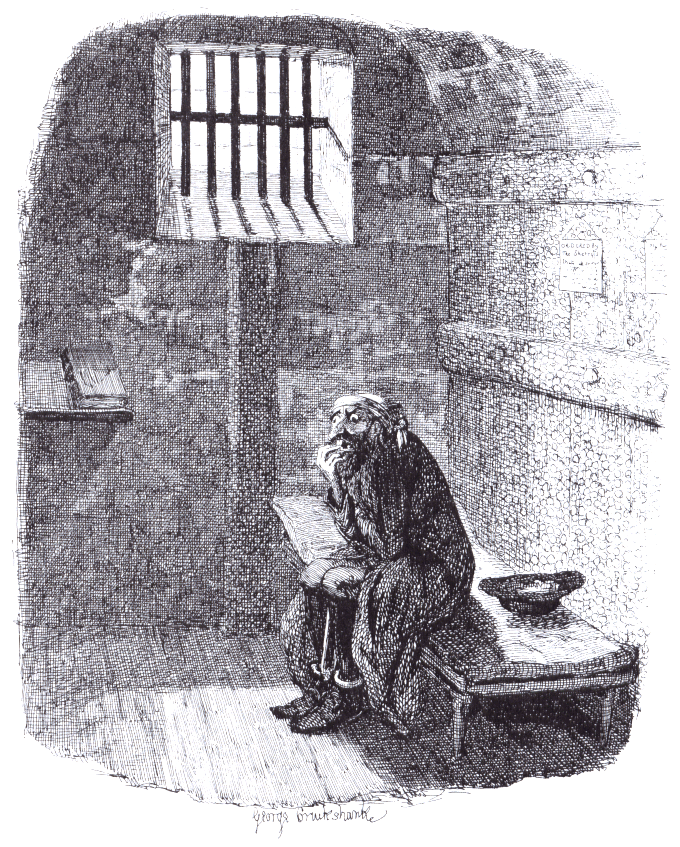
Cruikshank – Fagin in the condemned Cell

Although critically acclaimed, Alec Guinness's portrayal of Fagin and his make-up was considered antisemitic by some as it was felt to perpetuate Jewish racial stereotypes. Guinness wore heavy make-up, including a large prosthetic nose, to make him look like the character as he appeared in George Cruikshank's illustrations in the first edition of the novel. At the start of production, the Production Code Administration had advised David Lean to "bear in mind the advisability of omitting from the portrayal of Fagin any elements or inference that would be offensive to any specific racial group or religion."

Lean commissioned the make-up artist Stuart Freeborn to create Fagin's features; Freeborn had suggested to David Lean that Fagin's exaggerated profile should be toned down for fear of causing offence, but Lean rejected this idea. In a screen test featuring Guinness in toned-down make-up, Fagin was said to resemble Jesus Christ. On this basis, Lean decided to continue filming with a faithful reproduction of Cruikshank's Fagin, pointing out that Fagin was not explicitly identified as Jewish in the screenplay.

When released in 1948, the film was criticized by American columnist Albert Deutsch, who had seen the film in London. Deutsch wrote that even Dickens "'could not make Fagin half so horrible,' and warned that the film would fan the flames of anti-Semitism." The New York Board of Rabbis appealed to Eric Johnston, head of the Production Code Administration, to keep the film out of the U.S. Other Jewish groups also objected, and the Rank Organization announced in September 1948, that U.S. release was "indefinitely postponed."

As a result of such protests, the film was not released in the United States until 1951, with 12 minutes of footage removed. It received great acclaim from critics, but, unlike Lean's Great Expectations, another Dickens adaptation, no Oscar nominations. The film was banned in Israel for antisemitism. It was banned by British Occupation censoring authorities in Egypt concerning portraying Fagin too sympathetically.

The March 1949 release of the film in Germany was met with protests outside the Kurbel Cinema by Jewish objectors. The Mayor of Berlin, Ernst Reuter, was a signatory to their petition which called for the withdrawal of the film. The depiction of Fagin was considered especially problematic in the recent aftermath of The Holocaust.

Beginning in the 1970s, exhibitors began to show the full-length version of Lean's film in the United States. It is that version which is now available on DVD.

== Reception ==
=== Box office ===
The film was the fifth most popular film at the British box office in 1948. According to Kinematograph Weekly the 'biggest winner' at the box office in 1948 Britain was The Best Years of Our Lives with Spring in Park Lane being the best British film and "runners up" being It Always Rains on Sunday, My Brother Jonathan, Road to Rio, Miranda, An Ideal Husband, The Naked City, The Red Shoes, Green Dolphin Street, Forever Amber, Life with Father, The Weaker Sex, Oliver Twist, The Fallen Idol and The Winslow Boy.

The producer's receipts were £277,300 in the UK and £103,100 overseas. According to Rank's own records the film had made a profit of £8,000 for the company by December 1949.

=== Critical ===
After the belated release of the film in the United States, Bosley Crowther praised it in The New York Times, writing:

"...it is safe to proclaim that it is merely a superb piece of motion picture art and, beyond doubt, one of the finest screen translations of a literary classic ever made."

On Rotten Tomatoes, the film has an approval rating of 100% based on reviews from 22 critics, with an average rating of 8.8/10. The site's critics' consensus reads:

"David Lean brings the grimy beauty of Charles Dickens' Victorian England to vivid cinematic life in Oliver Twist, a marvelous adaptation that benefits from Guy Green's haunting cinematography and Alec Guinness' off-kilter performance."

== Legacy ==
Author Marc Napolitano noted that Lean's version of Oliver Twist had an impact on almost every subsequent adaptation of Dickens's novel. The film had two major additions that were not in the original novel. Of the opening scene, an idea that originated from Kay Walsh, Napolitano wrote:

"The opening scene, which depicts the beleaguered and pregnant Agnes limping her way to the parish workhouse in the midst of a thunderstorm, presents a haunting image that would resonate with subsequent adaptors. Even more significantly, the finale to the Lean adaptation has eclipsed Dickens's own finale in the popular memory of the story; the climax atop the roof of Fagin's lair is breathtaking."

Songwriter Lionel Bart acknowledged that Lean's film "played a role in his conception" of the musical Oliver! (also shot by Oswald Morris) Lean biographer Stephen Silverman referred to the 1968 film version of Oliver! as "more of an uncredited adaptation of the Lean film in story line and look than of either the Dickens novel or the Bart stage show."

Katharyn Crabbe wrote:

"One common complaint about the form of Dickens' Oliver Twist has been that the author fell so in love with his young hero that he could not bear to make him suffer falling into Fagin's hands a third time and so made him an idle spectator in the final half of the book."

Author Edward LeComte credited Lean for resolving the issue in his film version, where Oliver remains "at the center of the action" and has a "far more heroic" role.

== See also ==
- BFI Top 100 British films

== Bibliography ==
- Vermilye, Jerry. (1978). The Great British Films. Citadel Press, pp. 117–120. ISBN 0-8065-0661-X.
