= Mr. Bumble =

Fictional character in Oliver Twist

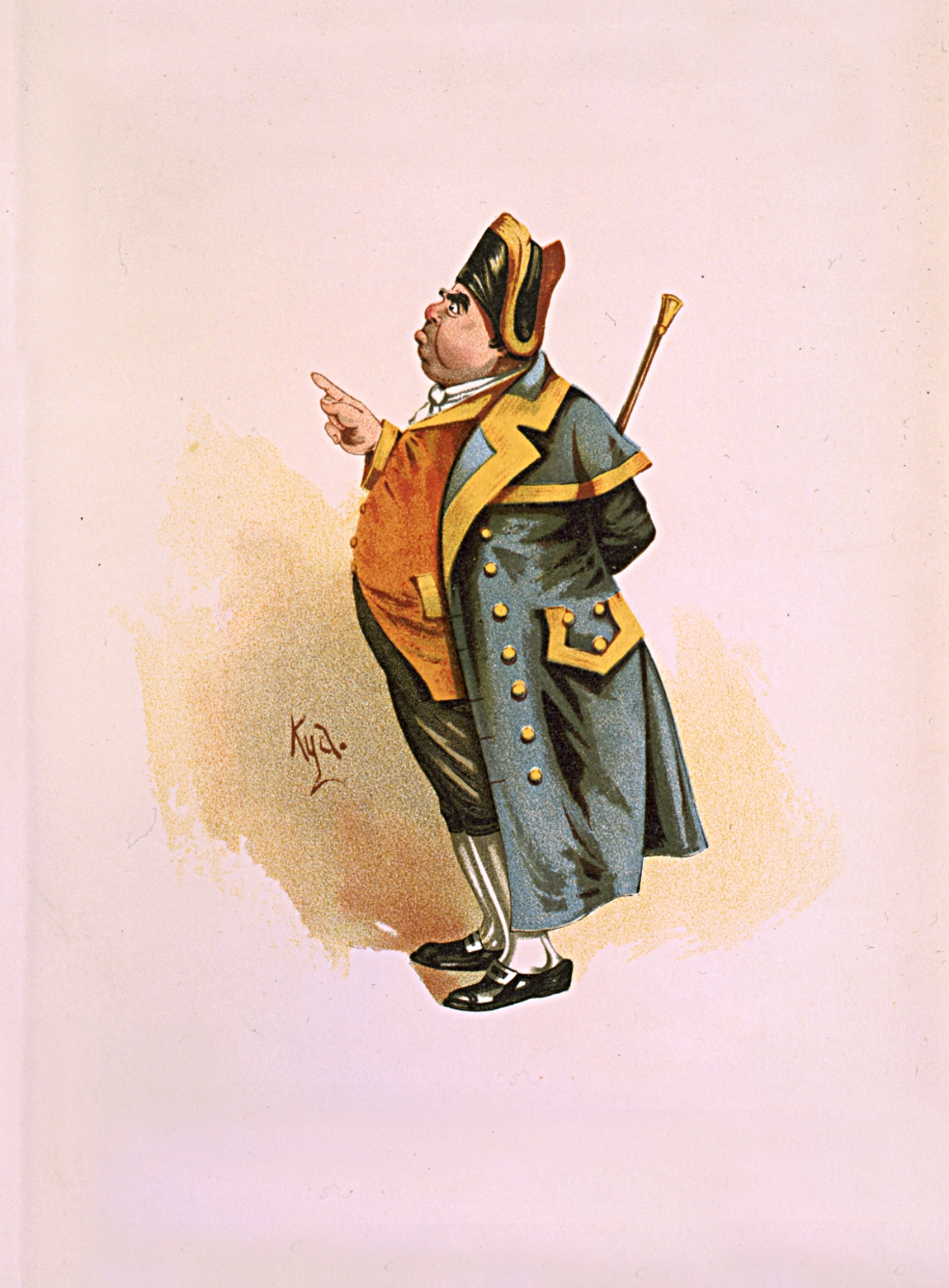
- Watercolour painting of Mr. Bumble by Joseph Clayton Clark (1889)
- Created by: Charles Dickens

In-universe information
- Gender: Male
- Occupation: Parish official

Mr. Bumble is a fictional character and minor antagonist in the 1838 novel Oliver Twist by Charles Dickens.

== Description ==
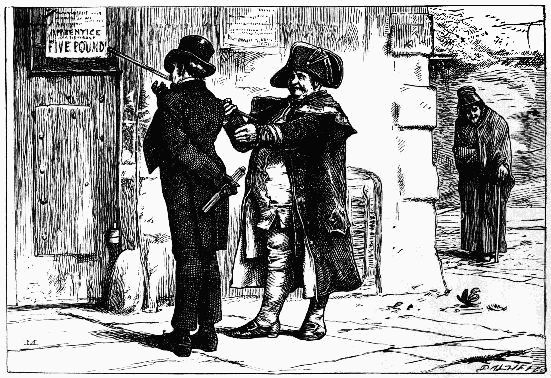
Bumble points out the notice to Mr Sowerberry offering Oliver Twist

When the story was first serialised in Bentley's Miscellany in 1837, Mr. Bumble is the cruel and self-important beadle – a minor parish official – who oversees the parish workhouse and orphanage of Mudfog, a country town more than 75 mi (121 km) from London where the orphaned Oliver Twist is brought up. The allusion to Mudfog was removed when the novel was published as a book. He is described as "A fat man, and a choleric ... Mr. Bumble had a great idea of his oratorical powers and his importance."

While Mr. Bumble preaches Christian principles, he himself fails to live up to these lofty ideals by behaving without compassion or mercy toward the paupers under his charge. In his novels Dickens chose his characters' names carefully and 'Bumble' lives up to the symbolism of his name through his displays of self-importance, greed, hypocrisy and foolishness.

== Fictional biography ==
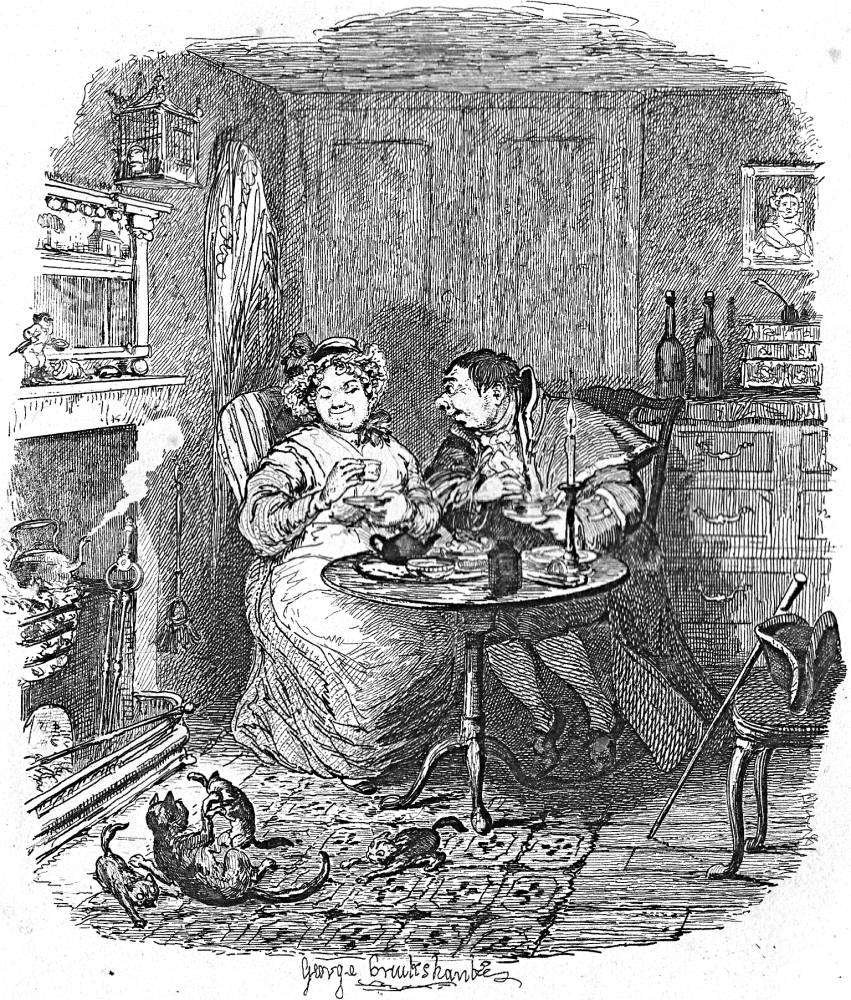
"Mr. Bumble and Mrs. Corney taking tea" – George Cruikshank (1838)

Originally the beadle in charge of the workhouse where Oliver is, Mr. Bumble later woos the widow Mrs. Corney, the matron of the workhouse, in hopes of gaining her property. His amorous feelings being reciprocated, the two soon marry but Bumble's new wife turns out to be a sharp-tongued and tyrannical woman who nags and browbeats him. After two months of marriage, Bumble is no longer beadle but is now Master of the workhouse; however, he is not happy with his more advanced situation.

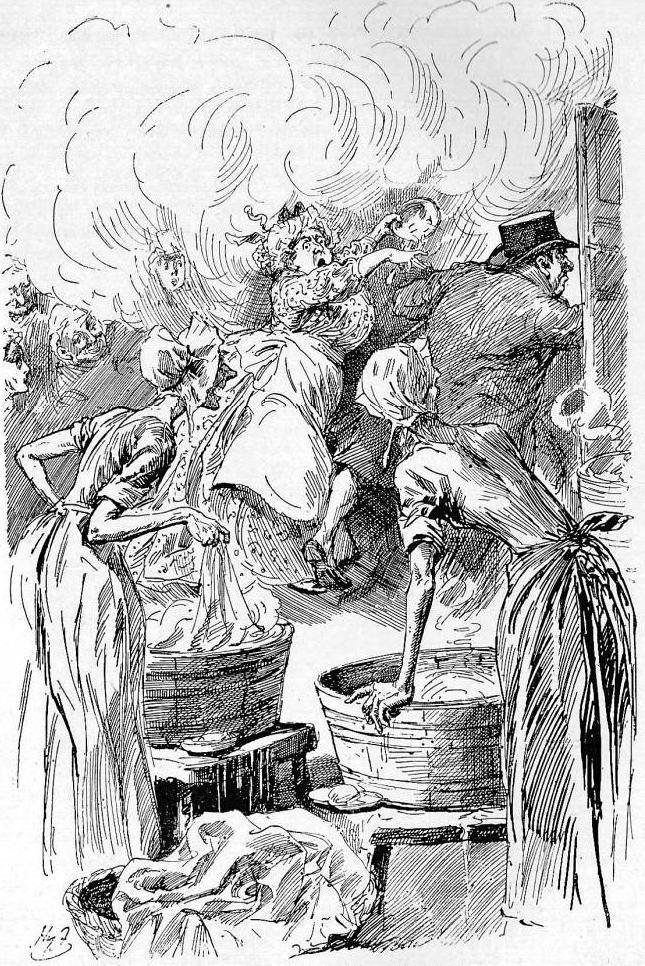
Bumble humiliated by his wife before the paupers – Harry Furniss (1910)

Bumble receives a more public humiliation at the hands of his wife when he attempts to enter the workhouse as the new master, only to be driven out by her before the paupers. When later in the novel Bumble is astonished to discover from Mr Brownlow that in the law a husband is responsible for the actions of his wife he famously declares that: “If the law supposes that – the law is a ass – a idiot. If that's the eye of the law, the law's a bachelor; and the worse I may wish the law is, that his eye may be opened by experience — by experience."

The former Mrs. Corney had been in attendance at the death of the nurse Sally Thingummy and purloined the locket and ring Sally Thingummy had taken from Oliver's mother as she tended her on her deathbed. Monks buys these items from the Bumbles and throws them into the River Thames, hoping that, by destroying them, Oliver's true identity will remain hidden. When they are exposed as being complicit in Monks' plot, Bumble and his wife are deprived of their offices and themselves are reduced to becoming paupers in the workhouse where once they had caused so much misery and suffering to others (and where they are forcibly divorced or at least separated).

The expression "Bumbledom" is named after the character and is used to describe the "meddlesome self-importance of the petty bureaucrat".

== Media portrayals ==
Actors who have played Mr. Bumble include:

=== Film ===
- Oliver Twist (1912) – Stuart Holmes
- Oliver Twist (1916) – Harry Rattenbury
- Oliver Twist (1919) – József Hajdú
- Oliver Twist (1922) – James A. Marcus
- Oliver Twist (1933) – Lionel Belmore
- Oliver Twist (1948) – Francis L. Sullivan
- Oliver! (1968) – Harry Secombe
- Oliver Twist (1974) – Larry D. Mann (voice actor for animated film)
- Las Aventuras de Oliver Twist (1987) – Juan Domingo
- Oliver Twist (2005) – Jeremy Swift

=== Television ===
- Oliver and the Artful Dodger (1972 TV film) – Ronald Long
- The Further Adventures of Oliver Twist (1980 TV series) – Harold Innocent
- Oliver Twist (1982) – Timothy West
- Oliver Twist (1985) – Godfrey James
- Saban's Adventures of Oliver Twist (1996–1997) – Will Ryan. In this version, instead of a human, Mr. Bumble resembles a wolf.
- Oliver Twist (1999) – David Ross
- Oliver Twist (2007) – Gregor Fisher
- Dickensian (2015 TV series) – Richard Ridings

=== Theatre ===
- Oliver Twist (1868) – Lionel Brough at the Queen's Theatre, Long Acre
- Oliver! (1960) – Paul Whitsun-Jones / Robert Bridges / Rob Inglis (original London production)
- Oliver! (1963) – Willoughby Goddard (original Broadway production)
- Oliver! (1965) – Alan Crofoot (Broadway revival)
- Oliver! (1983) – Peter Bayliss (London revival)
- Oliver! (1984) – Michael McCarty (Broadway revival)
- Oliver! (1994) – James Saxon (London revival)
- Oliver! (2009) – Julius D'Silva (London revival)
- Oliver! (2023) – Brad Oscar (New York City Center Encores! revival)
