= Bill Sikes =

Fictional character in the novel Oliver Twist by Charles Dickens

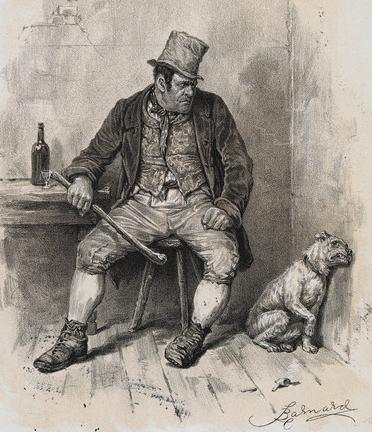
- Bill Sikes by Fred Barnard
- Created by: Charles Dickens
- Portrayed by: George Siegmann (1922); William "Stage" Boyd (1933); Robert Newton (1948); Danny Sewell (1960); Peter Vaughan (1962); Oliver Reed (1968); Tim Curry (1982); Michael Attwell (1985); Miles Anderson (1994); Michael McAnallen (1995); Jack Pocorobba (1996); David O'Hara (1997); Andy Serkis (1999); Jamie Foreman (2005); Tom Hardy (2007); Burn Gorman (2009); Steven Hartley (2009); Shannon Wise (2010); Jake Thomas (2011); Anthony Brown (2015); Scott Dylan (2019); Lena Headey (2021); Sam C. Wilson (2022); Charbel Reyfouni (2022); Tam Mutu (2023); Evan Lister (2023); Aaron Sidwell (2024)
- Voiced by: Robert Loggia (1988)

In-universe information
- Full name: William Sikes
- Gender: Male
- Occupation: Criminal; Robber
- Significant other: Nancy (love interest)

William Sikes is a fictional character and one of the main antagonists (alongside Monks) in the 1838 novel Oliver Twist by Charles Dickens. Sikes is a malicious criminal in Fagin's gang, and a vicious robber and murderer. Throughout much of the novel Sikes is shadowed by his “bull-terrier” dog Bull's-eye.

== Role in the novel ==
Dickens describes his first appearance:

The man who growled out these words, was a stoutly-built fellow of about five-and-thirty, in a black velveteen coat, very soiled drab breeches, lace-up half-boots, and grey cotton stockings which enclosed a bulky pair of legs, with large swelling calves—the kind of legs, which in such costume, always look in an unfinished and incomplete state without a set of fetters to garnish them. He had a brown hat on his head, and a dirty belcher handkerchief round his neck: with the long frayed ends of which he smeared the beer from his face as he spoke. He disclosed, when he had done so, a broad heavy countenance with a beard of three days' growth, and two scowling eyes; one of which displayed various parti-coloured symptoms of having been recently damaged by a blow.

His girlfriend Nancy reluctantly tolerates, but is intimidated by, his violent behaviour. When he thinks Nancy has betrayed him, Sikes murders her. After police identify him as travelling with a dog, Sikes attempts to drown Bull's-eye to rid himself of his companion. In the end while trying to escape over the rooftops via a rope, a vision of the murdered Nancy's eyes terrifies him into losing his balance, falling with the looped rope around his neck and accidentally hanging himself.

Sikes lives in Bethnal Green and later moves to the squalid rookery area of London then called Jacob's Island, east of present-day Shad Thames. As the book focuses on Oliver Twist, Sikes's origins and early life prior to joining Fagin are not mentioned.

== Theatrical, cinematic, TV and radio portrayals ==
=== Theatre ===
In the theatre, Sikes was played by Richard John Smith in Oliver Twist; or, The Parish Boy's Progress (1839), and by Henry Irving opposite Nelly Moore as Nancy in Oliver Twist at the Queen's Theatre in London (1868).

Sikes was played by Danny Sewell in both the original West End and Broadway productions of the stage musical Oliver! which won several awards in the early 1960s. Sikes was played by Graeme Campbell in the 1984 Broadway revival, Miles Anderson (later Steven Hartley) in the 1994 London revival, Burn Gorman (later Steven Hartley again) in the 2009 London revival and by Tam Mutu in the 2023 Encores! revival. Aaron Sidwell has played the role since July 2024, in Cameron Mackintosh’s revival at both Chichester Festival Theatre and Gielgud Theatre in London.

=== Film ===
Robert Newton first played Sikes on screen in the 1948 British film noir Oliver Twist. Sikes's death is changed slightly: while attempting to swing to another building to escape the mob, he is shot by a police officer and dies while dangling from a building by a rope around his body. Perhaps Newton's portrayal is the closest to how Dickens himself envisioned the character: a vicious, heavy drinking sociopath.

Oliver Reed played Sikes in the 1968 film adaptation of Oliver! which also won several awards, including the Oscar for Best Picture. His songs are removed from the film, making his performance of the character closer to that of the novel rather than the stage version. The famous climax of the 1948 film adaptation is retained and Sikes dies in the same manner of being shot and his body dangling from the rope.

In Disney's animated version, Oliver & Company (1988), Sikes (here spelled Sykes) is reimagined as a cold-hearted loan shark who lives and works in a New York shipyard and is voiced by Robert Loggia, who was cast in the role after Marlon Brando rejected an offer to voice the character because he felt the film was going to be a flop. Sikes's dog from the novel, Bull's-eye, is replaced by two Dobermans named Roscoe and DeSoto. Fagin, here depicted as a hobo living with several dogs, owes him money before Sykes proceeds to kidnap a young wealthy girl, Jenny Foxworth, planning to take a ransom to himself. In a final confrontation, Sykes chases Fagin and the dogs into the subway tunnels in attempt to recapture Jenny until they reach the Brooklyn Bridge. While Roscoe and DeSoto are killed when they fall onto the electrified railway, Sykes fights with Oliver and Dodger on the roof of his limousine, and is brutally killed when his car collides with a train, sending his corpse falling into the East River.

In the 2004 movie, Boy Called Twist, Sikes is played by Bart Fouche.

In the 2021 movie, Twist, Sikes is altered into a female portrayed by Lena Headey with a pet Doberman named Bull's-eye and appears to be a lesbian when seen in a supposed relationship with Nancy.

=== Television ===
Peter Vaughan portrayed Sikes in the BBC's 1962 television adaptation, which saw the character portrayed in a gritty, violent way considered to be faithful to the original book. The scene where he brutally murders Nancy was very controversial at the time, with questions being asked in parliament if the serial should've even been allowed to air.

In 1982, Tim Curry portrayed Bill Sikes in the American-British made-for-television film adaptation, Oliver Twist.

In the 1985 BBC TV serial, Oliver Twist, Bill Sikes was portrayed by Michael Attwell.

In the 1996 animated series, Saban's Adventures of Oliver Twist, Bill Sikes is reimagined as a brown bear. A brutish ruffian of a man who makes threats by extortion and intimidation to gain his money. He is sometimes accompanied by a gang of thieving river rats with Big Cheese as his second-in-command.

In Disney's 1997 live-action television production, Oliver Twist, Bill Sikes is played by David O'Hara. In the 2005 Oliver Twist Bill Sikes is played by Jamie Foreman.

In 2007, Sikes is portrayed by actor Tom Hardy in the BBC One miniseries Oliver Twist, later aired in the United States on PBS' Masterpiece Classic.

In the 2015 BBC TV series Dickensian, Sikes is played by Mark Stanley.

=== Radio ===
The very first radio portrayal of Bill Sikes was on British radio in 1928 by Philip H. Harper. Successive radio Sikes included Matthew Boulton in 1934 on the BBC Regional Programme, Allan Jeaves in 1941 on the BBC Home Service, Ralph Truman in 1952 on the BBC Home Service, John Hollis in 1970 on BBC Radio 4, and Tim McInnerny in 1994 on BBC Radio 4.
