= Oliver Twist (character) =

Title character of the Charles Dickens novel

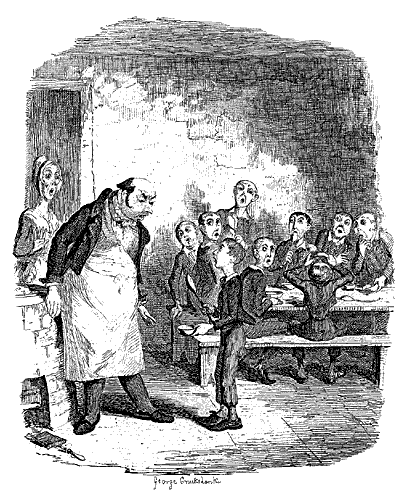
- "Please, sir, I want some more." Illustration by George Cruikshank.
- Created by: Charles Dickens
- Portrayed by: Jackie Coogan (1922); Dickie Moore (1933); John Howard Davies (1948); Bruce Prochnik (1962); Mark Lester (1968); Richard Charles (1982); Ben Rodska (1985); Jon Lee (1994); Tom Fletcher (1994); Steven Webb (1995); Alex Trench (1997); Sam Smith (1999); Joshua Close (2002); George Shields (2003); Justin Pereira (2003-2004); Barney Clark (2005); Joseph McManners (2005); William Miller (2007); Harry Stott; Gwion Jones; Laurence Jeffcoate (2009); Noah McCullough (2010); Leonardo Dickens (2016); Raff Law (2021); Hal Cumpston (2023)
- Voiced by: Gary Marsh (1972); Joey Lawrence (1988)

In-universe information
- Gender: Male
- Title: Mister Oliver Twist
- Family: Agnes Fleming (mother, deceased); Edwin Leeford (father, deceased); Mr Brownlow (adoptive father); Rose Maylie (foster mother); Edward "Monks" Leeford (half-brother, deceased)
- Relatives: Rose Maylie (maternal aunt); Captain Fleming (maternal grandfather, deceased); Mr Brownlow (maternal great-uncle, 1968 film adaptation); Harry Maylie (maternal uncle by marriage); Mrs. Leeford (step-mother, deceased)
- Religion: Anglican
- Nationality: British

Oliver Twist is the titular protagonist of the 1838 novel Oliver Twist by Charles Dickens. He was the first child protagonist in a British novel.

== Background ==
Oliver is an orphan, born in a parish workhouse in an unnamed town. His unmarried mother dies during labour. Old Sally, who was present at the birth, takes from the dying woman a locket and ring. Mr Bumble, the beadle, names the boy Oliver Twist. Oliver is sent to an orphanage, run by Mrs Mann, until he is nine years old, when he is returned to the workhouse.

The orphans at the workhouse are starving because of their cruel treatment. They cast lots to decide who will ask for more gruel for them all, and Oliver is chosen. At evening supper, once the gruel is dished out and eaten, Oliver goes to the master and requests a second helping. He is then branded a troublemaker and offered as an apprentice to anyone willing to take him, and he is eventually apprenticed to Mr. Sowerberry, the undertaker. Sowerberry treats Oliver kindly and also uses him as a mute at pauper funerals. This sparks the jealousy of Noah Claypole, an older boy apprenticed to the undertaker, who constantly bullies Oliver. Eventually, after Claypole cruelly insults Oliver's dead mother, an enraged Oliver fights with, and even gets the better of, the much bigger boy. Oliver is then beaten for the offence, but he manages to escape and runs away to London.

In London, Oliver meets Jack Dawkins, the Artful Dodger, who offers him a place to stay, where he meets up with Fagin and his band of young thieves. Oliver innocently goes "to work" with Dawkins and Charley Bates, but sees the real nature of their "work" when Dawkins picks the pocket of a gentleman. When the gentleman, Mr Brownlow, realises he is being robbed, Oliver is mistaken for the pickpocket and is then chased, captured and taken to the police. Oliver, who was injured in the chase, is cleared by Brownlow, who takes him into his home where he is well treated. After recovering from his injuries, Brownlow sends Oliver on an errand to pay a local merchant £5 and to return some books. However, Oliver is caught by Nancy and Bill Sikes, who pretend to be his siblings, and is returned to Fagin's den. However, Nancy later betrays Fagin and Sikes, as well as herself, for doing so since they have stolen Oliver's chance to have a better life.

Mr Brownlow, who mistakenly thinks that Oliver has run away with the money, assumes that Oliver was a thief all along. This belief is further strengthened when Bumble, in response to Brownlow's newspaper advertisement for information about Oliver, gives a disparaging opinion of the boy. Despite this, Brownlow still holds onto a little bit of hope that this might not be true.

Meanwhile, Oliver is forced by Fagin to join Sikes in an attempted robbery at a rural house, as they need a small boy to enter a window and open the front door for Sikes to get in. However, the robbery fails and, in the ensuing chase, Oliver is shot. He is then nursed back to health at the home of the Maylies, the house Sikes was attempting to burgle. Oliver gives his story to the widow Mrs Maylie, her son Harry and her adoptive daughter Rose, and Doctor Losberne. He also helps out when Rose falls ill, casually meeting a mysterious man along the way.

The mysterious man is Monks, who is revealed to be Oliver's half brother (his true name being Edward Leeford). He joins Fagin in an attempt to recapture Oliver and lead him into a life of crime, so that Oliver's rightful inheritance, of which Oliver knows nothing, would then go to Monks. Nancy, who still feels compassion for Oliver, overhears Fagin's and Monk's plans and tells Rose Maylie, hoping to thwart them. Rose then contacts Brownlow (clearing Oliver's name in the process, much to Brownlow's relief), Dr Losberne and other people, to help her protect Oliver.

Meanwhile, Bumble has married the matron of the workhouse, Mrs Corney. The former Mrs Corney had been in attendance at Old Sally's death, and purloined the locket and ring Old Sally had taken from Oliver's mother Agnes on her deathbed. Monks buys these items from the Bumbles and throws them into the River Thames, hoping that, by destroying them, Oliver's true identity will remain hidden.

Brownlow and Rose Maylie meet Nancy on London Bridge and she tells them how to find Monks. However, Fagin has had Nancy followed and, believing Nancy has revealed his secrets, Fagin tells Sikes that Nancy has betrayed them. Sikes brutally murders Nancy, then flees London to the country. Their neighbours and some of Fagin's own band members soon find out about Nancy's death and, enraged, they tell the police; Sikes falls to his death when he is about to be captured.

Oliver is revealed to be the illegitimate son of a rich man named Edwin Leeford and his young mistress, a girl named Agnes Fleming. Leeford had also fathered another son, Edward ("Monks"), through a failed former marriage. After seducing Agnes, Leeford died, leaving a will which stated that the unborn child would inherit his estate if "in his minority he should never have stained his name with any public act of dishonour, meanness, cowardice, or wrong" in the event of which all would go to Monks. Monks is given half of Oliver's inheritance in cash by Brownlow—who had been Edwin Leeford's best friend and the keeper of his secrets—in the hope that he would start a new life. Monks flees to the United States, where he quickly squanders the money and dies in prison.

Rose Maylie is revealed to be Agnes Fleming's younger sister, who was adopted by the Maylies after her parents died. Therefore, Rose is Oliver's aunt and is able to marry Harry Maylie. Oliver collects his inheritance and is adopted by Brownlow.

== In other media ==
=== Disney adaptations ===
- In Disney's 1988 animated film Oliver & Company, Oliver is portrayed as a ginger orange Tabby kitten who wants a home and lives in New York City instead of London. He joins Fagin's gang of dogs before being taken in and adopted by a wealthy girl named Jenny Foxworth. He is voiced by Joey Lawrence.
- Disney's live-action television film, Oliver Twist was released in 1997. Oliver was played by Alex Trench.
- In October 2016, the studio announced a feature-length live-action musical film adaptation of the story. Ice Cube was set to star as Fagin and would co-write with Jeff Kwatinetz. The two would serve as co-producers, with Marc Platt. Thomas Kail was set to direct.

=== Dickensian ===
In the 2015 TV series, Dickensian, Oliver is a minor character in the last two episodes, first appearing in episode 19, asking Mr Bumble "Please, sir, may I have more," during a meal staged for the overseers of the work house, a ploy of Mr and Mrs Bumble for promotion. Considered impolite and an embarrassment, he is put out onto the streets of London. In the last episode, he is forlorn and destitute on the street, until he meets up with the Artful Dodger and is taken in to Fagin's den of thieves. It is the last scene of the last episode.
