= Mr Brownlow =

Fictional character in Oliver Twist

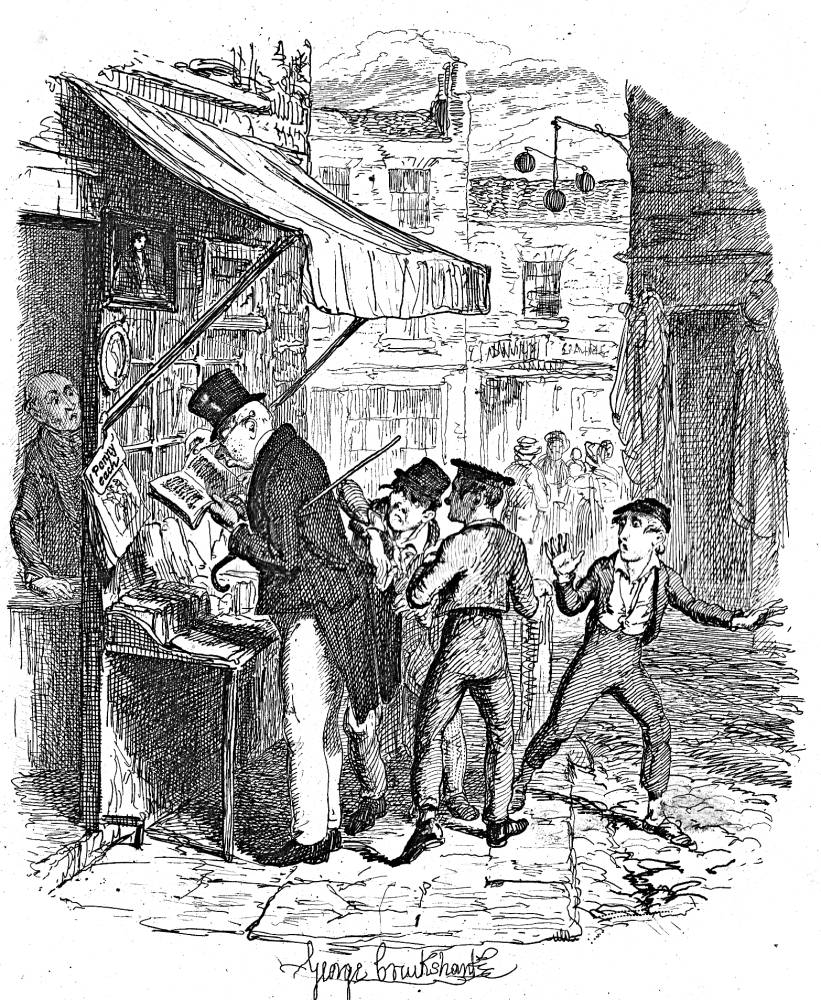
- Oliver is shocked when the Artful Dodger steals Mr Brownlow's handkerchief at the bookstall. Illustration by George Cruikshank.

In-universe information
- Gender: Male
- Family: Oliver Twist (adopted son; great-nephew in 1968 film adaptation)
- Nationality: British

Mr Brownlow is a character from the 1838 novel Oliver Twist by Charles Dickens. Brownlow is a bookish and kindly middle-aged bachelor who helps Oliver escape the clutches of Fagin, and later adopts him.

== The novel ==
Mr Brownlow is introduced when the Artful Dodger and his companion Charley Bates pick his pocket and Oliver Twist is arrested simply for "looking guilty". However, Brownlow soon begins to doubt the boy's guilt because his face resembled that of someone he could not recall. Later, in court, the bookstall keeper proves Oliver's innocence, and after dealing with the extremely agitated magistrate, Mr Fang, Brownlow takes him home, fearing the boy is very ill, which he is. He calls on a doctor, who, after making frequent incorrect guesses about Oliver's condition, simply concludes the boy is recovering from a fever.

Brownlow's housekeeper, Mrs Bedwin, is a kind old lady who immediately takes to Oliver upon his arrival. Brownlow is then struck by Oliver's resemblance to the picture of a beautiful lady on the wall (it turns out to be the picture of Agnes Fleming, Oliver's deceased mother). Later, when Grimwig, an old friend of Brownlow's, evaluates the boy and his condition, a boy arrives from the book shop but fails to take some other books that needed to be returned. Oliver volunteers to return them and takes off, much to the chagrin and doubt of Mr Grimwig, who is revealed to be cynical in nature, expecting the boy to return to his old life among the lower class and promises to "eat his head" should the boy return in 10 minutes. A watch is set down and the waiting begins. Later, after Oliver is captured by Nancy and Bill Sikes, it is revealed that much later, close to midnight, the two men are still waiting in the dark.

The next mention of Brownlow occurs when Mr Bumble rears him after he sees a notice in a newspaper that offers five guineas for any knowledge about Oliver's past or whereabouts; it was a sticky encounter. Mr Bumble at once tells Brownlow that Oliver was born from deplorable lineage and, ever since birth, Oliver has done nothing but display ingratitude and malice. He also mentions Oliver had attacked another boy without provocation and shows Brownlow reports to prove it. Brownlow does not want to believe it at first, but gradually comes to conclusion that Oliver had been playing him for a fool and requests Oliver's name should not be invoked in his household ever again. His housekeeper Mrs Bedwin, however, feels that Oliver was truly a good child and not a criminal.

When Oliver is taken in by the Maylies and asks the kind Dr Losberne to take him to Brownlow's home in London – only to find the house is "FOR LEASE". The only clue to his whereabouts are from his neighbours mentioning the West Indies, saying he was looking for someone.

When Mr Brownlow returns to London, Oliver by chance spots him and can clear his name. Mr Brownlow is very happy about that and takes Oliver in once again, taking part in Nancy's plot to save Oliver from Fagin. At the end of the book, Brownlow officially adopts Oliver as his son.

== Sources ==
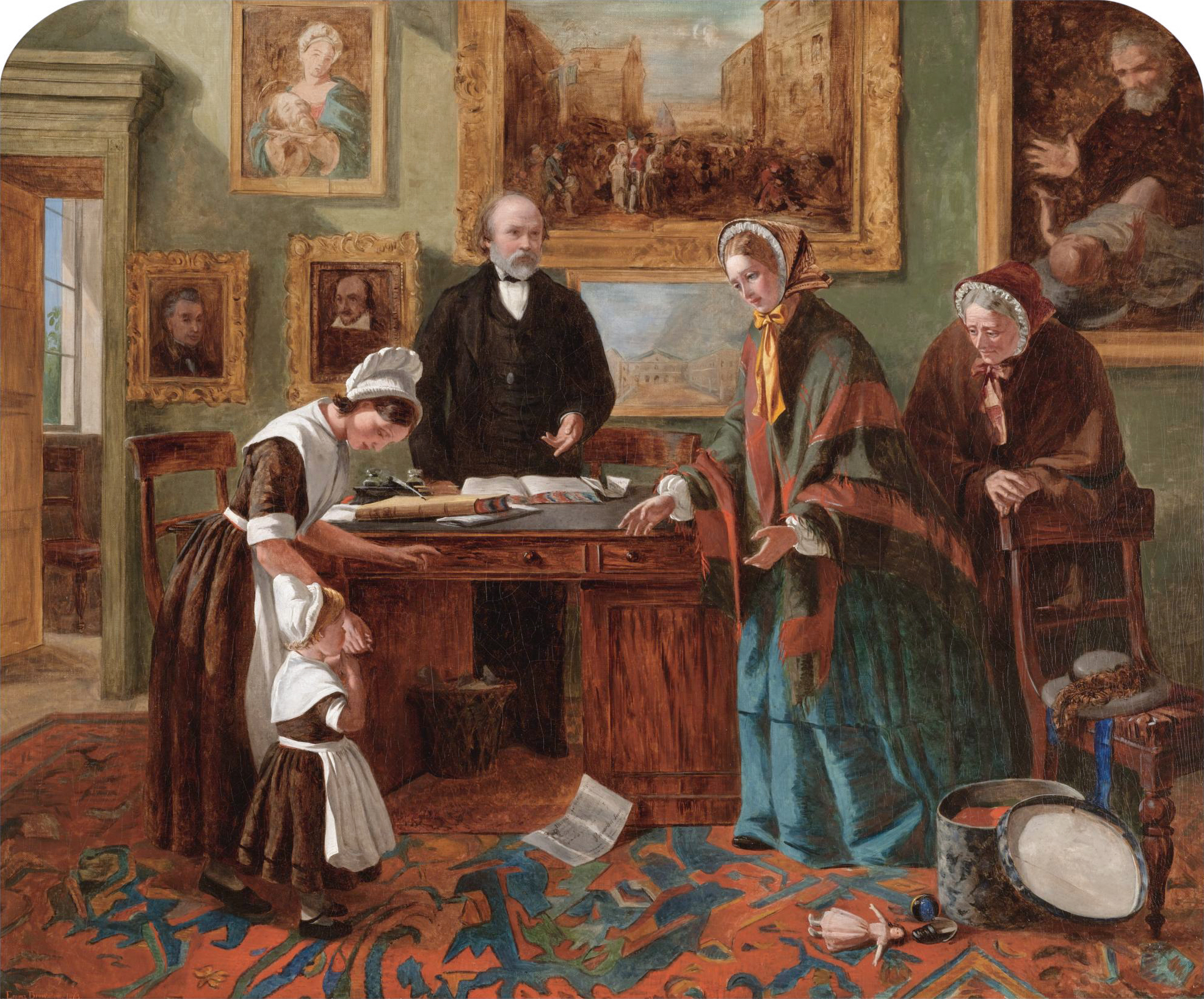
The Foundling Restored to its Mother (1858) by Emma Brownlow, depicting her father John Brownlow (behind desk)

Mr Brownlow's name and character generally believed to be derived from John Brownlow, the director of the Foundling Hospital, which was dedicated to looking after abandoned and unwanted children. Dickens, a regular visitor to the hospital, knew Brownlow well. Dickens scholar Robert Alan Colby argues that "in naming Oliver's benefactor Mr Brownlow, Dickens seems to have been paying a tribute to one of the most dedicated social servants of his age". In 1831, seven years before Dickens wrote Oliver Twist, John Brownlow had written a novel about an orphan called Hans Sloane - a Tale, which has a plot broadly similar to Dickens's later work. Several critics have suggested that Dickens took aspects of the basic plot of his novel from Brownlow's earlier work, so the name may have been a tribute for two reasons.

== Variations ==
Brownlow is presented as Oliver's grandfather in David Lean's 1948 film version of the novel (actor: Henry Stephenson). This is also the case in the stage musical version. In the musical, after retrieving him from London Bridge, where Nancy is murdered while trying to return the boy to Brownlow, it is assumed that Oliver goes to live with him. However, this may vary between productions as in the latest revival, as in the 1968 film Oliver is taken hostage and subsequently saved when Bill is shot during his escape attempt (actor: Joseph O'Conor).

In the film version of Oliver!, Brownlow is made into Oliver's great-uncle, and the boy is saved, not at London Bridge, but from the rooftops of London, where Bill Sikes, who has murdered Nancy and taken Oliver as a hostage, has forced him to crawl out on a wooden hoist in order to loop a rope that Sikes intends to use in his escape. However, Sikes is shot by a police officer below, and Oliver is saved.

In Disney's Oliver & Company, the Mr. Brownlow variant is Jenny Foxworth (voiced by Natalie Gregory), a wealthy Manhattan girl whose character and storyline also draw inspiration from Cosette and Marius Pontmercy of Victor Hugo's Les Misérables. While her parents are away in Europe, she is cared for by her butler Winston and adopts the kitten Oliver. When Oliver disappears, Jenny searches for him alongside her dog Georgette (the film's equivalent to Charlotte, Éponine and Madame Thénardier). After a sympathetic Fagin returns Oliver to her, Jenny is kidnapped by Bill Sykes for ransom, leading to a climatic chase where Fagin, Oliver, and the dogs rescue her.

== Portrayals ==
Actors who have portrayed Mr Brownlow in films and TV:

- Lionel Belmore (1922 film)
- Alec B. Francis (1933 film)
- Henry Stephenson (1948 film)
- George Cruzon (1962, TV serial)
- Joseph O'Conor (1968 musical)
- Michael Hordern (1982, TV film)
- Frank Middlemass (1985, TV serial)
- Anthony Finigan (1997, TV film)
- Michael Kitchen (1999, miniseries)
- Edward Hardwicke (2005 film)
- Edward Fox (2007, miniseries)
