= Oliver! (original Broadway cast recording) =

Oliver!: The Original Broadway Cast Recording

Cast recording by various artists
- Released: 1962
- Recorded: 1962
- Genre: Show tunes
- Label: RCA Victor

Professional ratings
Review scores
Source	Rating
Billboard	(positive)
AllMusic	5/5 stars

Oliver!, subtitled The Original Broadway Cast Recording, is an album containing a recording of the musical Oliver! made my its original 1963 Broadway cast. The album was released prior to the Broadway premiere, on September 1, 1962, by RCA Victor.

== Track listing ==
LP (RCA Victor LSOD 2004)

Side 1
No.	Title	Length
1.	"Food, Glorious Food"	4:00
2.	"Oliver"	1:46
3.	"I Shall Scream"	2:49
4.	"Boy for Sale" / "Where Is Love?"	4:23
5.	"Consider Yourself"	3:47
6.	"You've Got to Pick a Pocket or Two"	3:13
7.	"It's a Fine Life"	3:29
8.	"Be Back Soon"	2:36

Side 2
No.	Title	Length
1.	"Oom-Pah-Pah"	2:42
2.	"My Name"	2:20
3.	"As Long as He Needs Me"	4:07
4.	"Who Will Buy?"	4:20
5.	"Reviewing the Situation"	4:47
6.	"I'll Do Anything"	3:08
7.	"As Long as He Needs Me" (Reprise) / "Reviewing the Situation" (Reprise) / "Finale"	6:00

== Charts ==
Chart (1962)	Peak position
US Billboard Top LPs – 50 Best Selling Stereo LPs	4

== Awards ==
Year	Award type	Categories	Results	Ref.
1963	Grammy Awards	Best Original Cast Show Album	Nominated	
