= Oliver! (soundtrack) =

Soundtrack album by Various
- Released: 1968
- Genre: soundtrack
- Label: Colgems; RCA/BMG

Professional ratings
Review scores
Source	Rating
AllMusic	4/5 stars

Oliver! is the soundtrack to the 1968 British musical drama film of the same name. The soundtrack won an Oscar for Best Original or Adaptation Score at the 41st Academy Awards in 1969. It reached number four in the UK Albums Chart and spent 99 weeks on the chart. In the US, the album spent 91 weeks on Billboard's Top Album chart, reaching number 20 and receiving a Gold record certification.

The soundtrack was included with the 2005 Sony Pictures Home Entertainment issue of the film.

== Track listing ==
All tracks are written by Lionel Bart.

No.	Title	Recording artist(s)	Length
1.	"Overture"	The Orchestra	1:58
2.	"Food, Glorious Food"/"Oliver!"	Mark Lester, Harry Secombe, Peggy Mount & Boys	5:42
3.	"Boy for Sale"	Secombe	2:47
4.	"Where Is Love?"	Lester	3:00
5.	"Pick a Pocket or Two"	Ron Moody & Boys	2:40
6.	"Consider Yourself"	Lester, Jack Wild & Ensemble	5:47
7.	"I'd Do Anything"	Lester, Moody, Shani Wallis, Sheila White, Wild & Boys	3:47
8.	"Be Back Soon"	Moody & Boys	2:49
9.	"As Long as He Needs Me"	Wallis	4:43
10.	"Who Will Buy?"	Lester & Ensemble	6:51
11.	"It's a Fine Life"	Wallis, White & "The Three Cripples" Crowd	3:25
12.	"Reviewing the Situation"	Moody	3:39
13.	"Oom-Pah-Pah"	Wallis & "The Three Cripples" Crowd	2:29
14.	"Finale ("Where is Love?"/"Consider Yourself")"	Ensemble & The Orchestra	1:16

== Personnel ==
Adapted from AllMusic.

- Ensemble – primary artist
- John Green – arranger, conductor, music supervisor
- Mark Lester – guest artist, performer, primary artist
- Kathe Green - dubbing for Mark Lester
- Joe Lopes – engineer
- Ron Moody – guest artist, performer, primary artist
- The Orchestra – performer, primary artist
- Oliver Reed – guest artist, performer
- Harry Secombe – performer, primary artist
- John Snyder – mixing, producer
- Shani Wallis – guest artist, performer, primary artist
- Don Wardell – digital series, executive producer
- Sheila White – performer, primary artist
- Jack Wild – performer, primary artist

== Charts ==
Chart (1969–70)	Peak position
Australia (Kent Music Report)	20
United Kingdom (Official Charts Company)	4
