= I'd Do Anything (Oliver! song) =

Song
- Published: 1960
- Songwriter: Lionel Bart

"I'd Do Anything" is a song performed by various characters in the 1960 British musical Oliver! and the 1968 film of the same name.

== Song ==
The song is part of Act One of Oliver!, and is sung in Fagin's lair. It begins with spoken dialogue between Nancy and the Artful Dodger, soon leading into the song. Other characters who have lines in the song are Oliver, Fagin and Bet (Nancy's younger sister in the musical; her best friend in the 1968 film and in the original novel), with Fagin's Boys as chorus.

== In popular culture ==
In 2007, the BBC announced that a new reality television series I'd Do Anything, named after the song, would begin in 2008 to search for a new, unknown lead to play Nancy and three young performers to play Oliver in a West End revival of Oliver!

In the 2025 film Bridget Jones: Mad About the Boy, Colin Firth's character Mark Darcy sings the song to his son, who later sings it to his school.

== See also ==
- "As Long as He Needs Me"
- "Consider Yourself"
- "Food, Glorious Food"
- "Oliver!" (song)
- "Where Is Love?"
- "You've Got to Pick a Pocket or Two"
