= Oom-Pah-Pah (disambiguation) =

"Oom-Pah-Pah" is a song from the musical Oliver!.

Oom-Pah-Pah may also refer to:

- Oom-pah, rhythmical sounds of brass instruments in a band
- Oumpah-pah, a comic strip
