= Reviewing the Situation =

Reviewing the Situation may refer to:

- Reviewing the Situation (song), a song by Lionel Bart from the musical Oliver!
- Reviewing the Situation (album), an album by Sandie Shaw
