= Be Back Soon =

Song from the musical 'Oliver!'

"Be Back Soon" is a song from the Tony Award-winning British musical Oliver!, and the 1968 Academy Award-winning film Oliver! based on the 1838 novel Oliver Twist by Charles Dickens. The musical was penned by Lionel Bart, and was first shown in London's West End in 1960.

== Background ==
The song is the last in Act I following on immediately after "I'd Do Anything" and is sung in Fagin's thieves' lair by Fagin, the Artful Dodger, Oliver Twist and the boys in Fagin's Gang. In the song Fagin sends the gang of young pickpockets out to 'work' - stealing wallets and pocket handkerchiefs. During the song Fagin sings that he will miss the boys but they are not to return empty-handed. Oliver joins the gang under the care of the Dodger on his first pickpocketing mission. It precedes The Robbery - the last scene in Act I.

The lyrics for this song in the stage musical differ somewhat from those in the 1968 film: in the musical Fagin tells the boys "You can go but bring back plenty of pocket handkerchiefs. And you should be clever thieves. Whip it quick and be back soon. There's a sixpence here for twenty..." while in the film Fagin sings "You can go but bring back plenty of wallets full of cash - don't want to see any trash. Whip 'em quick and be back soon - only thick ones now not empty...". Another lyric change in the song was "Bow Street Runners" to "nosy policemen" in case American audiences didn't understand the reference. Ron Moody later discovered that the eccentric dance step he thought he had improvised for the film version of the song was actually a pas de basque.
