= Oliver! =

1960 English musical by Lionel Bart

- Original theatre programme and poster
- Music: Lionel Bart
- Lyrics: Lionel Bart
- Book: Lionel Bart
- Basis: Oliver Twist by Charles Dickens
- Productions: 1960 West End; 1962 Broadway; 1977 West End revival; 1984 Broadway revival; 1994 West End revival; 2009 West End revival; 2011 UK Tour; 2024 West End revival
- Awards: Tony Award for Best Original Score

Oliver! is a stage musical, with book, music and lyrics by Lionel Bart. The musical is based upon the 1838 novel Oliver Twist by Charles Dickens.

It premiered at the Wimbledon Theatre, southwest London in 1960 before opening in the West End, where it enjoyed a record-breaking long run. Oliver! ran on Broadway, after being brought to the U.S. by producer David Merrick in 1963. Major London revivals played from 1977 to 1980, 1994 to 1998, 2008 to 2011 and on tour in the UK from 2011 to 2013. Additionally, its 1968 film adaptation, directed by Carol Reed, won six Academy Awards including Best Picture.

Oliver! received thousands of performances in British schools, becoming one of the most popular school musicals. In 1963 Lionel Bart received the Tony Award for Best Original Score. Many songs are well known to the public, such as "Food, Glorious Food", "Consider Yourself" and "I'd Do Anything".

== Background ==
Oliver! was the first musical adaptation of a famous Charles Dickens work to become a stage hit. There had been two previous Dickens musicals in the 1950s, both of them television adaptations of A Christmas Carol. The plot of Dickens's original novel is considerably simplified for the purposes of the musical, with Fagin being represented more as a comic character than as a villain, and large portions of the latter part of the story being completely left out. Although Dickens's novel has been called antisemitic in its portrayal of the Jewish Fagin as evil, the production by Bart (himself Jewish) was more sympathetic and featured many Jewish actors in leading roles: Ron Moody (Ronald Moodnick), Georgia Brown (Lilian Klot), and Martin Horsey.

== Synopsis ==
=== Act I ===
The musical opens in the workhouse, as the half-starved orphan boys are entering the enormous dining hall for supper. They are fed only gruel, but find some solace by imagining a richer menu ("Food Glorious Food"). Oliver gathers up the courage to ask for more, and is immediately apprehended by parish beadle Mr. Bumble and the Widow Corney, the heartless and greedy caretakers of the workhouse ("Oliver!"). Mr. Bumble and Widow Corney are left alone, and Mr. Bumble begins to make amorous advances ("I Shall Scream!"). Mrs. Corney pretends to resent his attentions, but ends up on Mr. Bumble's lap, as he eventually proposes to her. Mr. Bumble then takes Oliver and sells him as an apprentice to an undertaker, Mr. Sowerberry ("Boy for Sale"). Mr. Sowerberry and his wife taunt Oliver and Mr. Bumble ("That's Your Funeral"), causing Mr. Bumble to become angry and storm out. Oliver is sent to sleep in the basement with the coffins ("Where Is Love?").

The next morning, Noah Claypole, another employee of Mr. Sowerberry, insults Oliver's dead mother, whereupon Oliver begins pummeling him. Mrs. Sowerberry and her daughter, Charlotte, who is also Noah's girlfriend, run in. The three lock Oliver inside a coffin, and Mr. Bumble is sent for. The entrance of an intoxicated Mr. Sowerberry doesn't aid matters, and during all the commotion Oliver escapes. After a week on the run, he ends up in the city of London and meets a boy about 16 years old known as the Artful Dodger. Dodger seems a kindly boy, and welcomes Oliver to join him and his friends ("Consider Yourself"). Dodger is, unknown to Oliver, a pickpocket, and invites Oliver to come and live in Fagin's lair. Fagin is a veteran criminal "fence" who sends out young boys as pickpockets. Oliver is completely unaware of any criminality and believes that the boys make handkerchiefs rather than steal them. Oliver is introduced to Fagin and his boys and taught their ways ("You've Got to Pick a Pocket or Two").

The next day, Oliver meets Nancy, an older member of Fagin's gang and the girlfriend of Fagin's terrifying associate Bill Sikes, a brutal house-burglar whose abuse she endures because she loves him. Nancy, along with her good friend Bet and the boys sing about how they mostly like their unconventional if dangerous lifestyle ("It's a Fine Life"). Oliver bows deeply to Nancy and Bet, trying to be polite. All the boys laugh and mimic Oliver. Nancy singles out Dodger to demonstrate the way the rich people treat each other ("I'd Do Anything"). Nancy and Bet leave, and Oliver is sent out with the other boys on his first pickpocketing job ("Be Back Soon"). Fagin tells Oliver to go with Dodger and another boy named Charley Bates, but when Dodger and Charley steal a handkerchief from Mr. Brownlow, a wealthy old man, they run off, leaving the horrified Oliver to be arrested for the crime ("The Robbery").

=== Act II ===
The Broadway version of Oliver! at the Imperial Theatre

In the Three Cripples pub, at the request of boisterous customers, Nancy strikes up an old tavern song with the low-life ruffians, ("Oom-Pah-Pah"). Bill Sikes makes his first appearance and disperses the crowd ("My Name"). Dodger runs in and tells Fagin about Oliver's capture and removal to the Brownlow household. Worried that Oliver will "blow upon them" (i.e. betray the gang to the authorities), Fagin and Bill decide to abduct Oliver and bring him back to the den, with Nancy's help. Nancy, who has come to care for Oliver, at first refuses to help, but Bill physically abuses her and forces her into obedience. In spite of this, Nancy still loves Bill and believes he loves her too ("As Long as He Needs Me").

The next morning, at Mr. Brownlow's house in Bloomsbury, Mrs. Bedwin, the housekeeper, sings to Oliver ("Where Is Love?" (reprise)), and Oliver wakes up as street-sellers begin their day's work outside ("Who Will Buy?"). Mr. Brownlow and Dr. Grimwig decide that Oliver is well enough to go outside, so Brownlow sends Oliver to return some books to the bookseller. Oliver sees a group of street vendors and joins them in song ("Who Will Buy?" (reprise)). As the vendors leave, Nancy and Bill appear and grab Oliver. They bring him back to Fagin's den, where Nancy saves Oliver from a beating from Sikes after the boy tries to flee. Nancy remorsefully reviews their dreadful life, but Bill maintains that any living is better than none while Fagin tries to smooth things over ("It's A Fine Life" (reprise)). Left alone, Fagin ponders his current existence and possible life changes ("Reviewing the Situation"); however, after thinking of various excuses, he elects to stay just as he is.

Back at the workhouse, Mr. Bumble and the Widow Corney, now unhappily married, are told by the dying pauper Old Sally that Oliver's mother, Agnes, left a gold locket when she died in childbirth. Old Sally had stolen the locket, which she gives to the Widow Corney before she dies. Mr. and Mrs. Bumble realize that Oliver may have wealthy relatives ("Oliver!" (reprise)) and visit Mr. Brownlow (who has advertised for news of Oliver), hoping to profit from any reward given for information. Mr. Brownlow realizes they are not interested in Oliver's welfare but only money and throws them out. Recognizing the picture inside the locket as a picture of his daughter, he realizes that Oliver is actually his grandson.

Nancy visits Mr. Brownlow, explains how she and Bill abducted Oliver, and remorsefully promises to deliver Oliver to him safely that night on London Bridge but refuses to give up her fellow gang members. She ponders again about Bill ("As Long as He Needs Me" (reprise)). Suspecting Nancy, Bill follows her as she sneaks Oliver out of Fagin's den. At London Bridge, he confronts them and viciously clubs Nancy to death. He then grabs Oliver and runs off. Mr. Brownlow arrives and discovers Nancy's body. A large crowd forms, among them the distraught Bet. Bullseye, Bill's terrier, turns on his master and returns to the scene of the crime, and the crowd prepares to follow him. After Sikes brings Oliver to Fagin's hideout looking for aid, Fagin and his boys flee in panic. The constables break in, and Dodger is arrested before he can escape. Not finding Bill at the hideout, the crowd returns to the Thames Embankment. Bill appears at the top of the bridge, holding Oliver as hostage and threatening to kill him. When a memory of the dead Nancy freezes Sikes, two policemen sneak up on him, and one of them shoots Bill while the other grabs Oliver. After Oliver is reunited with Mr. Brownlow, the mob disperses. Fagin appears and decides that the time has never looked better for him to straighten out his life ("Reviewing the Situation" (reprise)).

== Musical numbers ==
Act I

- "Food, Glorious Food" – Workhouse Boys
- "Oliver!" – Mr Bumble, Widow Corney, Boys and Governors
- "I Shall Scream" – Mr Bumble and Widow Corney
- "Boy for Sale" – Mr Bumble
- "That's Your Funeral" – Mr Sowerberry, Mrs Sowerberry, and Mr Bumble
- "Where Is Love?" – Oliver
- "Consider Yourself" – The Artful Dodger, Oliver, and Chorus
- "You've Got to Pick a Pocket or Two" – Fagin and Fagin's Gang
- "It's a Fine Life" – Nancy, Bet, and Fagin's Gang
- "I'd Do Anything" – The Artful Dodger, Nancy, Oliver, Bet, Fagin, and Fagin's Gang
- "Be Back Soon" – Fagin, The Artful Dodger, Oliver and Fagin's Gang

Act II

- "Oom-Pah-Pah" – Nancy and Chorus
- "My Name" – Bill Sikes
- "As Long as He Needs Me" – Nancy
- "Where Is Love?" (reprise) #– Mrs Bedwin
- "Who Will Buy?" – Oliver, Vendors, and Chorus
- "It's a Fine Life" (reprise) #– Bill Sikes, Nancy, Fagin, and The Artful Dodger
- "Reviewing the Situation" – Fagin
- "Oliver!" (reprise) – Mr Bumble and Widow Corney
- "As Long as He Needs Me" (reprise) – Nancy
- "Reviewing the Situation" (reprise) – Fagin
- Finale ("Food, Glorious Food", "Consider Yourself" and "I'd Do Anything") – Company

(# indicates songs not on the original London recording. The Broadway recording drops "That's Your Funeral" and the Act II reprise of "Oliver!". The 1994 and 2009 London recordings include the Coffin Music, The Robbery, the reprises of "Where is Love" and "It's a Fine Life" and the London Bridge scene.)

== Production history ==
=== Original London production ===
Oliver! premiered at the Wimbledon Theatre for a preliminary engagement before opening at the New Theatre (now the Noël Coward Theatre, formerly the Albery) on 30 June 1960 and ran for 2,618 performances, a record for a musical in London at the time. Directed by Peter Coe, the choreographer was Malcolm Clare and costumes and scenery were by Sean Kenny. The original cast featured Ron Moody as Fagin, Georgia Brown as Nancy, and Barry Humphries in the supporting role of Mr. Sowerberry, the undertaker. Keith Hamshere (the original Oliver) is now a Hollywood still photographer; Martin Horsey (the original Artful Dodger) worked as an actor/director and authored the play L'Chaim. Other boys who alternated in the juvenile leads included Phil Collins, Leonard Whiting and future Monkee Davy Jones as the Artful Dodger. The cast also included Tony Robinson as one of the Workhouse boys/Fagin's Gang, and John Bluthal as Fagin. Former professional boxer Danny Sewell was the original Bill Sikes and remained in the role (including the original Broadway and US touring productions) for almost six years. Steve Marriott played workhouse boys including The Artful Dodger, and he is featured on the original soundtrack LP. Michael Cashman played the role of Oliver during his time in the production.

Sid James turned down the part of Fagin as the timing of the production coincided with his own attempts to move away from the shady and roguish roles for which he was well known.

=== Original Broadway production ===
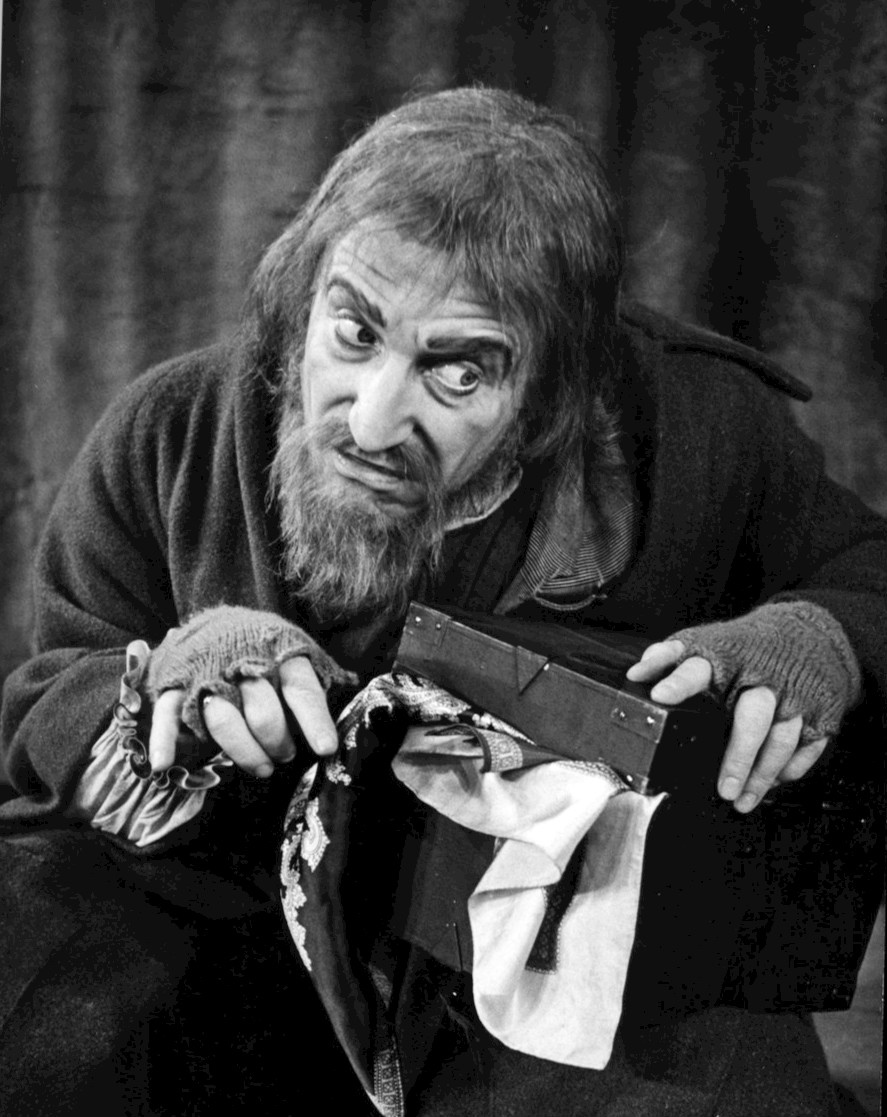
Clive Revill as Fagin in the Broadway production of Oliver!

David Merrick brought Oliver! to the Broadway stage, where it premiered at the Imperial Theatre on 6 January 1963. It closed on 14 November 1964, after 774 performances. The cast featured Bruce Prochnik in the title role alongside Georgia Brown, Danny Sewell and Barry Humphries, reprising their West End roles as Nancy, Bill Sikes and Mr. Sowerberry, respectively, and Clive Revill as Fagin. The national tour and cast recording featured Michael Goodman as The Artful Dodger, but on Broadway the role was played by Davy Jones, another veteran of the London production. The Broadway production was a critical success and received ten Tony Award nominations, including Best Musical, Best Actor in a Musical, Best Actress in a Musical and Best Featured Actor in a Musical. It won the awards for Best Scenic Design, Best Original Score and Best Music Direction. The Broadway production was revived shortly after the original production closed. The revival opened in 1965 and was directed by Peter Coe. It ran at the Martin Beck Theatre for 64 performances, featuring Victor Stiles as Oliver, Robin Ramsay as Fagin, Maura K. Wedge as Nancy, Joey Baio as The Artful Dodger, Dominic Chianese as Mr. Sowerberry, Alan Crofoot as Mr. Bumble, Sewell as Bill Sikes, Bram Nossen as Mr. Brownlow, and Dodi Protero as Mrs. Bedwin. The cast recording was done in Los Angeles in advance of its New York opening.

Brown, Jones, Ramsay, Ronnie Kroll and Joan Lombardo performed two musical numbers from Oliver! ("I'd Do Anything" and the Act II reprise of "As Long as He Needs Me") on The Ed Sullivan Show on the evening of 9 February 1964, the same evening that the Beatles made their first U.S. television appearance on that show.

=== 1967 and 1977 West End revivals ===
A revival opened in April 1967 at the Piccadilly Theatre, starring Paul Bartlett as the title character and Barry Humphries as Fagin, with Marti Webb as Nancy, running for 331 performances. It was directed by David Phethean, produced by Donald Albery, with sets by Sean Kenny.

Cameron Mackintosh produced a revival opening on 21 December 1977 at the Albery Theatre (the renamed New Theatre; now the Noël Coward Theatre), starring Roy Hudd as Fagin (later replaced by Roy Dotrice and then George Layton,) that ran until 20 September 1980, following a UK tour mounted at the Haymarket Theatre, Leicester from 16 July 1977. This production was faithful to the 1960 original version, using Sean Kenny's set.

=== 1983 West End and Broadway revivals ===
Mackintosh was asked to revive the show yet again in 1983 for a limited five-week Christmas season at the Aldwych Theatre, directed by Peter Coe. Ron Moody returned as Fagin, with Jackie Marks as Nancy, Linal Haft as Bill Sikes, Meg Johnson as Mrs Corney, Peter Bayliss as Mr. Bumble, and Geoffrey Toone as Mr Brownlow. Oliver was played by Anthony Pearson and the Artful Dodger by David Garlick. The original Sean Kenny sets were used. The last professional production to use Sean Kenny's original stage design was at the Queen's Theatre, Hornchurch, Essex, in 1986. This production starred Victor Spinetti as Fagin.

The production transferred to Broadway in 1984. It opened at the Mark Hellinger Theatre and ran from 29 April 1984 through 13 May 1984, for 17 performances and 13 previews. Moody reprised the role of Fagin and Patti LuPone played Nancy. David Garlick reprised his West End performance as The Artful Dodger, the first British youngster to appear on Broadway since Davy Jones, creating the Equity Exchange Program in the process. The original creative staff were used for this production, including director Peter Coe. For this production, the song "I Shall Scream" was eliminated. LuPone, in her memoirs, said that the production should have run longer, noting that this production utilized the original sets, costumes, blocking (staging), and direction, and commented: "Hmm...maybe 'that' was the problem". Moody was nominated for a Tony Award despite the short run. The show only received one negative review; it was from Frank Rich of The New York Times who called the production "likely to hold the attention of only the youngest and most obedient children" and "just dull". It prompted one of the main backers to pull out. The positive reviews were quoted in the ad for the show, including a Clive Barnes quote: "Oliver! is glorious food for Broadway". LuPone had asked the show's Musical Director to change her keys because they were too low for her, but was told she could not. She wrote that she "had major battles with the musical director", one concerning the term "vamp"; "he never waited for me to finish my dialogue."

=== 1994 West End revival ===
Cameron Mackintosh produced another revival of the show which opened at the London Palladium in the West End on 8 December 1994. The production team included a young Sam Mendes as director, with Anthony Ward as designer, Matthew Bourne as choreographer, Martin Koch as music supervisor and William David Brohn as orchestrator. The cast included Jonathan Pryce (after much persuasion) as Fagin, Sally Dexter as Nancy, Miles Anderson as Bill Sikes, James Villiers as Mr. Brownlow, James Saxon as Mr. Bumble, Jenny Galloway as Widow Corney, David Delve as Mr. Sowerberry and Julia Deakin as Mrs. Sowerberry. The role of Oliver was played by numerous child actors during the run of four years, including Gregory Bradley, Ben Reynolds, Jon Lee, Steven Webb, James Bourne, Simon Schofield, James Rowntree and Tom Fletcher, while the Artful Dodger was played by Adam Searles and others including Matt Johnson, Paul Bailey and Bronson Webb. The role of Bet was played by Danielle McCormack, Rosalind James, Francesca Jackson and Lindsey Fawcett. The role of Fagin was later played by many notable British actors and comedians including George Layton, Russ Abbot, Jim Dale and Robert Lindsay (who won an Olivier Award for his performance in 1997). Bill Sikes was later portrayed by Steven Hartley and Joe McGann, and Nancy by Sonia Swaby, Claire Moore and Ruthie Henshall. The musical closed on 21 February 1998.

==== 1998 UK tour ====
Following the Palladium production, a UK tour produced by Mackintosh (in co-production with Theatre Royal, Plymouth) began in 1998 starring Gary Wilmot as Fagin, Sonia Swaby as Nancy and David Birrell as Bill Sikes.

=== 2008 West End revival ===
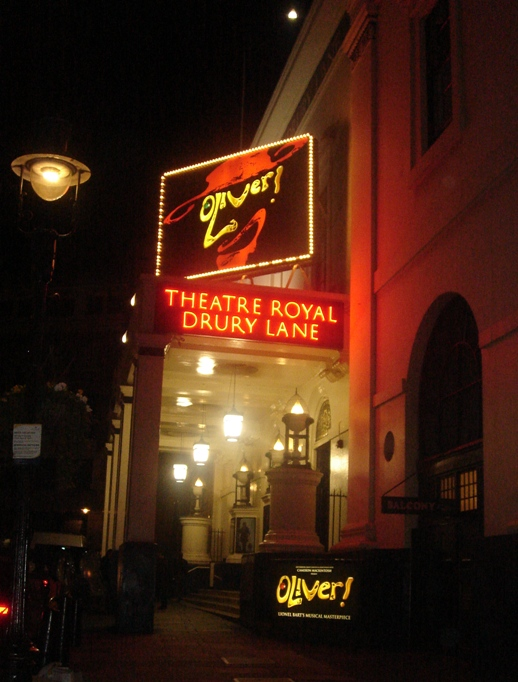
Oliver! bill board at the Theatre Royal, Drury Lane in 2009.

A production heavily based upon the 1994 Palladium production began previews at the Theatre Royal, Drury Lane on 12 December 2008 and opened on 14 January 2009. Produced again by Mackintosh, this revival was directed by Shakespeare expert Rupert Goold and choreographed/co-directed by Matthew Bourne. Anthony Ward repeated his scenic and costume designs, with a new cobblestone effect, while William David Brohn returned as orchestrator with some new arrangements. The prologue from the Palladium production was removed, and the show opened as it originally did in 1960, with the workhouse children singing "Food, Glorious Food".

Rowan Atkinson played Fagin, with Burn Gorman as Bill Sikes. Sharing the role of Oliver were Harry Stott, Laurence Jeffcoate and Gwion Wyn Jones. Rob Madge, Ross McCormack, Eric Dibb Fuller and Jack Glister shared The Artful Dodger. Jodie Prenger shared the part of Nancy with Tamsin Carroll, who played two performances each week. Julian Glover played Mr. Brownlow with Julian Bleach as Mr. Sowerberry/Dr. Grimwig, Louise Gold as Mrs. Sowerberry, Julius D'Silva as Mr. Bumble and Wendy Ferguson as Widow Corney. The revival was nominated for three 2010 Olivier Awards: Best Revival of a Musical, Best Actor in a Musical (Atkinson) and Best Theatre Choreography, but failed to win any. Atkinson fell ill in April 2009, and Abbot reprised the role temporarily. Later replacements were Omid Djalili followed by Griff Rhys Jones as Fagin and Steven Hartley as Bill. Kerry Ellis was a replacement as Nancy. Ron Moody, the original Fagin, joined the cast on 30 June 2010 to celebrate the show's 50th Anniversary. The production closed on 8 January 2011.

==== 2011–13 UK and Ireland tour ====
After the 2009 revival closed in January 2011, Mackintosh announced that a new production based on the Drury Lane production, with a new set and direction by Laurence Connor, would embark on a 13-month UK and Ireland tour beginning at the Wales Millennium Centre, Cardiff in December 2011 and ending February 2013 at the Bristol Hippodrome. The tour starred Neil Morrissey and Brian Conley sharing the role of Fagin and Samantha Barks (who came third in the BBC reality show I'd Do Anything, which was won by Prenger) as Nancy before sharing the role with Cat Simmons.

=== 2023 Encores! ===
New York City Center staged Oliver as a part of its Encores! series. The cast featured Lilli Cooper (Nancy), Raúl Esparza (Fagin), Julian Lerner (The Artful Dodger), Tam Mutu (Bill Sikes), Brad Oscar (Mr. Bumble), Benjamin Pajak (Oliver), Michael Siberry (Mr. Brownlow), and Mary Testa (Widow Corney), with direction by Lear deBessonet. The production ran from May 3 to 14, 2023. Gavin Lee was the standby for Fagin but went on several times during the run.

=== 2024 West End revival ===
A production presented by Cameron Mackintosh at the Gielgud Theatre in the West End began previews on 14 December 2024 with an opening night on 14 January 2025, following a season at Chichester Festival Theatre from 8 July to 7 September 2024. It is revised by Mackintosh and directed and choreographed by Matthew Bourne, designed by Lez Brotherston with a cast including Simon Lipkin as Fagin, Shanay Holmes as Nancy, Aaron Sidwell as Bill Sikes, Billy Jenkins as the Artful Dodger, and Philip Franks as Mr. Brownlow. It received positive reviews and is expected to run until at least March 2027. Notable replacements have included Ava Brennan as Nancy and Matt Lucas as Fagin.

=== UK regional productions ===
A revival directed by Daniel Evans opened for the 2013–2014 festive season at the Crucible Theatre, Sheffield with Tom Edden as Fagin. An actor-musician production opened at the Watermill Theatre, Newbury directed by Luke Sheppard, with a cast including Cameron Blakely as Fagin and Alice Fearn as Nancy, and ran from July to September 2015. A revival at Curve, Leicester for the following festive season starred Peter Polycarpou as Fagin, with Cat Simmons and Laura Pitt-Pulford as Nancy, directed by Paul Kerryson. A production played at the Leeds Playhouse over the 2021–2024 festive season, directed by James Brining with a cast including Steve Furst as Fagin and Jenny Fitzpatrick as Nancy.

=== International productions ===
In 1968, Oliver was taken to Japan for 3 months with Sean Kenny's original set, by the Japanese film company Toho Productions. "Consider Yourself" was translated into Japanese for the final Curtain Calls. Directed by Geoff Ferris who had worked on the UK production in 1967. Australian actor Robin Ramsay played Fagin. Most of the cast were British along with two original British boys, Ray Millross who played the Artful Dodger and Terry Latham who played Charlie Bates. Ray Millross had played one of the boys and Oliver in the original production at the then New Theatre in London and also shared the role of the Artful Dodger at the Piccadilly Theatre in London in 1967 before transferring to the Imperial Theatre in Tokyo, Japan in 1968 for 4 months. The rest of the workhouse boys and Fagin's gang were American including Robbie Benson, now a well known American Actor and Linda Purl who shared the role of Bet, also now a well known American Actor and Singer.

Vincent Price starred as Fagin in a 1974 summer stock production in Columbus, Ohio and again in 1976 in a regional tour that included The Music Hall at Fair Park in Dallas, Texas and the St. Louis Municipal Opera Theatre (see "1976 [Season 58] - The Regular Season" of List of The Muny repertory).

In 1983, a new production of Oliver was the first musical produced by Philadelphia's Walnut Street Theatre as part of its inaugural season as a self-producing theatre.

The Australian tour was a successful trip through Sydney, Melbourne, and Singapore from 2002 to 2004. The show, which mirrored Sam Mendes's production, was recreated by Graham Gill. John Waters played Fagin, Tamsin Carroll was Nancy, and the production also featured Stuart Wagstaff, Steve Bastoni and Madison Orr and Keegan Joyce in the title role, which was rotated between the two. The role of the Artful Dodger was shared between Mathew Waters and Tim Matthews, with Waters performing on the opening night. Waters declined the tour after the Sydney production to appear in the Hollywood movie Peter Pan.

A North American tour began in 2003, produced by Cameron Mackintosh and Networks. It ran till March 2005 and played most major theatrical venues in the U.S. and one in Canada. The show was directed by the London team which managed the Sam Mendes version in London and the Australian tour, with Graham Gill as director. The cast included Mark McCracken as Fagin, Renata Renee Wilson as Nancy and Justin S. Pereira as Oliver. In October 2008 Columbia Artists Theatricals mounted a new North American National tour directed by Clayton Philips. The production toured until March 2009.

The first Estonian production of the show was presented in the early 1990s in Tartu. A revival ran in November–December 2003 with Aivar Tommingas as Fagin and Evelin Samuel as Nancy. The musical was performed also twice in Israel in 1966 and 2008 starring Shraga Fridman and Rivka Raz in the first production and Sasson Gabai and Ania Bukshtein in the second. In December 2010 a Dutch language version of the musical opened in Gent, Belgium, to be transferred at the end of the same month to Antwerp. In 2011 a Syrian production is to be performed at the Damascus Opera. In 2012 a new production was staged by Popular Productions in Dubai, UAE (First Group Theatre). It starred Philip Cox as Fagin and Lucy Hunter-James as Nancy.

== Film adaptations ==
In 1968, the show was adapted for film, with a screenplay by Vernon Harris and direction by Carol Reed. It starred original Fagin Ron Moody with Jack Wild, Shani Wallis, Oliver Reed, Mark Lester, Harry Secombe and Leonard Rossiter. The 1968 motion picture won six Academy Awards including Best Picture, and received nominations for both Moody and Wild. It was first telecast in the United States by ABC-TV in 1975. The film went to cable in the US in 1982, and it is still regularly broadcast.

On 1 March 2013, a planned remake of Oliver! was announced. It was originally aiming for a 2016 release. Cameron Mackintosh, the producer of the film version of the musical Les Misérables was announced as producer, and potential talent included Les Misérables' Samantha Barks, who played Nancy on the 2011-2013 UK Tour, repeating her part and Stephen Daldry as the director.

== Recordings ==
The score of Oliver! has been recorded numerous times. There are cast recordings (on compact disc) available for the original London and Broadway productions as well as for the 1968 film and the 1994 and 2009 London revivals. The 2009 London cast album was recorded live on opening night.

There are several studio cast recordings of the show including with Stanley Holloway as Fagin and Alma Cogan as Nancy (Capitol Records ST 1784, 1962), Jon Pertwee as Fagin and Jim Dale as The Artful Dodger (Music for Pleasure MFP 1073, 1966), with Ian Carmichael as Fagin and Joyce Blair as Nancy (World Record Club S-7036, 1963) and with Josephine Barstow as Nancy, Sheila Hancock as Mrs. Corney and Julian Forsyth as Fagin (That's Entertainment Records/TER MUS C NO3, 1994; a new version was released in 2009 with Sally Ann Triplett replacing Barstow).

== Cast and characters ==
The following table gives the principal casting information for the major-market productions of Oliver!.

Character	West End	Broadway	Broadway Revival	West End Revival	West End Revival	West End Revival	Broadway Revival	West End Revival	West End Revival	West End Revival
Character	1960	1963	1965	1967	1977	1983	1984	1994	2008	2024
Fagin	Ron Moody	Clive Revill	Robin Ramsay	Barry Humphries Robin Ramsay	Roy Hudd	Ron Moody	Ron Moody	Jonathan Pryce	Rowan Atkinson	Simon Lipkin
Nancy	Georgia Brown	Georgia Brown	Maura K. Wedge	Marti Webb	Gillian Burns	Jackie Marks	Patti LuPone	Sally Dexter	Jodie Prenger	Shanay Holmes
Bill Sikes	Danny Sewell	Danny Sewell	Danny Sewell	Danny Sewell	Michael Attwell	Linal Haft	Graeme Campbell	Miles Anderson	Burn Gorman	Aaron Sidwell
Oliver Twist	Keith Hamshere	Bruce Prochnik	Victor Stiles	Paul Bartlett Freddie Foot Steven Newman	Harvey Hillyer	Anthony Pearson	Braden Danner	James Daley Gregory Bradley	Tom Rogers Gwion Wyn Jones Laurence Jeffcoate Harry Stott	Cian Eagle-Service Raphael Korniets Jack Philipott Odo Rowntree-Bailly
The Artful Dodger	Martin Horsey	David Jones	George Priolo	Leslie Stone Ray Millross Stephen Leigh	John Savage Stephen Kebell	David Garlick	David Garlick	Adam Searles Paul Bailey	Ethan Williams Jack Glister Ross McCormack Eric Dibb Fuller Robert Madge	Billy Jenkins
Mr. Bumble	Paul Whitsun-Jones	Willoughby Goddard	Alan Crofoot	Tom De Ville	Robert Bridges	Peter Bayliss	Michael McCarty	James Saxon	Julius D'Silva	Oscar Conlon-Morrey
Widow Corney	Hope Jackman	Hope Jackman	Dawna Shove	Pamela Pitchford	Joan Turner	Meg Johnson	Elizabeth Larner	Jenny Galloway	Wendy Ferguson	Katy Secombe
Mr. Sowerberry	Barry Humphries	Barry Humphries	John Miranda	Glyn Worsnip	Graham Hamilton	Richard Frost	Roderick Horn	David Delve	Julian Bleach	Stephen Matthews
Mrs. Sowerberry	Sonia Fraser	Helena Carroll	Sherill Price	Edna Doré	Jill Fletcher	Liz Moscrop	Frances Cuka	Julia Deakin	Louise Gold	Jamie Birkett
Mr. Brownlow	George Bishop	Geoffrey Lumb	Bram Nossen	Gavin Gordon	Jack Allen	Geoffrey Toone	Michael Allinson	James Villiers	Julian Glover	Philip Franks

=== Notable replacements ===
==== West End (1977) ====
- Fagin: Roy Dotrice, George Layton

==== West End (1994–1998) ====
- Fagin: George Layton, Russ Abbot, Jim Dale, Robert Lindsay, Barry Humphries
- Nancy: Claire Moore, Ruthie Henshall
- Bill Sikes: Steven Hartley, Joe McGann

==== West End (2009–2011) ====
- Fagin: Omid Djalili, Griff Rhys Jones, Russ Abbot
- Nancy: Kerry Ellis
- Bill Sikes: Steven Hartley

==== West End (2024–present) ====
- Fagin: Matt Lucas
- Nancy: Ava Brennan

== Awards and nominations ==
=== Original Broadway production ===
Year	Award	Category	Nominee	Result
1963	Tony Award	Best Musical		Nominated
1963	Tony Award	Best Performance by a Leading Actor in a Musical	Clive Revill	Nominated
1963	Tony Award	Best Performance by a Leading Actress in a Musical	Georgia Brown	Nominated
1963	Tony Award	Best Performance by a Featured Actor in a Musical	David Jones	Nominated
1963	Tony Award	Best Author of a Musical	Lionel Bart	Nominated
1963	Tony Award	Best Original Score	Lionel Bart	Won
1963	Tony Award	Best Producer of a Musical	David Merrick and Donald Albery	Nominated
1963	Tony Award	Best Direction of a Musical	Peter Coe	Nominated
1963	Tony Award	Best Conductor and Musical Director	Don Pippin	Won
1963	Tony Award	Best Scenic Design	Sean Kenny	Won

=== 1984 Broadway revival ===
Year	Award	Category	Nominee	Result
1984	Tony Award	Best Performance by a Leading Actor in a Musical	Ron Moody	Nominated

=== 1994 West End revival ===
Year	Award	Category	Nominee	Result
1995	Laurence Olivier Awards	Best Musical Revival		Nominated
1995	Laurence Olivier Awards	Best Director	Sam Mendes	Nominated
1995	Laurence Olivier Awards	Best Actor in a Musical	Jonathan Pryce	Nominated
1995	Laurence Olivier Awards	Best Actress in a Musical	Sally Dexter	Nominated
1997	Laurence Olivier Awards	Best Actor in a Musical	Robert Lindsay	Won

=== 2009 West End revival ===
Year	Award	Category	Nominee	Result
2010	Laurence Olivier Awards	Best Musical Revival		Nominated
2010	Laurence Olivier Awards	Best Actor in a Musical	Rowan Atkinson	Nominated
2010	Laurence Olivier Awards	Best Theatre Choreographer	Matthew Bourne	Nominated
2010	WhatsOnStage Awards	Best Musical Revival		Won
2010	WhatsOnStage Awards	Best Actor in a Musical	Rowan Atkinson	Won
2010	WhatsOnStage Awards	Best Supporting Actor in a Musical	Burn Gorman	Nominated
2010	WhatsOnStage Awards	Best Supporting Actress in a Musical	Jodie Prenger	Won
2010	WhatsOnStage Awards	Best Takeover in a Role	Omid Djalili	Nominated

=== 2024 West End Revival ===
Year	Award	Category	Nominee	Result
2025	WhatsOnStage Awards	Best Musical Revival		Nominated
2025	WhatsOnStage Awards	Best Regional Production		Won
2025	WhatsOnStage Awards	Best Choreography	Matthew Bourne	Nominated
2025	WhatsOnStage Awards	Best Costume Design	Lez Brotherston	Nominated
2025	WhatsOnStage Awards	Best Lighting Design	Paule Constable	Nominated
2025	Laurence Olivier Awards	Best Musical Revival		Nominated
2025	Laurence Olivier Awards	Best Actor in a Musical	Simon Lipkin	Nominated
2025	Laurence Olivier Awards	Best Theatre Choreographer	Matthew Bourne	Nominated
2025	Laurence Olivier Awards	Best Lighting Design	Paule Constable & Ben Jacobs	Won

Oliver! was one of eight UK musicals featured on Royal Mail stamps, issued in February 2011.

== Sequel ==
Dodger!, a sequel to Lionel Bart's Oliver! was composed by Andrew Fletcher with the book and lyrics written by David Lambert. It is set seven years after the events in the novel Oliver Twist by Charles Dickens where the Artful Dodger has been sentenced to an Australian penal colony and has a romantic involvement with the character Bet.

== Ownership ==
When Lionel Bart faced severe financial difficulties several years later, he sold his past and future rights to Oliver! to the entertainer Max Bygraves for £350. Bygraves later sold them on for £250,000.

== See also ==
- August Rush
- Becoming Nancy, a 2011 novel by Terry Ronald about a boy being cast as Nancy in his school production of Oliver! Also adapted into a stage musical in 2019.
