= Ava Brennan =

English film and theatre actress (born 1987)

Ava Brennan (born 7 January 1987) is an English film and theatre actress from Liverpool, Merseyside, England. She is best known for her portrayal of Nala in the musical The Lion King in the West End and in Hamburg.

== Biography ==
Brennan grew up in Liverpool and attended Belvedere girls’ school. She trained at the Loretta Legge Theatre School in Maghull, where she learned ballet, modern dance and tap dance, and later joined the National Youth Music Theatre, appearing on stage in London aged 15 in Oklahoma!.

=== Theatre ===
Ava Brennan's theatre credits include Nala in The Lion King (West End), Luisa Vampa in The Count of Monte Cristo, Mercedes in Miami Nights, Dynamite in Hairspray, Cover Aida in Aida, and Ikette in Tina (musical), as well as appearances in Aladdin and Oklahoma!. Brennan also played the female lead Angelica in Lin Manuel Miranda’s Hamilton in London’s West End, and she appeared as Fantine in Boublil and Schönberg’s Les Misérables at London’s Sondheim Theatre.

In 2023 Brennan was cast in a leading role in the new musical stage adaptation of The Secret Life of Bees based on the best-selling novel by Sue Monk Kidd at the Almeida Theatre in North London.

In April 2025 she was cast in Oliver! as alternate Nancy at London's Gielgud Theatre. In September 2025 she took over the role full time

=== Film ===
Ava Brennan has appeared in the following movies: Beauty and the Beast, Mamma Mia: Here We Go Again!, Hellboy and Rocket Man. She also performed as a singer in the famous TV production West Side Stories: The Making of a Classic and Blue Peter. Brennan plays series regular Vee in season 4 of Top Boy for Netflix.

| Year | Title | Role | Notes |
|---|---|---|---|
| 2014 | Teenage Ghost Punk | Dancing Ghost | |
| 2017 | Beauty and the Beast | Debutante | |
| 2018 | Mamma Mia: Here We Go Again! | Performer | |
| 2019 | Hellboy | Alice's Mother | |
| 2019 | Rocketman | Dancer | |
| 2022 | Top Boy | Vee | TV Series (5 episodes) |
