= Mr Sowerberry =

Fictional character in a novel Oliver Twist By Charles Dickens

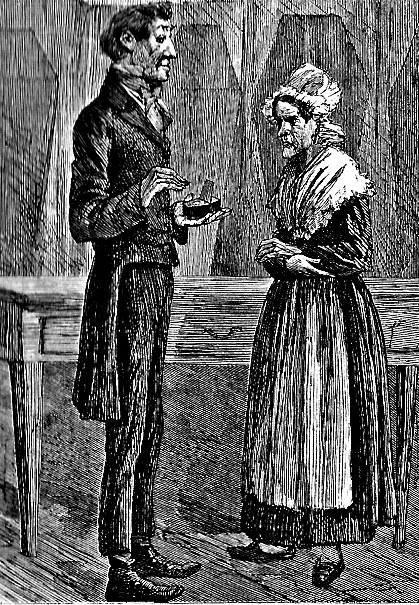
- Mr Sowerberry opens his coffin-shaped snuffbox before his wife - Sol Eytinge Jr. (1867)
- First appearance: Oliver Twist
- Created by: Charles Dickens

In-universe information
- Gender: Male
- Occupation: Designer of coffins
- Spouse: Mrs Sowerberry

Mr Sowerberry is a fictional character who appears as a supporting antagonist in Charles Dickens' 1838 novel Oliver Twist. He is an undertaker and coffin maker who owns and operates a small dark shop in a small town some 75 miles (121 km) from London. This shop also serves as a dwelling for himself, his wife, a maidservant named Charlotte, an assistant named Noah Claypole. For a short period it's also the dwelling of the protagonist of the novel, a young boy named Oliver Twist who has been "purchased" from the local parish workhouse to serve as an apprentice.

== Description ==
In the novel Sowerberry is described as a "tall gaunt, large jointed man, attired in a suit of threadbare black, with darned cotton stockings of the same colour, and shoes to answer". Stage and screen adaptations have tended to interpret this description in the guise of a slim, grey haired, older male. Funerary practices and social customs of the time add depth to this character sometimes presenting him as a weak, miserly, menacing and unwelcome dark spectre.

Although portrayed somewhat humorously in the musical adaptation of the novel, particularly in his feigning subservience to Mrs Sowerberry, Mr Sowerberry is nonetheless a miser who, despite what wealth he has acquired over the years, does very little to improve the squalid lives of those around him simply because he believes it is the job of others and is therefore none of his concern. In the scene where he visits the home of a destitute family whose mother has died, there is no overt callousness, it is merely a job and nothing more.

Although to some extent he seems kindly disposed to Oliver, after a justified rebellion due to bullying by the older Noah and his callous attack on the memory of the orphan's deceased mother, he severely interrogates the boy. When his shrew of a wife unsympathetically takes Noah's side, backing his taunting insults of Oliver's parentage, the orphan defiantly accuses her of lying. His wife's outraged reaction leaves the spineless Mr Sowerberry with no alternative but to give the boy a severe caning. For Oliver this is the last straw and inspires him to run away to London to seek his fortune. What happens to the Sowerberrys following Oliver's departure we are not told, except that their servants Noah and Charlotte later steal money from them and run away to London themselves, to be taken in by Fagin and his band of young rogues.

== The character ==
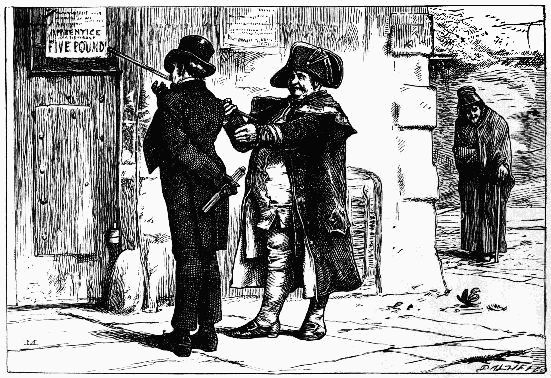
The Beadle argues the benefits of apprenticing a workhouse boy to Mr Sowerberry

Dickens created Sowerberry's name and character from his observation of living examples in the society in which he lived. Dickens had extensive knowledge of London street life; of the "real" poor and "false" rich. His novels are full of characters with odd sounding names which in reality assist the reader in visualizing the character itself. For example, a "sour berry" may make the reader grimace or think of something unpalatable, stale or stagnant. In the novel, Dickens creates an image of the undertaker we have come to recognize so well as represented in the modern media: an older tallish, thin man wearing all black, the costume of his trade. But, as a contrast, there are also moments in the novel where he appears benevolent or doting, almost genial. Sowerberry is portrayed as subordinate to his wife in many aspects of the family business and domestic situation.

Dickens includes at least two similar characters in other novels. In Martin Chuzzlewit the undertaker is known as Mr Mould, a balding elderly man in a black suit with "a face in which a queer attempt at melancholy was at odds with a smirk of satisfaction"; while Mr Omer in David Copperfield is presented as "a merry little old man in black, with rusty little bunches of ribbons at the knees of his breeches, black stockings and a broad brimmed hat".

== Middle class attitudes ==
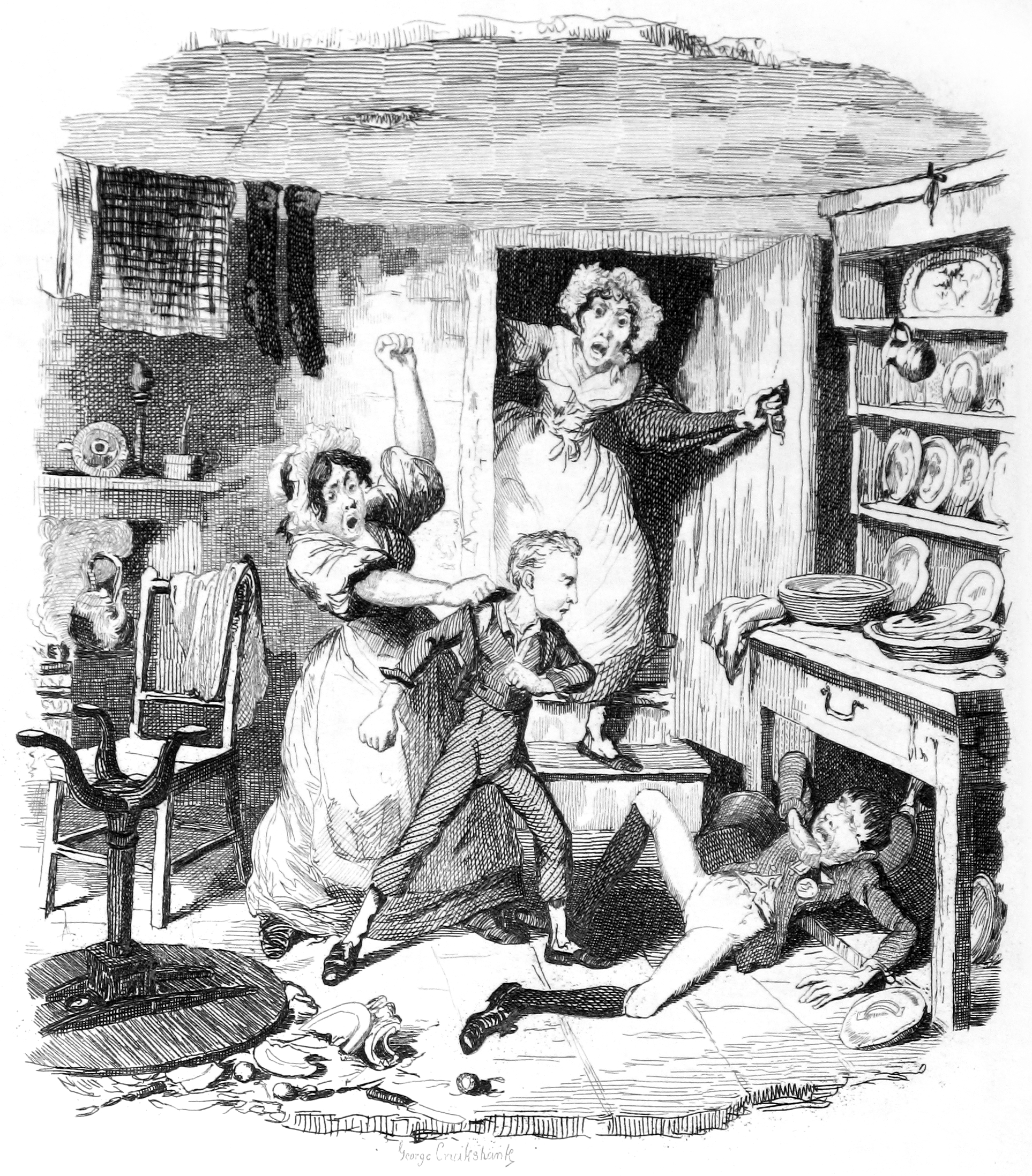
Oliver in Sowerberry's shop, by George Cruikshank.

Sowerberry is representative of a stereotype typical to the English Georgian period and Victorian era of the 19th century, and to his trade. It is likely he belonged to the lower middle class of business owners. Their sole aim was to keep themselves in reasonable comfort as compared to the poorer classes of the time, to protect what reputations they had and retain a little money in their pockets. When Oliver is presented to him as an apprentice his thoughts are on what profit could be made from taking the boy rather than on what was best for his up-bringing.

Typical to its historical era the mourning period after the death of a loved one was an important social custom that entailed certain protocols as did the funeral itself. Specially designed black clothing, a slow moving funeral cortege, even paid mourners at the graveside, were features offered by most city undertakers. Dickens found much of this a mockery as he later commented on in his journal Household Words, describing such practices as "grotesque" and "exaggerated". The pointless expense was further highlighted by him when he described the role of the mute in his novel Martin Chuzzlewit, "...Two mutes were at the house door, looking as mournful as could reasonably be expected of men with such a thriving job in hand..."

== Film, theatre and television ==
English adaptations of the novel have included numerous actors, some well known, in the character of Mr Sowerberry. The earliest known motion picture version of Frank Lloyd's 1922 production placed the American actor Nelson McDowell in the role. David Lean created some very atmospheric settings in his movie version Oliver Twist which featured Gibb McLaughlin as Mr Sowerberry.

With the advent of television it was inevitable that the classic tale become a miniseries and in 1962 the BBC enlisted the talents of Donald Eccles to play the role of the undertaker.

In 1960 the novel Oliver Twist was further adapted by Lionel Bart as the musical Oliver! which premiered in the West End. The original cast included the Australian Barry Humphries in the role. The character was given a first name of Henry and a minor singing role with the song, 'That's Your Funeral'. Oliver! was brought to Broadway in 1963 and later revived in 1984.

Following the success of the theatrical musical presentation, a motion picture version of that adaptation was produced in 1968 with Leonard Rossiter as Mr Sowerberry. In this portrayal the undertaker's cool, and sometimes cruel, traits are largely underplayed and are replaced by his fondness for intoxicating drink. This is in line with Bart's adaptation of the original novel.

In the 1982 made-for-TV movie version, Mr Sowerberry is portrayed by Philip Locke and three years later by Raymond Witch in another BBC series. In the latter, Sowerberry is pleasantly disposed to Oliver and sees him as a promising apprentice until the incident with Noah Claypole, who bullies Oliver out of jealousy.

In 1994, Oliver! was revived at the Palladium Theatre in London and again in 2009.

Roger Lloyd-Pack played Sowerberry in the ITV Network miniseries of the Dickens novel in 1999.

The 2005, Roman Polanski production enlisted the services of Michael Heath as the undertaker.

In the 2007 BBC television adaptation he is played by John Sessions.

In December 2008, Oliver! was revived at the Theatre Royal, Drury Lane, London with Julian Bleach playing both Sowerberry and Grimwig. Ashley Artus played Sowerberry for Sir Cameron Mackintosh in the UK tour.
