= Where Is Love? =

Song performed by Shirley Bassey

Song
- Released: 1960
- Genre: Musical
- Songwriter: Lionel Bart

"Where Is Love?" is a song from the Tony Award-winning British musical Oliver! and the 1968 film of the same name, based on the 1838 novel Oliver Twist by Charles Dickens. The musical was written by Lionel Bart and was first staged in London's West End in 1960. Oliver is a young boy on the search for his mother, and comes across many people, friends and criminals alike.

== Background ==
Oliver Twist, the leading character, sings the song after being thrown into the cellar of a funeral parlour for getting into a fight with Noah Claypole, another servant of the undertaker. Later in the show, a reprise is sung by Mr. Brownlow's housekeeper, Mrs Bedwin.

In the 1968 Columbia Pictures musical film version of Oliver!, "Where Is Love?" was performed onscreen by Mark Lester, whose singing voice was reportedly dubbed by Kathe Green (the daughter of the film's conductor and musical arranger, Johnny Green), though Lester was actually given credit on the soundtrack album.

== Cover versions ==
- Sammy Davis Jr. on his 1966 album, Sammy Davis Jr. Sings and Laurindo Almeida Plays.
- Oliver on his 1969 album, Good Morning Starshine
- Irene Kral on her album Where Is Love?
- Leonard Nimoy on his 1967 album Leonard Nimoy Presents Mr. Spock's Music from Outer Space
