= Reviewing the Situation (song) =

Lionel Bart song written for 1960 musical Oliver!

Song by Ron Moody

from the album Oliver!
- Released: 1960
- Genre: Show tune
- Label: Decca
- Songwriter: Lionel Bart

"Reviewing the Situation" is a song written by Lionel Bart for the 1960 musical Oliver!, based upon the 1838 novel Oliver Twist by Charles Dickens. It is sung by the character of Fagin, at a moral crossroads towards the end of the musical as he reconsiders his criminal lifestyle. It was introduced by English actor Ron Moody, who played Fagin in the original London production of the musical as well as its 1968 film adaptation and two revivals, in the West End and on Broadway, in 1983 and 1984 respectively.

== Background ==
Lionel Bart originally intended Fagin's songs in the musical to be sung straight, but Ron Moody considered numbers such as "Reviewing the Situation" to "[leap] off the page as comic turns". The song's lyric, in which Fagin ponders "can a fellow be a villain all his life?", reveals a sympathetic side to the character. In 1960, critic Milton Shulman predicted that the song "should go a long way to converting Fagin into a loveable character on the level of the Crazy Gang".

Several commentators have likened the composition to Jewish music. Allan Neuwirth, writing in The Forward in 2026, remarked that the song is "practically a cantor’s aria, ornamented with flourishes I’ve heard at countless High Holiday services." The 2024 West End revival of Oliver! adds four bars of klezmer music to the arrangement.

Speaking in 2012, Moody described the sequence for the song, in which Fagin sings "torn between the safety of the kitchen and the dangers of the world outside", as his proudest moment in the 1968 film. He reprised the song, in character as Fagin, during the 1985 Royal Variety Performance.

== In popular culture ==
- In 1969, the song was recorded in a rock arrangement by Sandie Shaw as the title track on her fifth album.
- A 2013 documentary about Lionel Bart's life is titled after the song.
