= Shani Wallis =

English actress and singer (born 1933)

- Born: 14 April 1933 (age 93); Tottenham, London, England
- Citizenship: United Kingdom; United States
- Education: Royal Academy of Dramatic Art
- Occupations: Actress, singer
- Years active: 1952–2006, 2026
- Spouse: Bernie Rich (m. 1968; died 2016)
- Children: One

Shani Wallis IPA: /ˈʃeɪniː/ (born 14 April 1933) is an English actress and singer, who has worked in theatre, film, and television in both her native United Kingdom and in the United States. A graduate of the Royal Academy of Dramatic Art, she is known for her roles in the West End and Broadway and for the role of Nancy in the 1968 Oscar-winning film musical Oliver!

Writer and critic Kenneth Tynan has described her as "the English Judy Garland".

== Biography ==
Wallis was born in Tottenham, London, and made her first stage appearance at the age of four. She studied ballet and dance before gaining a scholarship at the Royal Academy of Dramatic Art.

She made her theatrical debut in a lead role as young princess Maria in Call Me Madam at the London Coliseum in March 1952. Wallis sprang to global fame when appearing as Nancy in the Oscar-winning musical film Oliver! in 1968, starring alongside Oliver Reed as Bill Sikes, Ron Moody as Fagin, Jack Wild as the Artful Dodger, and Mark Lester as Oliver. Afterwards, Wallis received an offer to star in the television series The Brady Bunch, but turned it down because she wanted to do more musicals.

Wallis is a naturalised citizen of the United States, where she has lived for more than 40 years. She married her agent, Bernie Rich, on 13 September 1968; the couple have one daughter and two granddaughters. Wallis is a patron of the theatre charity The Music Hall Guild of Great Britain and America.

Wallis made a surprise appearance at a recording of Britain's Got Talent at the age of 92, singing "As Long as He Needs Me". Her performance was cut from the broadcast, but was widely viewed on YouTube and the show Britain's Got Talent Unseen.

== Selected credits ==
=== Features ===
Year	Title	Role	Notes
1956	Ramsbottom Rides Again	Joan Ramsbottom	
1956	The Extra Day	Shirley	
1957	A King in New York	Cabaret Singer	
1968	Oliver!	Nancy	
1973	Arnold	Jocelyn	
1973	Terror in the Wax Museum	Laurie Mell	
1986	The Great Mouse Detective	Lady Mouse (voice)	
1992	Round Numbers	Binky	
1995	The Pebble and the Penguin	narrator	
2006	Mojave Phone Booth	Greta (voice)	

=== Television films ===
Year	Title	Role
1957	A Santa for Christmas	
1964	Once Upon a Mattress	Lady Larken
1976	Mayday at 40,000 Feet	Terry Dunlanp
1995	Columbo: Strange Bedfellows	Gwen

=== Selected TV ===
Year	Title	Role	Notes
1959	Frankly Howerd	The Pianist	
1960	Val Parnell's Spectacular		Episode: "Johnnie Ray Sings"
1961	Two of a Kind	Performer	
1963–1964	The Garry Moore Show		
1965	The Dean Martin Show	Performer	singing "I'm a Girl" and "How Are Things in Glocca Morra?"
1965	The Red Skelton Hour	Performer	episode singing "I'm Old Fashioned" and singing/dancing "Pass Me By"
1966	Mickie Finn's	Herself	
1968	The Harry Secombe Show		
1969-1970	This Is Tom Jones		
1971	Night Gallery	Miss Danton	Segment: "The Doll"
1973	Gunsmoke	Stella Silks	2 episodes
1975	Police Story	Janet Stiles	Episode: "Headhunter"
1977	Charlie's Angels	Ellen Jason	Episode: "Angels in the Wings"
1981	Fantasy Island	Wife in towel	Episode: "Cyrano/The Magician"
1989	Murder, She Wrote	Olivia Waverley	Episode: "Night of the Tarantula"
2000	One World	Ms. Cosgrove	Episode: "Roots"
2004	The Young and the Restless	Frances the Governess	
2026	Britain's Got Talent	Contestant	

=== Theatre ===
- Call Me Madam, (1952), London Coliseum (as Princess Marie)
- Wish You Were Here, (1953), London Casino (as Fay Tomkin)
- Happy As a King, (1953), Princes Theatre, London (as Juliet)
- Wonderful Town (1954), London Casino
- Irma La Douce (1961), Lyric Theatre (title role)
- Fine Fettle (1959), Palace Theatre
- Green Room Rags (1954), Princes Theatre
- The Dave King Show, (1956), London Hippodrome
- Aladdin, (pantomime), (1955), Streatham Hill Theatre (as Aladdin)
- King Cole (pantomime, 1962), Palace Manchester (as Miranda)
- Bells Are Ringing (1958), Princess Theatre, Melbourne
- Bus Stop (1958), Golders Green Hippodrome (as Cherie)
- You'll Be Lucky, (1954), Adelphi Theatre with Lauri Lupino Lane
- Cowardy Custard (1989), Theatre Royal Bath
- A Time for Singing (1966), Broadway Theater
- Finian's Rainbow (1958), New Shakespeare Theatre
- 42nd Street, (1985), Drury Lane Theatre
- Follies (1990), Long Beach Civic Light Opera, 20th Anniversary Revival (as Sally Durant Plummer)
- Always (1997), Victoria Palace Theatre

== Recordings ==
- Call Me Madam – original London stage recording (1952)
- Wish You Were Here – original London stage recording (1953)
- Shani! EP (1960) – Philips BBE 12337 ("Personality", "Please Don't Say No", "Don't Take Your Love Away from Me", "There Goes My Heart")
- A Time for Singing (1966) – original Broadway cast recording
- I'm a Girl! LP (1967) – Kapp Records KS-3472
- Look to Love LP (1967) – Kapp Records KS-3527
- Oliver! (1968) – original film cast recording
- As Long As He Needs Me LP (1968) – Kapp Records KS-3573
- The Girl from Oliver LP (1969) – Kapp Records KS-3606
