= Oliver! (song) =

Song by Keith Hamshere, Hope Jackman, Paul Whitsun-Jones and Original London Cast Boys

from the album Oliver!
- Published: 1960
- Released: 1960
- Recorded: 1960
- Genre: Show tune
- Length: 1:45
- Label: Decca
- Songwriter: Lionel Bart
- Producer: Mike Smith

"Oliver!" is the title song from the 1960s original West End and Broadway musical Oliver! and the 1968 film of the same name.

== Background ==
The song begins with the workhouse boys and Mr. Bumble praying for the food they will receive and for a blessing of thankfulness. However, Oliver asks for more gruel and that makes Mr. Bumble and the Widow Corney very angry at him and they think of ways to punish him for his ingratitude and ask who he is. The punishment that Oliver is to receive, as stated in the song is that he is to be sent down a stairway without a bannister and to be fed cockroaches served in a canister or they would push Oliver up a chimney full of soot. Even the Board of Governors is stunned by Oliver's ingratitude and join in the song. The punishment that the Board of Governors suggest is that Oliver should be imprisoned and put up for sale for apprenticeship.

In the 1968 film, the verse referencing using Oliver as a chimney brush is excised and the previous verse is instead reprised. The Board of Governors do not sing either, and the song concludes with Mr. Bumble realising that as the one who named the boy, responsibility will fall on him.
