= Oom-Pah-Pah =

Song in "Oliver!" (1960 musical)

"Oom-Pah-Pah" is a show tune with music and lyrics by Lionel Bart, featured in the 1960 musical Oliver!, in which it is sung by Nancy and the crowd at the "Three Cripples" tavern. Although not an original music hall song, it recalls that genre. In terms of both its tempo and suggestiveness, it shares characteristics with such late 19th century songs as "Ta-ra-ra Boom-de-ay".

In the stage musical, the song opens Act II and does not directly contribute to the storyline. For the 1968 film version, the song was moved near the end and served a dramatic purpose: Bill Sikes refuses to let Nancy take Oliver out of the pub and, unbeknownst to him, to Mr. Brownlow for rescue. He orders Bullseye to guard Oliver while he discusses matters with Fagin. Nancy then begins the song, gradually rousing the pub crowd into a raucous singalong in hopes that their noise will drown out Bullseye’s barking long enough for her to spirit Oliver away.

The chime of the song is often used in carnival-like music.
