= Oliver Twist =

1837–1839 novel by Charles Dickens

Oliver Twist; or, The Parish Boy's Progress
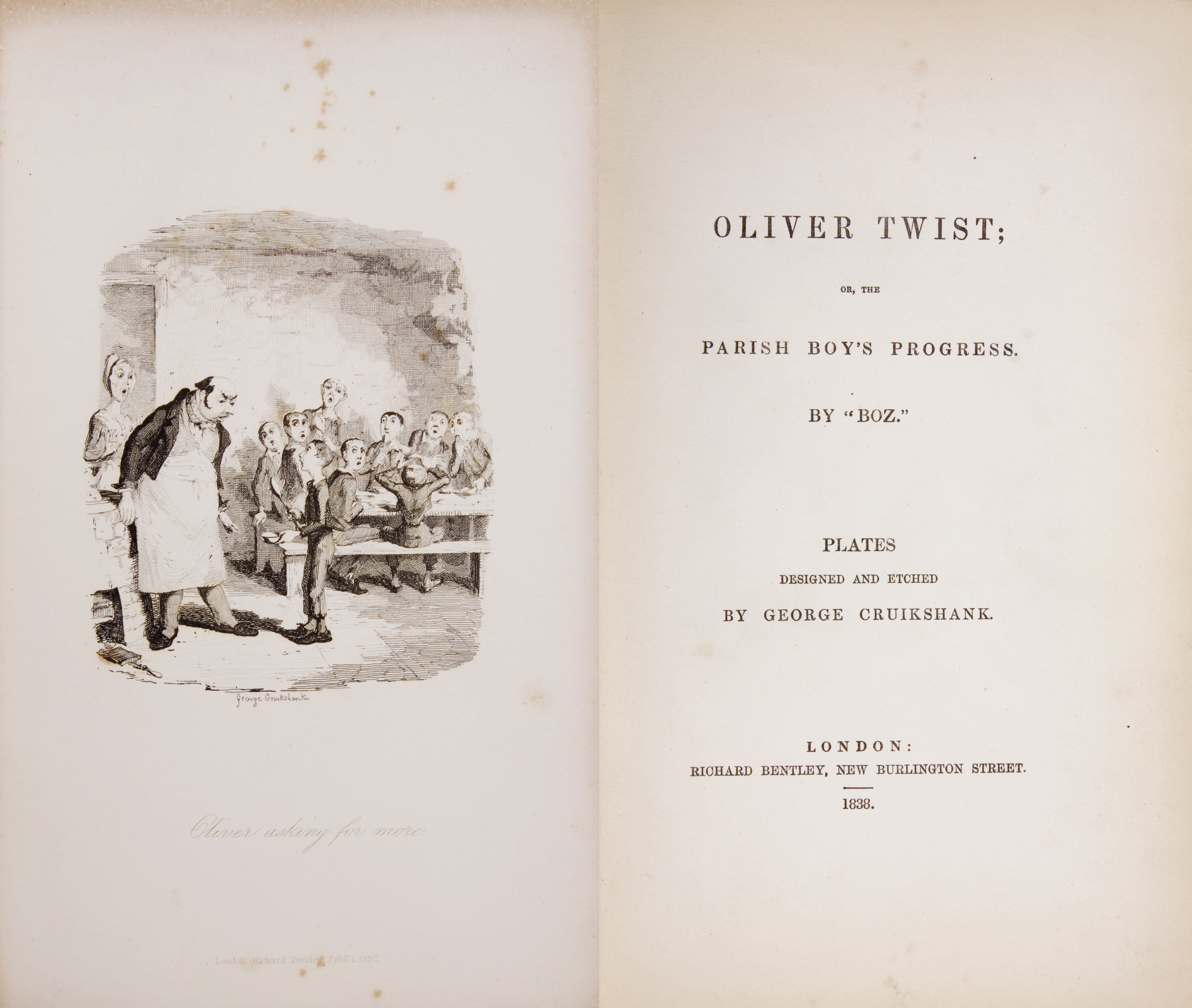
- Frontispiece and title-page, first edition 1838; Illustration and design by George Cruikshank
- Author: Charles Dickens
- Illustrator: George Cruikshank
- Language: English
- Genre: Serial novel
- Published: Serialised 1837–1839; book form 1838
- Publisher: Serial: Bentley's Miscellany; Book: Richard Bentley
- Publication place: United Kingdom
- OCLC: 185812519
- Preceded by: The Pickwick Papers
- Followed by: Nicholas Nickleby
- Text: Oliver Twist; or, The Parish Boy's Progress at Wikisource

Oliver Twist; or, The Parish Boy's Progress, is the second novel by English author Charles Dickens. It was originally published as a serial from 1837 to 1839 and as a three-volume book in 1838. The story follows orphan Oliver Twist, who, after being raised in a workhouse, escapes to London, where he meets a gang of juvenile pickpockets led by the elderly criminal Fagin, discovers the secrets of his parentage, and reconnects with his remaining family.

Oliver Twist unromantically portrays the sordid lives of criminals and exposes the cruel treatment of the many orphans in England in the mid-19th century. The alternative title, The Parish Boy's Progress, alludes to Bunyan's The Pilgrim's Progress as well as the 18th-century caricature series by painter William Hogarth, A Rake's Progress and A Harlot's Progress.

In an early example of the social novel, Dickens satirises child labour, domestic violence, the recruitment of children as criminals, and the presence of street children. The novel may have been inspired by the story of Robert Blincoe, an orphan whose account of working as a child labourer in a cotton mill was widely read in the 1830s. It is likely that Dickens's own experiences as a youth contributed as well, considering he spent two years of his life in the workhouse at the age of 12 and subsequently missed out on some of his education.

Oliver Twist has been the subject of numerous adaptations, including the 1948 film of the same name, starring Alec Guinness as Fagin; a highly successful musical, Oliver! (itself adapted into the Oscar-winning 1968 film), and Disney's 1988 animated feature film Oliver & Company.

== Publications ==
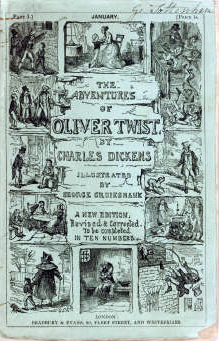
Cover, first edition of serial, entitled "The Adventures of Oliver Twist", January 1846

The novel was first published in monthly instalments, from February 1837 to April 1839, in the magazine Bentley's Miscellany. It was originally intended to form part of Dickens's serial, The Mudfog Papers. George Cruikshank provided one steel etching per month to illustrate each instalment. The novel first appeared in book form six months before the initial serialisation was completed, in three volumes published by Richard Bentley, the owner of Bentley's Miscellany, under the author's pseudonym, "Boz". It included 24 steel-engraved plates by Cruikshank.

The first edition was titled: Oliver Twist, or, The Parish Boy's Progress.

Serial publication dates:

- I: February 1837 (chapters 1–2)
- II: March 1837 (chapters 3–4)
- III: April 1837 (chapters 5–6)
- IV: May 1837 (chapters 7–8)
- V: July 1837 (chapters 9–11)
- VI: August 1837 (chapters 12–13)
- VII: September 1837 (chapters 14–15)
- VIII: November 1837 (chapters 16–17)
- IX: December 1837 (chapters 18–19)
- X: January 1838 (chapters 20–22)
- XI: February 1838 (chapters 23–25)
- XII: March 1838 (chapters 26–27)
- XIII: April 1838 (chapters 28–30)
- XIV: May 1838 (chapters 31–32)
- XV: June 1838 (chapters 33–34)
- XVI: July 1838 (chapters 35–37)
- XVII: August 1838 (chapters 38–part of 39)
- XVIII: October 1838 (conclusion of chapters 39–41)
- XIX: November 1838 (chapters 42–43)
- XX: December 1838 (chapters 44–46)
- XXI: January 1839 (chapters 47–49)
- XXII: February 1839 (chapter 50)
- XXIII: March 1839 (chapter 51)
- XXIV: April 1839 (chapters 52–53)

== Plot ==
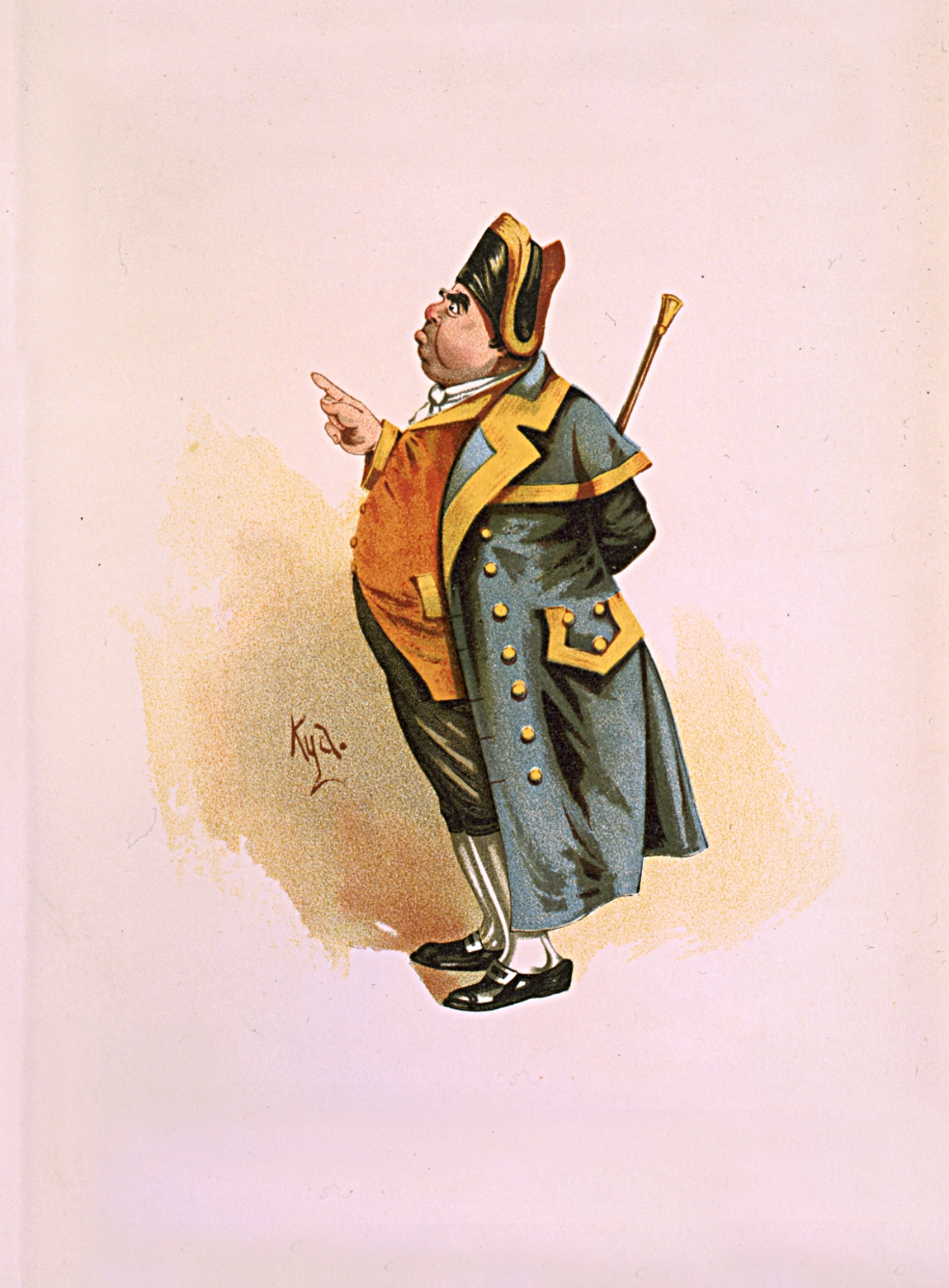
Mr Bumble by Kyd (Joseph Clayton Clark)

Oliver Twist is born into a life of poverty and misfortune, raised in a workhouse in a town some 70 miles from London. The children working there receive very little food; after six months, they draw lots, with the loser asking for another portion of gruel. Oliver is designated, and so he approaches the master of the workhouse and requests a second helping. A great uproar ensues at this perceived act of rebellion.

Oliver is removed from the workhouse and put in solitary confinement; he is flogged every day by the beadle, Mr Bumble, of which three times a week are in front of the other boys. After some time Oliver is offered at a premium as an apprentice; he is taken on by Mr Sowerberry, an undertaker. One day, his jealous co-apprentice, Noah Claypole, insults Oliver's mother and an enraged Oliver attacks him. When he is punished by Mr Bumble and Mr Sowerberry, Oliver runs away to London to seek a better life.

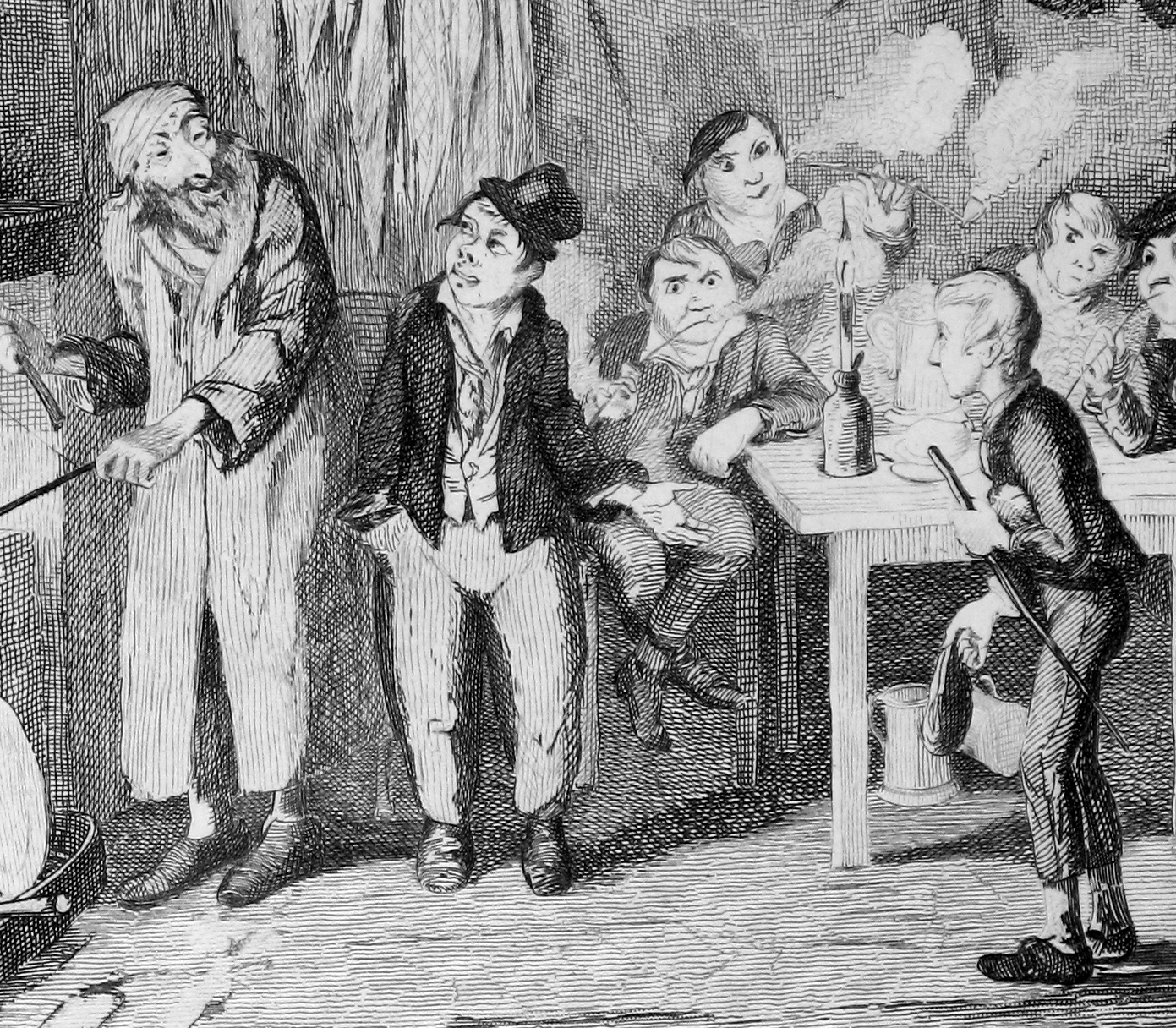
George Cruikshank original etching of the Artful Dodger (centre), here introducing Oliver (right) to Fagin (left)

Oliver meets a young man named Jack Dawkins who calls himself "the Artful Dodger", offers him food and lodging and takes him to meet an infamous criminal known as Fagin, who trains orphan boys as pickpockets. Oliver innocently begins Fagin's training, but when he goes out with the Dodger and another boy and sees them stealing a handkerchief from an old gentleman named Mr Brownlow, he realizes the truth. While the Dodger and the other boy escape, Oliver is pursued, apprehended, formally arrested and tried before Magistrate Fang. Interceding for Oliver, Brownlow takes him home and cares for him. As Oliver recovers, Brownlow and his housekeeper notice that Oliver resembles a woman depicted in a portrait hanging in Brownlow's home.

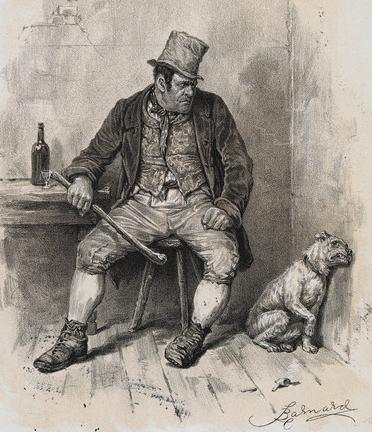
Bill Sikes by Fred Barnard

Worried that Oliver might incriminate him and his gang, Fagin sends a young woman named Nancy and her abusive lover, the robber Bill Sikes, to abduct Oliver and bring him back to Fagin's lair. Fagin forces him to participate in a burglary planned by Sikes. The robbery goes wrong; while Sikes escapes, Oliver, after having been wounded, ends up in the care of the people he was supposed to rob: Miss Rose and her guardian Mrs Maylie.

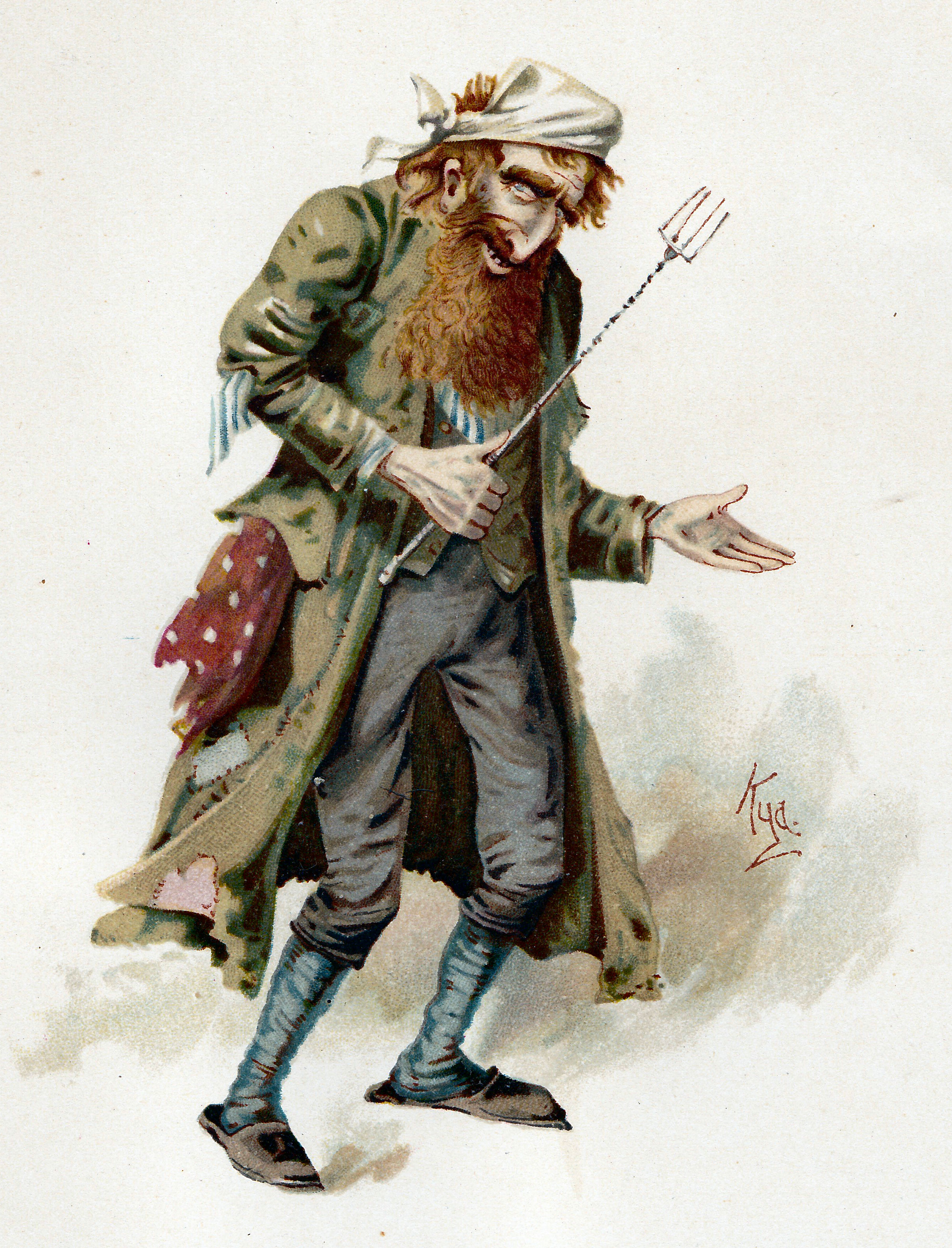
Fagin by 'Kyd' (1889)

A mysterious man, known only as "Monks", teams up with Fagin, to prevent Oliver from learning of his past. Monks bribes Mr Bumble and his new wife, the former Widow Corney, for information on Oliver. Together, they dispose of a ring and medallion that had once belonged to Oliver's mother and had been stolen from her after she died. Nancy, racked with guilt for her role in Oliver's kidnapping, secretly spies on them and passes the information on to Rose Maylie, who tells Mr Brownlow. Meanwhile, the Artful Dodger is arrested for pickpocketing, tried and sentenced to transportation to Australia.

Noah Claypole, who had fled to London with the Sowerberrys' maid Charlotte after robbing Mr Sowerberry, joins Fagin's gang. Following Fagin's orders, he follows Nancy and discovers that she meets with Mr Brownlow and Rose for the sake of Oliver's welfare. Fearing that Nancy has betrayed him and Sikes (which, unknown to him, she has refused to do), Fagin passes the information on to Sikes, who beats Nancy to death in a fit of rage and goes into hiding. He is recognised by an angry mob and attempts to flee. Going to Toby Crackit's hideout, he learns that Fagin has been arrested. When the mob catches up to him, Sikes tries to escape over the rooftops by swinging on a rope, but while he is about to loop the rope about himself a vision of the dead Nancy's staring eyes terrorises him into losing his balance. In the fall, the looped rope catches him around the neck and hangs him.

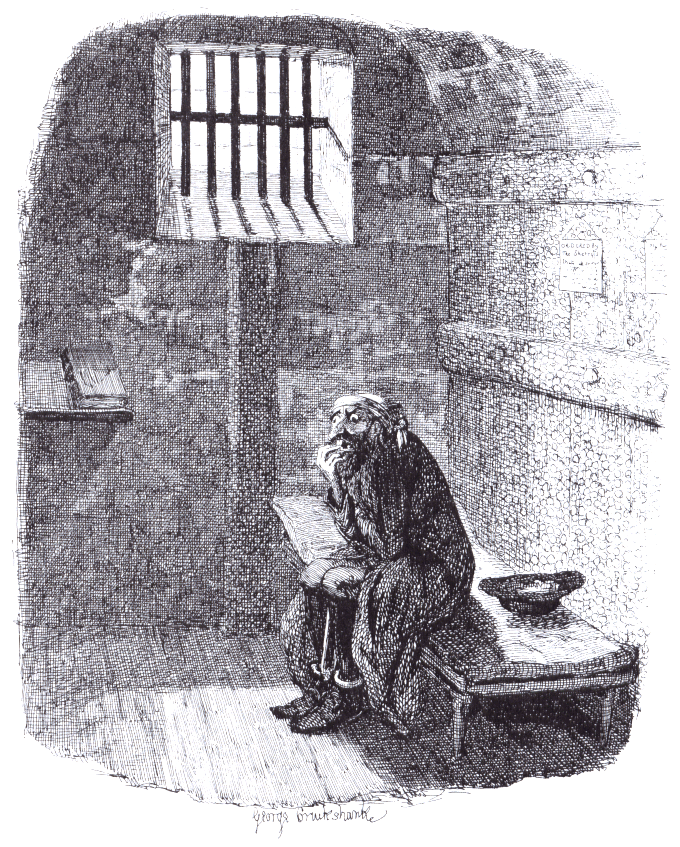
Fagin in his cell, by British caricaturist George Cruikshank

Mr Brownlow has Monks arrested and forces him to divulge his secrets: he is actually Oliver's half-brother and had hoped to steal Oliver's half of their rightful inheritance. Monks emigrates to America, but squanders his money, relapses into crime and dies in prison. Fagin is arrested and sentenced to the gallows. The day before his execution, Oliver and Mr Brownlow visit him in Newgate Prison and learn the location of the documents proving Oliver's identity. Bumble and his wife lose their jobs and are forced to become inmates of the workhouse. Rose Maylie, who turns out to be Oliver's maternal aunt, marries and enjoys a long life. Oliver lives happily as Mr Brownlow's adopted son.

== Characters ==
- Oliver Twist – an orphan child whose mother died at his birth
- Mr Bumble – the beadle of the parish where Oliver was born
- Mrs Mann – the self-centred and greedy superintendent where the infant Oliver is placed until age 9
- Mr Sowerberry – an undertaker who took Oliver as apprentice
- Mrs Sowerberry – Mr Sowerberry's wife
- Noah Claypole – a cowardly bully, Sowerberry's apprentice
- Charlotte – the Sowerberrys' maid, lover of Noah
- Mr Gamfield – a brutal chimney sweep in the town where Oliver was born
- Mr Brownlow – a kind gentleman who takes Oliver in, his first benefactor
- Mr Grimwig – a friend of Mr Brownlow, outwardly cynical, but really empathetic at heart
- Mrs Bedwin – Mr Brownlow's motherly housekeeper
- Rose Maylie – Oliver's second benefactor, later found to be his aunt
- Mrs Lindsay Maylie – Harry Maylie's mother, Rose Maylie's adoptive aunt
- Harry Maylie – Mrs Maylie's son, in love with Rose
- Mr Losberne – Mrs Maylie's family doctor
- Mr Giles – Mrs Maylie's butler
- Mr Brittles – Mrs Maylie's handyman
- Duff and Blathers – two incompetent policemen
- Fagin – fence and boss of a criminal gang of young boys and girls
- Bill Sikes – a professional burglar
- Bull's Eye – Bill Sikes' vicious dog
- Jack Dawkins, The Artful Dodger – Fagin's most adept pickpocket
- Charley Bates – a pickpocket in Fagin's gang and the Artful Dodger's trusted sidekick
- Toby Crackit – an associate of Fagin and Sikes, a house-breaker
- Nancy – one of Fagin's gang, now living with Bill Sikes
- Bet – a girl in Fagin's gang, sometime friend to Nancy
- Barney – a Jewish criminal cohort of Fagin and Toby Crackit who speaks with a nasal intonation
- Agnes Fleming – Oliver's mother and Rose Maylie's elder sister
- Mr Edwin Leeford – father of Oliver and Monks
- Old Sally – a nurse who attended Oliver's birth
- Mrs Corney (later Mrs Bumble) – matron for the women's workhouse who marries Bumble but despises and dominates him
- Monks – a sickly criminal, an associate of Fagin's, and long-lost half-brother of Oliver
- Monks's mother – an heiress who did not love her husband
- Mr Fang – a magistrate
- Tom Chitling – one of Fagin's gang members, returned from prison

== Major themes and symbols ==
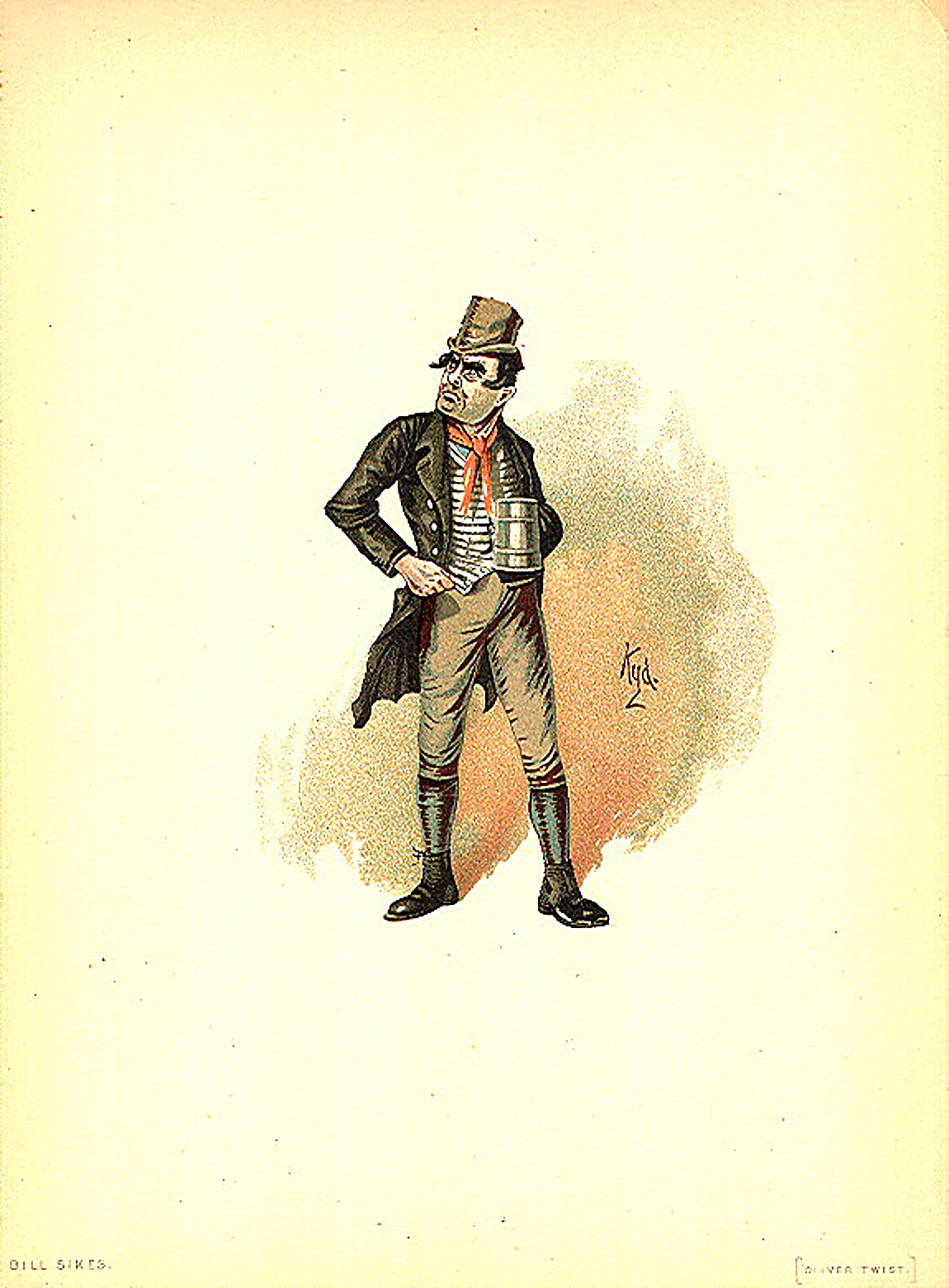
Bill Sikes by Kyd (Joseph Clayton Clarke)

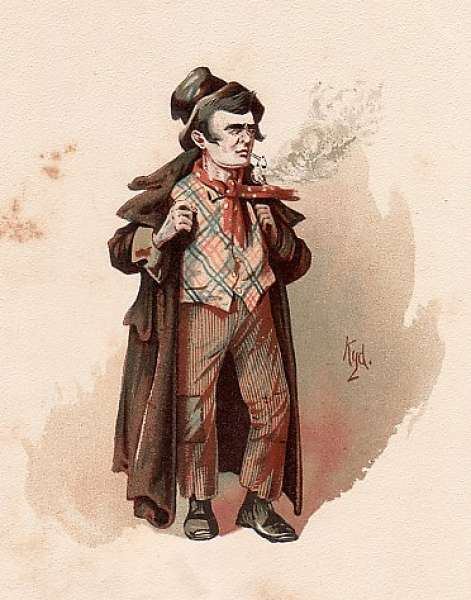
The Artful Dodger by Kyd (Joseph Clayton Clarke)

In Oliver Twist, Dickens mixes grim realism with merciless satire to describe the effects of industrialism on 19th-century England and to criticise the harsh new Poor Laws. Oliver, an innocent child, is trapped in a world where his only options seem to be the workhouse, a life of crime symbolised by Fagin's gang, a prison, or death. From this unpromising industrial/institutional setting, however, a fairy tale also emerges. In the midst of corruption and degradation, the essentially passive Oliver remains pure-hearted; he steers away from evil when those around him give in to it, and in proper fairy-tale fashion, he eventually receives his reward – leaving for a peaceful life in the country, surrounded by kind friends. On the way to this happy ending, Dickens explores the kind of life an outcast, orphan boy could expect to lead in 1830s London.

=== Poverty and social class ===
Poverty is a prominent concern in Oliver Twist. Throughout the novel, Dickens enlarged on this theme, describing slums so decrepit that whole rows of houses are on the point of ruin. In an early chapter, Oliver attends a pauper's funeral with Mr Sowerberry and sees a whole family crowded together in one miserable room. This prevalent misery makes Oliver's encounters with charity and love more poignant. Oliver owes his life several times over to kindness both large and small.

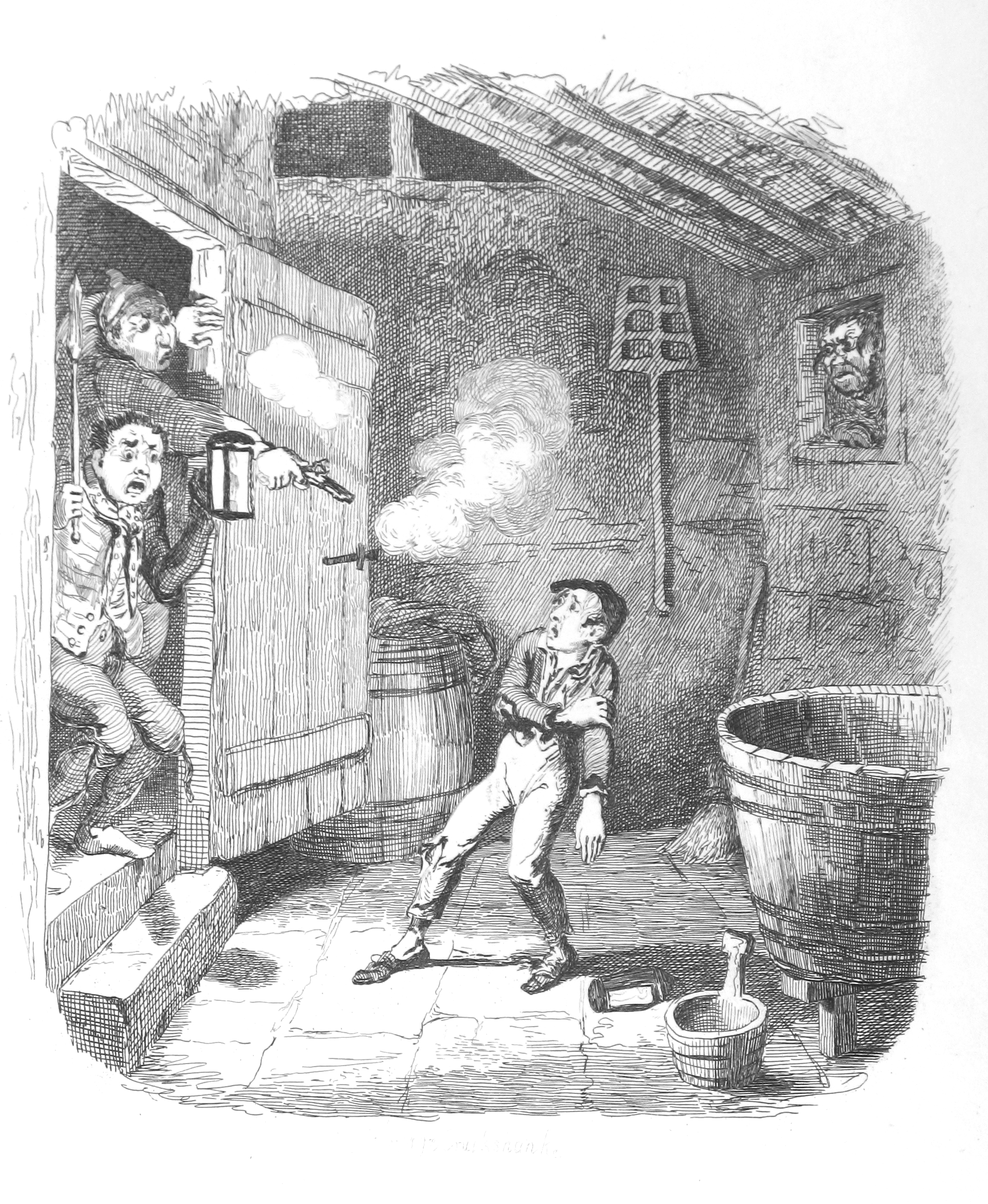
Oliver is wounded in a burglary, by George Cruikshank.

=== Symbolism ===
Dickens makes considerable use of symbolism. The "merry old gentleman" Fagin, for example, has satanic characteristics: he is a veteran corrupter of young boys who presides over his own corner of the criminal world; he makes his first appearance standing over a fire holding a toasting fork, and he refuses to pray on the night before his execution.

=== Characters ===
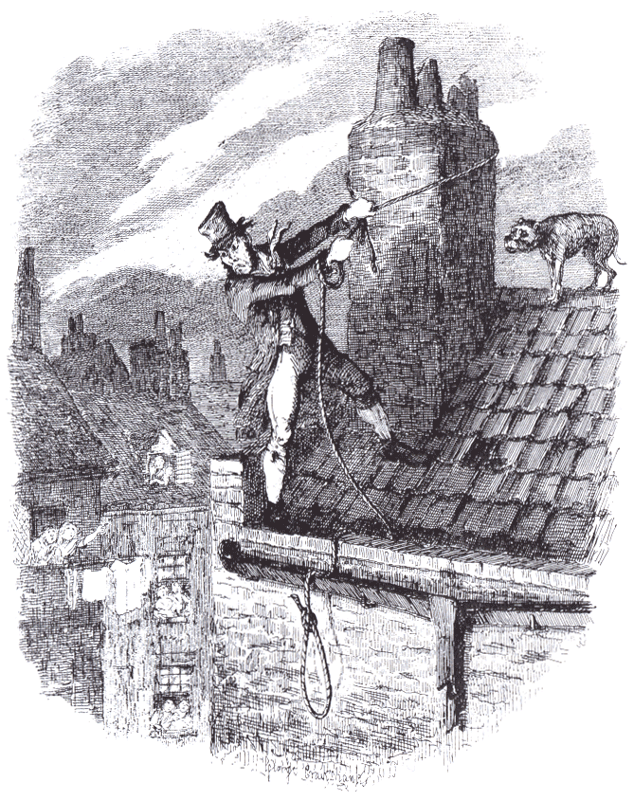
The Last Chance, by Cruikshank.

In the tradition of Restoration comedy and Henry Fielding, Dickens fits his characters with appropriate names. Oliver himself, though "badged and ticketed" as a lowly orphan and named according to an alphabetical system, is, in fact, "all of a twist." However, Oliver and his name may have been based on a young workhouse boy named Peter Tolliver whom Dickens knew while growing up.

Bill Sikes's dog, Bull's-eye, has "faults of temper in common with his owner" and is an emblem of his owner's character. The dog's viciousness represents Sikes's animal-like brutality while Sikes's self-destructiveness is evident in the dog's many scars. The dog, with its willingness to harm anyone on Sikes's whim, shows the mindless brutality of the master. This is also illustrated when Bull's-eye dies immediately after his master.

Nancy, by contrast, redeems herself at the cost of her own life and dies in a prayerful pose. She is one of the few characters in Oliver Twist to display much ambivalence. Her storyline in the novel strongly reflects themes of domestic violence and psychological abuse at the hands of Bill. Although Nancy is a full-fledged criminal, indoctrinated and trained by Fagin since childhood, she retains enough empathy to repent her role in Oliver's kidnapping, and to take steps to try to atone. As one of Fagin's victims, corrupted but not yet morally dead, she gives eloquent voice to the horrors of the old man's little criminal empire. She wants to save Oliver from a similar fate; at the same time, she recoils from the idea of turning traitor, especially to Bill Sikes, whom she loves. When Dickens was later criticised for giving to a "thieving, whoring slut of the streets" such an unaccountable reversal of character, he ascribed her change of heart to "the last fair drop of water at the bottom of a dried-up, weed-choked well".

== Allegations of antisemitism ==
Dickens has been accused of portraying antisemitic stereotypes because of his portrayal of the Jewish character Fagin in Oliver Twist. Paul Vallely writes that Fagin is widely seen as one of the most grotesque Jews in English literature, and one of the most vivid of Dickens's 989 characters. Nadia Valman, in Antisemitism: A Historical Encyclopedia of Prejudice and Persecution, argues that Fagin's representation was drawn from the image of the Jew as inherently evil, that the imagery associated him with the Devil, and with beasts.

The novel refers to Fagin 274 times in the first 38 chapters as "the Jew", while the ethnicity or religion of the other characters is rarely mentioned. In 1854, The Jewish Chronicle asked why "Jews alone should be excluded from the 'sympathizing heart' of this great author and powerful friend of the oppressed." Dickens (who had extensive knowledge of London street life and child exploitation) explained that he had made Fagin Jewish because "it unfortunately was true, of the time to which the story refers, that that class of criminal almost invariably was a Jew." It is widely believed that Fagin was based on a specific Jewish criminal of the era, Ikey Solomon. Dickens commented that by calling Fagin a Jew he had meant no imputation against the Jewish people, saying in a letter, "I have no feeling towards the Jews but a friendly one. I always speak well of them, whether in public or private, and bear my testimony (as I ought to do) to their perfect good faith in such transactions as I have ever had with them." Eliza Davis, whose husband had purchased Dickens's home in 1860 when he had put it up for sale, wrote to Dickens in protest at his portrayal of Fagin, arguing that he had "encouraged a vile prejudice against the despised Hebrew", and that he had done a great wrong to the Jewish people. While Dickens first reacted defensively upon receiving Davis's letter, he then halted the printing of Oliver Twist, and changed the text for the parts of the book that had not been set, which explains why after the first 38 chapters Fagin is barely called "the Jew" at all in the next 179 references to him.

== Reception ==
Contemporary reviewers including John Forster and the Literary Gazette praised the book for its realistic depiction of social conditions. However, others such as Richard Ford considered it an exaggeration of poverty.

== Audio recordings ==
Dickens's novel has been recorded many times as an audiobook. Notable recordings include:

- An audio dramatization titled The Adventures of Oliver Twist And Fagin starring Basil Rathbone as both The Narrator and Fagin was released by Columbia Masterworks Records (MM-700) in a 3-disc 75rpm set in 1947. This was later re-released by Columbia Records in 33 rpm format in 1955 (CL 674) and again in 1977 (P13902).
- Decca Records released an abridged recording of the novel narrated by James Mason (DL 9107) in 1962.
- Anthony Quayle narrated Chapters One, Two, Eight and Nine of the novel on a Caedmon Records recording (TC 1484) released in 1976.
- Paul Scofield narrated an abridged version in 1987 for Dove Audio.
- An abridged version narrated by Martin Jarvis was released on audio cassette in 1994, later on CD, as part of the Talking Classics series (TC NCC 004) by Orbis. Mr. Jarvis later narrated an unabridged version in 2006 for Audible Studios.
- Alex Jennings narrated an abridged version in 1995 for Penguin Audiobooks.
- Miriam Margolyes narrated an unabridged version in 2005 for Blackstone Audio.
- Gerald Dickens, the great-great-grandson of Charles Dickens, narrated an unabridged version in 2011.
- Jonathan Pryce narrated an unabridged version in 2019 for Audible Studios as part of The Audible Dickens Collection.

== Film, television, radio and theatrical adaptations ==
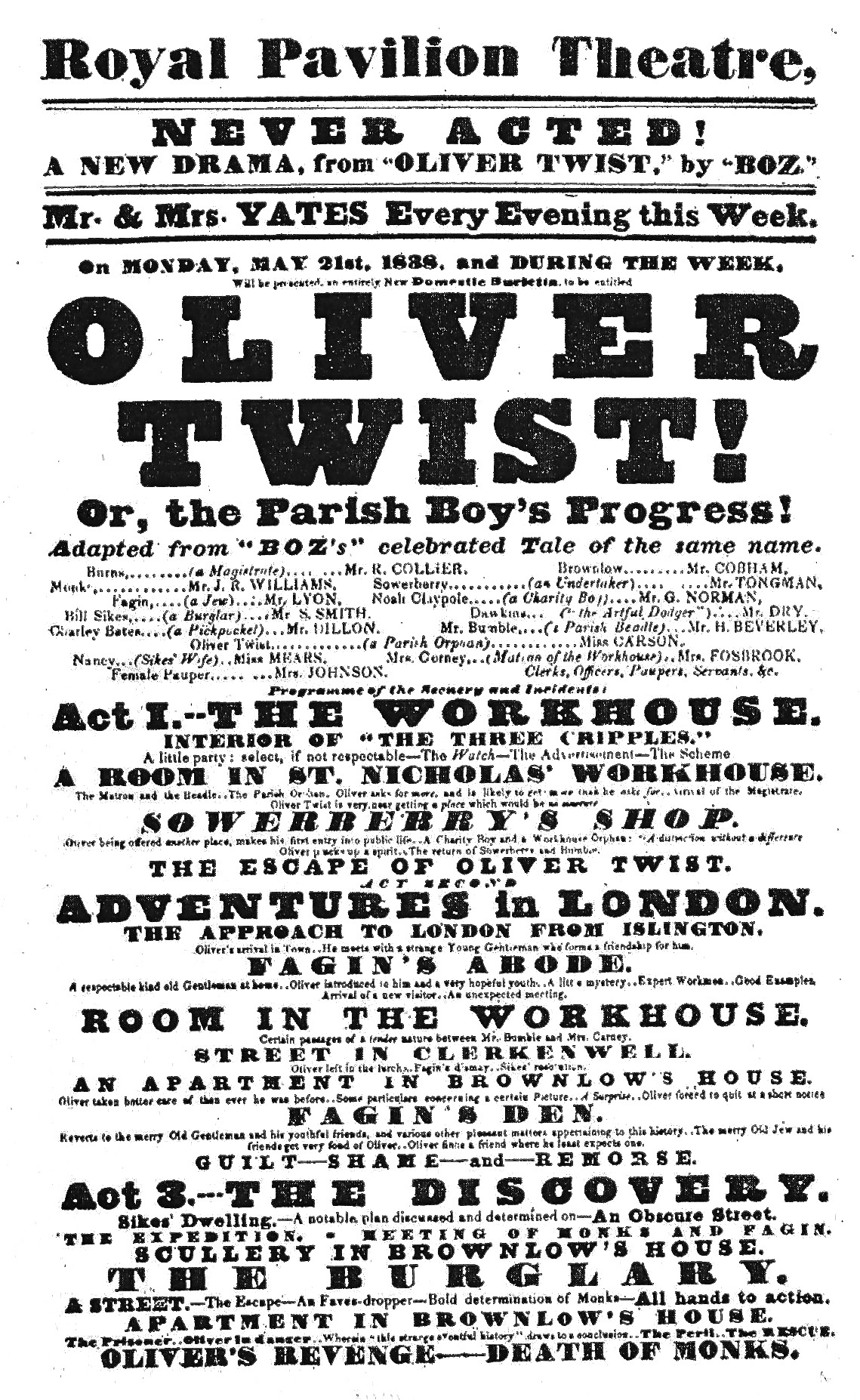
The earliest known playbill of a production of Oliver Twist. Marylebone Theatre, 1838

=== Film ===
- Oliver Twist (1909), the first adaptation of Dickens's novel, a silent film starring Edith Storey and Elita Proctor Otis.
- Oliver Twist (1912), a British silent film adaptation, directed by Thomas Bentley.
- Oliver Twist (1912), an American silent film adaptation starring Nat C. Goodwin.
- Oliver Twist (1916), a silent film adaptation, starring Marie Doro and Tully Marshall.
- Oliver Twist (1919), a silent Hungarian film adaptation.
- Oliver Twist (1922), a silent film adaptation featuring Lon Chaney and Jackie Coogan.
- Oliver Twist (1933), the first sound production of the novel.
- Oliver Twist (1948), directed by David Lean and starring Alec Guinness as Fagin.
- Manik (1961), a Bengali film directed by Bijalibaran Sen, and starring Pahari Sanyal, Chhabi Biswas, Sombhu Mitra and Tripti Mitra.
- Oliver! (1968), a British musical adaptation, winner in the Best Picture category at the 41st Academy Awards.
- Oliver Twist (1974), an animated film co-written by Ben Starr.
- Oliver Twist (1982), an Australian animated film.
- Las Aventuras de Oliver Twist (1987), a Mexican animated film.
- Oliver & Company (1988), a Disney full-length animated feature (also based on Victor Hugo's Les Misérables) which resets the tales to modern-day New York City, with Oliver (voiced by Joey Lawrence) portrayed as an orphaned kitten, the Dodger as a street-wise terrier mongrel (voiced by Billy Joel), and Fagin (voiced by Dom DeLuise) as a homeless tramp who lives on the docks with his pack of stray dogs that he trains to steal so he can survive and repay his debt to loan shark Sykes (voiced by Robert Loggia).
- Twisted (1996), an independent film directed by Seth Michael Donsky, starring Billy Porter and William Hickey, which sets the story to the gay underground subculture of New York City in the 1990s.
- Oliver Twist (1997), directed by Tony Bill and starring Richard Dreyfuss as Fagin and Elijah Wood as the Dodger.
- Twist (2003), an independent film loosely based on the novel, as it tells the tale not from Oliver's point of view, but from the Dodger.
- Boy Called Twist (2004), a South African movie which resets the story to modern-day Cape Town and turns Fagin into an Ethiopian Rastafarian.
- Oliver Twist (2005), directed by Roman Polanski and starring Barney Clark as Oliver and Ben Kingsley as Fagin.
- Twist (2021), a modern-day version directed by Martin Owen, and starring Michael Caine as Fagin, with Lena Headey and Rita Ora cast as female renditions of Bill Sikes and the Dodger respectively.

=== Television ===
- 1962: Oliver Twist, a 13-episode BBC serial directed by Eric Tayler, starring Max Adrian as Fagin, Willoughby Goddard as Mr Bumble and Peter Vaughan as Bill Sikes.
- 1980: The Further Adventures of Oliver Twist, a British television series set as a sequel, with Daniel Murray as Oliver, John Fowler as The Artful Dodger and David Swift as Fagin.
- 1982: Oliver Twist, a TV movie directed by Clive Donner, starring George C. Scott as Fagin and Tim Curry as Bill Sikes.
- 1985: Oliver Twist, a 12-episode BBC One drama directed by Gareth Davies, starring Eric Porter and Michael Attwell.
- 1996–97: Saban's Adventures of Oliver Twist, a 52-episode animated American-French co-production where the story is downplayed for younger viewers, in which Oliver loses his mother in a crowd rather than being dead and the characters are represented by anthropomorphic animals. Oliver in this version is a young dog.
- 1999: Oliver Twist, an ITV drama adaptation starring Andy Serkis and Keira Knightley.
- 2001: Escape of the Artful Dodger, an Australian TV series set as a sequel, where Dodger and Oliver are sent to the colony of Australia.
- 2007: Oliver Twist, a 5-episode BBC One drama directed by Coky Giedroyc, starring Timothy Spall, Julian Rhind-Tutt, Edward Fox, Anna Massey and Tom Hardy.
- 2020: The Animaniacs 2020 revival featured a two-part parody of the story titled "Wakkiver Twist" in season 2, featuring Yakko, Wakko, and Dot Warner playing the roles of a trio version of Oliver while Fagin is played by the Warners' usual foil, Dr. Otto von Scratchansniff.
- 2022: Dodger, a British TV series produced for CBBC, set as a prequel, where Dodger joins Fagin's gang.
- 2023: The Artful Dodger, an Australian TV series produced for Disney+, a sequel where Dodger is sent to the colony of Australia, starring Thomas Brodie-Sangster.

=== Radio ===
- 1928, BBC Liverpool, with Olive Worthington (Oliver Twist), J.P. Lambe (Fagin), Walter Shore (The Artful Dodger), Mrs Fred Wilkinson (Nancy) and Philip H. Harper (Bill Sikes)
- 1934, BBC Regional Programme, adapted by J. Comyns Carr, with Desmond Tester (Oliver Twist), Harcourt Williams (Fagin), Frederick Peisley (The Artful Dodger), Barbara Couper (Nancy) and Matthew Boulton (Bill Sikes)
- 1941–42, BBC Home Service in 8 parts, adapted by Audrey Lucas, with David Baxter (Oliver Twist), Malcolm Keen (Fagin), Leonard Thorne (The Artful Dodger), Belle Chrystall (Nancy) and Allan Jeaves (Bill Sikes)
- 1947, NBC Radio, Favorite Story, broadcast 29 April 1947, hosted by Ronald Colman with Henry Blair, Arthur Q. Bryan, Gloria Gordon, Edmund MacDonald, Peter Rankin and Virginia Gregg
- 1952, BBC Home Service in 12 parts, adapted by Giles Cooper, with Wilfrid Downing (Oliver Twist), John Gabriel (Fagin), Brian Smith (The Artful Dodger), Helen Shingler (Nancy) and Ralph Truman (Bill Sikes)
- 1970, BBC Radio 4 in 12 parts, adapted Giles Cooper, with Stephen Bone (Oliver Twist), Peter Woodthorpe (Fagin), Dennis Conoley (The Artful Dodger), Patricia Leventon (Nancy) and John Hollis (Bill Sikes)
- 1994, BBC Radio 4 in 6 parts, adapted and directed by Nigel Bryant, with Edward Long (Oliver Twist), John Grillo (Fagin), Richard Pearce (The Artful Dodger), Adjoa Andoh (Nancy) and Tim McInnerny (Bill Sikes)
- 2012, Focus on the Family Radio Theatre produced a dramatized version of the story with Joseph Holgate (Oliver Twist), Henry Goodman (Fagin), Lee Boardman (Bil Sikes), Honeysuckle Weeks (Nancy), and Geoffrey Palmer (Mr. Brownlow)

=== Theatre ===
- In 1838 Charles Zachary Barnett's adaptation, the three-act burletta Oliver Twist; or, The Parish Boy's Progress opened at the Marylebone Theatre in London.
- Oliver!, a 1960 West End theatre stage musical adaptation by Lionel Bart. The original cast featured Ron Moody as Fagin (he would reprise the role for the film adaptation), and boys who alternated in the juvenile lead of the Artful Dodger included Phil Collins and Davy Jones. Many songs are well known to the public, such as "Food, Glorious Food", "Consider Yourself" and "I'd Do Anything".
- Neil Bartlett's 2004 adaptation, originally performed at the Lyric Hammersmith, is almost entirely composed of phrases taken directly from Dickens's original text.
- Oliver Twist is a 2017 stage adaptation of the novel written by Anya Reiss which premiered at the Regent's Park Theatre. The show was directed by Caroline Byrne.
- In 2025, a musical adaptation of Oliver Twist premiered at the Teatro La Latina in Madrid, with a book and lyrics by Pedro Víllora and music by Gerardo Gardelin.

== See also ==
- Charles Dickens bibliography
- Child labour
