= You've Got to Pick a Pocket or Two =

Song

Song
- Released: 1960
- Songwriter: Lionel Bart

"You've Got to Pick a Pocket or Two" is a song from the Tony Award-winning British musical Oliver!, and the 1968 Academy Award-winning film Oliver! based on the 1838 novel Oliver Twist by Charles Dickens. The musical was penned by Lionel Bart, and was first shown in London's West End in 1960.

== Background ==
The song is sung in Fagin's lair in a scene based on the section of Dickens's book where Fagin (played by Ron Moody in the film) teaches Oliver Twist and the rest of the boys how to pick the pockets of gentlemen so as to be able to steal their handkerchiefs, etc., without being detected. It is the first song in Act I Scene VI.

Fagin and the boys loosely dangle various "hankies" from their pockets while dancing around the room and doing gymnastics to show Oliver how easy it is to steal one without it being noticed.

Although less pronounced than "Reviewing the Situation", this song has a Jewish melody.

This song is sampled in the 2004 song "Large Amounts" by Ludacris, from the album "The Red Light District".

The time signature of this song is 4/4, and it is in the key of F minor.
