= As Long as He Needs Me =

Song

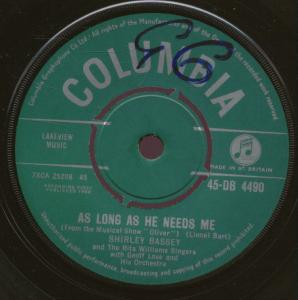

Single by Shirley Bassey
- B-side: "So in Love"
- Released: 1960
- Genre: Popular music
- Label: Columbia
- Songwriter(s): Lionel Bart

Shirley Bassey singles chronology
"The Birth of the Blues" (1960)	"As Long as He Needs Me" (1960)	"You'll Never Know" (1961)

"As Long as He Needs Me" is a torch song sung by the character of Nancy in the 1960 musical Oliver! and written by Lionel Bart. Georgia Brown, who was the first actress to play Nancy, introduced the song. It is a love ballad expressing Nancy's love for her criminal boyfriend Bill Sikes despite his mistreatment of her. In the film adaptation of the musical, it was sung by Shani Wallis.

A reprise of this song towards the end of the show expresses Nancy's affection for young Oliver Twist, implying that she now feels that the child also needs her. This reprise was omitted from the film version.

Its popularity grew by virtue of renditions by several popular singers, including Shirley Bassey who reached number two for five weeks on the United Kingdom charts with the song.

The song has been covered by male artists under the title "As Long as She Needs Me". One such version was recorded by Sammy Davis Jr. in 1963, reaching number 19 on the Billboard Easy Listening chart.
