= Consider Yourself =

Song from the 1960 musical Oliver!

"Consider Yourself" is a song from the 1960 original West End and Broadway musical Oliver! and the 1968 film of the same name. It was introduced on Broadway by Davy Jones and the ensemble. In the 1968 film version, it is performed in the market and led by Jack Wild's Artful Dodger. In all versions, Dodger sings it when he first meets Oliver, after offering to get the destitute and alone boy food and lodging. Lyrically, it is an enthusiastic gift of friendship from Dodger and his as-yet-unseen gang to Oliver, assuring him warmly he can consider himself "our mate" and "one of the family" as "it's clear we're going to get along". The 1968 film builds it to a spectacular extended song-and-dance routine involving the street crowd, market workers, policemen and chimney sweep boys.

== In popular culture ==
- This song was sung in the 1969 premiere episode of Sesame Street.
- It was broadcast on the BBC (to some criticism) on November 14th 1973 during coverage of the marriage of Princess Anne (now the Princess Royal) to her first husband Mark Phillips, to ‘welcome him into the royal family’
- In October 1975, this song was adapted into Japanese to welcome Emperor Hirohito at Central Park, New York City.
- In 1977, the song was sung by The Muppets on the seventh episode of the second season of The Muppet Show to its guest star Edgar Bergen and his dummy, Charlie McCarthy.
- A rearranged version of the song was used as the theme of the ITV sitcom Home to Roost.
- The first couple lines of the song were sung by Carlton Banks and the Alagaroos in the 13th episode of the 1st season of The Fresh Prince of Bel-Air.
- In Christmas 2011, BBC One used famous celebrities to sing the song for promotion.
- During the COVID-19 pandemic a rewritten version of the song was aired during trailer breaks in CBBC and CBeebies programming, sung by cast members and presenters of TV shows aired on both channels and the objective of the song was wishing viewers well during national lockdown. The tagline was "consider yourself part of our family".
- A parody of the song titled "Conceive of Yourself" appears in the 2nd season of the 2020 reboot of Animaniacs, in the episode "Wakkiver Twist: Part 2", which itself is a parody of Oliver!
- Part of the song is sung by Detective Charles Boyle (portrayed by Joe Lo Truglio) in the season 1 episode of Brooklyn 99 titled "M.E. Time."
