= Food, Glorious Food =

1960 song with lyrics by Lionel Bart

"Food, Glorious Food", written by Lionel Bart, is the opening song from the 1960s West End and Broadway musical (and 1968 film) Oliver!.

== Musical theme ==
The song is sung from the point of view of the children in a workhouse for orphans where they are forced to work to “earn their keep”, and deprived of proper nutrition while the administrators feast on delicacies. The children arrive for breakfast fantasizing about delicious food such as sausage and mustard, and sweets including jelly and custard. When the workhouse boys arrive at the front of the serving line they receive only tasteless gruel from the staff. The song is intended as a metaphor for keeping hope alive, despite being mistreated.

== Ice Age: The Meltdown version ==
A version of the song appeared in the 2006 animated film Ice Age: The Meltdown.
