= Oliver! (film) =

1968 British musical drama film

- British theatrical release poster
- Directed by: Carol Reed
- Screenplay by: Vernon Harris
- Based on: Oliver! (1960 musical) by Lionel Bart; Oliver Twist (1837 novel) by Charles Dickens
- Produced by: John Woolf
- Starring: Ron Moody; Oliver Reed; Harry Secombe; Shani Wallis; Mark Lester; Jack Wild
- Cinematography: Oswald Morris
- Edited by: Ralph Kemplen
- Music by: Lionel Bart (music and lyrics); John Green (music score)
- Production company: Romulus Films
- Distributed by: Columbia Pictures
- Release date: 26 September 1968
- Running time: 153 minutes
- Country: United Kingdom
- Language: English
- Budget: $10 million
- Box office: $40 million

Oliver! is a 1968 British period musical drama film directed by Carol Reed from a screenplay by Vernon Harris, based on Lionel Bart's 1960 stage musical, itself an adaptation of Charles Dickens's 1838 novel Oliver Twist. It stars Mark Lester in the title role, along with Ron Moody, Oliver Reed, Harry Secombe, Shani Wallis and Jack Wild.

Filmed at Shepperton Film Studio in Surrey, the film was a Romulus production by John Woolf and was distributed worldwide by Columbia Pictures. It includes such musical numbers as "Food, Glorious Food", "Consider Yourself", "As Long as He Needs Me", "I'd Do Anything", "You've Got to Pick a Pocket or Two", and "Where Is Love?".

At the 41st Academy Awards for 1968, Oliver! was nominated for eleven Academy Awards and won six, including Best Picture (the last G-rated movie to win the award to this day), Best Director for Reed, and an Honorary Award for choreographer Onna White. At the 26th Golden Globe Awards, the film won two Golden Globes: Best Motion Picture – Musical or Comedy and Best Actor – Musical or Comedy for Ron Moody. The British Film Institute ranked Oliver! the 77th-greatest British film of the 20th century. In 2017, a poll of 150 actors, directors, writers, producers and critics for Time Out magazine ranked Oliver! the 69th-best British film ever.

== Plot ==
At a workhouse in Dunstable, orphans are served their daily gruel. Some boys draw lots, with Oliver drawing the tangled one, forcing him to approach Mr. Bumble and Widow Corney to ask for more gruel. Enraged, Bumble takes Oliver to the governors for punishment and then parades him through the streets to sell him as an apprentice. Mr. Sowerberry, an undertaker, purchases Oliver. Sowerberry's other apprentice, Noah Claypole, later insults Oliver's mother; Oliver retaliates and is imprisoned in the cellar. He discovers that the window grate is unlocked and escapes.

A week later, Oliver reaches London. He meets the Artful Dodger, who takes him under his wing. Dodger brings Oliver to a hideout for young pickpockets led by Fagin, who instructs the gang in the art of stealing. Fagin later meets with burglar Bill Sikes by the tavern. When Fagin returns to the hideout, he goes through a secret cache of treasures. Oliver wakes up, notices Fagin's secret, and startles him. Fagin explains that the trove is to help him in his old age.

In the morning, Sikes's girlfriend Nancy arrives at the hideout to collect his money. Fagin sends the boys out for the day, teaming Oliver with Dodger and Charley Bates. At a bookstall, Dodger steals a wallet from the wealthy Mr. Brownlow, who mistakes Oliver for the thief and has police arrest him. At the court hearing, the bookseller Mr. Jessop testifies that Oliver is innocent. Brownlow takes Oliver in, while Sikes and Fagin send Dodger to follow them.

Oliver has been living with Mr. Brownlow for several days. Sikes and Fagin are determined to get him back, as they believe Oliver may tell on them; Sikes forces Nancy into helping, as Oliver trusts her the most. The next day, Brownlow entrusts Oliver with a delivery for the bookshop. As he leaves, Brownlow notices a striking resemblance between Oliver and a portrait of his long-lost niece Emily. While walking through London, Oliver is sidetracked by Nancy, kidnapped by Sikes, and taken back to the hideout. Sikes is defied by Oliver, who in turn is protected by Nancy. When Fagin warns Sikes to remain calm, Sikes—taking Fagin by the scruff of the neck, nearly in a chokehold— threatens his life if their operation is compromised. Realising Sikes's violent nature, Fagin begins reconsidering his life as a thief but decides to keep to his old ways.

Bumble and Corney visit Brownlow after he begins searching for Oliver's origin. They present a locket belonging to Oliver's mother, who arrived at the workhouse penniless and died during childbirth. Brownlow recognizes the locket as Emily's, making Oliver his great-nephew, and throws the two out for keeping the trinket and information until they could collect a reward for it. Meanwhile, Sikes forces Oliver to take part in a house robbery. The robbery fails when Oliver accidentally awakens the occupants, but he and Sikes get away. While they are gone, Nancy, fearful for Oliver's life, goes to Brownlow, confessing her part in Oliver's kidnapping; however, she refuses to name Bill out of loyalty. She promises to return Oliver to Brownlow at midnight at London Bridge. She then goes to the tavern. When Sikes and Oliver appear, Sikes has his dog Bullseye guard the boy. Nancy starts up a lively drinking song as a diversion, but Bullseye alerts Sikes, and he gives chase.

As Oliver and Nancy depart at London Bridge, Sikes catches up to them and violently bludgeons Nancy to death. Sikes takes off with Oliver, but Bullseye turns coat on his master and returns to where Nancy has succumbed to her injuries and alerts the police. The dog leads Brownlow and an angry mob to the thieves' hideout. Sikes arrives there and demands money, as well as confessing that he killed Nancy. Upon seeing the approaching mob, the thieves disband and flee. Sikes runs off with Oliver, using him as a hostage. During the evacuation, Fagin loses his prized possessions, which sink into mud. Sikes attempts to flee to an adjacent roof, but is shot dead by the police. Fagin makes up his mind to change his ways, but Dodger appears with a stolen wallet. The two dance off into the sunrise together, happily determined to live out the rest of their days as thieves, while Oliver returns to Brownlow's home to be adopted.

== Cast ==
- Mark Lester as Oliver Twist
- Ron Moody as Fagin
- Jack Wild as Artful Dodger
- Oliver Reed as Bill Sikes
- Shani Wallis as Nancy
- Harry Secombe as Mr. Bumble
- Joseph O'Conor as Mr. Brownlow
- Hugh Griffith as the Magistrate
- Peggy Mount as Mrs. Bumble
- Leonard Rossiter as Mr. Sowerberry
- Hylda Baker as Mrs. Sowerberry
- Kenneth Cranham as Noah Claypole
- Megs Jenkins as Mrs. Bedwin
- Sheila White as Bet
- Wensley Pithey as Dr. Grimwig
- James Hayter as Mr. Jessop
- Elizabeth Knight as Charlotte
- Fred Emney as Chairman of the Workhouse
- Joe Cornelius as Man in Crowd
- Butch as Bullseye
- Robert Bartlett, Graham Buttrose, Geoffrey Chandler, Kirk Clugston, Dempsey Cook, Christopher Duff, Nigel Grice, Ronnie Johnson, Nigel Kingsley, Robert Langley, Brian Lloyd, Peter Lock, Clive Moss, Ian Ramsey, Peter Renn, Billy Smith, Kim Smith, Oliver Hancock, Freddie Stead, Raymond Ward and John Watters as Fagin's Boys.

== Production ==
The movie was developed by producer James Woolf and director Lewis Gilbert. Woolf died and his brother John took over. Gilbert had to go on to another film and Carol Reed stepped in as director.

=== Casting ===
The film used mostly young unknowns, among them Mark Lester (Oliver), Shani Wallis (Nancy) and Jack Wild as Artful Dodger, but also featured Hugh Griffith, an Oscar winner for Ben-Hur, in the role of the Magistrate. Harry Secombe, who played Mr. Bumble, was well known in Britain but not in the United States, and Oliver Reed, who played Bill Sikes, had just begun to make a name for himself. Producer John Woolf suggested Oliver Reed for the role to the director Carol Reed, without knowing that the two were, in fact, related as nephew and uncle respectively. Many felt that the role of Nancy should have gone to Georgia Brown, who had played the role in the West End production. Classical actor Joseph O'Conor, not well known in the U.S., played Mr. Brownlow.

Ron Moody later told an interviewer that when it was first proposed that he play Fagin, he felt that character was "pretty vicious and unpleasant; I didn't want to do that. I didn't want to perpetuate what I considered to be an unfair, unpleasant image of Jewish people." He came to realize "that the only way to play Fagin was to forget Dickens and create a clown and I used every trick I could think of to take Fagin away from Dickens's concept and to bring it into more of an entertainment situation."

=== Shooting ===
Filming at Shepperton Studios commenced on 23 June 1967.

=== Music ===
The soundtrack is similar to the original play, although without Bill Sikes's song "My Name", the song "I Shall Scream", featuring Mr. Bumble and Mrs. Corney, and the song featuring Mr. Bumble and Mr. and Mrs. Sowerberry, "That's Your Funeral".

== Reception ==
=== Box office ===
The film earned $10.5 million in theatrical rentals at the US and Canadian box office, earning $40 million worldwide. In the United Kingdom, the film played for 90 weeks at the Leicester Square Theatre in London, grossing $1,992,000. It had been seen by 5 million people across the country at that time.

=== Critical response ===
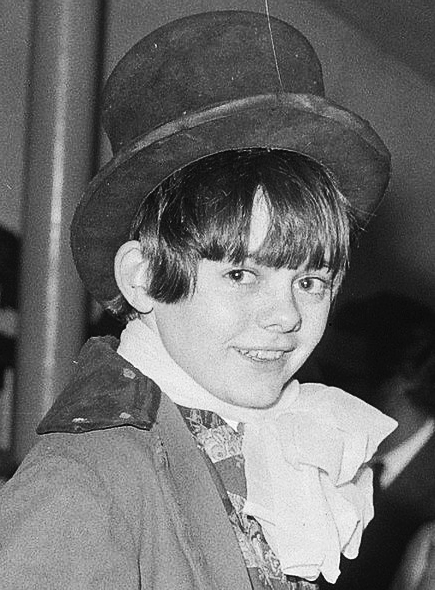
The performance of Jack Wild received critical acclaim and earned the 16-year-old actor a nomination for the Academy Award for Best Actor in a Supporting Role. He is, as of 2026, the fourth-youngest nominee in the category.

Oliver! received widespread acclaim from critics. It was hailed by Pauline Kael in her review published in The New Yorker as being one of the few film versions of a stage musical that was superior to the original show, which she suggested she had walked out on. "The musical numbers emerge from the story with a grace that has been rarely seen since the musicals of René Clair."

Roger Ebert of the Chicago Sun-Times awarded the film four out of four stars. "Sir Carol Reed's Oliver! is a treasure of a movie," he wrote. "It is very nearly universal entertainment, one of those rare films like The Wizard of Oz that appeals in many ways to all sorts of people. It will be immediately exciting to the children, I think, because of the story and the unforgettable Dickens characters. Adults will like it for the sweep and zest of its production. And as a work of popular art, it will stand the test of time, I guess. It is as well-made as a film can be." He particularly admired Carol Reed's working relationship with the children in the film: "Not for a moment, I suspect, did Reed imagine he had to talk down to the children in his audience. Not for a moment are the children in the cast treated as children. They're equal participants in the great adventure, and they have to fend for themselves or bloody well get out of the way. This isn't a watered-down lollypop. It's got bite and malice along with... romance and humor." Although he stated that the film's roadshow presentation was a minor problem for children, who are not used to long films, he praised the production design, musical adaptation score, and casting and acting, particularly that of Ron Moody and Jack Wild. He concluded, "Oliver! succeeds finally because of its taste. It never stoops for cheap effects and never insults our intelligence. And because we can trust it, we can let ourselves go with it, and we do. It is a splendid experience." He later named the film as the seventh-best film of 1968.

John Simon wrote "Oliver is a nice, big movie musical [about] which it is hard to say anything of special interest to the reader or even to oneself."

The Philadelphia Inquirer was enthusiastic: "There's atmosphere and airy grace to 'Oliver!.' It has catchy, sometimes beautiful songs and the voices to go with them. It rarely stops moving and it has the touch of melodramatic excitement... a prancing musical film which by reason of its stagecraft and performance is more exhilarating than it was on the stage, better rounded in its 'free' adaptation."

On review aggregator Rotten Tomatoes, the film holds an approval rating of 90% based on 79 reviews, with an average score of 8/10; the critics' consensus reads: "Oliver! transforms Charles Dickens's muckraking novel into a jaunty musical Victorian fairytale, buoyed by Ron Moody's charming star turn and Onna White's rapturous choreography."

At his death in 2015, The Forward said that Moody succeeded in transforming "a viciously anti-Semitic literary portrait into a joyous musical onscreen image."

=== Accolades ===
Oliver!, along with Columbia Pictures' other Best Picture nominee Funny Girl, secured a combined total of 19 Academy Award nominations, the most nominations for musicals from one studio in a year.

Oliver! was the last G-rated film to win the Academy Award for Best Picture. It was the last movie musical to win the award, until Chicago in 2002 (there have been other musicals nominated such as Hello, Dolly!, Fiddler on the Roof, Cabaret, All That Jazz, Beauty and the Beast and Moulin Rouge!). Oliver! also had the distinction of being the last British film to win Best Picture until Chariots of Fire in 1981.

In 2017, a poll of 150 actors, directors, writers, producers and critics for Time Out magazine ranked Oliver! the 69th-best British film ever.

| Award | Category | Nominee(s) | Result | Ref. |
|---|---|---|---|---|
| Academy Awards | Best Picture | John Woolf | Won | |
| Academy Awards | Best Director | Carol Reed | Won | |
| Academy Awards | Best Actor | Ron Moody | Nominated | |
| Academy Awards | Best Supporting Actor | Jack Wild | Nominated | |
| Academy Awards | Best Screenplay – Based on Material from Another Medium | Vernon Harris | Nominated | |
| Academy Awards | Best Art Direction | Art Direction: John Box and Terence Marsh; Set Decoration: Vernon Dixon and Ken Muggleston | Won | |
| Academy Awards | Best Cinematography | Oswald Morris | Nominated | |
| Academy Awards | Best Costume Design | Phyllis Dalton | Nominated | |
| Academy Awards | Best Film Editing | Ralph Kemplen | Nominated | |
| Academy Awards | Best Score of a Musical Picture – Original or Adaptation | Johnny Green | Won | |
| Academy Awards | Best Sound | Buster Ambler, John Cox, Jim Groom, Bob Jones (sound engineer), and Tony Dawe | Won | |
| Academy Awards | Honorary Academy Award | Onna White | Honoured | |
| American Cinema Editors Awards | Best Edited Feature Film | Ralph Kemplen | Nominated | |
| British Academy Film Awards | Best Film | Carol Reed | Nominated | |
| British Academy Film Awards | Best Direction | Carol Reed | Nominated | |
| British Academy Film Awards | Best Actor in a Leading Role | Ron Moody | Nominated | |
| British Academy Film Awards | Best Costume Design | Phyllis Dalton | Nominated | |
| British Academy Film Awards | Best Editing | Ralph Kemplen | Nominated | |
| British Academy Film Awards | Best Production Design | John Box | Nominated | |
| British Academy Film Awards | Best Sound | John Cox and Bob Jones | Nominated | |
| British Academy Film Awards | Most Promising Newcomer to Leading Film Roles | Jack Wild | Nominated | |
| Directors Guild of America Awards | Outstanding Directorial Achievement in Motion Pictures | Carol Reed | Nominated | |
| Golden Globe Awards | Best Motion Picture – Musical or Comedy | | Won | |
| Golden Globe Awards | Best Actor in a Motion Picture – Musical or Comedy | Ron Moody | Won | |
| Golden Globe Awards | Best Supporting Actor – Motion Picture | Hugh Griffith | Nominated | |
| Golden Globe Awards | Best Director – Motion Picture | Carol Reed | Nominated | |
| Golden Globe Awards | Most Promising Newcomer – Male | Jack Wild | Nominated | |
| Laurel Awards | Top Musical | | Won | |
| Laurel Awards | Top Male New Face | Mark Lester | Nominated | |
| Laurel Awards | Top Male New Face | Ron Moody | Nominated | |
| Laurel Awards | Top Female New Face | Shani Wallis | Nominated | |
| Moscow International Film Festival | Special Prize | Carol Reed | Won | |
| Moscow International Film Festival | Best Actor | Ron Moody | Won | |
| National Board of Review Awards | Top Ten Films | | 9th Place | |
| New York Film Critics Circle Awards | Best Film | | Nominated | |
| New York Film Critics Circle Awards | Best Director | Carol Reed | Nominated | |
| Sant Jordi Awards | Best Performance in a Foreign Film | Ron Moody | Won | |

== Preservation ==
The Academy Film Archive preserved Oliver! in 1998.

== Home video ==
Commencing in the US in 1998, Oliver! has been released worldwide on DVD by Columbia TriStar Home Entertainment and its successor Sony Pictures Home Entertainment. The US DVD has the film, complete with its original overture and entr'acte music, spread across two sides of a double-sided disc, separated at the intermission. Everywhere else, it was issued on a single-sided disc.

Since 2013, it has been released on Blu-Ray in several countries by Sony, with the US having an additional limited edition release by Twilight Time.
