= WJY =

WJY may refer to:

- WJY (New Jersey), a temporary radio station used to broadcast the July 2, 1921 Dempsey-Carpentier heavyweight boxing match
- WJY (New York City), a radio station licensed to the Radio Corporation of America from 1923 to 1927
