= WVP =

Longwave radio station in New York City (1922)

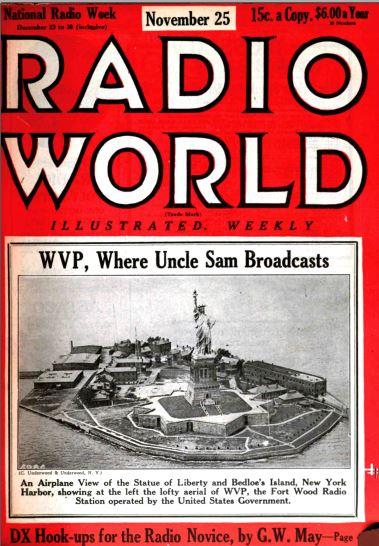
Cover of the November 25, 1922, issue of Radio World.

WVP (initially WYCB) was a longwave radio station, operated by the U.S. Army Signal Corps at Fort Wood on Bedloe's Island in New York Harbor. Although primarily used for official communication, in 1922 it provided nightly one-hour informational and entertainment broadcasts in conjunction with local civilian amateur radio enthusiasts.

Its operation inspired Madison Square Garden's Julius Hopp to approach the Radio Corporation of America for the establishment of a station to broadcast the "Fight of the Century" between Jack Dempsey and Georges Carpentier on July 2, 1921. It also featured, on April 4, 1922, the radio debut of commentator H. V. Kaltenborn.

WVP's public broadcasts were short-lived, and ceased by October 1922.

== History ==
The station was originally established to provide distant communication for the military. After the end of World War I, and dealing with budgetary constraints, a civilian Amateur Radio Reserve was formed by local amateur radio operators, using their stations to provide communication. In addition, this group started to use the Fort Wood station for nightly broadcasts.

In March 1921 Julius Hopp, manager of Madison Square Garden concerts, attended the amateur Second District Convention. One feature of this convention was that "music sent from the Bedloe Island Signal Corps Station via radiofone was heard almost continuously". This led to a joint effort with the Radio Corporation of America, which established temporary station WJY, used to broadcast, on July 2, 1921, the "Fight of the Century", Jack Dempsey vs. Georges Carpentier.

In February 1922, it was announced that the station, then known as WYCB, had inaugurated a nightly one-hour broadcast. The official statement read:

Although the broadcast proposition is not a new one, still the many features incorporated or proposed for incorporation in the broadcast programs of the Amateur Radio Reserve will in most cases be original and of vital interest. They will include educational and amusement details that will appeal to all interested radio men.

The Amateur Radio Reserve, 2d Corps Area, U. S. A., is an organization of high-class radio men with which the Signal Corps of the Army is co-operating to the greatest extent in transmitting educational information and assisting the amateur as far as possible. This organization is developing amateur station relay routes from the Fort Wood station to all stations of the Army for the purpose of forming a reliable and efficient network of amateur stations, capable of and actually carrying on official traffic, and, in addition, prepared to carry on the radio communication of the government when called upon by any governmental department.

The Amateur Radio Reserve, 2d Corps Area, U. S. A., is strictly a civilian organization, not obligated in any way to either military service, or military training other than obtaining for the benefit of the amateur the full benefits extended by the Signal Corps to all amateurs in a broader manner than might be obtained by the individual.

According to the amateur radio publication QST, the purpose of the cooperative venture was: "The development of interest among amateurs and the establishment of contact with them by this and other means, will, it is hoped, result among other things in making practicable the building up of a complete radio net of qualified amateur stations who can and will be willing to assist the regular Army radio net in the transmission of official business during emergency or otherwise."

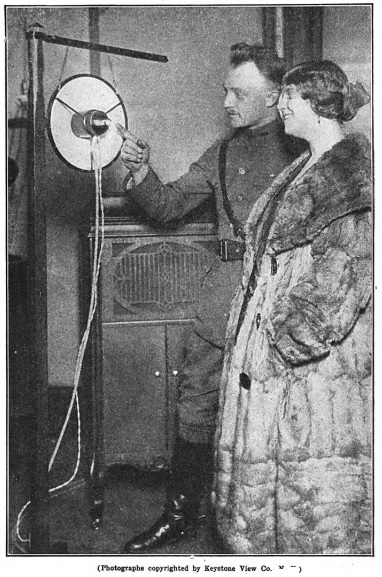
Lieutenant H. S. Paddock, officer in charge, with Margaret Walz, at station's "soup plate" microphone.

The station's call sign was changed from WYCB to WVP "at 1:00 A.M." on March 17, 1922. On April 4, 1922, WVP featured the radio debut of the associate editor of the Brooklyn Daily Eagle, H. V. Kaltenborn, reviewing "The Big News of the Week". In the April 1922 issue of Wireless Age, it was listed as one of the featured stations, with a schedule of "Evenings 9 to 9.55 o'clock, except Sundays and Holidays."

WVP was described as part of "The radiophone service of the future". However, effective December 1, 1921, the Department of Commerce had formally established a civilian entertainment broadcasting service, for stations operating on a wavelength of 360 meters (833 kHz). The following year saw a tremendous increase in the number of stations, exceeding 500 by the end of 1922, with the New York City region becoming a major center. In the March 1922 issue of Radio News, Armstrong Perry noted that "A list of all that can be heard with a radio receiver anywhere within three hundred miles of Greater New York would fill a book." By June, there were local stations providing almost continuous broadcasts every day on 360 meters, from 9:00 A.M. to midnight.

WVP had a major disadvantage, as listeners using their homemade sets encountered difficulties in switching from 360 meters, where most broadcasting stations existed, to WVP's longwave wavelength of 1450 meters. In addition, performers now found plenty of stations that welcomed them without requiring a boat trip to an isolated studio. The WVP entertainment broadcasts ended, and starting in October 1922, daily schedule reports in local newspapers now listed the station as "closed".
