= Oliver Twist (disambiguation) =

Oliver Twist is a novel by Charles Dickens.

Oliver Twist may also refer to:

- Oliver Twist (character), the protagonist of Dickens' novel

== Films ==
- Oliver Twist (1909 film), first adaptation of Dickens' novel, a silent film starring Edith Storey and Elita Proctor Otis
- Oliver Twist (1912 British film), a silent film adaptation, directed by Thomas Bentley
- Oliver Twist (1912 American film), a silent film adaptation starring Nat C. Goodwin
- Oliver Twist (1916 film), a silent film adaptation, starring Marie Doro and Tully Marshall
- Oliver Twist (1919 film), a silent Hungarian film adaptation
- Oliver Twist, Jr., a 1921 American silent drama film
- Oliver Twist (1922 film), silent film adaptation featuring Lon Chaney and Jackie Coogan
- Oliver Twist (1933 film), a film adaptation of Dickens' novel, and the first one with sound, starring Dickie Moore.
- Oliver Twist (1948 film), a film adaptation by David Lean, starring John Howard Davies.
- Oliver! (1968 film), a 1968 film adaptation directed by Carol Reed, based on the stage musical, adapted from the novel
- Oliver Twist (1974 film), an animation film co-written by Ben Starr
- Oliver Twist (1982 Australian film), an Australian animated film
- Oliver Twist (1982 TV film), a television movie adaptation starring Richard Charles and George C. Scott
- Oliver Twist (1997 film), a television movie adaptation
- Oliver Twist (2005 film), a film adaptation by Roman Polanski

== Television series ==
- Oliver Twist (1962 serial), a BBC television serial starring Bruce Prochnik and Max Adrian
- Oliver Twist (1985 serial), a British television serial starring Ben Rodska and Eric Porter
- Oliver Twist (1999 TV series), a TV serial adaptation starring Sam Smith and Robert Lindsay
- Oliver Twist (2007 TV series), a BBC television serial adaptation starring William Miller and Timothy Spall

=== Songs ===
- "Oliver Twist" (Vaughn De Leath song), 1921 written to accompany the 1922 silent film
- "Oliver Twist", song by Rod McKuen, written by Gladys Shelley and Rod McKuen 1962
- "Oliver Twist", song by Avey Tare from Down There
- "Oliver Twist" (D'banj song), 2012
- "Oliver Twist", a 2021 song by ArrDee from Pier Pressure

== Other uses ==
- Oliver Twist (Guthrie), a sculpture by Trace Guthrie in Hermann Park, Houston, Texas, US
- Oliver Twist Tobacco, a Scandinavian chewing tobacco brand by Hermann Krügers Eftf. A/S, Denmark
- Oliver Twist (play), a 1905 play by J. Comyns Carr, based on the novel

== See also ==
- Oliver's Twist, a television cooking show featuring Jamie Oliver
- "Oliver's Twist", a 1961 song by Bob Miller and the Millermen
- Variations of the name for other adaptations of Dickens' novel
