= Oliver and the Artful Dodger =

- Written by: Blanche Hanalis
- Directed by: Joseph Barbera; William Hanna
- Starring: Michael Bell; Lucille Bliss; Richard Dawson; Michael Evans; Pam Ferdin; Bernard Fox; Joan Gerber; Anna Lee; Ronald Long; Gary Marsh; Don Messick; Darryl Pollack; John Stephenson; Ngaire Thomson; Jon Walmsley
- Theme music composer: Hoyt Curtin; William Hanna; Joseph Barbera
- Country of origin: United States
- Original language: English

Production
- Producers: Joseph Barbera; William Hanna
- Running time: 90 minutes
- Production company: Hanna-Barbera Productions

Original release
- Network: ABC
- Release: October 21 – October 28, 1972

Related
- Willie Mays and the Say-Hey Kid; The Adventures of Robin Hoodnik

Oliver and the Artful Dodger is a 1972 American animated television film and a sequel to Charles Dickens' 1838 novel Oliver Twist. It was broadcast as part of The ABC Saturday Superstar Movie and originally aired in two parts on October 21 and 28, 1972.

== Plot ==
In 1860, Mr. Brownlow lies dying. In his final moments, he reveals to Oliver Twist that his will, leaving his entire estate to Oliver, is concealed in a secret drawer in his bedroom furniture. However, he dies before he can reveal its exact location. Overcome with grief, Oliver flees the house.

When he returns, he finds that, without the will, the estate has been awarded to Mr. Brownlow's only living relative- his criminal nephew Sam Sniperly. Sniperly has sold the house and the furniture. Homeless again, Oliver wanders the streets of London until he encounters his old friend the Artful Dodger, who has reformed from his previous criminal ways and now works as a costermonger to support a group of orphans that he has rescued from Mr. Bumble's workhouse.

Upon hearing of Oliver's predicament, he volunteers to help. They search for the furniture dealer who completed the sale and learn that it was sold to a Master Dreadly, to furnish his country manor. They decide to travel to the estate on foot to attempt to retrieve the will, but they're followed by Sniperly, who plans to destroy the will to preserve his claim.

== Cast ==
- Gary Marsh as Oliver Twist.
- Michael Bell as The Artful Dodger and Fishmonger.
- Richard Dawson as Sam Sniperly and Furniture Man.
- Michael Evans as Narrator.
- Pam Ferdin as Louisa and Lilibit.
- Bernard Fox as Doctor, Farmer, Constable, and Master Dreadly.
- Joan Gerber as Mrs. Puddy, Rose, Tess, and Old Hag.
- Anna Lee as Mrs. Grunch, Mistress Dreadly, Farmer's Wife, Old Crone.
- Ronald Long as Mr Bumble and Coachman.
- Don Messick as Pastry Cook, House Agent, Midget, Workman, and Hero.
- Darryl Pollack as Deacon, Happy Harry, and Twig.
- John Stephenson as Mr. Brownlow, Mr. Grunch, Goodfriend, Butcher, and Mr. Highbottle.
- Jon Walmsley as Flip and Boy.
- Lucille Bliss as Additional Characters.
- Ngaire Thomson as Additional Characters.

== Home media ==
Oliver and the Artful Dodger was released on VHS. It is available on DVD as part of Warner Archive's Hanna-Barbera Specials Collection set, released September 15, 2015.

== See also ==
- List of works produced by Hanna-Barbera
- Oliver Twist (disambiguation)
