= Edouard Trebaol =

American actor

Edouard Vincent Trebaol
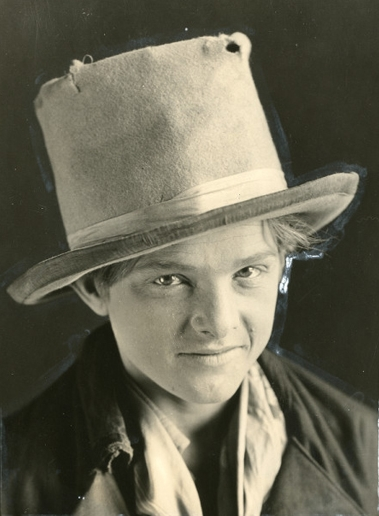
- Trebaol as "The Artful Dodger"
- Born: 20 May 1905; Los Angeles, California, U.S.
- Died: 10 October 1935 (aged 30); Culver City, California, U.S.
- Occupation: Actor
- Years active: 1919–1923

Edouard Trebaol (20 May 1905 – 11 October 1935) was an American actor.

== Biography ==
Trebaol was the son of French immigrants. There were a total of 13 children in the Trebaol family, all of whom are believed to have acted in Hollywood during the silent era. Their mother worked as an extra. Trebaol appeared in at least eight films between 1919 and 1923, first appearing as an orphan in the 1919 adventure film Jinx. His most notable role was as the Artful Dodger in Oliver Twist (1922) starring Jackie Coogan and Lon Chaney. His last film appearance was in the 1923 Ruth Roland serial, Haunted Valley.

He later became an electrician in a Culver City studio, dying from a fall at the studio on 10 October 1935. One of his brothers, Reverend Herve Trebaol of Ontario, performed the service.

== Filmography ==
- Jinx (1919)
- The Penalty (1920)
- Honest Hutch (1920)
- Get-Rich-Quick Edgar (1920)
- Edgar's Feast Day (1921)
- Edgar the Detective (1921)
- Oliver Twist (1922)
- Haunted Valley (1923)

== Bibliography ==
- John Holmstrom, The Moving Picture Boy: An International Encyclopaedia from 1895 to 1995, Norwich, Michael Russell, 1996, p. 25.
