= WDT (New York City) =

Radio station in New York City (1921–1923)

WDT was a short-lived AM broadcasting station licensed to the Ship Owners Radio Service in New York City, which was issued its first license in December 1921, and deleted two years later.

== History ==
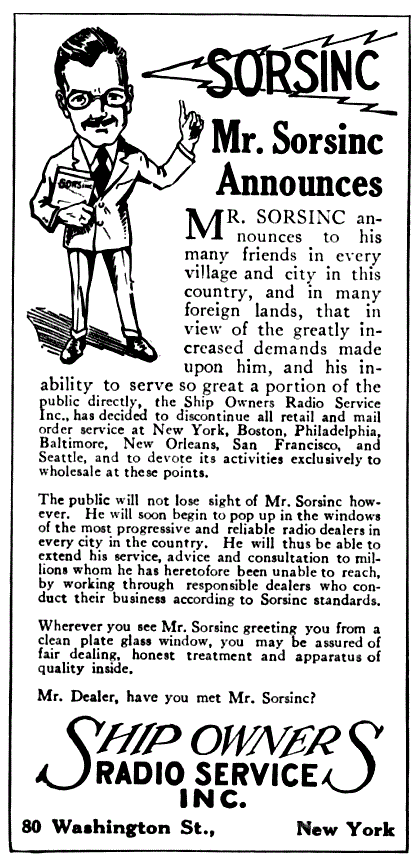
Advertisement for Shop Owners Radio Service, Inc. (1922)

WDT was first licensed on December 22, 1921, with randomly assigned call letters, to the Ship Owners Radio Service at 80 Washington Street in New York City, for operation on the standard "entertainment" wavelength of 360 meters (833 kHz). The Ship Owners Radio Service primarily sold point-to-point radio transmitters for maritime use; however, WDT, in addition to WSN in Norfolk, Virginia, (Note: WSN was first licensed on April 6, 1922 and deleted on January 16, 1923.) and WNAY in Baltimore, Maryland, (Note: WNAY was first licensed in late 1922 and deleted in the summer of 1923.) was one of three short-lived broadcasting stations started by the company.

WDT was one of the first broadcasting stations in the New York metropolitan area, although it was soon joined by numerous others. Initially, all stations making entertainment broadcasts transmitted on the common wavelength of 360 meters, which necessitated a time-sharing agreement to allocate operating hours for individual stations. This soon became complicated, and by June there were in excess of ten regional stations broadcasting on this wavelength.

The station moved to the Stapleton section of Staten Island in New York City in early 1923.

In May 1923 the Department of Commerce, which regulated radio at this time, greatly expanded the number of available transmitting frequencies, including three "Class B" allocations for the Newark/New York City area that were reserved for stations with superior equipment and programmimg. (Note: Beginning with these assignments, radio stations ended the practice of broadcasting their market reports and weather forecasts on the separate 485 meter wavelength.) WDT was assigned to the Class B frequency of 740 kHz, where it shared time with WOR in Newark, New Jersey, and a new Radio Corporation of America station, WJY in New York City.

The upgrade to Class B status coincided with the beginning of joint operations with the Premier Grand Piano Corporation, with a new studio and transmitter installed at that company's factory at 510 West 23rd Street in New York City. In addition, the famous singer Vaughn De Leath, who also was the leader of a sixty-piece orchestra, took over as the station's studio manager. The debut broadcast from the new facility took place on the evening of June 8th, and featured an opening address by De Leath. Station publicity promoted the station's "high character of programs" and "diversity of talent".

In early November, it was announced that WDT was suspending operations for "several weeks while the station is enlarged", and "Upon reopening, WDT will operate on a larger scale, with a program extending over a longer period". However, later that month De Leath left the station to join the cast of Laugh, Clown, Laugh, and WDT was formally deleted on December 28.

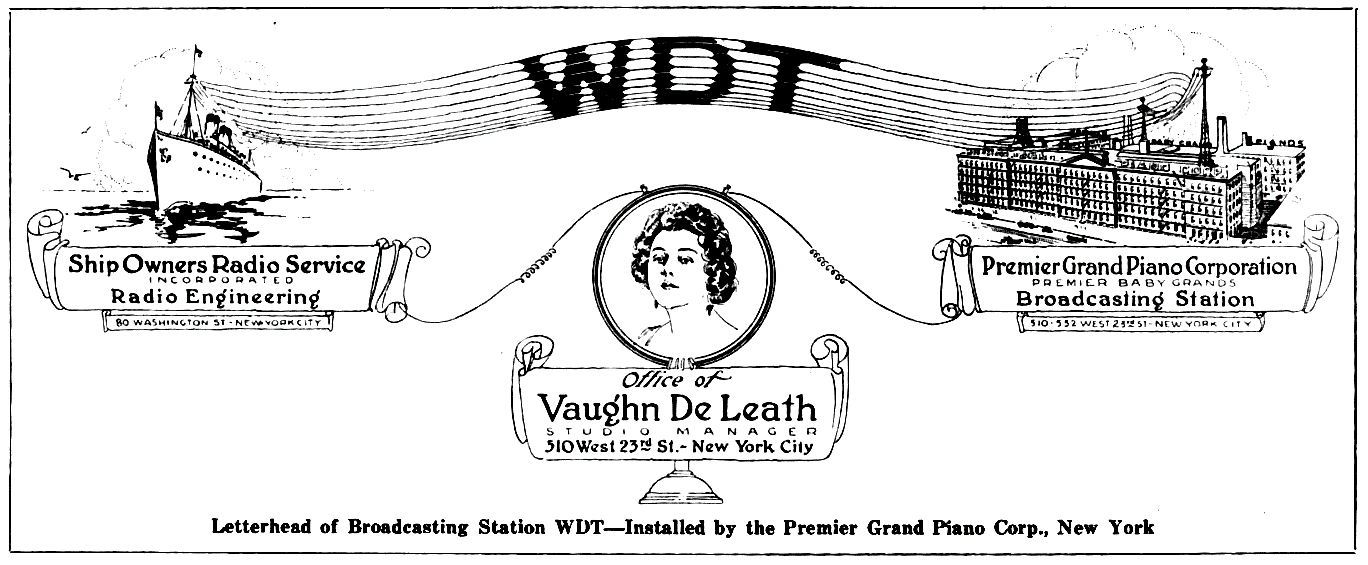
Vaughn De Leath was appointed WDT's studio manager in mid-1923

== See also ==
- List of initial AM-band station grants in the United States
