= WJY (New York City) =

Radio station in New York City (1923–1927)

Coordinates: 40°45′16.55″N 73°58′55.8″W

WJY was an AM radio station located in New York City, licensed to the Radio Corporation of America (RCA) from May 1923 to early 1927. It was operated jointly with RCA's primary New York City station, WJZ. After RCA took over operation of a third New York City station, WEAF, WJY was discontinued as being no longer needed.

== Station history ==
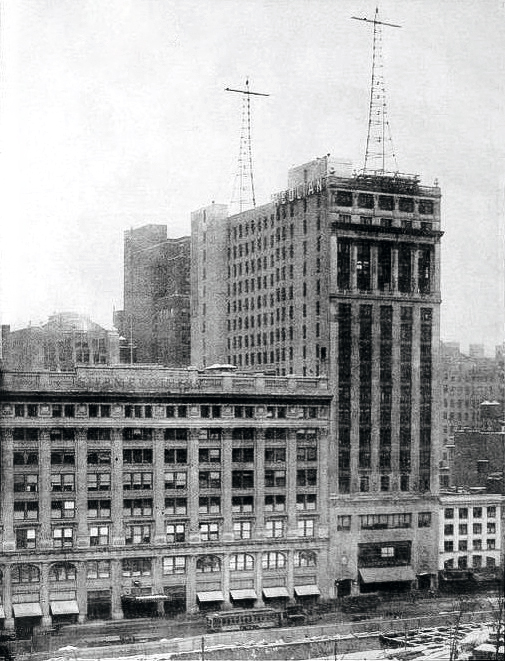
The WJY studios and towers were located (along with WJZ) at Aeolian Hall in New York City (1923)

RCA was an early broadcasting pioneer, and would dominate the American radio and electronics industry for half a century. Its entry into the broadcasting field occurred on July 2, 1921, when a temporary longwave station located in Hoboken, New Jersey, also assigned the call letters WJY, was used for a ringside broadcast of the Dempsey-Carpentier heavyweight boxing match. In December 1921, RCA began regular operation of AM station WDY in Roselle Park, New Jersey, although WDY was shut down just two months later, when RCA began sharing half the cost of a Westinghouse Electric and Manufacturing station, WJZ, located in Newark, New Jersey. On May 15, 1923, RCA took over full responsibility for WJZ, and moved that station from Newark to New York City.

This same day marked the debut of WJY, also located in New York City. WJY and WJZ shared facilities, known as "Radio Broadcast Central", which had been constructed on the sixth floor of Aeolian Hall at 29 West 42nd Street. RCA explained that it was operating two stations so that one could provide "high brow" entertainment (WJZ), and the other "popular" programming (WJY).

Although introductory reviews emphasized that the studios and transmitting equipment provided to WJY and WJZ were equally advanced, it was soon clear that the senior WJZ was the dominant station. WJZ was assigned exclusive use of its 660 kHz frequency, while WJY had to share its frequency, 740 kHz, with two other stations: WOR, operated by Bamberger's Department Store in Newark, New Jersey, and WDT, operated by the Ship Owners Radio Service in New York City. (WDT was deleted by the end of the year). In addition, when RCA started development of a radio network, which eventually evolved into the NBC Blue Network (later the American Broadcasting Company), it normally featured programs originating from WJZ. WJY's program offerings appear to have been very limited. Two months after its debut, its schedule was listed as consisting of a single weekly transmission from 2:30 to 6:30 on Sunday afternoons.

In the summer of 1926, RCA purchased the American Telephone & Telegraph Company's (AT&T) radio operations, including its showcase New York City station, WEAF. WEAF's previous network operations were reorganized as the NBC Red Network, and its prominence was equal to WJZ, further overshadowing WJY. An article in the July 31, 1926 issue of Radio World noted that WOR, WJY's nominal timesharing partner, was now operating full-time because WJY was considered to have forfeited its hours. This report further referred to WJY as "R.C.A.'s weak sister station in New York City", and stated that it "hasn't been doing any broadcasting for a few moons". A month later, an article in Radio Digest quoted WOR management as saying that although their timesharing agreement allocated hours to WJY on Tuesdays, Thursdays, Fridays and Sundays, that station had actually been silent since February 6, and despite assurances by WJY management that they would soon resume broadcasting, it had "remained totally silent".

The station was deleted in May 1927, after failing to apply for a license from the recently established Federal Radio Commission. In a retrospective of his time as engineer-in-charge of WJY-WJZ, Carl Dreher contrasted the prominent status WJZ held within the company's operations as compared to WJY, which he noted "never amounted to much".
