= Carl Dreher =

American electrical engineer

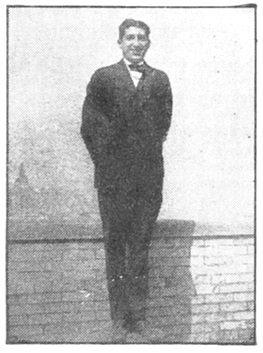
- Dreher atop Aeolian Hall in New York City (1924)
- Born: February 16, 1896; Vienna, Austria-Hungary
- Died: July 13, 1976 (aged 80); Danbury, Connecticut, U.S.
- Occupations: Electrical engineer (radio), sound engineer, author
- Years active: 1917–1976
- Spouse: Rose Dreher

Carl Dreher (Austrian German: [ˈdreːɐ]; February 16, 1896 – July 13, 1976) was an American electrical engineer, two-time Academy Award-nominated sound engineer, and an author who primarily dealt with technical and scientific topics. Directly involved with two technological revolutions—the introduction of radio broadcasting and the development of sound movies—he observed that "No form of communication was safe from the innovative drive of electronics."

== Radio engineer ==
Dreher was born in Vienna, Austria-Hungary (now Austria) in 1896, and emigrated to the United States in 1899. Beginning in 1908 he operated a small amateur radio station while living in the Bronx, and in 1916 qualified for a First Class-First Grade commercial radiotelegraph operator's license. He attended Townsend Harris Hall, the City College of New York (CCNY) preparatory school, graduating in 1913. He then enrolled at CCNY, where his primary instructor was Dr. Alfred N. Goldsmith. The United States entered World War One in April 1917, and Dreher received his B.S. degree in May, a month early, on the condition that he take a civilian position that aided the war effort. He began employment with the Marconi Wireless Telegraph Company of America, working on war contracts in the company's test shop in Aldene, New Jersey, and also became a member of the Institute of Radio Engineers (IRE).

In 1919 American Marconi's assets were purchased by General Electric and reorganized as the Radio Corporation of America (RCA). From 1921 to 1923 Dreher worked as an operating engineer at RCA's transatlantic radiotelegraph station located at Riverhead, Long Island. In May 1923, RCA established two showcase broadcasting stations, WJZ (now WABC) and WJY, at "Aeolian Hall" in New York City. Dreher was initially the facility's chief control operator, but was soon promoted to engineer-in-charge. Drawing on his experiences, he published articles about radio technology and the emerging broadcasting industry, including, beginning in March 1925, the monthly "As the Broadcaster Sees It" column in Radio Broadcast magazine.

== Sound engineer ==
In 1922, Dreher had participated in RCA's review of Charles A. Hoxie's system for recording radiotelegraph signals. It was found to be impractical for that purpose, but was later developed into the RCA Photophone sound-on-film process for recording movie audio. In March 1928 an RCA subsidiary was incorporated in order to promote Photophone, and Dreher became chief engineer of the new company.

In October 1928 RCA joined with Joseph P. Kennedy to form the Radio-Keith-Orpheum (RKO) movie studio in Hollywood, California. A year later, Dreher became the new studio's Director of Recording — a promotion that resulted in his salary being doubled. While at RKO, he developed a parabolic microphone, and regularly wrote about the changing technological advances. During this time, Dreher was nominated for two Sound Recording Academy Awards, for the films The Gay Divorcee and I Dream Too Much.

RKO was formed with the expectation that it would become a major factor in the movie business. However, due to the effects of the Great Depression, plus mismanagement and general organizational turmoil, the company went into a bankruptcy receivership that lasted for seven years.

== Writer ==
Dreher's writing career dated back to early 1915, when he produced a weekly column, "Wireless for Amateurs", for the Rockville Centre Owl. Disillusioned by the chaos of the constant and ineffective reorganizations at RKO, in 1936, at the age of forty, he decided to quit his "job you could do only by sabotaging yourself as a human being", to become a full-time freelance writer.

He was successful in his new career. During World War II, he served as a Major with the Army Air Corps, producing and directing training films. After the war he wrote for multiple publications including Popular Science, The Rotarian, Harpers, and the Journal of the Society of Motion Picture Engineers, in addition to being the science editor for The Nation for the last fifteen years of his life. His final book, Sarnoff: An American Success, was published posthumously in 1977. It is best known for fully dispelling the myth that in 1912 David Sarnoff, while working as a New York City radiotelegraph operator, had been the first person to hear the distress call sent by the RMS Titanic and had operated as the primary contact in the subsequent communications.

== Selected filmography ==
- The Gay Divorcee (1934)
- I Dream Too Much (1935)
- The Crime of Doctor Hallet (1938)
