= I Dream Too Much (1935 film) =

1935 film by John Cromwell

- Theatrical poster
- Directed by: John Cromwell
- Written by: Elsie Finn; David G. Wittels
- Screenplay by: James Gow; Edmund H. North
- Produced by: Pandro S. Berman
- Starring: Lily Pons; Henry Fonda; Eric Blore; Lucille Ball
- Cinematography: David Abel
- Edited by: William Morgan
- Music by: Jerome Kern; Dorothy Fields; Max Steiner (incidental)
- Distributed by: RKO Radio Pictures
- Release date: November 27, 1935
- Running time: 97 minutes
- Country: United States
- Language: English
- Budget: $627,000
- Box office: $640,000

I Dream Too Much is a 1935 American romantic comedy film directed by John Cromwell. It stars Henry Fonda and Lily Pons, as well as Lucille Ball in an early supporting role. It has been described as a "somewhat wispy operetta." Songs are by Jerome Kern and Dorothy Fields. The film was nominated for an Academy Award in the category Sound Recording (Carl Dreher).

== Plot ==
Annette Monard Street is an aspiring singer, who falls in love with and marries Jonathan Street, a struggling young composer.

Jonathan pushes her into a singing career, and she soon becomes a star. Meanwhile, Jonathan is unable to sell his music, and he finds himself jealous of his wife's success.

Concerned about their relationship, Annette uses her influence to get Jonathan's work turned into a musical comedy. Once she achieves this, she then retires from public life in order to raise a family.

== Cast ==
- Lily Pons as Annette Monard Street
- Henry Fonda as Jonathan 'Johnny' Street
- Eric Blore as Roger Briggs
- Osgood Perkins as Paul Darcy
- Lucien Littlefield as Hubert Dilley, Tourist
- Lucille Ball as Gwendolyn Dilley, Tourist
- Mischa Auer as Darcy's Pianist
- Paul Porcasi as Uncle Tito
- Scotty Beckett as Boy on Merry-Go-Round

== Reception ==
Writing for The Spectator in 1936, Graham Greene gave the film a poor review. Greene criticized Jerome Kern's musical score as "pompous and middle-aged" in contrast to the times, which were more in line with fresh musicians like Cole Porter. He did compare Pons favorably to Grace Moore, describing her personality as "less ponderous". The only portion of the film that Greene found to provide a light touch was that of the performing seal.

The film recorded a loss of $350,000.
