= Vaughn De Leath =

- Vaughn De Leath in the 1920s

Background information
- Born: Leonore Vonderlieth; September 26, 1894; Mount Pulaski, Illinois, United States
- Died: May 28, 1943 (aged 48) Buffalo, New York, United States
- Genres: Jazz, crooner, Dixieland, balladeer, musical comedy
- Occupations: Singer, musician, radio performer, broadcasting executive
- Years active: 1920s-1930s
- Label: Various

Vaughn De Leath (September 26, 1894 – May 28, 1943) was an American female singer who gained popularity in the 1920s, earning the sobriquets "The Original Radio Girl" and the "First Lady of Radio." Although very popular in the 1920s, De Leath is obscure in modern times.

De Leath was an early exponent, and often credited as inventor, of a style of vocalizing known as crooning. One of her hit songs, "Are You Lonesome Tonight?," recorded in 1927, achieved fame when it became a hit for Elvis Presley in 1960.

== Early life ==
Born Leonore Vonderlieth in the town of Mount Pulaski, Illinois in 1894, her parents were George and Catherine Vonderlieth. At age 12, Leonore relocated to Los Angeles with her mother and sister, where she finished high school and studied music. While at Mills College, she began writing songs, but dropped out to pursue a singing career. She then adopted the stage name "Vaughn De Leath." Her vocals ranged from soprano to deep contralto. De Leath adapted to the emerging, less restrictive jazz vocal style of the late 1910s and early 1920s.

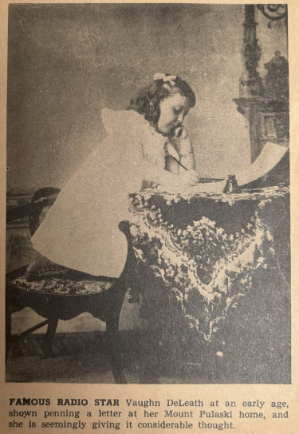
A young Leonore Vonderlieth writing a letter.

== Music career ==
In January 1920, inventor and radio pioneer Lee DeForest brought her to the cramped studio of his station, 2XG, located in New York City's World's Tower, where De Leath broadcast "Swanee River". Although not, as is sometimes stated, the first broadcast of live singing, she established herself as a skilled radio performer, and De Forest would later note: "She was an instant success. Her voice and her cordial, unassuming microphone presence were ideally suited to the novel task. Without instruction she seemed to sense exactly what was necessary in song and patter to successfully put herself across". According to some historical accounts of this incident, having been advised that high notes sung in her natural soprano might shatter the fragile vacuum tubes of her carbon microphone's amplifier, De Leath switched to a deep contralto and in the process invented "crooning", which became the dominant pop vocal styling for the next three decades.

By 1921, in the formative years of commercial radio, De Leath began singing at WJZ, in Newark, New Jersey (a station later known as WABC in New York City). She also performed on the New York stage in the early to mid-1920s, but radio became her primary medium, and she made a name for herself as a radio entertainer.

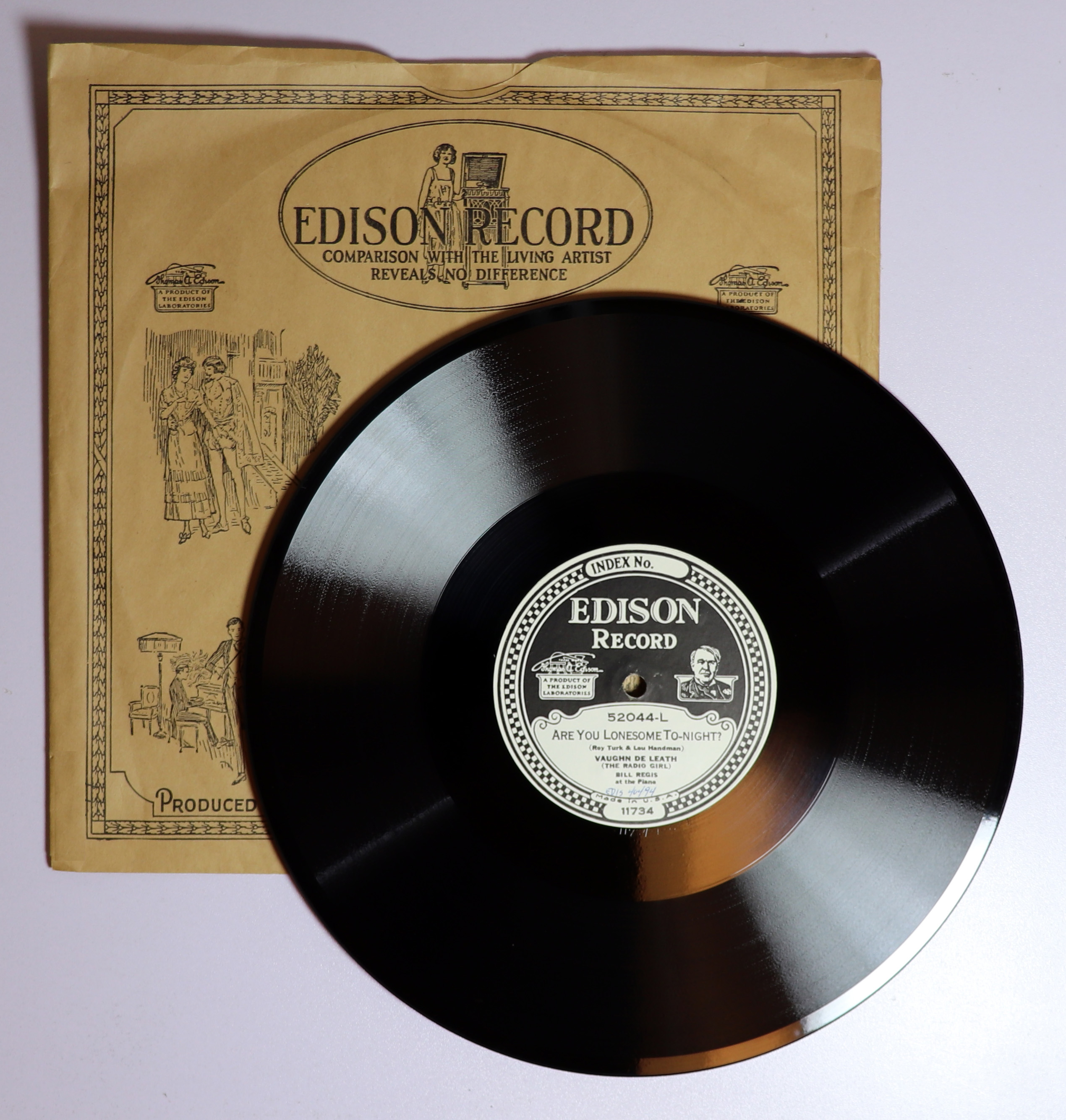
Edison disc record: "Are you lonesome to-night?", performed by Vaughn De Leath, recorded in New York, New York on June 13, 1927.

Her recording career began in 1921. Over the next decade she recorded for a number of labels, including Edison, Columbia, Victor, Okeh, Gennett, and Brunswick. She occasionally recorded for the subsidiary labels of some of these companies under various pseudonyms. These included Gloria Geer, Mamie Lee, Sadie Green, Betty Brown, Nancy Foster, Marion Ross, Glory Clarke, Angelina Marco, and Gertrude Dwyer. De Leath had a highly versatile range of styles, and as material required could adapt as a serious balladeer, playful girl, vampish coquette, or vaudeville comedian.

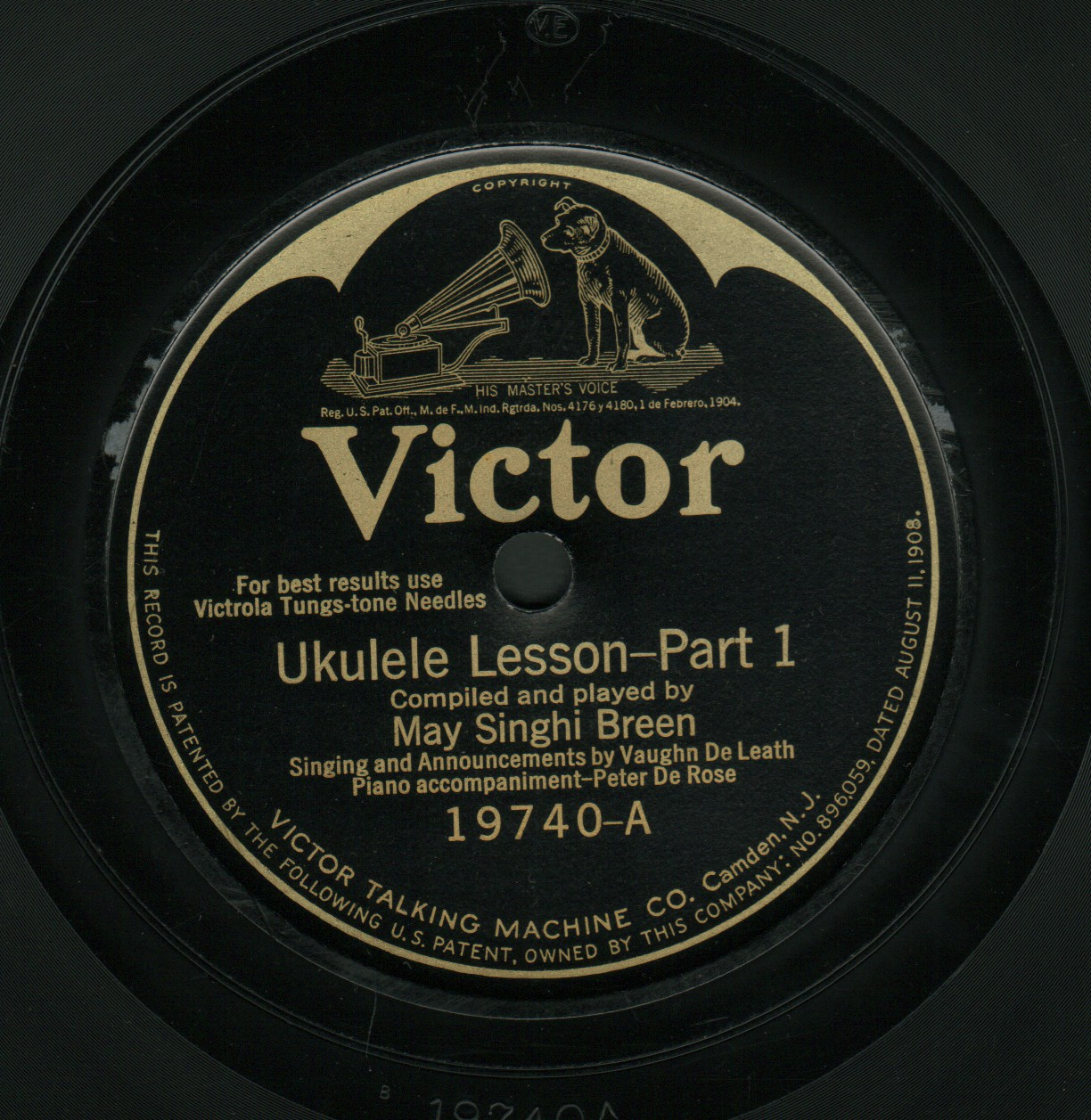
"Ukulele Lesson" 78 rpm disc label

De Leath also recorded songs for silent films, and composed songs, such as "Oliver Twist", written by the singer herself, for the 1922 silent film Oliver Twist. De Leath's recording accompanists included some of the major jazz musicians of the 1920s, including cornetist Red Nichols, trombonist Miff Mole, guitarists Dick McDonough and Eddie Lang, and bandleader Paul Whiteman. She demonstrated a high level of instrumental ability on the ukulele, and occasionally accompanied herself on recordings, including the 1925 hit "Ukulele Lady" (which was used in the 1999 film, The Cider House Rules). In performance she played banjo, guitar, and piano. In 1925 she narrated and sang on a May Singhi Breen ukulele instruction record for the Victor label.

In 1923, she became one of the first women to manage a radio station, WDT in New York City, over which she also performed and led a sixty-piece orchestra. In 1928 she appeared on an experimental television broadcast, and later became a special guest for the debut broadcast of The Voice of Firestone radio show. She also was one of the first American entertainers to broadcast to Europe via transatlantic radio transmission.

De Leath made her last recording in 1931 for the Crown label. She made her final nationwide network performances in the early 1930s. In her waning years, she made radio appearances on local New York stations, including WBEN in Buffalo.

== Marriages, career decline, and death ==
De Leath was married twice. In 1924 she wed artist Leon Geer, from whom she was divorced in 1935. The following year, she married musician Irwin Rosenbloom, from whom she was divorced in 1941.

In 1931, De Leath sued Kate Smith for using the "First Lady of the Radio" designation. Although Smith desisted for a time, she resumed the mantle after De Leath's death.

After her career went into decline, De Leath endured considerable financial difficulties, complicated by a drinking problem, which contributed to her death at age 48 in Buffalo, New York. Her obituary in The New York Times incorrectly stated her age at death as 42. Her ashes were buried in her childhood home of Mount Pulaski, Illinois.
