= Honest Hutch =

1920 film

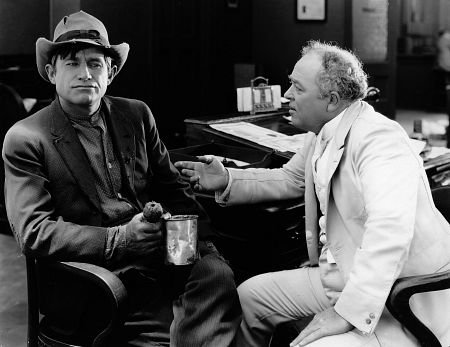
- Will Rogers and Nick Cogley
- Directed by: Clarence G. Badger
- Screenplay by: Arthur F. Statter
- Based on: Old Hutch Lives Up to It by Garret Smith
- Produced by: Samuel Goldwyn
- Starring: Will Rogers; Mary Alden; Priscilla Bonner; Tully Marshall; Nick Cogley; Byron Munson
- Cinematography: Marcel Le Picard
- Production company: Goldwyn Pictures
- Distributed by: Goldwyn Pictures
- Release date: September 19, 1920
- Running time: 50 minutes
- Country: United States
- Language: Silent (English intertitles)

Honest Hutch is a 1920 American comedy film directed by Clarence G. Badger, written by Arthur F. Statter and starring Will Rogers. The supporting cast features Mary Alden, Priscilla Bonner, Tully Marshall, Nick Cogley, and Byron Munson. The film was released on September 19, 1920, by Goldwyn Pictures. The picture was remade in 1936 as Old Hutch starring Wallace Beery in Will Rogers' role.

== Cast ==
- Will Rogers as Hutch
- Mary Alden as Mrs. Hutchins
- Priscilla Bonner as Ellen
- Tully Marshall as Thomas Gunnison
- Nick Cogley as Hiram Joy
- Byron Munson as Thomas Gunnison Jr.
- Edouard Trebaol as A Child
- Jeanette Trebaol as A Child
- Yves Trebaol as A Child
