= Haunted Valley =

1923 film

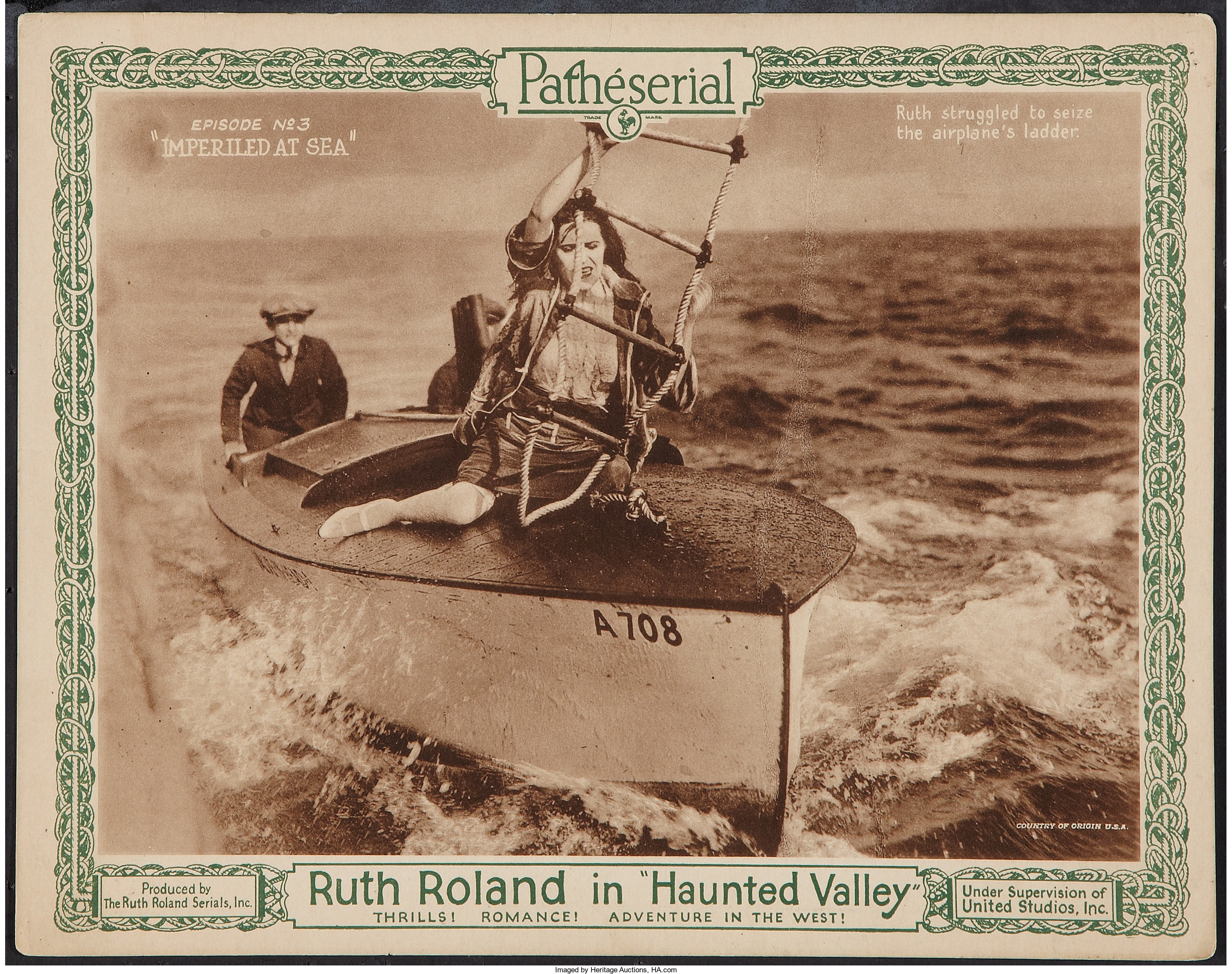
- Lobby card from episode No. 3, "Imperiled at Sea."
- Directed by: George Marshall
- Written by: Frank Leon Smith
- Starring: Ruth Roland; Jack Dougherty; Noble Johnson
- Edited by: Richard C. Currier
- Production companies: Ruth Roland Serials, Inc. United Studios Inc.
- Distributed by: Pathé Exchange
- Release date: 1923
- Country: United States
- Language: Silent (with English intertitles)

Haunted Valley is a fifteen episode American adventure film serial starring Ruth Roland, in which Ruth Ranger, the president of an engineering firm engaged in a construction project at the Lost River Dam, takes out a three-month million-dollar loan from supposed friend Harry Mallinson with the "Haunted Valley" as collateral. It is unknown if the film currently survives.

== Episodes ==
The serial consisted of fifteen episodes, released from May 6, 1923 to August 12, 1923.

1. Bound to the Enemy
2. Adventure in the Valley
3. Imperiled at Sea
4. Into the Earthquake Abyss
5. The Fight at Lost River Dam
6. The Brink of Eternity
7. The Midnight Raid
8. The Radio Trap
9. The Ordeal of Fire
10. The 100th Day
11. Called to Account
12. Double Peril
13. To Hazardous Height
14. In Desperate Flight
15. Disputed Treasure

== Cast ==
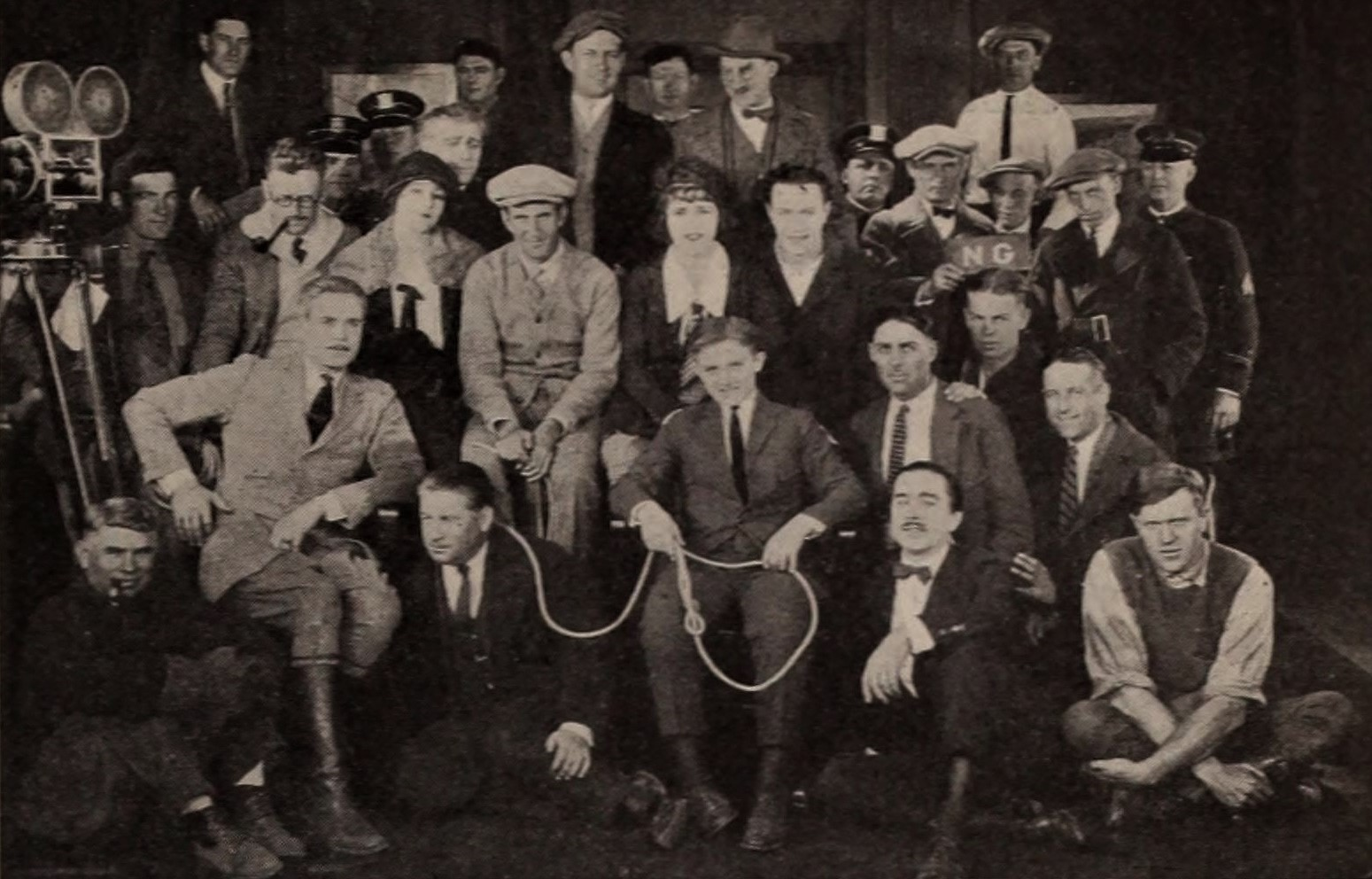
Cast, with Ruth Roland (center), Jack Daugherty (lead), George Marshall (director), Eulalie Jensen, Frank Leon Smith (scenarist) and Larry Steers (left, in high boots)

- Ruth Roland ... Ruth Ranger
- Jack Dougherty ... Eugene Craig
- Larry Steers ... Henry Mallinson
- Eulalie Jensen ... Vivian Delamar
- Aaron Edwards ... Denslow
- William Ryno ... Weatherby
- Francis Ford ... Sharkey
- Edouard Trebaol... Dinny
- Noble Johnson ...
