= Lily Pons =

French-American operatic soprano (1898–1976)

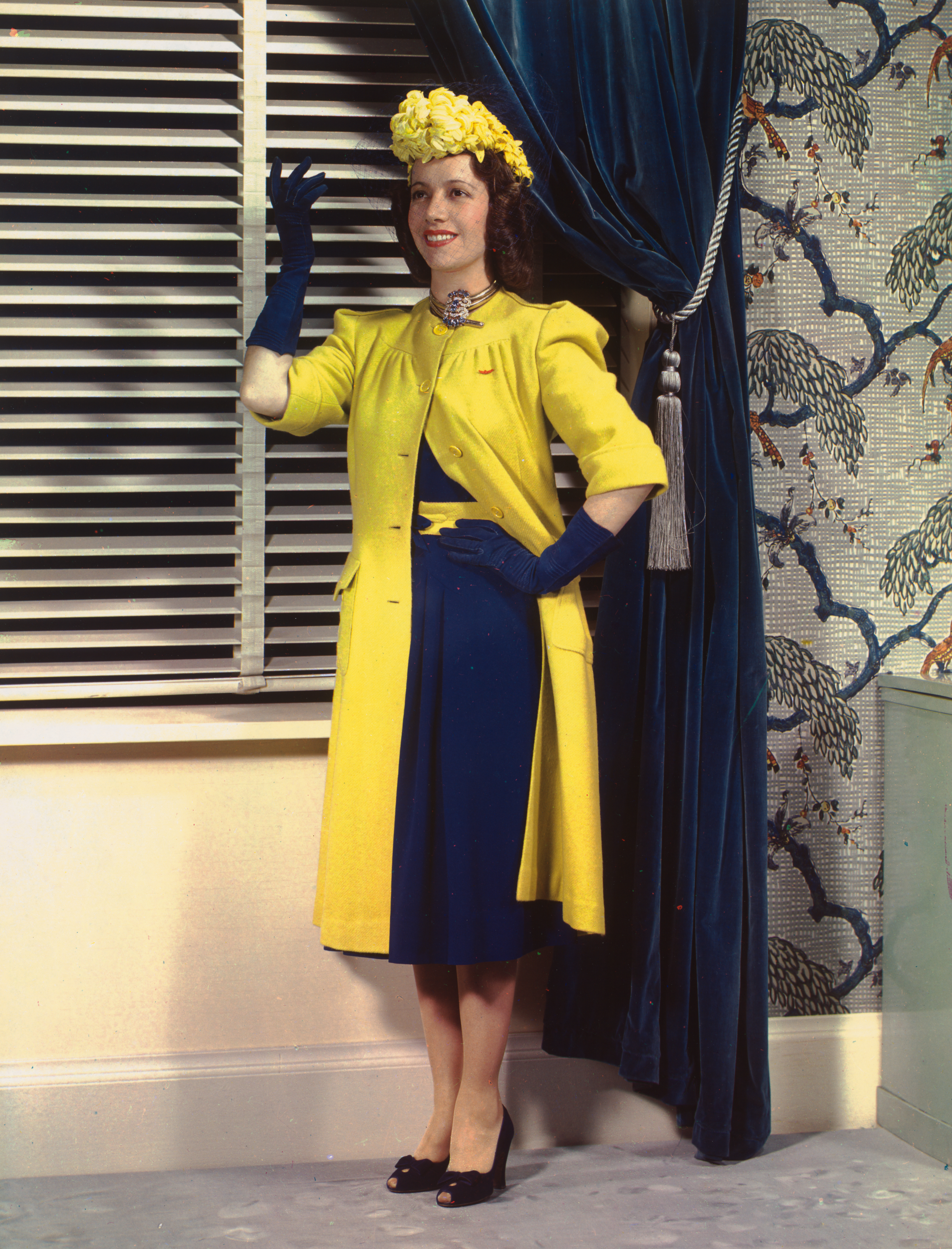
- Lily Pons in 1941
- Born: Alice Joséphine Pons; April 12, 1898; Draguignan, France
- Died: February 13, 1976 (aged 77); Dallas, Texas, U.S.
- Resting place: Cimetière du Grand Jas, Cannes
- Citizenship: France; United States
- Occupations: Opera singer; actress
- Years active: 1920s–1970s
- Known for: Metropolitan Opera lyric coloratura soprano
- Spouses: August Mesritz (m. 1930; div. 1933) Andre Kostelanetz (m. 1938; div. 1958)

Alice Joséphine Pons (April 12, 1898 – February 13, 1976), known professionally as Lily Pons, was a French-American operatic lyric coloratura soprano and actress who had an active career from the late 1920s through the early 1970s. As an opera singer, she specialized in the coloratura soprano repertoire and was particularly associated with the title roles in Lakmé and Lucia di Lammermoor. In addition to appearing as a guest artist with many opera houses internationally, Pons enjoyed a long association with the Metropolitan Opera in New York City, where she performed nearly 300 times between 1931 and 1960.

She also had a successful and lucrative career as a concert singer, which continued until her retirement from performance in 1973. From 1935 to 1937, she made three musical films for RKO Pictures. She also made numerous appearances on radio and on television, performing on variety programs such as The Ed Sullivan Show, The Colgate Comedy Hour, and The Dave Garroway Show. In 1955, she topped the bill for the first broadcast of what became an iconic television series, Sunday Night at the London Palladium. She made dozens of records, recording both classical and popular music. She was awarded the Croix de Lorraine and the Légion d'honneur by the government of France.

Pons was also adept at making herself into a marketable cultural icon. Her opinions on fashion and home decorating were frequently reported in women's magazines, and she appeared as the face for Lockheed airplanes, Knox gelatin, and Libby's tomato juice advertisements. A town in Maryland named itself after her, and thereafter the singer contrived to have all her Christmas cards posted from Lilypons, Maryland. Opera News wrote in 2011, "Pons promoted herself with a kind of marketing savvy that no singer ever had shown before, and very few have since; only Luciano Pavarotti was quite so successful at exploiting the mass media."

== Early life and education ==
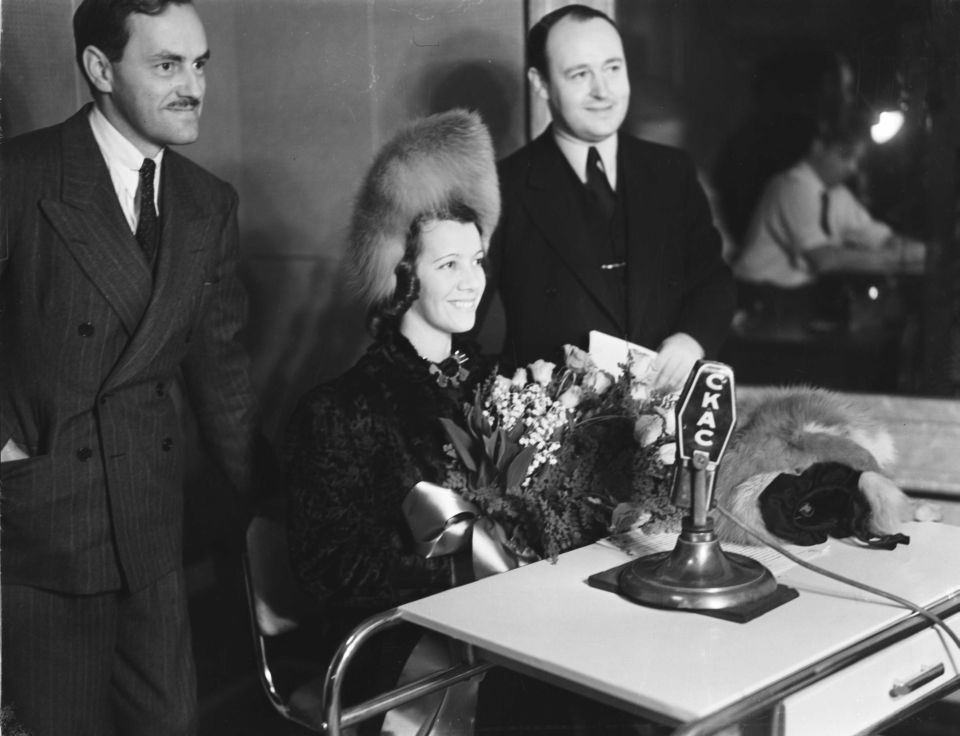
Lily Pons at CKAC, Montreal, 1939

Pons was born in Draguignan in Provence, to a French father, Léonard Louis Auguste Antoine Pons, and an Italian-born mother, Maria (née Naso), later known as Marie Pétronille Pons. She first studied piano at the Paris Conservatory, winning the first prize at the age of 15. At the onset of World War I in 1914, she moved with her mother and younger sister Juliette (1902–1995) to Cannes, where she played piano and sang for soldiers at receptions given in support of the French troops and at the famous Hotel Carlton that had been transformed into a hospital, and where her mother worked as a volunteer nurse orderly.

In 1925, encouraged by soprano Dyna Beumer and August Mesritz, a successful publisher who agreed to fund her singing career, she started taking singing lessons in Paris with Alberto de Gorostiaga. She later studied singing with Alice Zeppilli in New York. On October 15, 1930, Pons married her first husband, Mesritz, and spent the next several years as a housewife. The marriage ended in divorce on December 7, 1933.

== Career ==
Pons successfully made her operatic debut in the title role of Léo Delibes' Lakmé at Mulhouse in 1928 under Reynaldo Hahn's baton, and went on to sing several coloratura roles in French provincial opera houses. She was discovered by the dramatic tenor/impresario Giovanni Zenatello, who took her to New York, where she auditioned for Giulio Gatti-Casazza, the general manager of the Metropolitan Opera. The Met needed a star coloratura after the retirement of Amelita Galli-Curci in January 1930. Gatti-Casazza engaged Pons immediately, and she also signed a recording contract with RCA Victor.

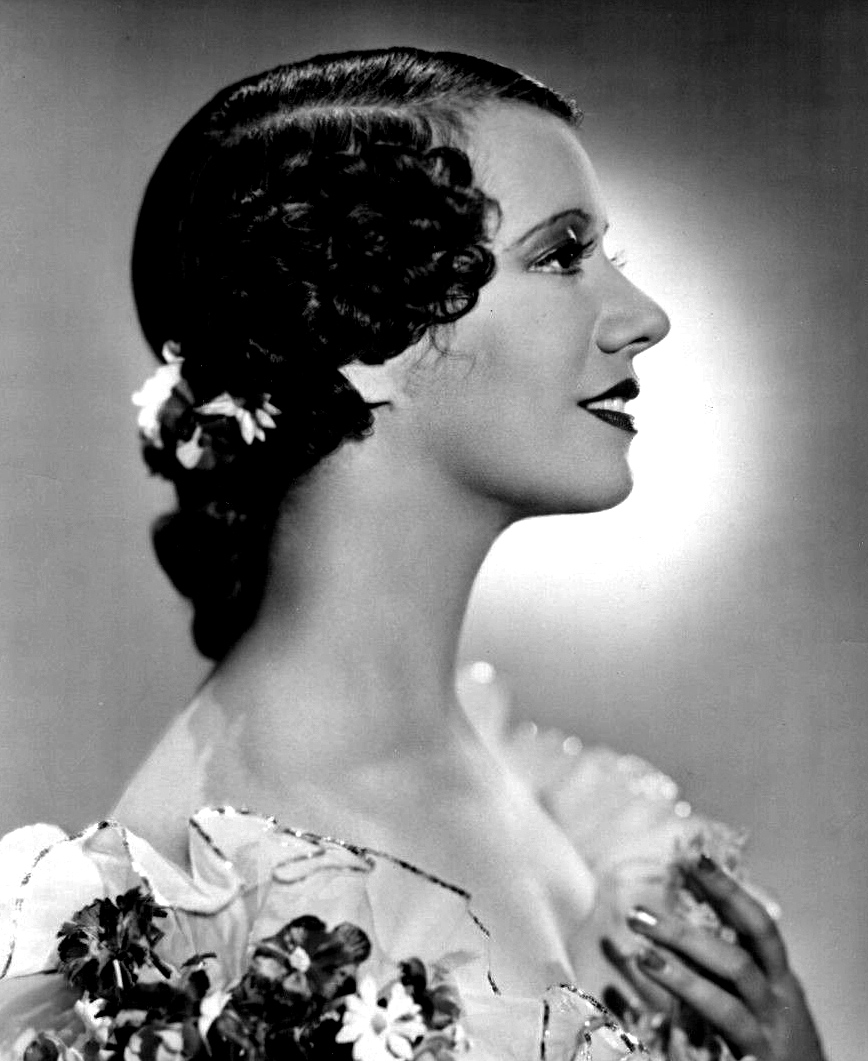
Pons in a costume from I Dream Too Much, 1935

On January 3, 1931, Pons, unknown in the U.S., made an unheralded Met debut as Lucia in Donizetti's Lucia di Lammermoor, and on that occasion the spelling of her first name was changed to "Lily". Her performance received tremendous acclaim. She became a star and inherited most of Galli-Curci's important coloratura roles. Her career after this point was primarily in the United States. She became a naturalized citizen of the United States in 1940. From 1938 to 1958, she was married to conductor Andre Kostelanetz. In 1955, they built a home in Palm Springs, California.

Pons was a principal soprano at the Met for 30 years, appearing 300 times in 10 roles from 1931 until 1960. Her most frequent performances were as Lucia (93 performances), Lakmé (50 performances), Gilda in Verdi's Rigoletto (49 performances), and Rosina in Rossini's The Barber of Seville (33 performances). She drew a record crowd of over 300,000 to Chicago's Grant Park Music Festival in 1939 for a free concert.

In 1944, during World War II, Pons cancelled her fall and winter season in New York and instead toured with the USO, entertaining troops with her singing. Her husband Andre Kostelanetz directed a band composed of American soldiers as accompaniment to her voice. The pair performed at military bases in North Africa, Italy, the Middle East, the Persian Gulf, India, and Burma in 1944. In places, the heat of the sun at the outdoor performances was so overbearing that Pons, always wearing a strapless evening gown, held wet towels to her head between numbers.

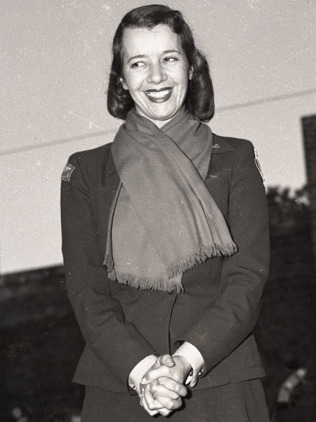
Lily Pons on 8 January 1945 visiting the 24th Combat Mapping Squadron in Bengal, India

In 1945, the tour continued through China, Belgium, France, and Germany in a performance near the front lines. Returning home, she toured the U.S., breaking attendance records in cities such as Milwaukee at which 30,000 attended her performance on July 20, 1945. That same month, she also appeared in Mexico City, conducted by Gaetano Merola.

In 1949 Pons translated into English Jean Cocteau's screenplay and accompanying essays for The Blood of a Poet, calling his film "this great piece of French visual music."

Other roles in her repertoire included Olympia in Jacques Offenbach's The Tales of Hoffmann, Philine in Ambroise Thomas's Mignon, Amina in Vincenzo Bellini's La sonnambula, Marie in Donizetti's The Daughter of the Regiment, the title role in Delibes's Lakmé, the Queen in Nikolai Rimsky-Korsakov's Golden Cockerel, and the title role in Donizetti's Linda di Chamounix, (a role she sang in the opera's Met premiere on March 1, 1934). The last major new role Pons performed (she learned the role during her first season at the Met) was Violetta in La traviata, which she sang at the San Francisco Opera. Another role Pons learned, but decided not to sing, was Mélisande in Debussy's opera Pelléas et Mélisande; the reason, as she confided in a later interview, was twofold: first, because she felt soprano Bidu Sayão owned the role; and secondly, because the tessitura lay mainly in the middle register of the soprano voice rather than in the higher register. In her last performance at the Met, on December 14, 1960, she sang "Caro nome" from Rigoletto as part of a gala performance.

She also made guest appearances at the Opéra Garnier in Paris, Royal Opera House in London, La Monnaie in Brussels, Teatro Colón in Buenos Aires, and the Chicago Opera. Her final opera appearance was as Lucia to the Edgardo of 21-year-old Plácido Domingo in 1962 at the Fort Worth Opera. On February 11, 1960, Pons appeared on NBC's The Ford Show, Starring Tennessee Ernie Ford.

Although Pons continued to sing concerts after she retired, her greatest acclaim occurred in May 1972, when the news media announced that she would emerge from retirement to sing a concert at Lincoln Center under the baton of Andre Kostelanetz, her former husband. All tickets to the concert were sold within an hour of their availability. The program of the historic concert, which took place on Wednesday evening, May 31, 1972, did not include any of the coloratura arias which Pons sang in her prime, but did include ones more suited to her range at age 74. As she often did in earlier concerts, she included "Estrellita" among the songs in her program, and received a prolonged ovation after the concluding note.

== Radio, television, and film ==
She starred in three RKO films: I Dream Too Much (1935) with Henry Fonda, That Girl from Paris (1936), and Hitting a New High (1937). She also performed an aria in the 1947 film Carnegie Hall.

== Death ==
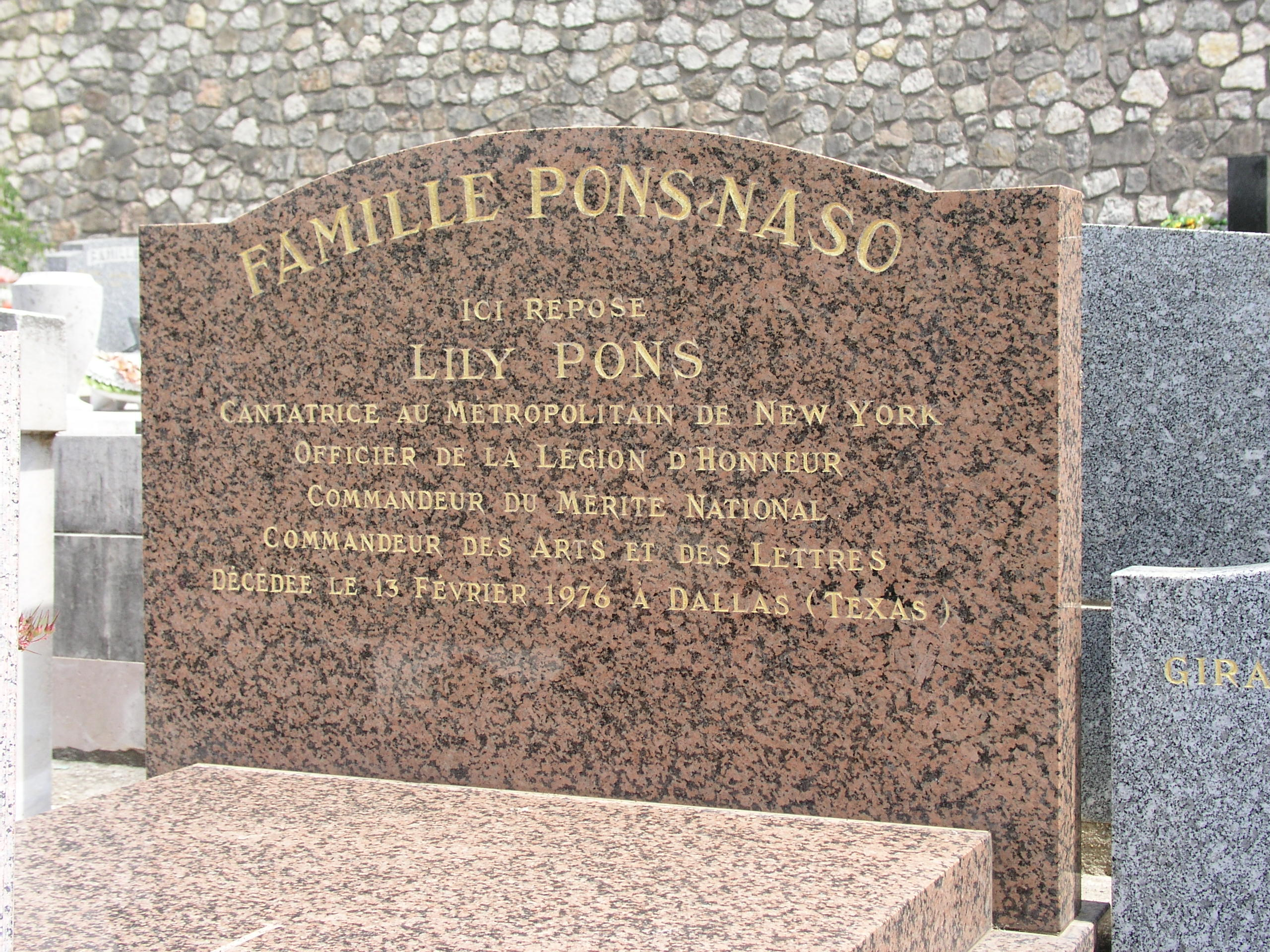
Pons grave in Cannes

In February 1976, Pons died of pancreatic cancer in Dallas, Texas, at the age of 77. Her remains were brought back to her birthplace to be interred in the Cimetière du Grand Jas in Cannes. Her nephew, John de Bry (son of her sister, Juliette Pons), was until his death in 2025 an accomplished archaeologist and historian living in Florida. His two daughters are now her only direct living relatives.

== Legacy ==
A village in Frederick County, Maryland, 10 miles south of Frederick, Maryland, is called Lilypons in her honor. There were extensive water gardens at the site, which was open to the public until 2025.

George Gershwin was in the process of writing a piece of music dedicated to her when he died in 1937. The incomplete sketch was found among Gershwin's papers after his death, and was eventually revived and completed by Michael Tilson Thomas; it was given the simple title, "For Lily Pons".

Pons donated Ita, her pet ocelot, to the New York Zoological Gardens when it became too dangerous to remain in her apartment in The Ansonia on Manhattan's Upper West Side. Pons had received the pet, which she believed was a baby jaguar, from a friend in Brazil. The pet and Pons were very attached to each other, but it snarled at visitors and was deemed a hazard.

The 1937 Merrie Melodies cartoon The Woods Are Full of Cuckoos caricatures Pons as "Lily Swans".

In 1937 the Boston and Maine Railroad, at the suggestion of Wayne E. Whittemore of the Hobbs Junior High School in Medford, Massachusetts, named its locomotive 4108, a 4-8-2 Mountain type in her honor and invited her to a ceremony at North Station to dedicate 4108 and other Mountain locomotives whose names were chosen by New England schoolchildren.

In Stephen Frears's 2016 film Florence Foster Jenkins, Pons is played by Aida Garifullina.

There is a line of depression-era glassware, originally created in the 1930s, known as "Lily Pons". It comes in several colors and takes the shape of lily pads and lily flowers.

== Recordings ==
External audio
- Lily Pons performing: "Ombre Legere" (Shadow Song) from "Dinorah" and "The Mad Scene" from Lucia di Lammermoor in 1948; Here on archive.org

Pons left a significant legacy of recordings, on the Odeon (1928–29), RCA Victor (1930-40), and Columbia (1941–54) labels, and included excerpts from Il barbiere di Siviglia, La bohème, Brother and Sister, Les contes d'Hoffmann, Die Entführung aus dem Serail, Die Zauberflöte, Lakmé, Mireille, Le nozze di Figaro, Parysatis, Rigoletto, Alessandro, Le coq d'or, Dinorah, Floridante, Lucia di Lammermoor, Mignon, L'enfant et les sortilèges, La fille du régiment, Linda di Chamounix, La perle du Brésil, Porgy and Bess, I puritani, Il re pastore, Roméo et Juliette, La sonnambula, Le timbre d'argent, La traviata, Le toréador, Zémire et Azor, as well as songs by Julian Benedict, Henry Bishop, Claude Debussy, Henri Duparc, Gabriel Fauré, Charles Gounod, Myron Jacobson, Frank La Forge, and Darius Milhaud.

Pons also starred in complete recordings of Die Fledermaus (as Adele, 1950–51) and Lucia di Lammermoor (1954).
