= Oliver Twist (Vaughn De Leath song) =

Song by Vaughn De Leath
- Released: 1922
- Songwriters: Vaughn De Leath (music and lyrics)

Oliver Twist is a 1921 song written by singer Vaughn De Leath (born Leonore von der Liethi), and performed by her as the first song sung by confirmed trans-Atlantic commercial radio broadcast. In 1922 the song was one of the early major tie ups between silent pictures and music publishers, with De Leath's song being sung, and played instrumentally, during showings of the 1922 silent film Oliver Twist starring the child actor Jackie Coogan.

The Wireless Age (1923) presented an interview with "Vaughn De Leath, The Original Radio Girl", which recounted the 12:30AM December 9, 1922 WJZ radio broadcast from New York to London.

The Star-Spangled Banner burst upon the air like the coming of a cyclone. ... And then a voice came in "WJZ - WJZ - WJZ." ... His Majesty's Consul-General in New York then spoke briefly, expressing the hope that radio will be the means of cementing the English- speaking peoples of the world even more closely. Then Vaughn De Leath sang.

This was the first confirmed trans-Atlantic reception of a U.S. broadcasting station.

An article "Oliver Twist" song in Spotlight's Glare in The Music Trades (November 11, 1922) described the link with the Coogan film as "One of the biggest tie ups ever undertaken in connection with a picture feature song".
