= Jack Dempsey vs. Georges Carpentier =

Boxing match

Coordinates: 40.721°N 74.060°W

Fight of the Century
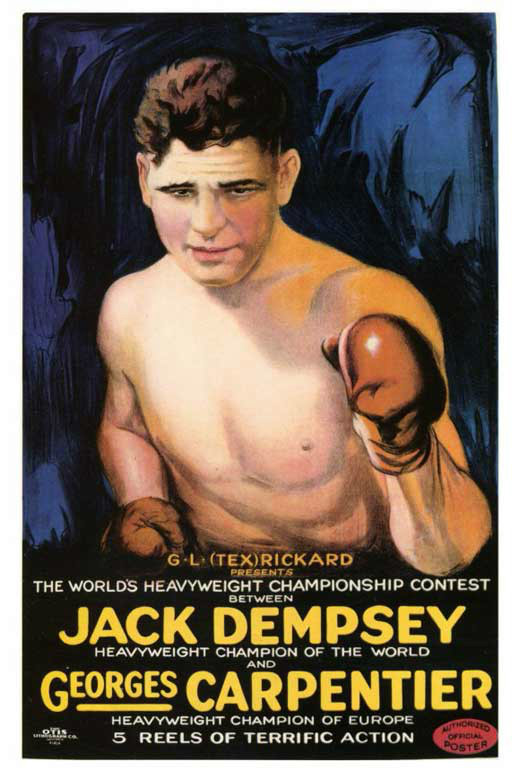
- Poster announcing the filmed version of the fight.
- Date: July 2, 1921
- Venue: Boyle's Thirty Acres, Jersey City, New Jersey, U.S
- Title(s) on the line: NBA, NYSAC, and The Ring undisputed heavyweight championship

Tale of the tape
Boxer	Jack Dempsey	Georges Carpentier
Nickname	The Manassa Mauler	The Orchid Man
Hometown	Manassa, Colorado, U.S.	Lievin, France
Pre-fight record	59–4–9 (6) (49 KO)	81–11–5 (52 KO)
Age	26 years	27 years, 5 months
Height	6 ft 1 in (185 cm)	5 ft 11 1/2 in (182 cm)
Weight	190 lb (86 kg)	174 lb (79 kg)
Style	Orthodox	Orthodox
Recognition	NBA, NYSAC and The Ring undisputed Heavyweight Champion	NBA, NYSAC and The Ring undisputed Light Heavyweight Champion

Result
- Dempsey wins via 4th-round KO

Jack Dempsey vs. Georges Carpentier, billed as Fight of the Century, was a professional boxing match contested on July 2, 1921, for the undisputed heavyweight championship. It was the first sporting event to produce $1,000,000 in revenue, or a "million dollar gate" at a then record of $1,789,238.

== Background ==
Jack Dempsey was the world Heavyweight champion since he beat Jess Willard by a fourth-round knockout in 1919. The challenge by Carpentier would be his third title defense, after retaining the championship against Billy Miske and Bill Brennan. Both Miske and Brennan died shortly after fighting Dempsey, of causes unrelated to their fights.

Carpentier was the world Light-Heavyweight champion, having beaten Battling Levinsky by a fourth-round knockout in his previous bout to win the title at Westside Ballpark in Jersey City.

Despite the fact the bout was held in the United States, Dempsey, the American defending champion, was cast as an anti-hero to Carpentier, the French challenger, who was seen as a hero by fans. During World War I Carpentier was decorated for bravery in battle with the Croix de Guerre and the Médaille Militaire, while in the United States Dempsey went on trial in 1920 accused of draft evasion. At the same time Dempsey also went through a divorce from his first wife, Maxine.

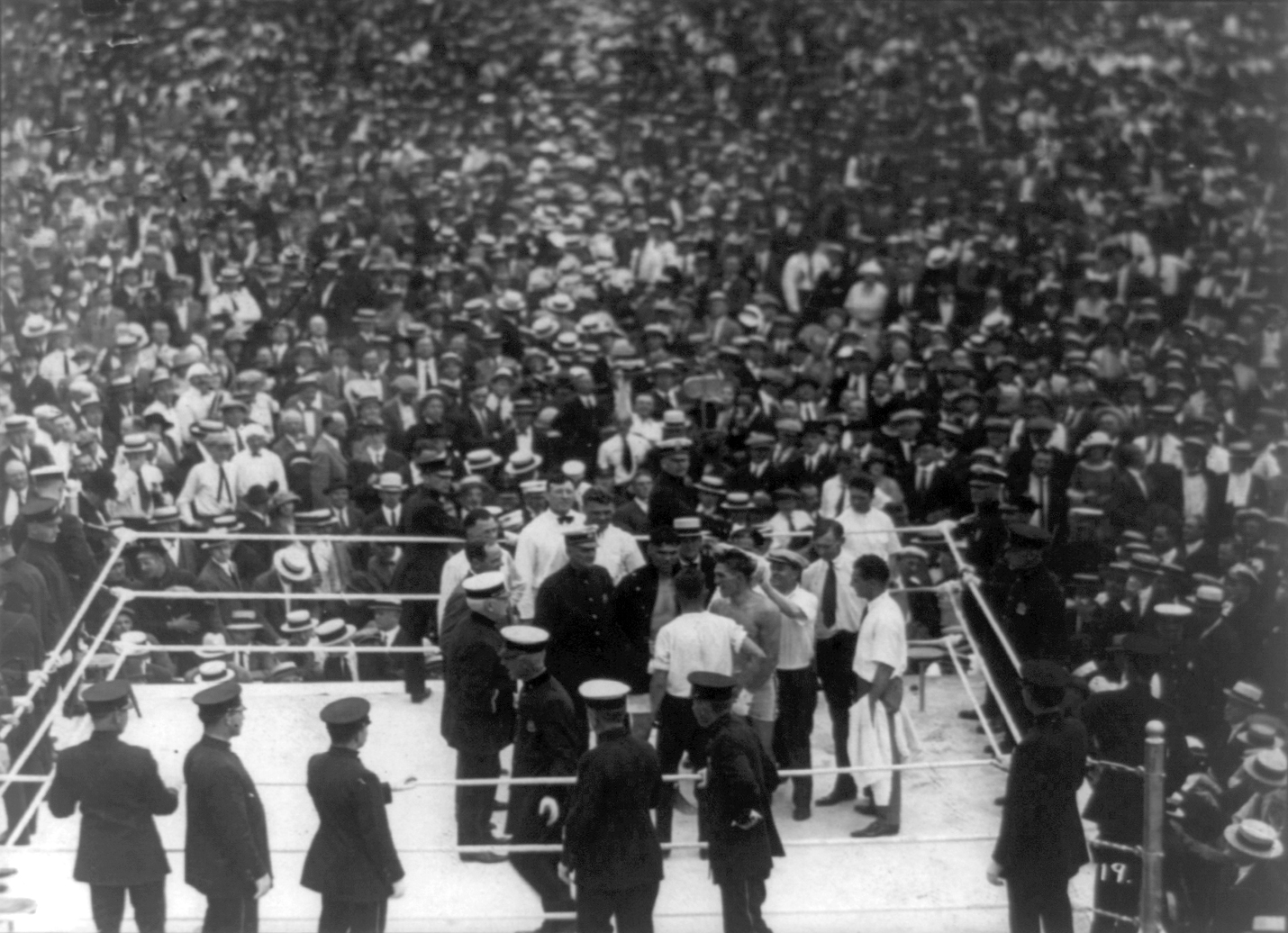
The two boxers facing each other on July 2, 1921

Tex Rickard, Dempsey's promoter, built up the fight, using the public's view of both fighters as a way to promote the bout. Rickard mainly operated out of the Madison Square Garden in New York, New York, but at the time he was having trouble with authorities at the New York State boxing commission and Tammany Hall. In addition, New York governor Nathan L. Miller opposed having the fight take place in his state. Also, Rickard envisioned a larger crowd than the Madison Square Garden could fit coming to this fight, and he preferred boxing fights to be held at outside arenas so he built Boyle's Thirty Acres in Jersey City, with a capacity for 80,000 paying customers. Rickard borrowed an amount of $250,000 (in 1921 money) to make the arena.

Wireless Age, a technology magazine of the era, had held a convention in New York City from March 16 to the 19th of the same year. Julius Hopp was a concert organizer at the Madison Square Garden, and he asked Rickard for permission to broadcast the fight live on radio. Hopp then attended the convention and met local radio enthusiasts. In addition, several radio stations had begun broadcasting in New York City, including Westinghouse's KDKA. John Ringling, Rickard's Madison Square Garden partner, opposed live transmission of the bout, but he relented once a compromise was reached to have radio equipment located outside instead of inside the arena. AT&T also protested, refusing to connect a ringside telephone line to a transmitter.

The transmitter used was said to be the largest ever built up to that time. It was built by General Electric and set up at the Lackawanna train terminal in Hoboken, from where the bout was transmitted by a temporary station, WJY, operated by the Radio Corporation of America, to theaters, halls and auditoriums in 61 other cities across the United States. The fight became the first world title fight to be carried over radio, ushering in an era of boxing radiocasts that lasted until the accessibility and popularity of televised boxing.

On the afternoon of July 2, 1921, the first fight to take place before the main event was between boxers Frankie Burns and Packey O'Gatty. Burns won that fight on points in eight rounds. The last preliminary bout before the main event featured Gene Tunney defeating Soldier Jones in seven rounds. Tunney would eventually beat both Dempsey and Carpentier in later years.

== The fight ==
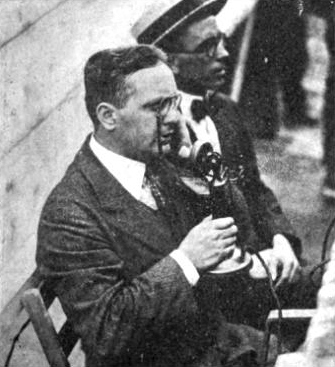
J. Andrew White (announcing) and Harry Welker at ringside broadcasting the fight over station WJY (New Jersey)

Review of the broadcast, by RCA's temporary longwave radio station, WJY

Dempsey outweighed Carpentier by 20 pounds, weighing 188 to the French challenger's 168. According to Dempsey's autobiography, promoter Tex Rickard feared that Dempsey would annihilate Carpentier inside of one round so Rickard specifically asked the champion not to score an early knockout. Harry Ertle was the referee.

Both men wore white boxing trunks, although Carpentier's trunks had a vertical blue stripe running up each leg.

Predictably, Dempsey was clearly the heavier puncher throughout the fight, though Carpentier landed his share of punches in the early rounds, before eventually succumbing to the powerful right hand of the American.

In round two, a solid right to the jaw had Dempsey groggy. But Dempsey recuperated and began dominating the bout in round three.

Less than a minute into the fourth round, Dempsey's relentless pressure resulted in Carpentier being floored with a stinging left-right combination from the champion. It looked like Carpentier would not beat the count, but he rose to his feet suddenly at referee Harry Ertle's count of nine. However, the fight ended shortly thereafter, at one minute and 16 seconds of round four, when Dempsey knocked out Carpentier with another combination that included a hard right hook to the body.

== Aftermath ==
The Jack Dempsey versus Georges Carpentier bout was the first boxing fight to produce $1,000,000 in revenue, or a "million dollar gate" at a then record of $1,789,238. It was also the first heavyweight championship fight where women attended in great numbers. This can be attributed to the favorable pre-fight press Carpentier had received in many New York City newspapers that portrayed him as a dashing, handsome and stylish French war hero.

Dempsey kept the heavyweight title until 1926, then lost it to Gene Tunney on points after ten rounds. In 1927, Dempsey attempted to regain the title from Tunney in what became known as The Long Count Fight, but again lost by ten rounds decision. He retired after that fight and operated a restaurant in New York City, dying in 1983 at age 87.

Carpentier fought twelve more times, going 7-4-1 during that span. One of those bouts was a fifteenth-round knockout defeat at the hands of Tunney. He became an actor in France, participating in eight feature films. Carpentier died in 1975.

Both fighters are members of the International Boxing Hall of Fame.

== Undercard ==
Confirmed bouts:

Preceded by vs. Bill Brennan	Jack Dempsey's bouts 2 July 1921	Succeeded by vs. Tommy Gibbons
Preceded by vs. Battling Levinsky	Georges Carpentier's bouts 2 July 1921	Succeeded by vs. George Cook
