= Jinx (film) =

1919 film by Victor Schertzinger

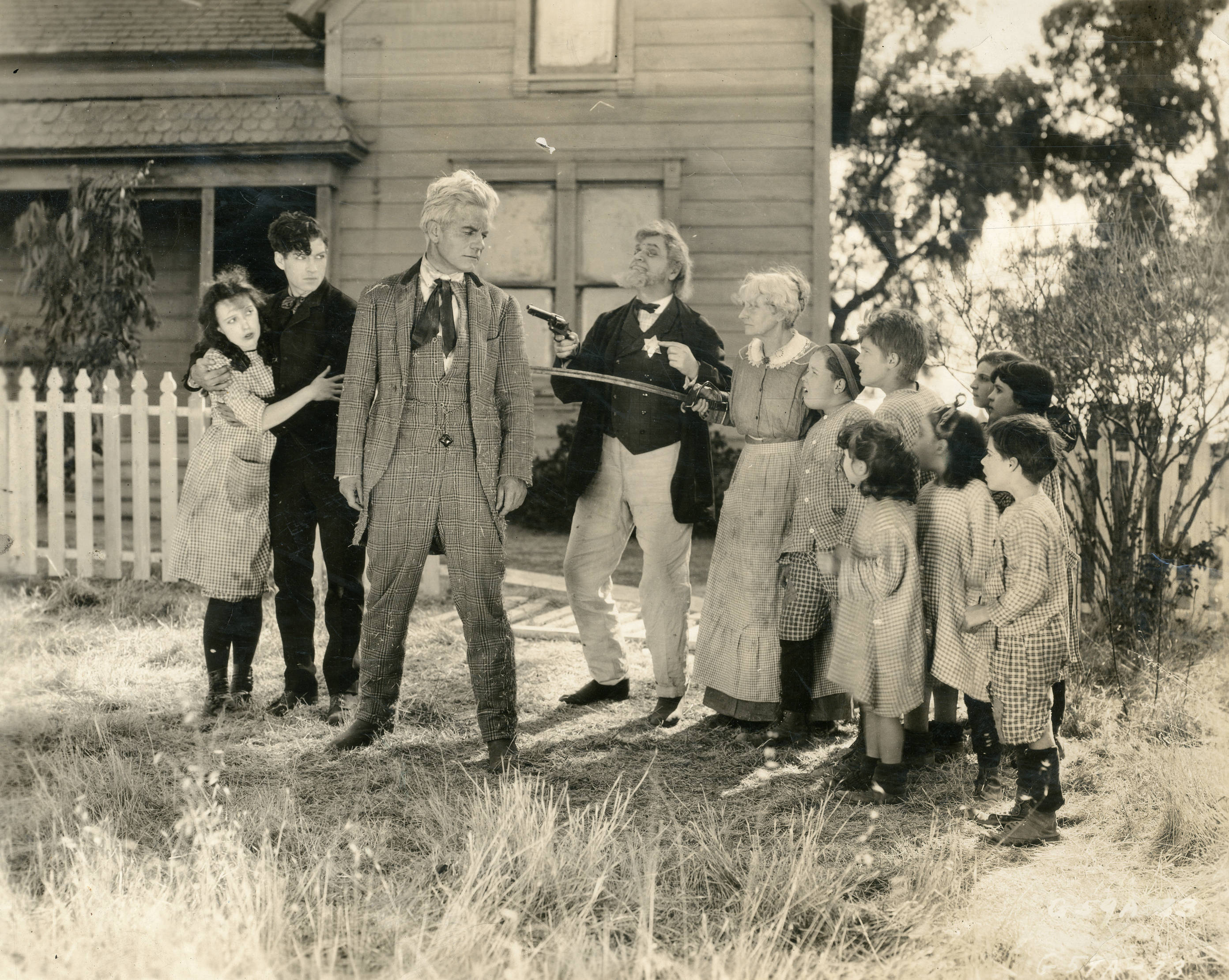
- Still with Mabel Normand
- Directed by: Victor Schertzinger
- Written by: Gerald C. Duffy (scenario)
- Story by: Shannon Fife
- Produced by: Samuel Goldwyn
- Starring: Mabel Normand
- Cinematography: George Webber
- Distributed by: Goldwyn Pictures
- Release date: December 13, 1919
- Running time: 50 minutes
- Country: United States
- Language: Silent (English intertitles)

Jinx is a 1919 American silent comedy film starring Mabel Normand and directed by Victor Schertzinger. It is not known whether the film currently survives, which suggests that it is a lost film.

It was exhibited at New York City's Capitol Theatre in December 1919.

== Cast ==
- Mabel Normand as The Jinx
- Florence Carpenter as Rory Bory Alice
- Ogden Crane as Bull Hogarth
- Cullen Landis as Slicker Evans
- Clarence Arper as Sheriff Jepson
- Gertrude Claire as Aunt Tina Carbery
