= Oliver Twist (1922 film) =

1922 film

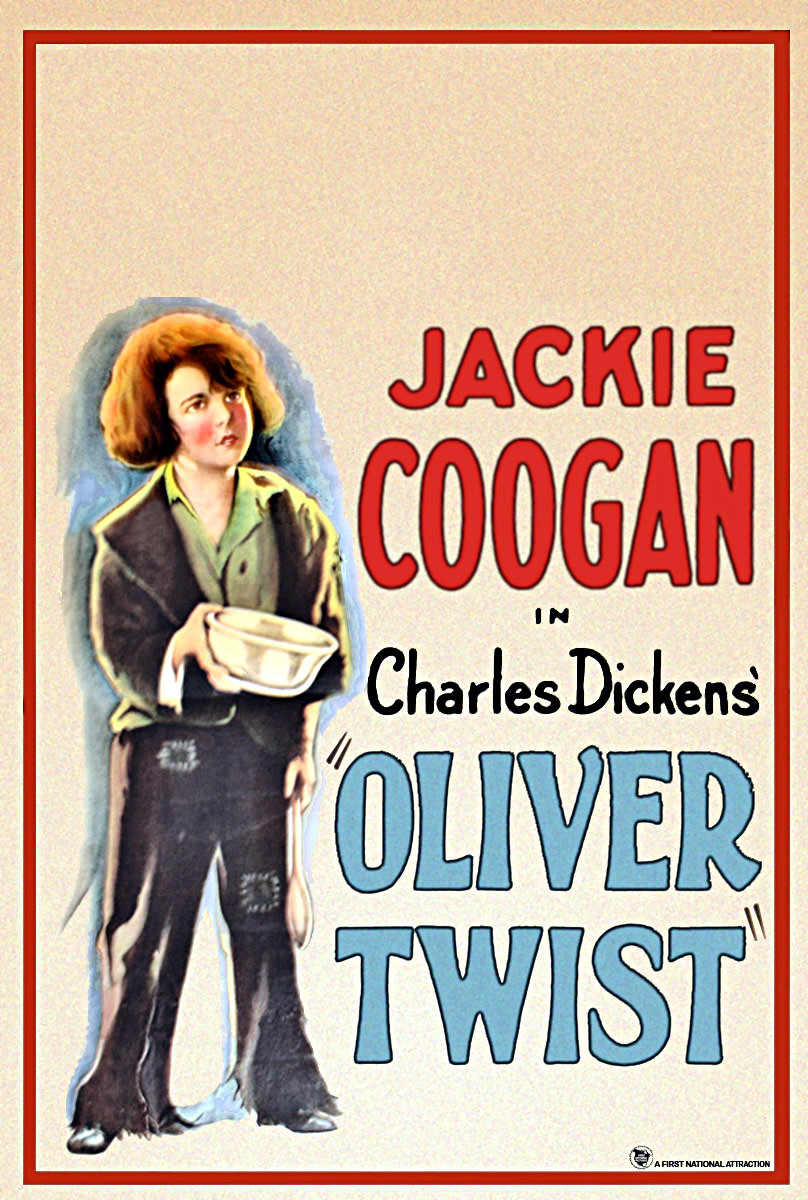
- Film poster
- Directed by: Frank Lloyd
- Written by: Frank Lloyd; Harry Weil; Walter Anthony (titles)
- Based on: Oliver Twist; 1837 novel by Charles Dickens
- Produced by: Sol Lesser; Jackie Coogan Productions
- Starring: Lon Chaney; Jackie Coogan
- Cinematography: Glen MacWilliams; Robert Martin
- Edited by: Irene Morra
- Music by: Vaughn De Leath (Original theme); John Muri (new 1975 score)
- Distributed by: First National Pictures
- Release date: October 30, 1922
- Running time: 74 minutes (8 reels)
- Country: United States
- Language: Silent (English intertitles)
- Budget: $400,000

Oliver Twist is a 1922 American silent drama film adaptation of Charles Dickens' 1838 novel Oliver Twist, featuring Lon Chaney as Fagin and Jackie Coogan as Oliver Twist. The film was directed by Frank Lloyd. It was selected as one of the best pictures of 1922 by New York Times, Chicago Tribune and the Los Angeles Times. Walter J. Israel handled the costuming. Studio interiors were filmed at the Robert Brunton Studios in Hollywood. The film's tagline was "8 Great Reels that make you ask for more. Will Hays says Jackie Coogan Films are the sort the World needs." A still exists showing Fagin training his wards to be pickpockets.

Coogan was at the height of his career during the filming, having played the title role in Charles Chaplin's The Kid the previous year.

Chaney was at the height of his career as the silent film's "Man of A Thousand Faces". He would play the title role the following year in The Hunchback of Notre Dame, and three years later The Phantom of the Opera.

== Plot ==
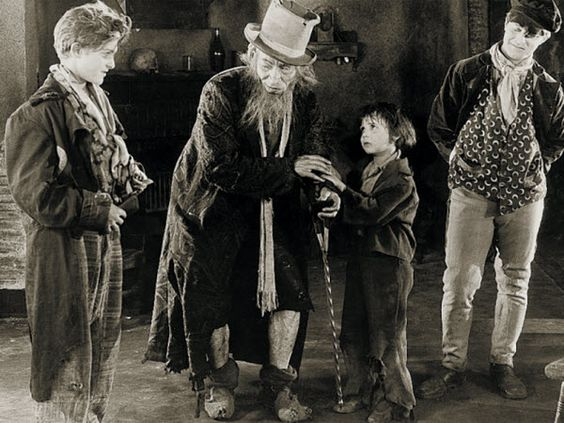
Oliver (Jackie Coogan) held captive by Fagin (Lon Chaney) and his criminal gang

Oliver Twist (1922)

During the 1830s, in a country workhouse somewhere in England, a very young woman outcast of unknown history dies giving birth to a boy. Nine years later, the boy in particular who has been given the unlikely name of Oliver Twist by the cruel parish beadle Mr. Bumble, after losing out in a secret draw with the other orphan boys, gets into trouble with the workhouse authorities for daring to asking for more supper - if you can call one pathetically small bowlful of gruel a supper (asking "Please, sir...I want some more?").

As a result, Mr. Bumble apprentices him off to Mr. Sowerberry, an uncaring undertaker who mistreats the boy so badly that one day he rebels for the first time in his life, then runs away to London to seek his fortune. Shortly afterwards, Mr. Bumble is summoned to a private meeting with a sinister man calling himself Mr. Monks who inquires information about Oliver, and easily bribes the greedy official into yielding him a gold locket that was the only thing of value found on Oliver's mother after her death, as well as the only proof that she along with her son are actually from a wealthy family. Mr. Monks charges Mr. Bumble to remain silent about their transaction and goes on to London to track Oliver down.

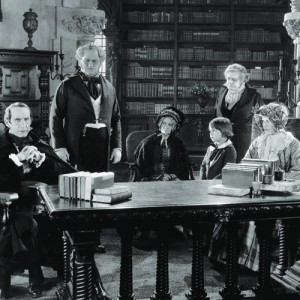
Oliver (Coogan), third from the right, with his child-protecting benefactors

As for Oliver himself, on the road to London he is befriended by a cocky street urchin calling himself the Artful Dodger, who offers to take the orphan to his home which is located in one of the filthiest London slums. There the Dodger and several other boys like him are living under the care of an odd and seemingly benign old Jewish miser named Fagin, who gladly takes Oliver in. Oliver does not suspect that his newfound benefactor is in reality a crafty local crime lord, who has taken all these boys to order to train them to steal and to pick pockets for him and his brutal, thieving partner-in-crime Bill Sikes. Fagin subtly introduces Oliver to the world of crime, getting him to participate with the other boys in a deceptively innocent game in which they each have to pick handkerchiefs and other articles out of the old man's many great coat pockets without him feeling anything. Oliver succeeds on his first try, and Fagin rewards him with a coin.

Shortly afterwards, Oliver meets Sikes' doxy Nancy who takes an instant liking to the boy on sight. Eventually Oliver gets caught in his first pickpocketing mission, even though it is the Dodger and another boy who steal a handkerchief from a kindly old gentleman. At his trial however, the victim Mr. Brownlow takes pity on the boy and arranges for him to be released into his custody.

At Mr. Brownlow's home located in one of the wealthier sections of London, Oliver experiences true kindness for the first time in his life. Unfortunately fearing exposure, Fagin and Sikes have him tracked down and kidnapped through Nancy, who immediately regrets her part in the abduction.

During all this Mr. Monks finally tracks Oliver down to Fagin's den and hires Fagin and Sikes to help him prevent the secret of Oliver's parentage from coming to light, and tells him to keep the boy with the gang. Nancy gets wind of their scheme though, and at the risk of her life arranges a midnight rendezvous at London Bridge with Mr. Brownlow, whom she informs about Monks and of his plans for Oliver, and arranges with him to rescue Oliver from the gang's clutches. But her efforts are discovered by Fagin and Sikes, the latter brutally murdering her for interfering.

After a thrilling rooftop chase, Sikes accidentally hangs himself and Fagin is arrested by the police while Oliver is happily reunited with Mr. Brownlow, who successfully tracks Monks down. Monks confesses that Oliver is his long lost step brother, and the true heir to a vast fortune left by their late father. Oliver forgives Monks and persuades Mr. Brownlow, who has become his guardian, not to turn him over to the police. His quest for love has ended in fulfilment.

== Cast ==
Chaney as the gang leader Fagin

- Jackie Coogan as Oliver Twist
- Lon Chaney as Fagin
- Edouard Trebaol as The Artful Dodger
- George Siegmann as Bill Sikes
- Gladys Brockwell as Nancy
- James A. Marcus as Mr. Bumble
- Aggie Herring as Mrs. Corney
- Nelson McDowell as Mr. Sowerberry
- Lewis Sargent as Noah Claypole
- Joan Standing as Charlotte
- Carl Stockdale as Mr. Monks
- Taylor Graves as Charley Bates
- Lionel Belmore as Mr. Brownlow
- Florence Hale as Mrs. Bedwin
- Joseph Hazelton as Mr. Grimwig
- Gertrude Claire as Mrs. Maylie
- Esther Ralston as Rose Maylie
- Eddie Boland as Toby Crackit

== Film preservation ==
The film was considered lost, until a print surfaced in Yugoslavia in 1973. The print lacked English language intertitles, which were subsequently restored by Blackhawk Films with the help of Jackie Coogan and Sol Lesser, more than 50 years after it was made.

It is held by:

- Cineteca Del Friuli (Gemona, Italy)
- Gosfilmofond of Russia (Moscow, Russia)
- Library of Congress (Washington DC, United States)
- UCLA Film and Television Archive (Los Angeles, California, United States)
- Steven Spielberg Jewish Film Archive (Jerusalem, Israel)
- BFI/National Film and Television Archive (London, United Kingdom).

When the film was originally released in 1922, it had a music score specially created for it by Vaughn De Leath. In the 1970s, a new musical score by John Muri was added to the restored print, and it was released in 1975 at a special screening at Filmex in Los Angeles. Prints can be found at Blackhawk Films, the UCLA Film and Television Archive and the Library of Congress. The film is readily available on DVD.

== DVD release ==
On June 30, 2009, a Region Free DVD of the movie was released by Alpha Video.

== Critical comments ==
Director Frank Lloyd won praise for faithfully recreating the novel’s atmosphere through thoughtful production design and casting; Jackie Coogan was widely hailed as an ideal, sterling young Oliver whose star power often dominated the film, while Lon Chaney’s Fagin received mixed notices—his makeup and character work were repeatedly called exceptional and impressive, though some critics found the role theatrically overstated or subordinated compared with stage portrayals. Several trade and daily papers praised the picture as charming, worthwhile, and a major industry achievement, with one contemporary ad even calling it “the greatest film triumph of the decade.”

== See also ==
- List of rediscovered films
