= WJY (New Jersey) =

Temporary longwave radio broadcasting station (1921)

WJY was a temporary longwave radio station, operated by the Radio Corporation of America (RCA) and located in Hoboken, New Jersey, which, on July 2, 1921, was used for a ringside broadcast of the Dempsey-Carpentier heavyweight boxing match.

The fight details were also telegraphed to station KDKA in East Pittsburgh, Pennsylvania, and broadcast from there by a local announcer. These broadcasts were a cooperative effort, designed to raise money for the American Committee for Devastated France and the Navy Club. This also marked RCA's entrance into the radio broadcasting field, which the company would dominate in the U.S. for the next half century.

== History ==
Although the general facts about WJY's Dempsey-Carpentier broadcast are well documented, significant discrepancies exist for certain details in the recollections of individual participants. (Note: In particular, in addition to Julius Hopp, over time both J. Andrew White and David Sarnoff would claim credit for being the person who originated the idea of the broadcast.)

=== Background ===
In 1920, radio broadcasting in the United States, which before World War I had been limited to a few scattered experimental efforts, was just starting to develop, although there were still very few homes with radio receivers, and most listening was done by amateur radio enthusiasts. Looking for interesting programming, station operators began adding sports events, including boxing matches. In January 1920, Lieutenant Herbert E. Metcalf, in conjunction with the Sacramento Radio Club, used U.S. Army Signal Corps equipment to announce from ringside a series of boxing matches taking place at Mather Field. The following September, the Detroit News employed its "Detroit News Radiophone" station, 8MK, to broadcast summaries telegraphed from nearby Benton Harbor, Michigan, as Jack Dempsey made short work of Billy Minske, knocking out his opponent in the third round. On April 11, 1921, Westinghouse's broadcasting station KDKA in East Pittsburgh, Pennsylvania, carried ringside reports by Florent Gibson of a Johnny Ray vs. Johnny Dundee 10 round no-decision match.

Meanwhile, fight promoters were looking for ways to improve the image of their sport and increase its popularity. In January 1921, a bout between Benny Leonard and Richie Mitchell at the Madison Square Garden arena in New York City was conducted as a benefit for the American Committee for Devastated France, working with philanthropist Anne Morgan, who was chair of that charity's executive committee. Julius Hopp, manager of Madison Square Garden concerts, who helped coordinate the charity match, was on the lookout for additional opportunities. In March 1921 he was reportedly introduced to radio broadcasting, after being "impressed with the skill of New York amateur radio men as disclosed at the Second District Convention", which was held at the Hotel Pennsylvania in New York City. One feature of this convention was that "music sent from the Bedloe Island Signal Corps Station via radiofone was heard almost continuously".

Hopp came up with the idea of combining radio broadcasting with charity work, and began to develop a plan to broadcast the upcoming "Battle of the Century" heavyweight championship fight between Jack Dempsey and Georges Carpentier. He approached Madison Square Garden owner and fight promoter G. L. "Tex" Rickard and Rickard's associate Frank E. Coultry, and received permission to work out the details.

=== Preparation ===
Broadcasting radiophone reports in this manner for the first time in history, [makes] possible the successful accomplishment of the following objects:
Promotion of amity between the nations represented in the greatest international sporting event on record.
The scientific triumph of simultaneous transmission of the human voice without the aid of wires to audiences in many cities.
The contribution of financial and material aid in the task of rehabilitating the war-torn and devastated regions of France.
Aiding establishment and maintenance of a home, hotel and club for enlisted men of the United States Navy and Marine Corps.

— "July 2nd Fight Described by Radiophone", The Wireless Age, July 1921, page 10.

Hopp's overall plan was to raise funds for the American Committee for Devastated France, by recruiting listening locations at selected theaters and halls, which would charge an admission fee that would be donated to the charity. However, he needed extensive technical assistance in order to set up the transmission and reception sites. Canvasing for individuals with radio expertise, he contacted the head of the American Radio Relay League, Hiram Percy Maxim, who dismissed the idea as impractical. Hopp then approached the National Amateur Wireless Association (NAWA), an organization headquartered at 326 Broadway in New York City, that was originally formed under the auspices of the Marconi Wireless Telegraph Company of America, and which became affiliated with the Radio Corporation of America (RCA) when that company was created in 1919 to take over the American Marconi assets. The acting president of NAWA, J. Andrew White (Guglielmo Marconi was the nominal president) was immediately interested, and set out to use his extensive industry and amateur radio contacts to organize the transmission and recruit volunteers to staff receiving sites.

Next approached was RCA's then-general manager David Sarnoff, who White knew had been keenly interested in the possibilities of radio broadcasting. Sarnoff financed the project by surreptitiously withdrawing $1,500 from an account holding funds accumulated from equipment rental. Arthur Batcheller, the government's Chief Radio Inspector for the second Radio Inspection district, arranged for a temporary radio station authorization, to be operated by RCA, and issued the random call letters of WJY. In order to provide the best possible coverage, the plan was to transmit on a longwave wavelength, 1600 meters (187 kHz), that was normally used by the U.S. government. Commander D. C. Patterson, District Communication Officer, approved this use of 1600 meters and helped insure that government stations would not interfere at the time of the scheduled broadcast.

One of the prime participants would be J. O. Smith, who had recently become director of the correspondence division of RCA's Radio Institute of America, and was well known in the amateur radio field through his Special Amateur station 2ZL, (Note: The "2" in 2ZL's call sign indicated that the station was located in the second Radio Inspection district, while the "Z" designated that it was operating under a Special Amateur license.) located in Valley Stream, New York. Smith determined that a high-powered transmitter was being built in Schenectady, New York, for the U.S. Navy by RCA's parent company, General Electric. He arranged for White to meet with the former assistant Secretary of the Navy (and future president) Franklin D. Roosevelt, to get permission to use this transmitter for the proposed broadcast. Roosevelt was the president of The Navy Club, and one of the conditions for approval was that his organization share, along with the American Committee for Devastated France, in the charitable receipts. White arranged for a tug to deliver the transmitter from Schenectady.

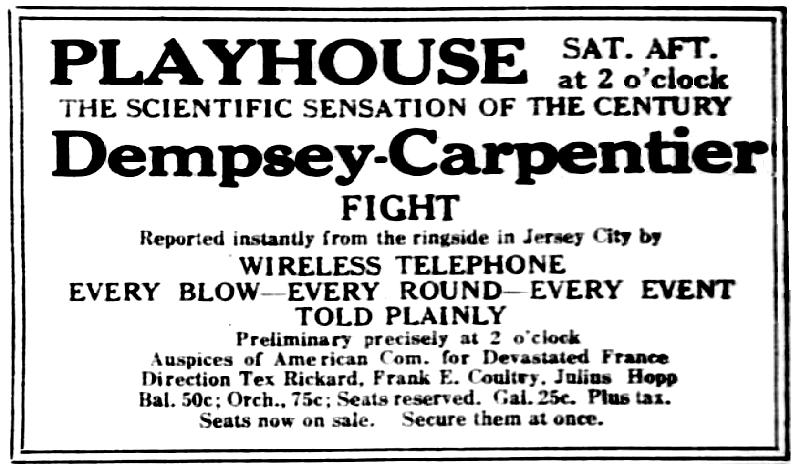
Advertisement promoting attendance at the Playhouse theater in Wilmington, Delaware

On June 10, a circular soliciting volunteers from the ranks of amateur radio enthusiasts was mailed to 7,500 NAWA members. A formal application blank included with the circular was used by Smith to vet the responses and determine which individuals were qualified to assist. In addition to being acting president of NAWA, J. Andrew White was the editor of RCA's Wireless Age magazine, and the preparations, which included installing aerials and receivers capable of loudspeaker operation, were publicized in its pages. Julius Hopp, representing the American Committee for Devastated France and the Navy Club, reported that eleven halls, theaters and auditoriums had been secured within greater New York, in addition to forty-seven cities spanning from Massachusetts to Maryland, and westward to Pennsylvania, for a total of 58 admission sites.

The fight took place in Jersey City, New Jersey, where Rickard arranged for the construction of an outdoor arena accommodating 90,000 persons at Boyle's Thirty Acres. The initial proposal was to set up a radio transmitter and construct an antenna at ringside, but this proved to be impractical due to cost and logistical considerations. An alternate plan was developed after it was determined that there was an unused radio tower 2 1/2 miles (4.0 kilometers) from the arena, located at the Lackawanna train station in adjacent Hoboken, which was left over from earlier train communication tests.

George W. Hayes was responsible for the general supervision of the installation at Hoboken, while W. J. Purcell, a General Electric employee detailed for the task, had primary responsibility for installing and testing the transmitter. The end of a hallway, in a railroad yard building primarily used by Pullman porters, was set aside as a transmitter location, and a large flat-top "T-type" antenna 250 feet (76 meters) high and spanning 450 feet (140 meters) was strung between the existing tower and the railroad station's clock tower.

It had been announced that the transmitter used for broadcasting would be rated at 3½ kilowatts, producing an antenna current of 20 to 25 amperes, however, the actual transmitter ratings would be somewhat less. The set consisted of six 250-watt Radiotron tubes. All six tubes, totaling 1½ kilowatts, were used for radiotelegraph (CW) work. For audio transmissions, three of the tubes were used to modulate the signal, which produced currents between 14 and 16 amperes. Test transmissions began on Friday evening, June 24, with successively greater powers used until preparations were completed on July 1. Hundreds of reception reports received from amateur radio operators monitoring WJY's performance provided reassurance that the signals were readily audible, and reaching the intended coverage area radius of 200 miles (320 kilometers).

=== July 2, 1921 broadcast ===
Dempsey-Carpentier radio broadcast over WJY (July 2, 1921)

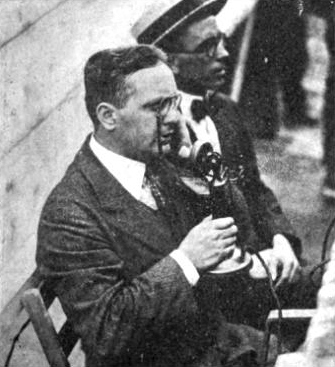
J. Andrew White (announcing) and Harry Welker at ringside

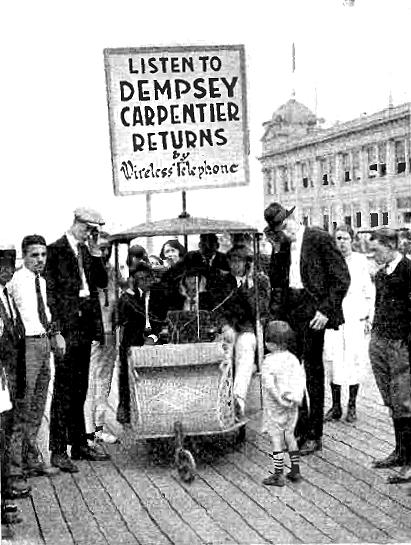
Receiving the broadcast at W. Harold Warren's roller chair at Asbury Park, New Jersey

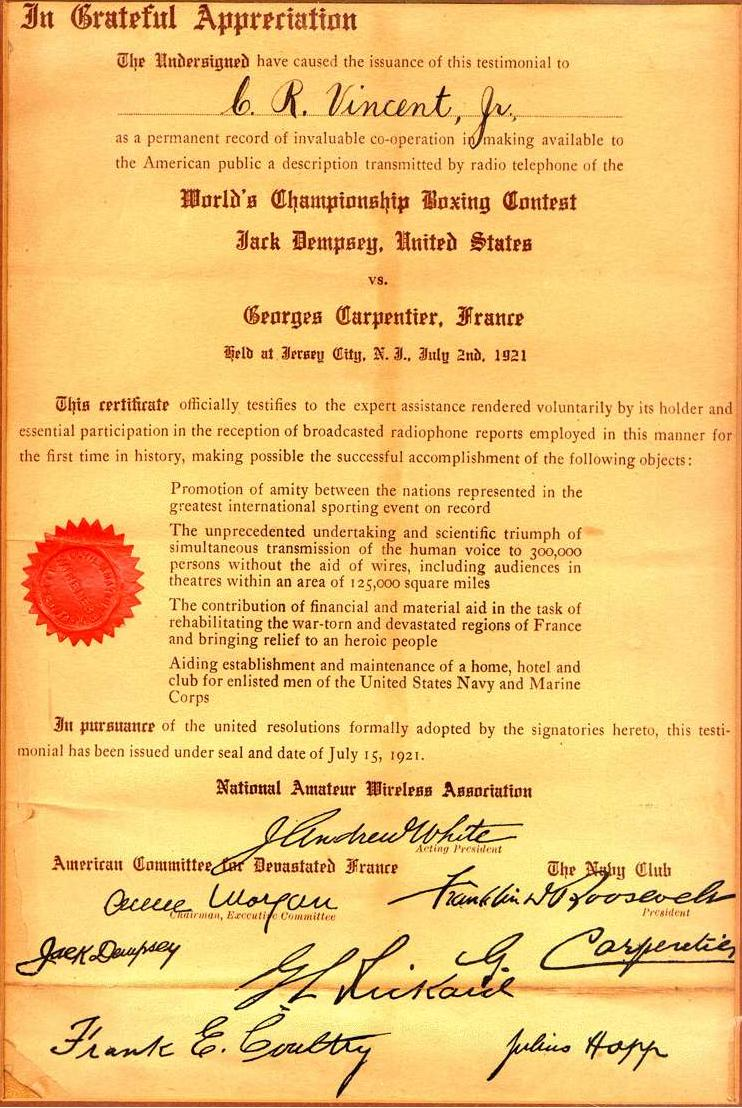
Participation certificate issued to C. R. Vincent, Jr.

The original broadcast plan was to have J. Andrew White's ringside commentary carried directly over the air, via a telephone line that had been installed running from ringside to the Hoboken transmitter room. However, the American Telephone and Telegraph Company (AT&T) objected to having a telephone connection made to the radio transmitter. (Note: In July 1920, AT&T made a cross-licensing agreement covering radio-related patents with General Electric, RCA's parent company. In the resulting distribution of rights under the agreement, AT&T claimed it held a monopoly on telephone-radio transmitter connections.) The solution was to have a "Mr. Sheehey of the Broad street office" type White's telephoned descriptions as they were received at the transmitter site, with the transcripts then given to J. O. Smith for reading over the air. To increase verisimilitude, a spare gong was placed near the transmitter, which was sounded in order to mimic the one at the ring that signalled the opening and closing of each round.

The day of the broadcast was hot and humid, with morning showers. White, his assistant Harry Welker, and David Sarnoff were positioned at ringside next to the press box. White, who had been an amateur boxer, provided most if not all of the descriptions, although some accounts state that Sarnoff also participated in the announcing. The radio reports were timed so that each round was described during a three-minute period, with a one-minute interval between rounds. It was estimated that the bulletins were broadcast within a minute after they had been received at the Hoboken site. WJY was on the air for a total of about four hours. The programming opened with a series of preliminary bouts, which were conducted at half-hour intervals, and concluded with the Dempsey-Carpentier fight, which ended when the champion, Dempsey, knocked out Carpentier in the fourth round.

Overall the broadcast was considered a major success, with the transmission achieving its goal of a high-quality signal that in some cases exceeded the anticipated 200 mile range. Estimates of the total audience size, perhaps generous, ranged from 200,000 to 500,000 listeners, enough to easily qualify as the largest radio audience to date. In addition to the listening sites established by the American Committee for Devastated France and the Navy Club, some additional locations had been independently set up by radio amateurs. J. Andrew White reported receiving hundreds of congratulatory letters at his Wireless Press office, which included "approximately $550" in contributions, in addition to an unknown total of admission fees collected by the charities at the participating theaters and auditoriums. (One of David Sarnoff's biographers reported that "Miss Morgan's charity reaped its greatest single windfall". However, RCA historian George H. Clark concluded that although the broadcast was a technical success, "financially it benefited the club organizations in name only".) Wireless Age mentioned in passing that there were "six theatres arranged for in the Pittsburgh district and assigned to the Westinghouse Company" These sites, which included Forbes Field, received reports broadcast by the Westinghouse Electric & Manufacturing Co. station, KDKA, which had received telegraphed summaries sent by engineers who were monitoring WJY at the Westinghouse facility in Newark, New Jersey.

=== Aftermath ===
Seeing an opportunity for future growth, in his July 1921 report J. Andrew White suggested that "the Radio Corporation interests can dominate the amateur field". However, compared with the burgeoning home consumer sales that began within the year, the amateur radio market would be a niche of limited interest to RCA, and NAWA was disbanded a few years later. David Sarnoff foresaw a much greater potential. In a cover letter for the distribution of the White report, he noted that "It indicates the possibilities of radio devices for receiving broadcasted news and falls under the Music Box dream." (Since at least 1916, Sarnoff had been promoting home entertainment by radio using an appliance he called the "radio music box".) RCA would go on to dominate radio broadcasting in the United States, selling millions of radio receivers, in addition to establishing the National Broadcasting Company and its radio networks.

Following the success of the WJY fight broadcast, and with broadcasting stations beginning to be set up by a number of other companies, RCA soon began to establish a permanent presence. Initially there was talk about introducing a regular broadcast service over WJY at Hoboken. However, RCA decided instead to construct a new station, WDY, at General Electric's Aldene plant in Roselle Park, New Jersey. J. O. Smith and J. Andrew White were the principle operators of WDY, although the station was shut down after just a few months, when RCA decided to join forces with Westinghouse in operating Westinghouse's station in Newark, WJZ. (Some later reviews reported that the WJY transmitter was transferred to be used by WDY, but contemporary reports stated that WDY's transmitter, which was one-third the power of WJY's, had been separately constructed). On May 15, 1923, the WJY call letters were revived and assigned to a new RCA station located in New York City, which was deleted in mid-1927.

With the rapid increase in broadcasting that began in the U.S. in 1922, J. Andrew White became famous as a sports announcer, specializing in boxing matches, and in a 1924 biographical review he was described as "the most famous announcer in radio". In 1927, he became one of the founders, and briefly served as the first president, of the Columbia Broadcasting System and its radio network. White's later recounting of the WJY broadcast tended to expand his role at the expense of others, sometimes contradicting his own earlier statements. Beginning in 1924 he made no mention of Julius Hopp coming up with the plan for the Dempsey-Carpentier broadcast, instead saying the idea had originated with him. In 1955, he additionally claimed that it was his voice, not J. O. Smith's, that listeners heard, stating that a device had been rigged up to carry the sound of his voice from the telephone receiver in Hoboken to the transmitter microphone.

David Sarnoff went on to a stellar career, becoming RCA's president in 1930. His later accounts would also develop significant differences from the contemporary reports. In a 1926 industry overview, Sarnoff also omitted any references to Julius Hopp, and credited J. Andrew White with coming up with the original plan. However, when his authorized biography was published in 1966, it was now Sarnoff who was credited with originating the idea, and it is also implied that it was his idea to link the broadcast to the two charities. In view of his prominence, Sarnoff's version of events has often been the one used by historical reviews.

Julius Hopp would become estranged from his former partners and embittered. In the fall of 1922, he filed a lawsuit against RCA, J. Andrew White, Tex Rickard and Frank Coultry, claiming he had been "defrauded out of the results of his work". In 1927, he filed another lawsuit, again naming Rickard, Coultry and White, that attempted to enjoin them from broadcasting boxing matches from Madison Square Garden, asserting that he was "the first person to perfect and utilize wireless telephone and telegraph for the transmission and broadcasting of sports, news, music, addresses, and news" and demanding an accounting of all profits since July 2, 1921. In December 1935, he sent a letter to David Sarnoff, now president of RCA, that asked for aid due to financial setbacks and illness. Seemingly unaware of the existence of a series of earlier radio broadcasts that had even included boxing matches, Hopp claimed that "I was the originator of the project which has become the world's greatest industry and cultural force, radio broadcasting of news, music, lectures, etc."
