= WDY =

Radio station in Roselle Park, New Jersey (1921–1922)

Coordinates: 40.6596°N 74.2780°W

WDY was an AM radio station located in Roselle Park, New Jersey, that was licensed to the Radio Corporation of America (RCA) from September 19, 1921 to February 20, 1923, although its broadcasting career only spanned the period from December 15, 1921 through February 17, 1922. Despite being short-lived, WDY was the first broadcasting station licensed in the state of New Jersey, and one of the first in the United States. It also marked RCA's entrance into the broadcasting field, which the company would dominate in the U.S. for the next half century.

== History ==
=== Broadcasting development ===
During World War I, civilian radio stations had been banned in the United States. After the end of the war, radio broadcasting, which had previously been done on a limited, mostly experimental basis, began to become better organized, and saw the entrance of major established corporations. In the New York City area, beginning in late 1919, the De Forest Radio Telephone Company transmitted a nightly news and entertainment broadcast over its experimental station, 2XG, located in the Highbridge section of the Bronx, in New York City. However, in early 1920 the local government Radio Inspector shut down 2XG's operation on technical grounds, and Lee de Forest responded by transferring his broadcasting efforts to station 6XC in San Francisco.

In early November 1920, the Westinghouse Electric & Manufacturing Company began operation of its first broadcasting station, KDKA, in East Pittsburgh, Pennsylvania, in order to promote the sale of radio receivers. Following that station's success, Westinghouse made plans to establish additional stations in major population centers.

=== Establishment of WDY ===
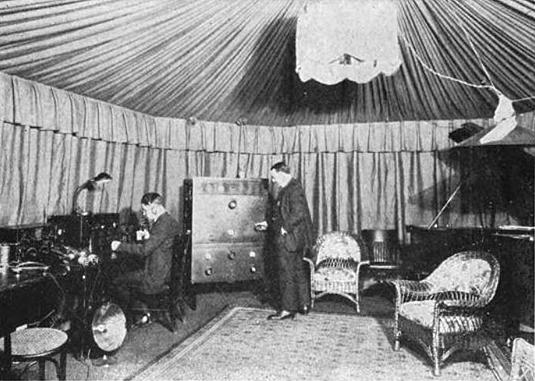
WDY's hexagonal studio, located at General Electric's Aldene plant in Roselle Park, New Jersey, 1922.

RCA, spurred by its then-General Manager David Sarnoff, was also keenly interested in the possibilities of radio broadcasting. On July 2, 1921, it operated a temporary station, WJY, located at Hoboken, New Jersey, to broadcast round-by-round the heavyweight prizefight between Jack Dempsey and Georges Carpentier. The company next worked to establish a more permanent presence, and on September 19, 1921, RCA was issued a license for WDY, with studio and transmitter located at General Electric's (GE) Aldene plant in Roselle Park, New Jersey, and transmitting on a wavelength of 360 meters (833 kHz). (At this time, RCA was a GE subsidiary. The station call letters were randomly assigned and did not stand for anything.)

Although it was announced that WDY would begin operations "around October 15", the station's first broadcast wasn't aired until December 15, 1921. In the meantime, on September 29, 1921, Westinghouse was issued a license for its own broadcasting station, WJZ (now WABC), located at the company's manufacturing plant in Newark, New Jersey, which began regular operations in early October.

WDY's primary staff consisted of manager J. Andrew White, who was also the editor of RCA's Wireless Age magazine, and engineer J. O. Smith, who acted as the station's main announcer. (White and Smith had also been the principal participants in the WJY broadcast). White took responsibility for procuring talent, which was largely drawn from New York City's Manhattan theater district. Two hurdles were the fact that performers were not paid in anything more tangible than a meal and publicity (sometimes including an effusive review in Wireless Age magazine), and they also had to be convinced to travel 16 miles (26 kilometers) from New York to perform in an industrial area with limited train service.

The station facility, located in a converted machine room, was well-financed, and included a 500-watt transmitter constructed by GE engineers. WDY's hexagonal "artistically appointed studio" housed both the performers and the transmitting equipment, and was "furnished in blue and gold draperies; the carpets and rugs carry out the same color scheme. The color scheme is also carried further in the lighting arrangements, a large chandelier in the center of the studio giving a soft, mellow light to the whole place".

Although WDY's license was issued first, it started broadcasting two months after WJZ commenced operations. Because both stations were assigned the same wavelength of 360 meters, they made an arrangement that WDY would broadcast on Monday, Wednesday, and Friday nights, with WJZ operating on the other four days of the week. WDY's divided its schedule into "vocal and instrumental selections by well known artists" on Mondays, "interpretive performances of the popular operas" on Wednesdays, and informal "party nights" on Fridays. Somewhat casual for the time, the station adopted the slogan "The Cute Castle of Cordiality".

The most famous performer to appear over WDY was showman Eddie Cantor, who made his radio debut at the station in early February 1922. Cantor was somewhat suspicious whether his performance, addressed toward a mute microphone, was actually being heard by anybody, so he asked listeners to send in dimes to be donated to charity. The response was enough to convince him about the effectiveness of the new medium. Other prominent performers making their radio premiers included singer Aileen Stanley and actress Norma Shearer.

=== Station shutdown ===
Although RCA had made a significant financial investment in establishing WDY, and its debut and ongoing operations were made with great fanfare, changes in the radio industry soon made the station redundant. RCA, formed in 1919, was originally a wholly owned GE subsidiary. However, on July 1, 1921, GE made an agreement with Westinghouse to cross-license radio patents, which gave Westinghouse 40% ownership of RCA, and also made RCA the sales agent for Westinghouse radio receivers. Because these companies were now working together, there was no longer a need for both WDY and WJZ, moreover, WJZ was located closer to New York City and had been providing a greater variety of programs.

The decision was made to shut down WDY, with RCA now contributing 50% toward WJZ's expenses. WDY made its final broadcast on February 17, 1922, as RCA announced it was combining its broadcasting activities with Westinghouse. A statement in the March 1922 issue of Wireless Age said that WDY's suspension was only temporary, with RCA preparing to reactivate the station "in the heart of New York City", moreover, "When WDY relocates to New York, WJZ will be silenced." However, WDY's license was quietly deleted on February 20, 1923, and when RCA's New York City facility began operations on May 15, 1923, the station actually inherited the WJZ call sign.

In retrospect, WDY was described as a "transition station, almost the equivalent of a tryout of a Broadway play in the provinces", which provided RCA with valuable experience as it developed its broadcasting services.

== See also ==
- List of initial AM-band station grants in the United States
