= Artful Dodger =

Fictional character from the Charles Dickens novel Oliver Twist

The Artful Dodger
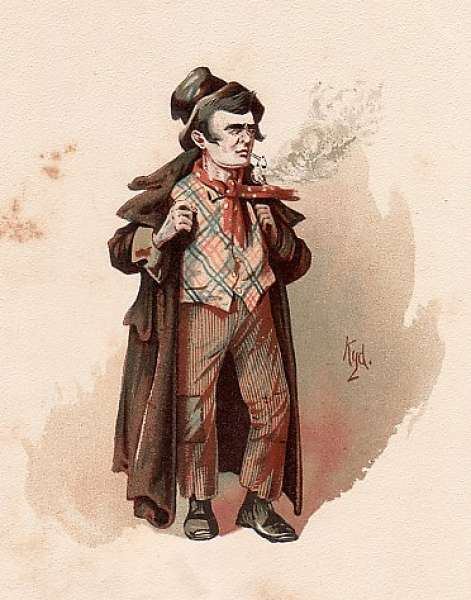
- The Artful Dodger by "Kyd" c. 1890
- Created by: Charles Dickens
- Portrayed by: Edouard Trebaol (1922); Anthony Newley (1948); Melvyn Hayes (1962); Davy Jones (1963); Phil Collins (1964); Jack Wild (1968); Martin Tempest (1982); David Garlick (1985); Elijah Wood (1997); Alex Crowley (1999); Harry Eden (2005); Adam Arnold (2007); Hayley Smith (2011); Kielan Ellis (2014); Kyle Coffman (2015); Wilson Radjou-Pujalte (2016); Rita Ora (2021); Billy Jenkins (2022); Hayden Lawry (2023); Thomas Brodie-Sangster (2023)
- Voiced by: Billy Joel

In-universe information
- Full name: Jack Dawkins
- Gender: Male
- Occupation: Pickpocket
- Nationality: English

Jack Dawkins, better known as the Artful Dodger, is a character in Charles Dickens' 1838 novel Oliver Twist. The Dodger is a pickpocket and his nickname refers to his skill and cunning in that occupation. In the novel, he is the leader of the gang of child criminals on the streets of London trained and overseen by the elderly Fagin. The term has become an idiom describing a person who engages in skillful deception.

== Role in the novel ==
In the novel, Jack becomes Oliver's best friend (though he abandons him when he gets caught) and tries to turn him into a pickpocket, but soon realises that Oliver isn't cut out for it and feels sorry for him, saying "What a pity it is he isn't a prig!" He also has a close friendship with Charley Bates that borders on brotherhood.

The Artful Dodger is characterised as a child who acts like an adult. He is described as wearing adult clothes which are much too large for him. Like an adult, he seldom gives in to childish urges:

The Artful, meantime, who was of a rather saturnine disposition, and seldom gave way to merriment when it interfered with business, rifled Oliver's pockets with steady assiduity.

He was a snub-nosed, flat-browed, common-faced boy enough; and as dirty a juvenile as one would wish to see; but he had about him all the airs and manners of a man. He was short of his age: with rather bow-legs, and little, sharp, ugly eyes. His hat was stuck on the top of his head so lightly, that it threatened to fall off every moment—and would have done so, very often, if the wearer had not had a knack of every now and then giving his head a sudden twitch, which brought it back to its old place again. He wore a man's coat, which reached nearly to his heels. He had turned the cuffs back, half-way up his arm, to get his hands out of the sleeves: apparently with the ultimate view of thrusting them into the pockets of his corduroy trousers; for there he kept them. He was, altogether, as roistering and swaggering a young gentleman as ever stood four feet six, or something less, in the blushers.

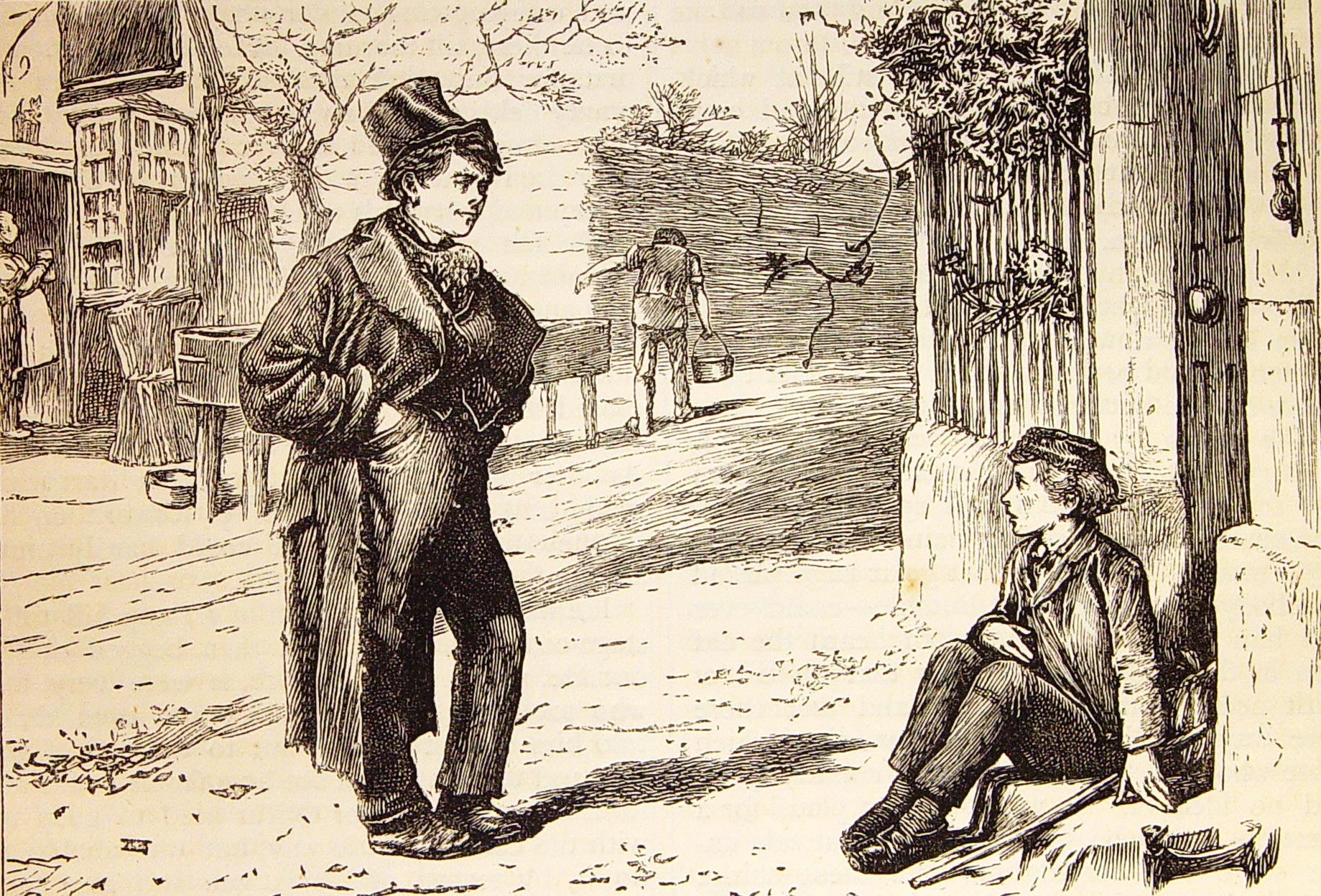
James Mahony's 1871 engraving of the Artful Dodger (left) introducing himself to Oliver as "Jack Dawkins," known as "the artful Dodger". Dodger uses Cockney slang which is juxtaposed with Oliver's 'proper' English.

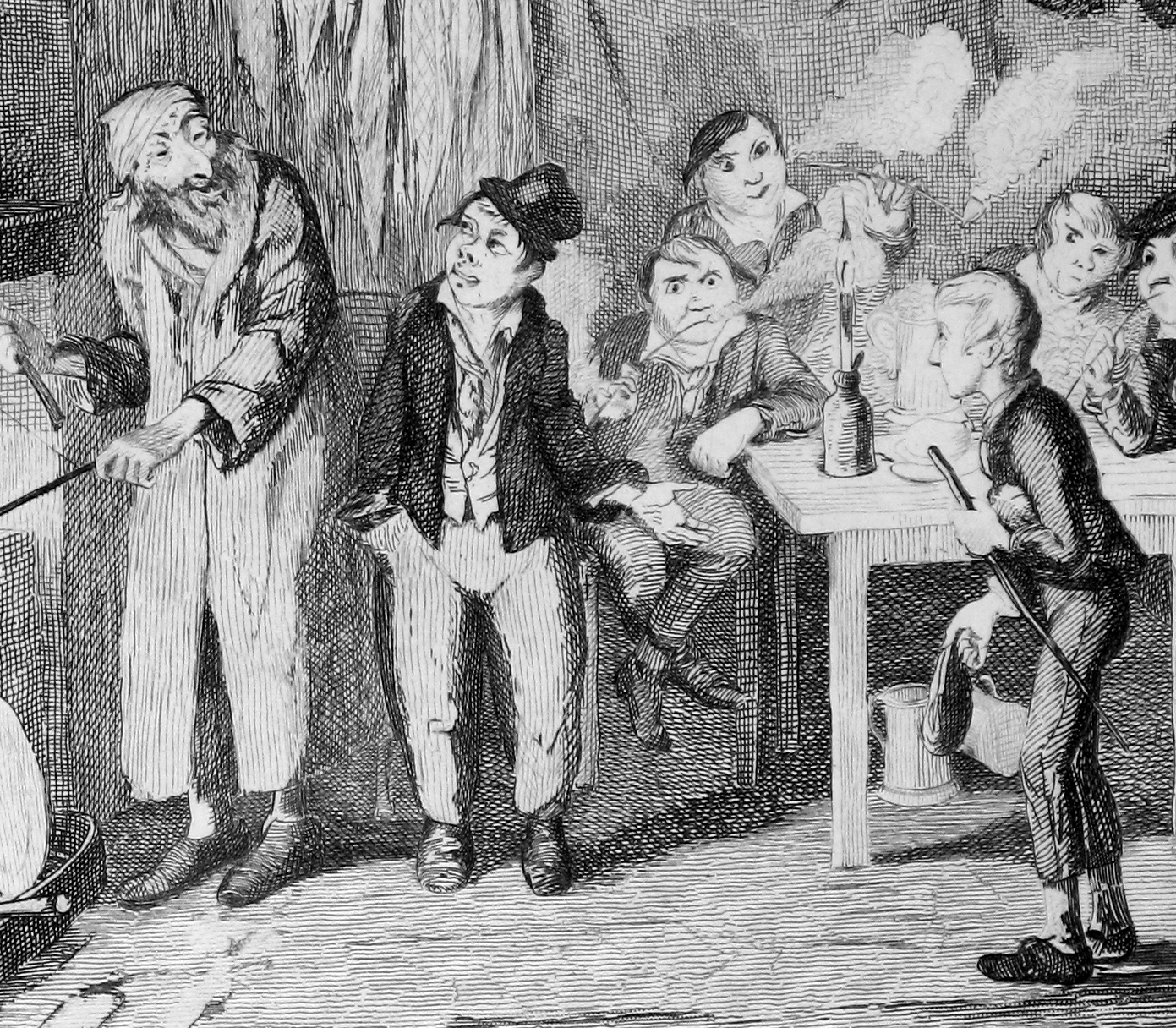
George Cruikshank's original engraving in 1838 of the Artful Dodger (centre), introducing Oliver (right) to Fagin (left). It can be argued that Cruikshank originated the Dodger's trademark top hat – Dickens never specifically describes the hat.

Ultimately the Dodger is caught with a stolen silver snuff box and presumably transported from England to a penal colony in Australia (only alluded to in the novel). The absurdity of the master pickpocket being caught over something so small is remarked upon in the book:

'They've found the gentleman as owns the box; two or three more's a coming to identify him; and the Artful's booked for a passage out', replied Master Bates. 'I must have a full suit of mourning, Fagin, and a hatband, to wist him in, afore he sets out upon his travels. To think of Jack Dawkins—lummy Jack—the Dodger—the Artful Dodger—going abroad for a common twopenny-halfpenny sneeze-box! I never thought he'd a done it under a gold watch, chain, and seals, at the lowest. Oh, why didn't he rob some rich old gentleman of all his valuables, and go out as a gentleman, and not like a common prig, without no honour nor glory!

The Dodger chooses to consider himself a "victim of society", roaring in the courtroom, "I am an Englishman, ain't I? Where are my priwileges?" The jailer tells him "You'll get your privileges soon enough", while the judge has little patience for the Dodger's posturing and orders him out of the courtroom immediately after the jury convicts him of the theft. Dickens describes him this way:

With these last words, the Dodger suffered himself to be led off by the collar, threatening, till he got into the yard, to make a parliamentary business of it, and then grinning in the officer's face, with great glee and self-approval.

Dickens had first used a similar term to "Artful Dodger" in his previous novel, The Pickwick Papers. At the close of Chapter 16, Sam Weller refers to the recent schemes of Mr Jingle: "Reg'lar do, sir; artful dodge."

The Artful Dodger, though a pickpocket, is not a heartless character. He has a great respect for Fagin – "There ain't no teacher like Fagin!" (chapter 3) – to whom he delivers all of the pickpocketing spoils without question.

== Actors who have played the role ==
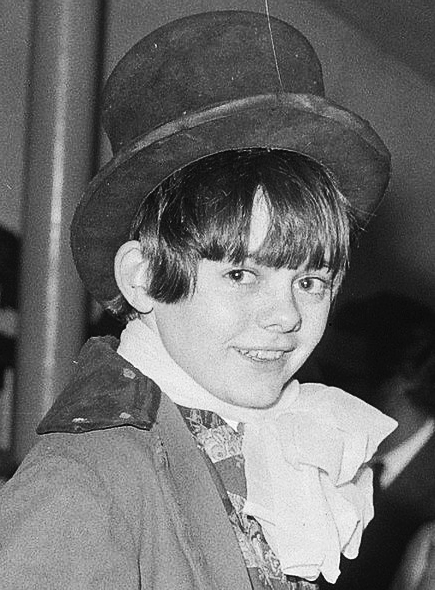
Jack Wild as Dodger in the musical Oliver! (1968). He earned nominations for a BAFTA, a Golden Globe, and an Academy Award for Best Actor in a Supporting Role.

The role of the Artful Dodger has been played by several notable performers in adaptations of the novel.

=== Stage ===
The role of the Artful Dodger was amplified in the musical Oliver!. The part was first played by Martin Horsey, and later by Tony Robinson, Davy Jones, Leonard Whiting, Steve Marriott, and Phil Collins. Others to have played the role in amateur productions include Adam Levine, Ben Elton, Robbie Williams, Joe Jonas, Claire Josefson, and Hayley Smith.

=== Television ===
For the 1962 BBC TV serial, Melvyn Hayes portrayed the character in a manner that reviewers described as faithful to the book's original depiction.

In the 1980 ATV series The Further Adventures of Oliver Twist, the Dodger was played by John Fowler. In this sequel to Oliver Twist, Oliver, who has been sent to a Northern boarding school by Mr. Brownlow, finds that through Oliver's uncle Harry Maylie's intercession the Dodger escaped transportation to Australia and was instead enrolled in the school. The two friends re-unite, and when Oliver flees the school the Dodger follows him back to London after learning of a plot against him. Oliver is made to believe, by Noah Claypole, Noah's girlfriend Charlotte, and Mrs Carraway (Mr Brownlow's corrupt new housekeeper), that Mr. Brownlow is ill to the point of death. After Dodger rescues Oliver from imprisonment in the Brownlow cellar and the two are accused by Mrs. Carraway and Claypole of theft, he and Oliver are forced to take to the streets to uncover the truth, encountering Mr. Bumble, the villainous Monks and their old mentor Fagin (who had escaped execution) along the way; at the series' conclusion, Mr. Brownlow also adopts Dodger as his son along with Oliver.

Elijah Wood also portrayed the character in the 1997 television film, which aired as part of The Wonderful World of Disney on ABC.

In the BBC adaptation of Oliver Twist in 2007, he was played by Adam Arnold.

In the 2023 Hulu series The Artful Dodger, Thomas Brodie-Sangster plays Jack Dawkins—a semi-reformed Artful Dodger in his adulthood—who goes on to become a decorated Navy officer and skilled surgeon, yet remains unable and unwilling to fully escape a life of crime. The series takes place in 1850s Australia, over a decade after the events depicted in Dickens' Oliver Twist.

=== Film ===
Anthony Newley played the character in a 1948 film adaptation of the story.

In the 1968 film Oliver!, Jack Wild played the role and was nominated for an Academy Award for Best Supporting Actor.

The Artful Dodger was played by Harry Eden in Roman Polanski's big-budget 2005 film version.

In the 2021 film Twist, Rita Ora played the role.

== Cultural influences ==
Argentine football player and 1986 FIFA World Cup winning captain Diego Maradona was frequently referred to as the Artful Dodger due to his cunning personality and ability to get away with fouls, such as disguising the illegal use of his hand, as he infamously did when scoring with the "Hand of God".

Condredge Holloway, the quarterback for the University of Tennessee Volunteers (1972–74), was known as "The Artful Dodger" for his scrambling prowess and elusive manner. Holloway was the first African-American starting quarterback in the history of Southeastern Conference football, went on to star in the Canadian Football League from 1975 through 1987, and was inducted into the Canadian Football Hall of Fame in 1999.

== Modern interpretations ==
In Walt Disney Feature Animation's 1988 animated feature film version of Oliver Twist, Oliver & Company, the character of the Artful Dodger was changed to a streetwise mutt simply named Dodger. The voice was provided by musician Billy Joel.

In Saban's Adventures of Oliver Twist, Artful Dodger is voiced by Brianne Siddall and resembles a rabbit.

In 1996, Jean Loup Wolfman played the role in an adaptation by Seth Michael Donsky entitled Twisted. The film is set in a contemporary New York City underground populated by drag queens, drug abusers and hustlers. The Artful Dodger is a gay rent boy and hustler called Arthur, better known among his clientele as "Fine Art". He befriends the Oliver Twist character called Lee (played by Keivyn McNeill Grayes), the latter a black adolescent runaway.

In the first edition of Alan Moore and Kevin O'Neill's comic series League of Extraordinary Gentlemen, set in 1898 London, the Dodger briefly appears as an elderly man running his own gang of boy thieves, hinting that he is still following in Fagin's footsteps.

In 2001, the Artful Dodger was the subject of an Australian children's show called Escape of the Artful Dodger. The show followed the Artful Dodger's adventures in the Australian penal colony in New South Wales, as well as his eventual redemption. Oliver Twist and Fagin also appeared.

In the 2003 film Twist, the Artful Dodger is called Dodge and is played by Nick Stahl. The film is told from his point of view, in which he is a drug addict influenced by Fagin.

In the 2010 Doctor Who audio drama Legend of the Cybermen, the Artful Dodger is one of the characters seen in the land of fiction. He was voiced by Steven Kynman.

In Tony Lee's 2011 novel Dodge & Twist, set twelve years after the events of Oliver Twist, Dodger has returned to England a changed man from his time in Australia, and is planning a heist. However he cannot escape the 'ghost' of Fagin, who still guides his actions, even past the grave.

In Terry Pratchett's 2012 novel Dodger, the title character bears certain similarities to the Dickens character. The sampler of the book also includes him meeting an astute gentleman who concerns himself with the well-being of the poor called Charlie Dickens.

A 2014 novel by Peter David, Artful, features the Artful Dodger as the main character, and depicts his life following the events of Oliver Twist, which includes confrontations with vampires, one of whom is revealed to be Fagin. The storyline of that novel was continued in a comic book series of the same name.

In the late 2015 BBC series Dickensian, the Artful Dodger is portrayed by Wilson Radjou-Pujalte.

In the 2021 film Twist, the Artful Dodger is gender-flipped into a woman and played by Rita Ora.

In the 2022 CBBC series, Dodger, the Artful Dodger is portrayed by Billy Jenkins.

In the 2023 TV series The Artful Dodger, which is set in 1850s Australia, the titular character is portrayed by Thomas Brodie-Sangster.
