= Jean Loup Wolfman =

American actor

- Born: January 23, 1969 (age 56); Greenwich Village, New York
- Occupation: Actor Model

Jean Loup Wolfman (born January 23, 1969) is an American actor, appearing in film, theater, television and commercials.

== Childhood ==
Wolfman was born and raised in New York City by his mother Janet Wolfman. He grew up in downtown Greenwich Village.

== Career ==
Wolfman's first appearance on the New York theater stage was as a baby in Goldfinger at the La Mama theater.

His other New York stage appearances include Shakespeare's Titus Andronicus, later turned into the film Titus by the director Julie Taymor; Orestes by En Garde Arts; a number of off-Broadway productions of Shakespeare; and various musical roles in summer stock productions.

On television, he appeared for part of a season as Bruce Dreyfuss on the soap opera As the World Turns and appeared in an episode of The Cosby Show.

Wolfman appeared in the film Twisted, directed by Seth Michael Donsky, which was based on Charles Dickens' book Oliver Twist. He plays the hustler character Arthur 'Fine Art', based on the Artful Dodger.

He also appeared in the 2007 film The Lucky Man starring Frank Vincent and Vincent Pastore, and had a walk-on role in the film Broadway Damage.

He has modelled for Levi's, Nike, Gap, and Bad Boy. He has also appeared in commercials for Levi's, Coca-Cola, Pepsi (with MC Hammer), and ATT.

== Filmography ==
- 1996: Twisted
- 2007: The Lucky Man
