= Pedder =

Pedder may refer to

== Persons ==
- John Pedder (c1520−1571), English priest
- John Lewes Pedder (1784–1859), Chief Justice of Tasmania

== Geography ==
- Pedder's Hill, a hill west of Government Hill in Hong Kong
- Pedder station, now part of Central MTR station in Hong Kong
- Pedder Street in Central, Hong Kong
- Lake Pedder, lake Tasmania, Australia

== Animal ==
- Pedder galaxias, Australian freshwater fish
