= Father Brown (2013 TV series) =

British television period mystery series

- Genre: Cosy mystery; Detective fiction; Comedy drama; Period drama
- Based on: Father Brown by G. K. Chesterton
- Developed by: Rachel Flowerday; Tahsin Guner
- Starring: Mark Williams; Sorcha Cusack; Hugo Speer; Kasia Koleczek; Tom Chambers; Nancy Carroll; Alex Price; Jack Deam; John Burton; Emer Kenny; Claudie Blakley; Ruby-May Martinwood
- Theme music composer: Debbie Wiseman
- Opening theme: Father Brown theme
- Country of origin: United Kingdom
- Original language: English
- No. of series: 13
- No. of episodes: 140 (list of episodes)

Production
- Executive producers: Will Trotter; John Yorke; Neil Irvine
- Producers: Ceri Meyrick; Caroline Slater; Peter Bullock
- Cinematography: Stuart Biddlecombe
- Running time: 45–50 minutes
- Production company: BBC Studios Drama Productions

Original release
- Network: BBC One
- Release: 14 January 2013 – present

Related
- Sister Boniface Mysteries

Father Brown is a British period detective television series loosely based on the Father Brown short stories by G. K. Chesterton, starring Mark Williams as the titular crime-solving Catholic priest. Broadcast began on BBC One on 14 January 2013. In April 2023 the BBC confirmed that filming had begun on an 11th series, for broadcast in January 2024, and also confirmed the return of Lorna Watson as Sister Boniface. The commissioning of series 12 and 13 was confirmed in April 2024.

== Synopsis ==
The series is set in England during the early 1950s. Father Brown is the priest at St Mary's Catholic Church in the fictional village of Kembleford, located in the Cotswolds. At the end of series 3, it is August 1953 and in series 12, the year is now 1955.

Britain is struggling with the aftermath of the Second World War and rationing is still in effect. The coronation of Queen Elizabeth II has taken place, the death penalty has not yet been abolished and homosexuality and abortion are still illegal. An empathetic man of keen intelligence, Father Brown solves murder cases when members of his parish are involved, when circumstances are strange enough to gain his interest, or when he is directly asked for help. During his investigations, he occasionally neglects his more mundane parish duties.

He is often helped by the parish secretary, Bridgette McCarthy (Series 1–9), and his housekeeper, Susie Jasinski (Series 1 only). He is also sometimes aided by socialite Lady Felicia Montague, her driver Sid Carter (a former criminal) and her niece Bunty Windermere. From series 10 onwards, he is aided by Isabel Sullivan (formerly Isabel Devine), his new parish secretary and Brenda Palmer, his housekeeper.

Father Brown's interest in local cases and his habit of offering advice and pointing out clues often annoy the local police inspector. Father Brown holds no animosity towards the police, but he often embarrasses them with his investigations.

During World War I, Father Brown served in the British Army's Gloucestershire Regiment; he served with the same regiment in World War II as a chaplain. His experiences as a veteran, along with his vocation as a priest, give him great insight into human nature as well as a desire to offer forgiveness and redemption, wishing to serve his concept of justice rather than strictly following the letter of the law and condemning the guilty. Father Brown is obedient to the seal of confession in the Catholic Church. When confronting criminals, he sometimes offers to hear their explanations and confessions without judgment. While he then urges them to admit their crimes to the authorities and accept responsibility, he also promises he will not reveal their actions or prevent their escape if they choose otherwise but he will only interfere if they will do something to harm others.

He frequently travels by bicycle, which he refers to as Bucephalus in series 2 ("The Three Tools of Death”).

== Characters ==
=== Overview ===
Actor	Character	Series												
Actor	Character	Series 1	Series 2	Series 3	Series 4	Series 5	Series 6	Series 7	Series 8	Series 9	Series 10	Series 11	Series 12	Series 13
Mark Williams	Father Brown	Main	Main	Main	Main	Main	Main	Main	Main	Main	Main	Main	Main	Main
Sorcha Cusack	Mrs. Bridgette McCarthy	Main	Main	Main	Main	Main	Main	Main	Main	Main				Guest
Hugo Speer	Inspector/Chief Inspector Walter Valentine	Main	Guest						Guest					
Nancy Carroll	Lady Felicia Montague	Recurring	Main	Main	Main	Guest	Guest	Guest	Guest	Guest	Guest	Guest	Guest	Guest
Alex Price	Sidney "Sid" Carter	Recurring	Main	Main	Main	Guest	Guest		Guest	Main				
Kasia Koleczek	Zuzanna "Susie" Jasinski	Recurring												
Keith Osborn	Sergeant Albright	Recurring	Recurring											
Tom Chambers	Inspector/Chief Inspector Edgar Sullivan		Main	Main				Guest	Guest		Main	Main	Main	Main
John Burton	Sergeant Daniel Goodfellow		Recurring	Recurring	Recurring	Main	Main	Main	Main	Main	Main	Main	Main	Main
Jack Deam	Inspector Gerald "Gerry" Mallory				Main	Main	Main	Main	Main	Main				
Emer Kenny	The Honourable Penelope "Bunty" Windermere					Main	Main	Main	Main	Guest				
Ruby-May Martinwood	Brenda Palmer									Guest	Main	Main	Main	Main
Claudie Blakley	Mrs. Isabel Devine										Main	Main	Main	Main
John Light	Hercule Flambeau	Recurring	Recurring	Recurring	Recurring	Recurring	Recurring	Recurring	Recurring	Recurring	Recurring	Recurring	Recurring	Recurring

=== Main cast ===
- Father Brown – Mark Williams (2013–present): a slightly rumpled, shambolic, and mild-mannered Catholic priest who, if appearance were the only consideration, would be easily forgotten. His apparent innocence belies a playful wit and a razor-sharp intellect. His greatest strength, both as a priest and as a detective of crime, is his love and understanding of other people. He is not there to judge but to save souls. He is a veteran of both the First and the Second World War, having served with the Gloucestershire Regiment on each occasion (as an infantryman in the first war and as a Catholic chaplain in the second).
- Mrs. Bridgette McCarthy née Maguire – Sorcha Cusack (2013–2022 as a lead character, 2026 as a guest): the Irish parish secretary at St Mary's. She checks the facts for Father Brown, acts as his confidante on official Church business and everything else, is steadfastly loyal to Father Brown, and defends him from the ire of the congregation; she also makes sure he eats. She is instinctively narrow-minded and conformist, adhering to the simplest version of Church dogma, but usually eventually finds herself able to reconcile forgiveness with her sense of justice. She has a tendency to brag about her award-winning strawberry scones. Mrs. McCarthy is a frequent gossip – though claims she is not – and shares a love/hate relationship with Lady Felicia, although both women eventually admit to being close friends.
- Lady Felicia Montague née Windermere – Nancy Carroll (2013 as a recurring character, 2014–2016 as a lead character, 2017–present as a guest): a glamorous but bored socialite who comes from an old and noble recusant family. She is also known as the Countess of Montague by virtue of her marriage to the Earl of Montague, whom she calls "Monty." She supports many local charitable activities and resides at a grand stately home named Montague Hall. Lady Felicia is unhappy with her husband's aloofness toward her and has a roving eye when her husband is away which he usually is. She is a staunch ally of Father Brown and frequent nemesis of Mrs. McCarthy despite grudging respect between the women.
- Sidney "Sid" Carter – Alex Price (2013 as a recurring character, 2014–2016, 2022 as a lead character): An artful dodger, Sid is an occasional black marketeer, part-time crook and informant who becomes Lady Felicia's chauffeur. Father Brown makes him the church handyman while trying to keep him on the straight and narrow. He has a unique talent for being able to talk his way into any situation in order to help Father Brown search for the truth. During his time in Kembleford, he manages to gain the trust and respect of both Father Brown and Mrs. McCarthy who come to value him as a close friend.
- Zuzanna "Susie" Jasinski – Kasia Koleczek (2013): Father Brown's part-time housekeeper who lives in a nearby post-war Polish resettlement camp. Her true first name was revealed in the episode "The Eye of Apollo."
- The Honourable Penelope "Bunty" Windermere – Emer Kenny (2017–2020 as a lead character, 2022 as a guest): the wayward niece of Lady Felicia (the daughter of her brother Viscount Windermere) seeking refuge after being photographed leaving a sleazy nightclub with a married man and cited in divorce proceedings. She has had to adapt to life in Kembleford and has become a close friend of both Father Brown and Mrs McCarthy whom she often refers to as simply "Mrs. M."
- Inspector/Chief Inspector Walter Valentine – Hugo Speer (2013–2014 as a lead character, 2020 as a guest): head of the local police force who finds himself constantly torn between secret admiration for Father Brown and deep frustration with him. He would like to collaborate, but has been burnt once too often by Brown's unorthodox moral code. Nevertheless, he comes to respect Brown's methods and even admits that he might miss the priest when he is promoted to Detective Chief Inspector and moves to London.
- Inspector/Chief Inspector Edgar Sullivan – Tom Chambers (2014–2015, 2023–present as a lead character, 2019-2020 as a guest): replaced Inspector Valentine at the start of the second series. Like Valentine, Sullivan is also exasperated by Father Brown's meddling, but is eventually won over. He returns as a main character in Series 10 after Mallory's departure. After initially wishing to return to London, he stays in Kembleford with his new love Isabel and they marry in the 2025 finale.
- Inspector Gerald "Gerry" Mallory – Jack Deam (2016–2022): replaces Inspector Sullivan. Like his predecessors, he is often exasperated by Father Brown whom he sarcastically calls "Padre" (in reference to Brown having been a military chaplain). However, he is a far more open-minded, and occasionally resourceful, detective who chases after leads with great enthusiasm even when they lead him to the wrong conclusion.
- Sergeant Albright – Keith Osborn (2013–2014): played dogsbody to Inspectors Valentine and Sullivan.
- Sergeant Daniel Goodfellow – John Burton (2014–present): continued playing the dogsbody for the Inspector with increasing involvement.
- Hercule Flambeau – John Light (2013–present): the nemesis of Father Brown; a jewel and art thief who seems to be without conscience. He and Father Brown have encountered each other at least once in every series.
- Brenda Palmer – Ruby-May Martinwood (2022 as a guest, 2023 – 2026 as a lead character): a young woman who becomes the new housekeeper at St. Mary's. She made her first appearance in the series 9 episode "The Wayward Girls" before returning as a regular in series 10. She leaves at the end of series 13 to become Father Lindsay's parish secretary.
- Mrs. Isabel Sullivan (previously Devine) – Claudie Blakley (2023–present): a widowed enthusiast for mysteries who is Mrs. McCarthy's replacement as parish secretary. She is in a not-so-secret relationship with Chief Inspector Sullivan and they marry in the 2025 finale.

=== Recurring roles ===
- Bishop Talbot – Malcolm Storry (2013–2015): appeared in three episodes. Talbot is Father Brown's superior and does not like his sleuthing but respects him for solving the mysteries. In "The Daughter of Autolycus", his death was mentioned. He is succeeded by Bishop Reynard (Michael Pennington).
- Harold "Blind 'Arry" Slow – Alan Williams (2017–2020): appeared in six episodes. Slow is the rag-and-bone man for Kembleford and also a drunk. In "The Darkest Noon", he mentions that he got the nickname "Blind 'Arry" after being gassed in the First World War, and he also mentions that he was a sapper. He wears several rows of medal ribbons and multiple loose medals, suggesting – if authentic – a distinguished previous military career.
- Professor Hilary Ambrose – James Laurenson (2014–2017): appeared in two episodes. Ambrose is a theological scholar and friend of Father Brown.
- Bishop Damien Fox – Roger May (2016–present): appears in five episodes. He was a canon of the Diocese and reported to Bishop Reynard. Fox takes a dim view of Father Brown's unconventional ways and tries to get him fired / seconded to Scotland. He becomes bishop in the 2026 finale.
- Katherine Corven – Kate O'Flynn (2017–2018): appeared in two episodes. In "The Eagle and the Daw", she was in prison for murdering her husband. Father Brown had helped to convict her and was awaiting her execution. In "The Jackdaw's Revenge", she leaves prison and joins a nunnery whilst plotting revenge against Father Brown. At the culmination of the episode, she kidnaps Bunty and gets shot in a case of mistaken identity.
- Daniel Whittaker – Daniel Flynn (2015–2018): appeared in two episodes. Whittaker is a ruthless MI5 agent who blackmails Lady Felicia. In "The Man in the Shadows", he had Sid arrested on false charges after he entered an MI5 room.
- Marianne Delacroix – Gina Bramhill (2016–2020). Flambeau's daughter who is equally adept at theft. Two episodes.
- Gerald Firth/Kalon – Michael Maloney (2013–2022). Founder and leader of the cult-like Church of Apollo. Two episodes.

Series 1 cast (left to right): Nancy Carroll, Sorcha Cusack, Mark Williams, Hugo Speer, Kasia Koleczek and Alex Price

=== Notes ===
- In Series 9, only Mark Williams and John Burton appear in all episodes. Nancy Carroll (2 episodes), Sorcha Cusack (8 episodes), Jack Deam (9 episodes), Emer Kenny (2 episodes) and Alex Price (6 episodes) receive main cast credits only for the episodes in which they appear.
- Oliver Ford Davies is the only actor to appear in both the 1974 series and the 2013 series.
- Jo Stone-Fewings, the real-life husband of Nancy Carroll, featured in a guest role in the 2016 episode "The Daughter of Autolycus". Carroll and Stone-Fewings did not share any scenes in the episode.
- Niamh Cusack, who is the sister of Sorcha Cusack, played Mrs. McCarthy's sister Roisin in the 2020 episode "The Numbers of the Beast". Sorcha Cusack's husband, Nigel Cooke, also featured in one episode.

== Conception ==
BBC Daytime wanted a home-grown detective series for the weekday afternoons on BBC One. Original ideas from writers were pitched, but the BBC wanted something that was less risky and already well-known. Father Brown had not been produced for British television since the 1974 production for ITV starring Kenneth More. Executive Producer John Yorke came up with the idea after hearing a radio documentary about G. K. Chesterton presented by Ann Widdecombe.

Writers were given the choice of adapting an existing story or coming up with an original idea. The Chesterton stories were set all over the world and at different times. Although half of the episodes in the first series were loosely based on the Chesterton stories, a decision was made to restrict the programme's location and date.

The Cotswolds was chosen because it had few modern buildings and was close to the production base in Birmingham. The 1950s were chosen because the detective could solve puzzles using his mind and knowledge of human nature instead of relying on modern technology. Despite this, the script sometimes includes anachronistic language (e.g., "secure the crime scene", "mojo"). The lead writers, Rachel Flowerday and Tahsin Guner, created the supporting characters. Other writers contributed stand-alone scripts that were not part of a story arc.

== Production ==
The series is a BBC Studios Birmingham Drama Village production and filming for the first series of ten episodes of Father Brown began in the Cotswolds in summer 2012. The BBC renewed Father Brown for a second series of ten episodes in 2013. A third series of 15 episodes was commissioned in 2014. A fourth series of ten episodes was commissioned in 2015.

=== Filming ===
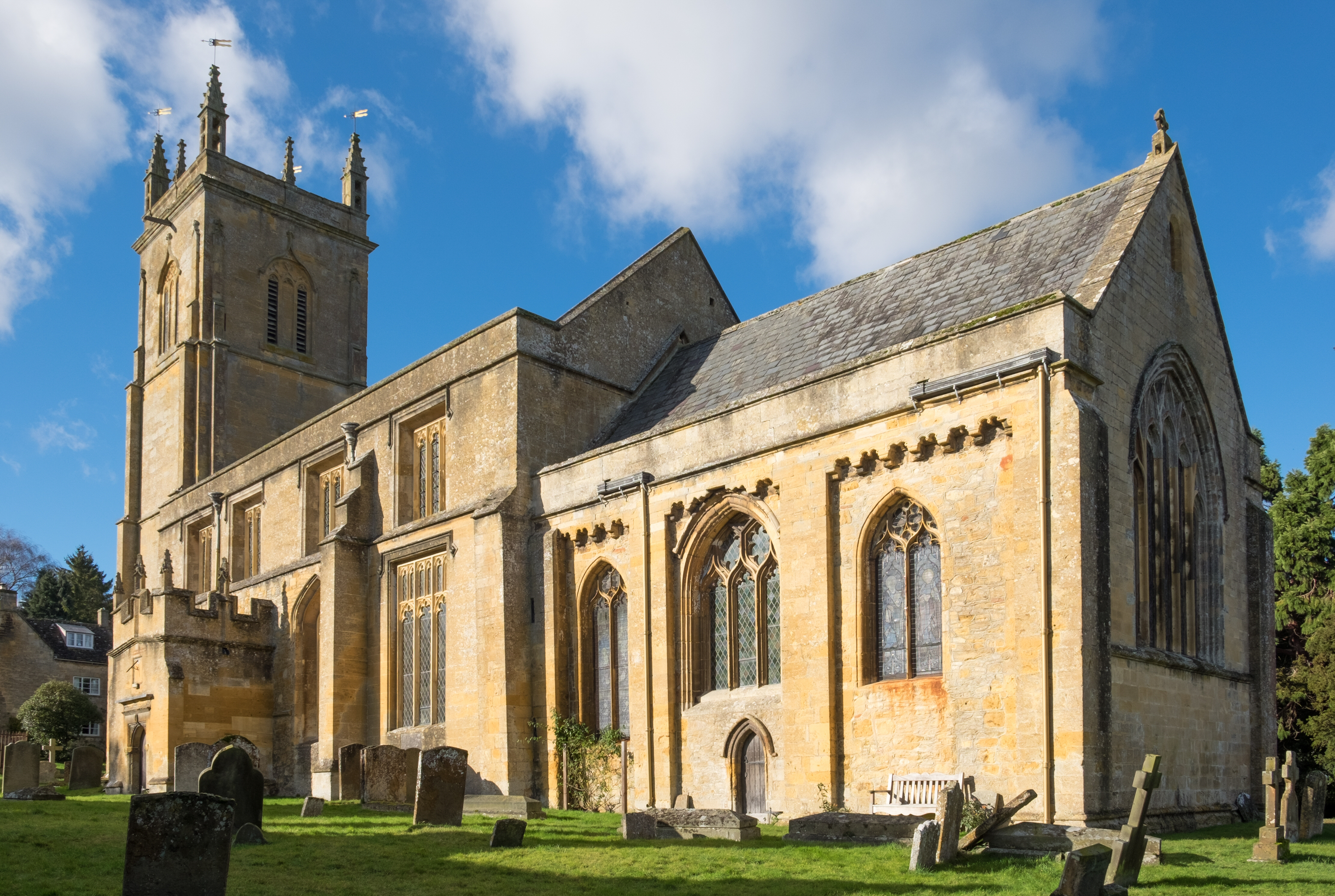
Church of St Peter and St Paul, Blockley

Filming takes place in the Gloucestershire village of Blockley using the Church of St Peter and St Paul, Blockley (Church of England) as the St Mary Catholic Church of the series and the vicarage transformed into the presbytery for Father Brown's residence. Other villages used are Winchcombe, Upper Slaughter, Kemerton and Guiting Power. Filming also took place at Winchcombe railway station and Toddington railway station on the heritage Gloucestershire Warwickshire Railway. Sudeley Castle was the main location for "The Eye of Apollo". Princethorpe College, once a Catholic convent, now a secondary school, was used as St Agnes Convent in "The Bride of Christ" (2013).

Filming for the second series included the Warwickshire village of Ilmington. Chastleton House and Berkeley Castle were used to portray Pryde Castle in the episode broadcast on 8 January 2014. Kenilworth Castle in Warwickshire provided the location for the final resting place of the famed rosary in the episode "Mysteries of the Rosary" (2014). The gardens at Snowshill Manor featured in the same episode. The episode "The Time Machine", in series 3, was based around the Warwickshire estate of Alscot Park.

Filming has also taken place at Ashdown WW2 Camp, Evesham, Worcestershire, where the TV series Land Girls also was filmed. Laid out as a WW2 camp, Ashdown Camp is made up of 11 Nissen huts, air raid shelters, and outbuildings. Also used were the 1930s portion of Shire Hall, Warwick, headquarters of Warwickshire County Council; Bloxham School in Oxfordshire; and Worcester Guildhall. The former hospital at Moreton-in-Marsh was used for the new police station and for Father Brown's kitchen, study and presbytery.

=== Locations ===
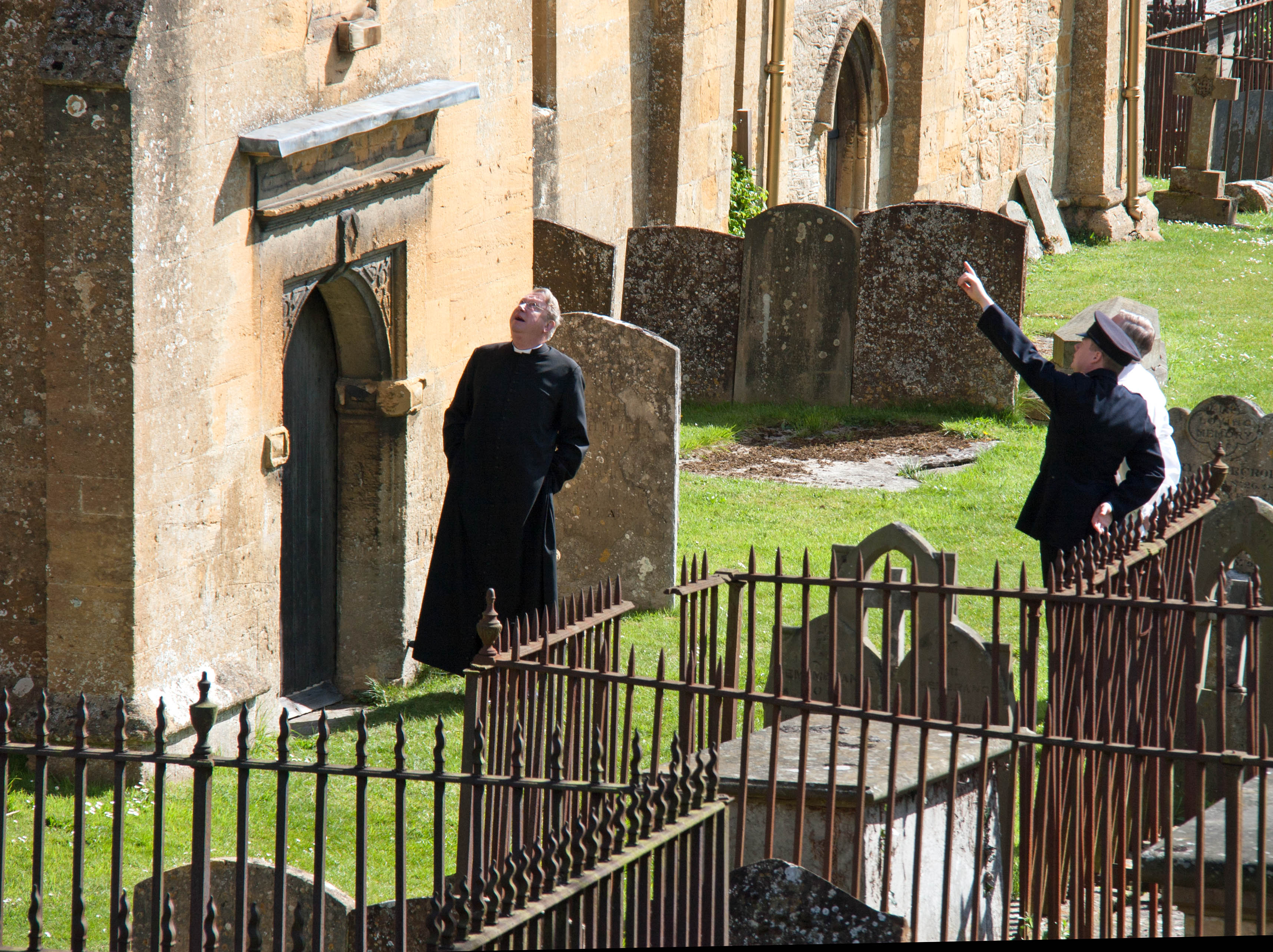
Filming in Blockley Churchyard

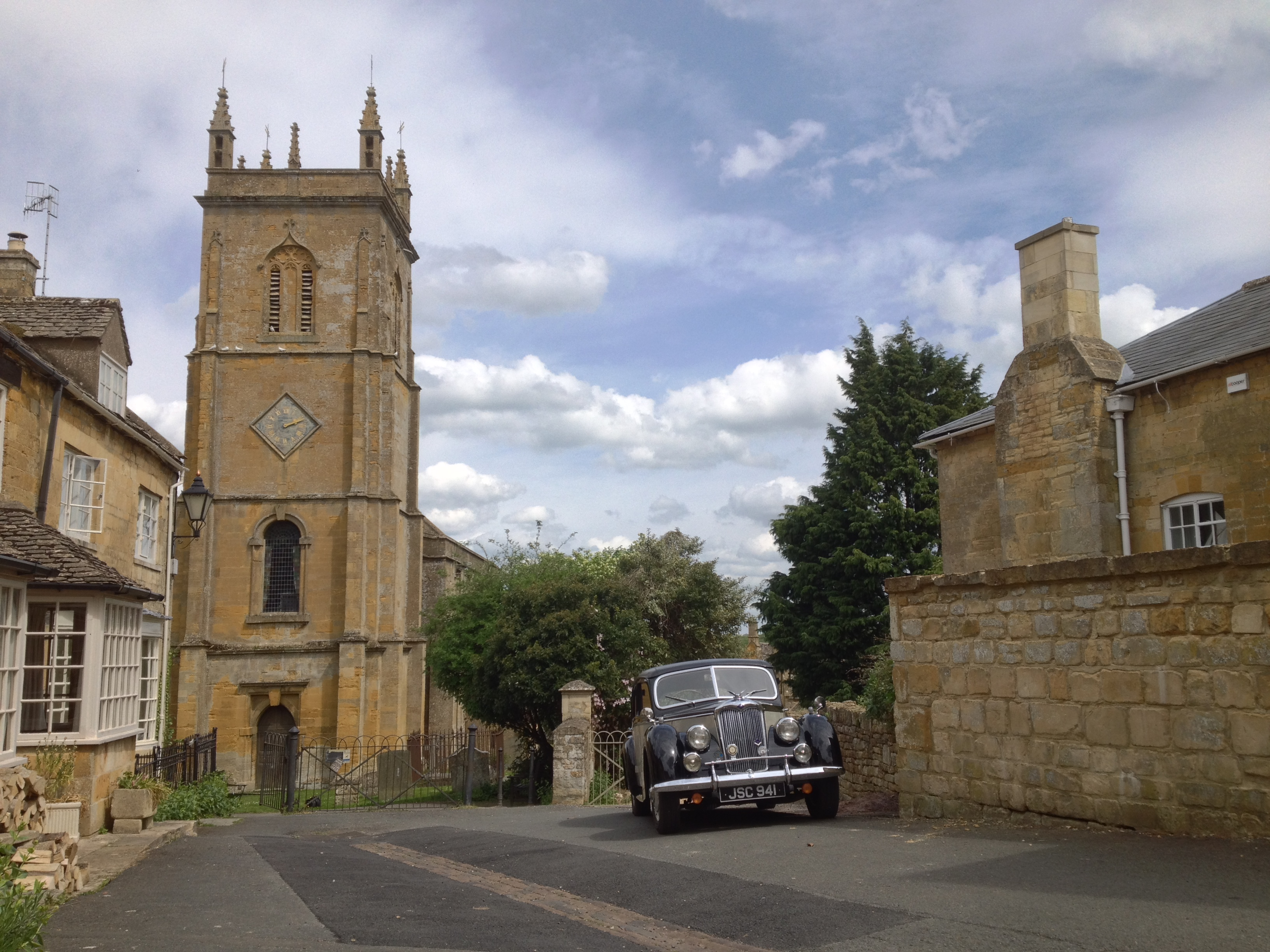
St Peter & St Paul Church, Blockley and the Riley RMA used for filming Father Brown

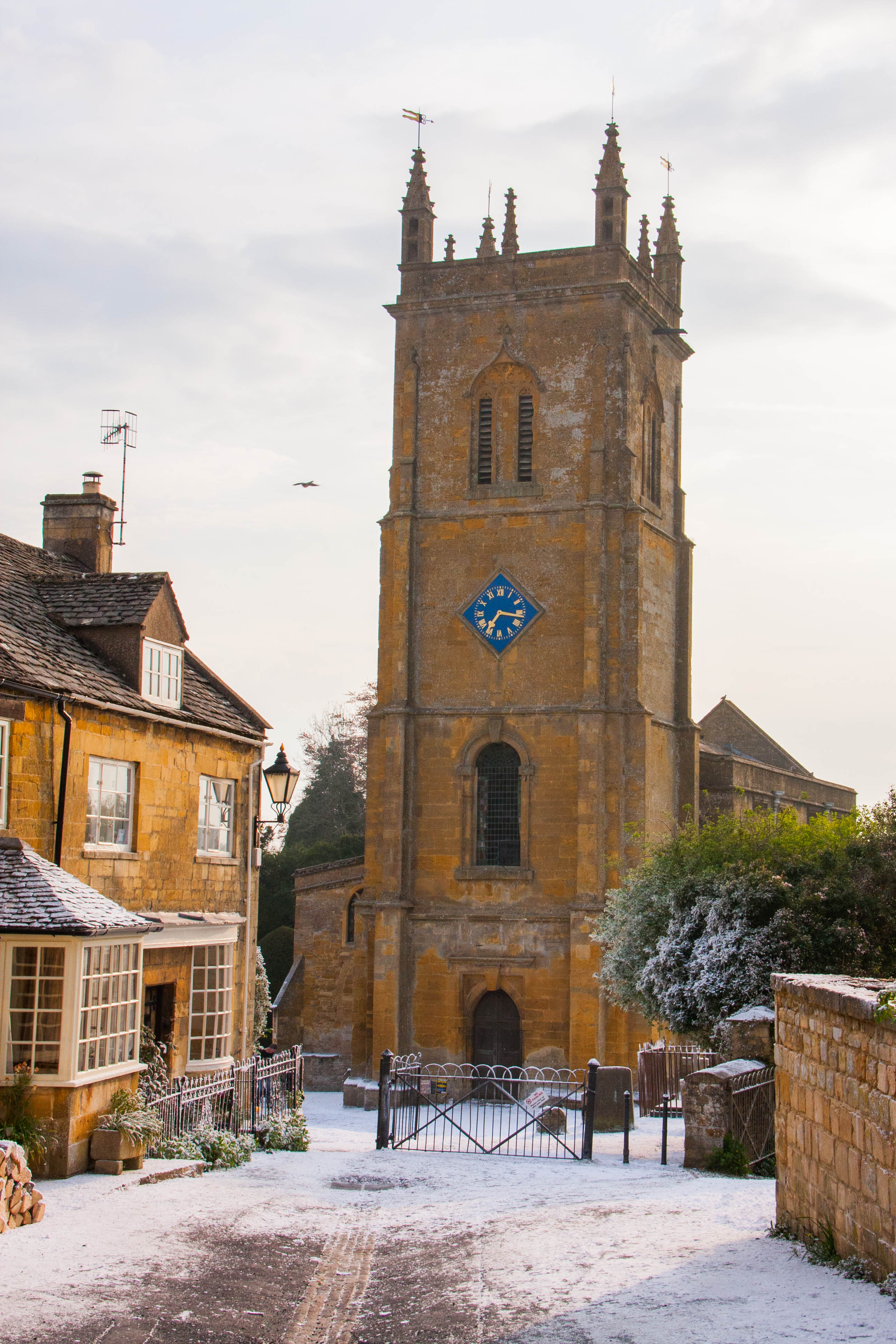
Blockley Church with artificial snow (2016 Christmas Special)

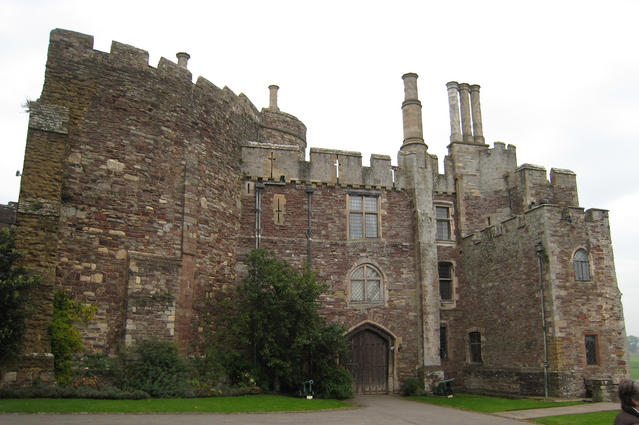
Berkeley Castle, Gloucestershire

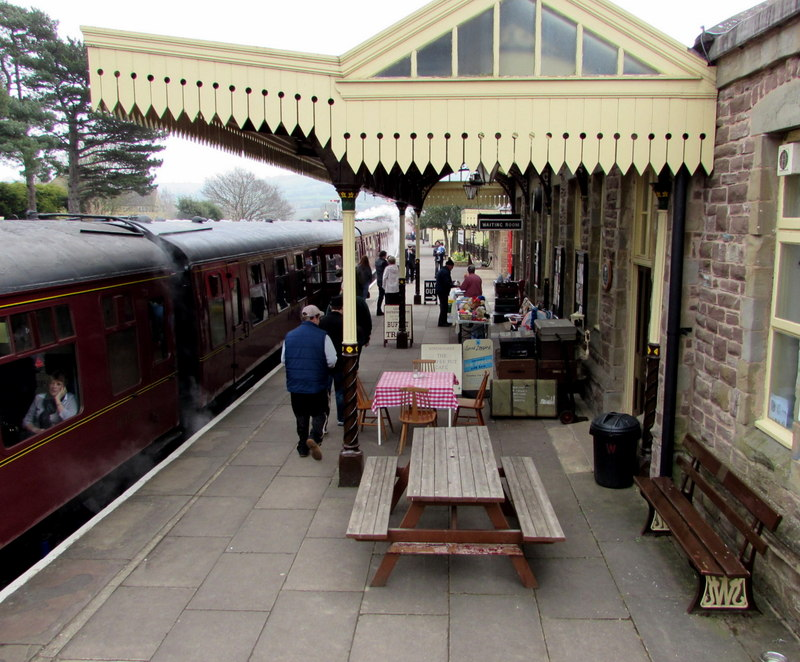
Winchcombe railway station

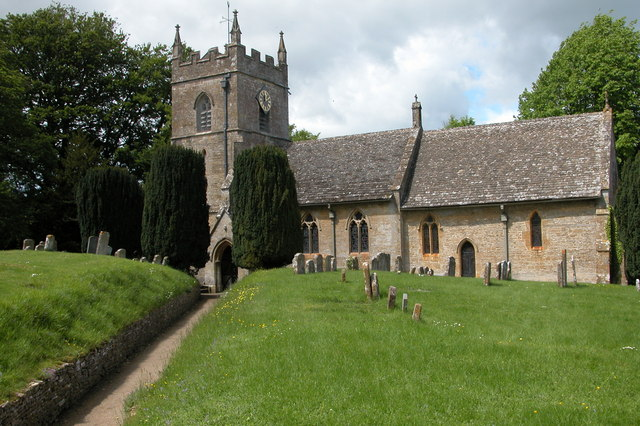
St Peter's Church in Upper Slaughter doubled as the Anglican church in Kembleford

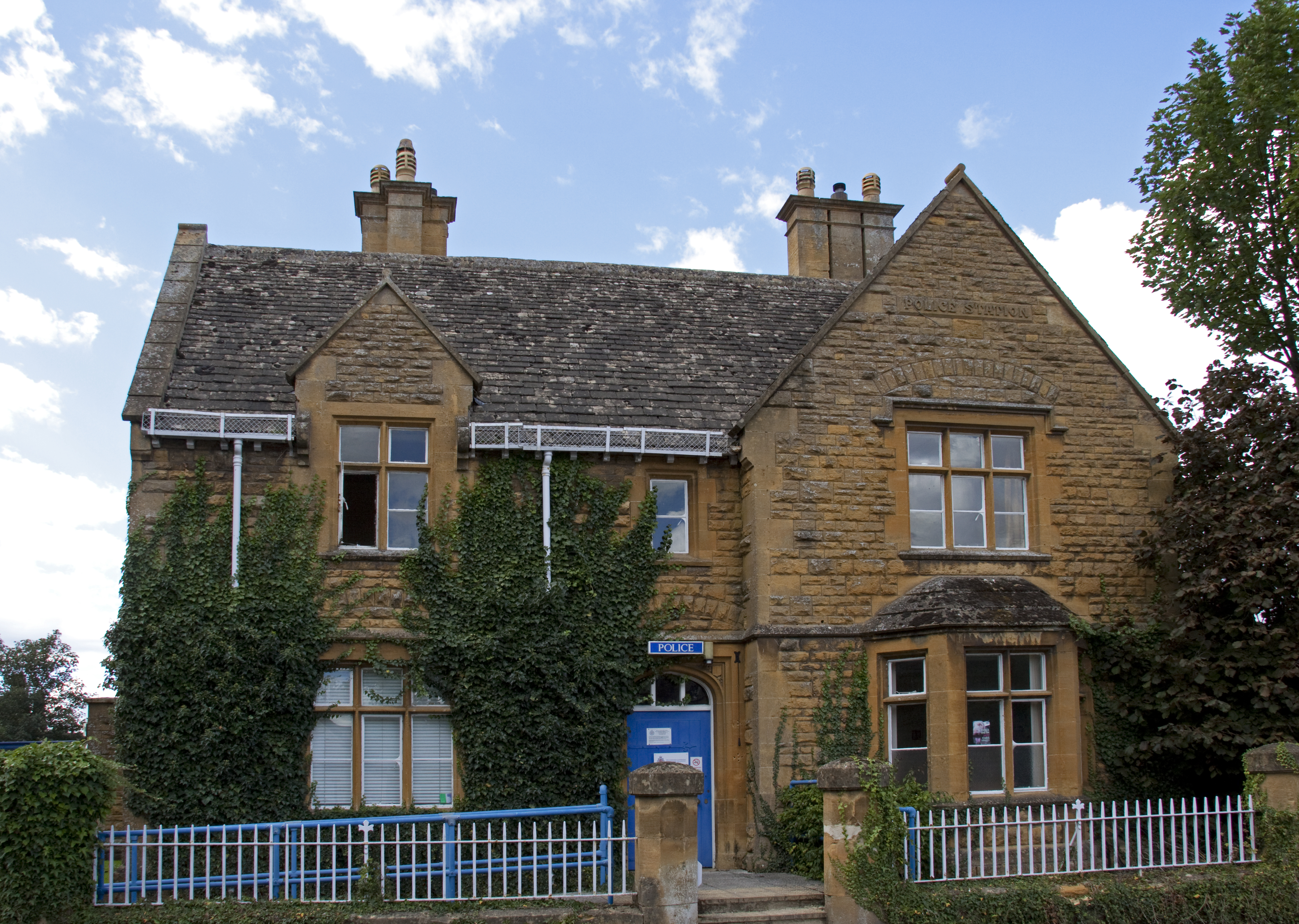
The old Moreton-in-Marsh police station featured as Kembleford police station

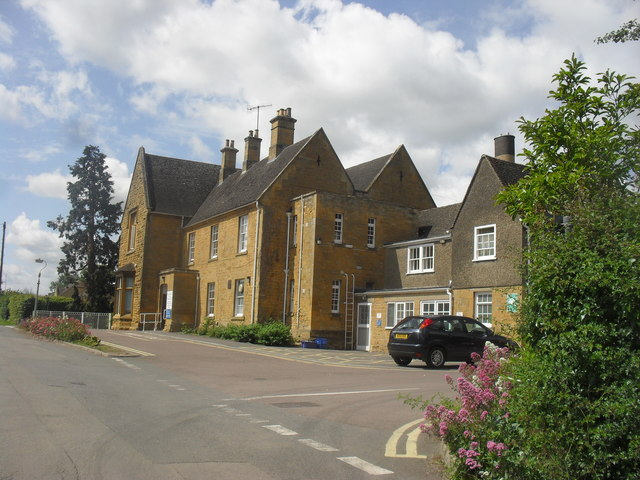
The old Moreton-in-Marsh hospital was the new Kembleford police station

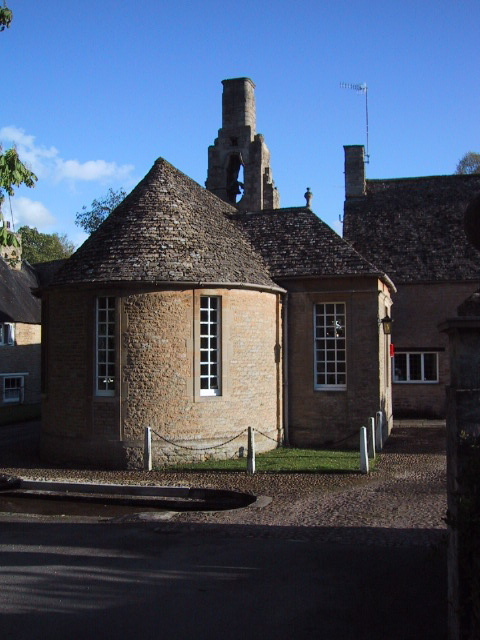
Village centre and village hall at Cornwell (Kembleford police station in series 5)

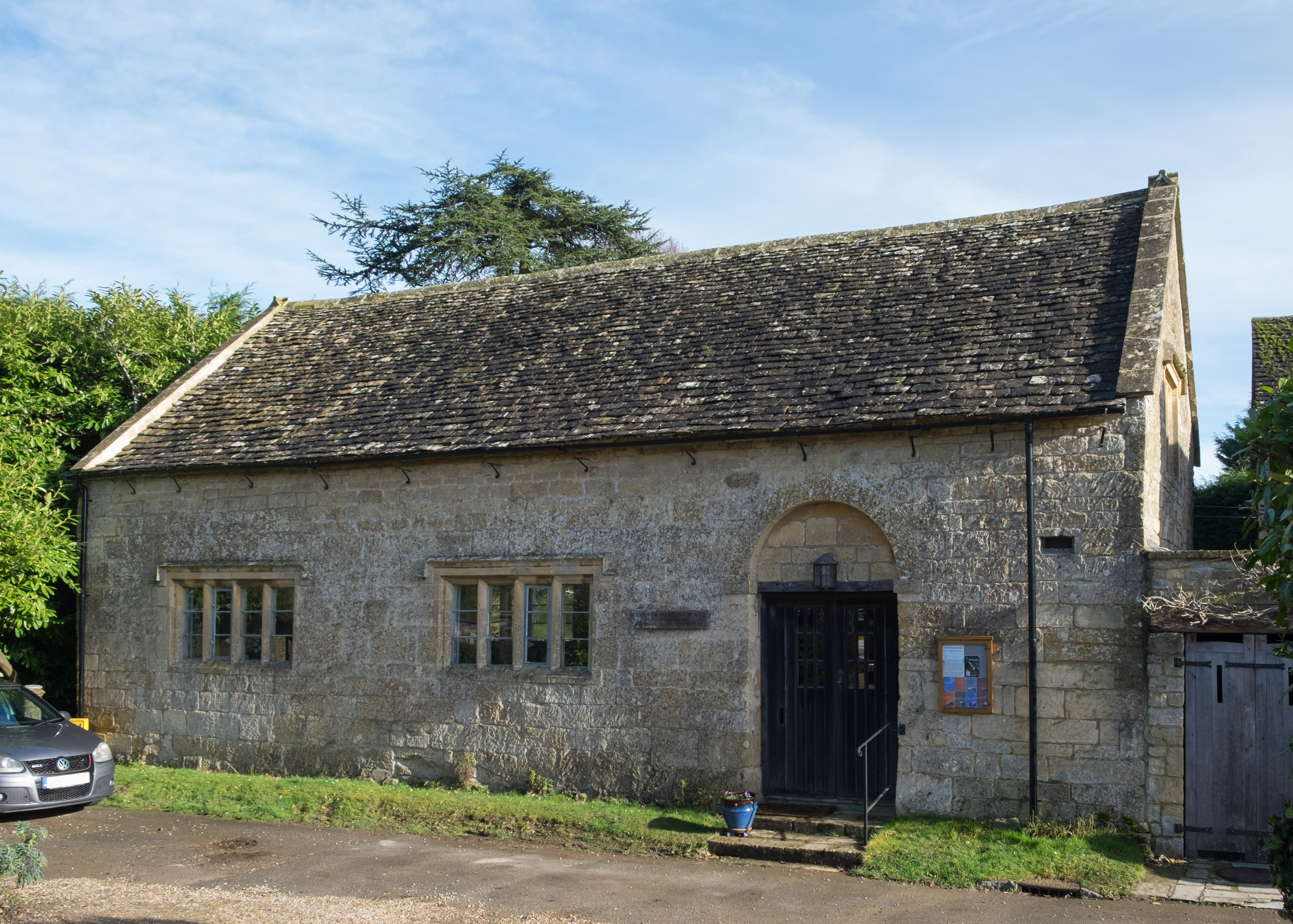
The Quaker Meeting House in Broad Campden featured as Kembleford Parish Hall

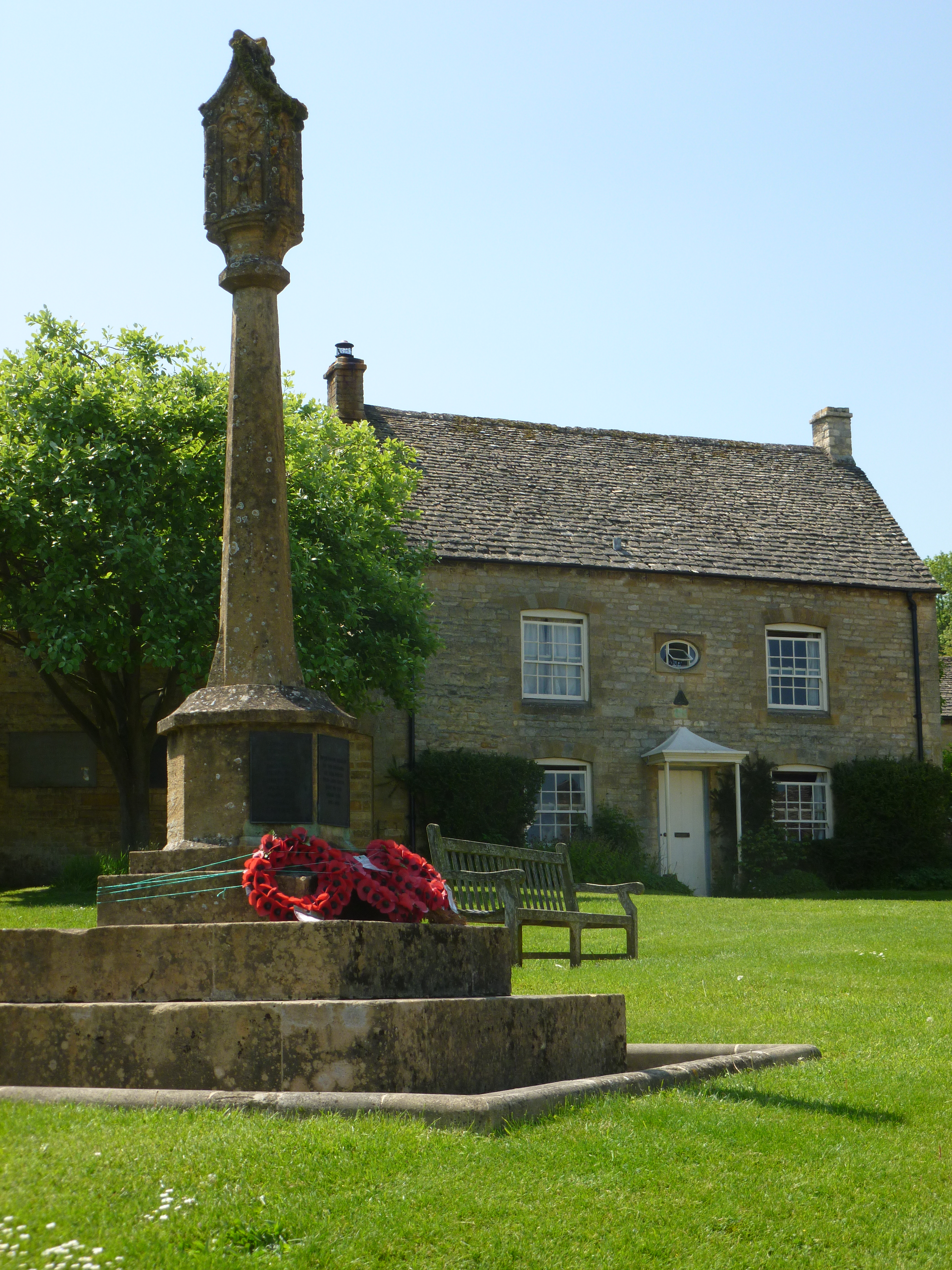
Guiting Power doubled as part of Kembleford

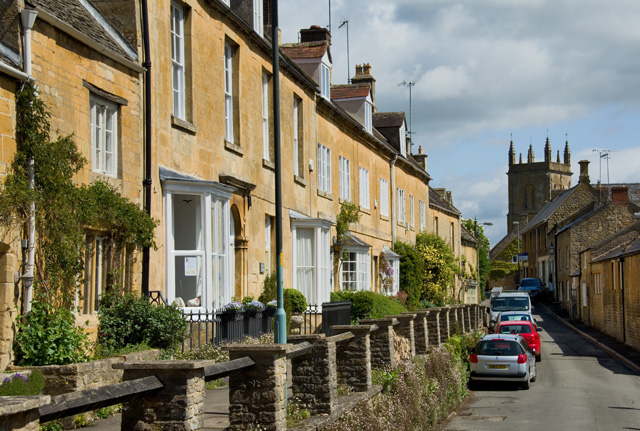
High Street, Blockley

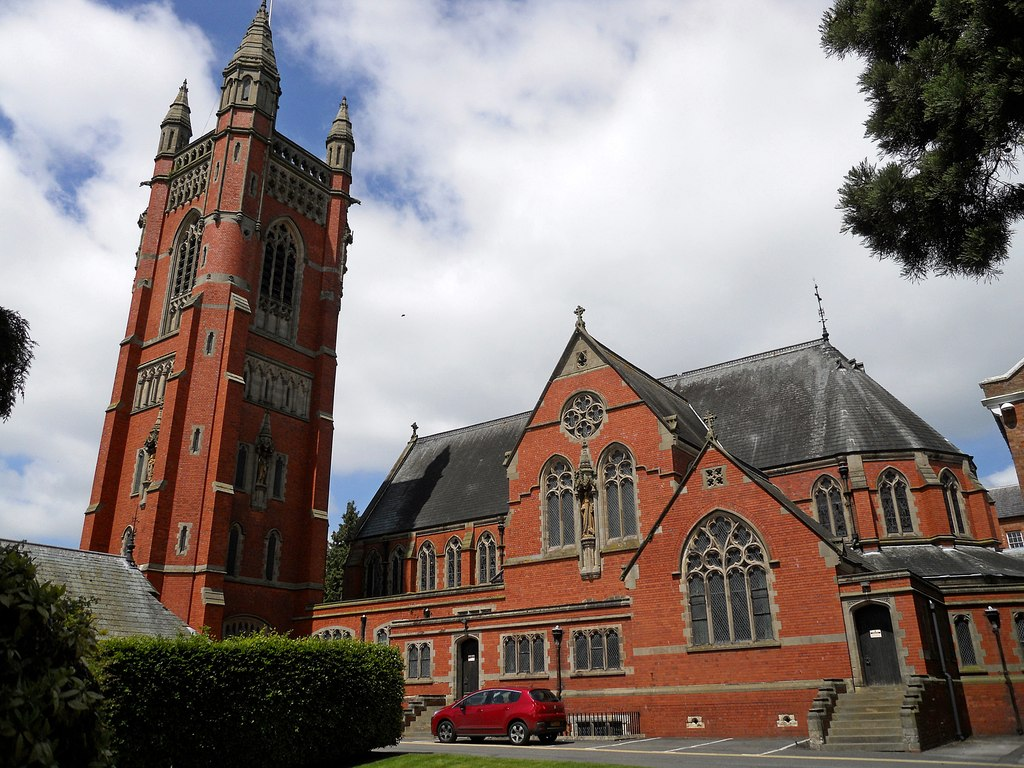
Princethorpe College

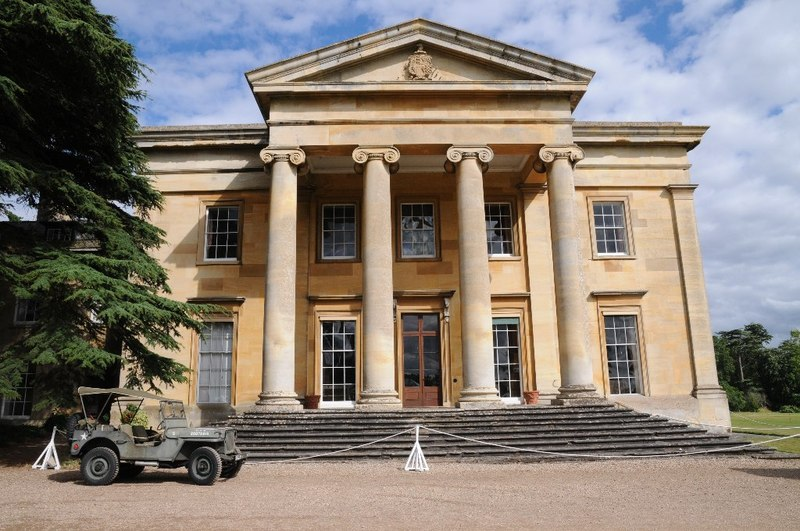
Spetchley Park was used for "The Curse of Amenhotep" (2015)

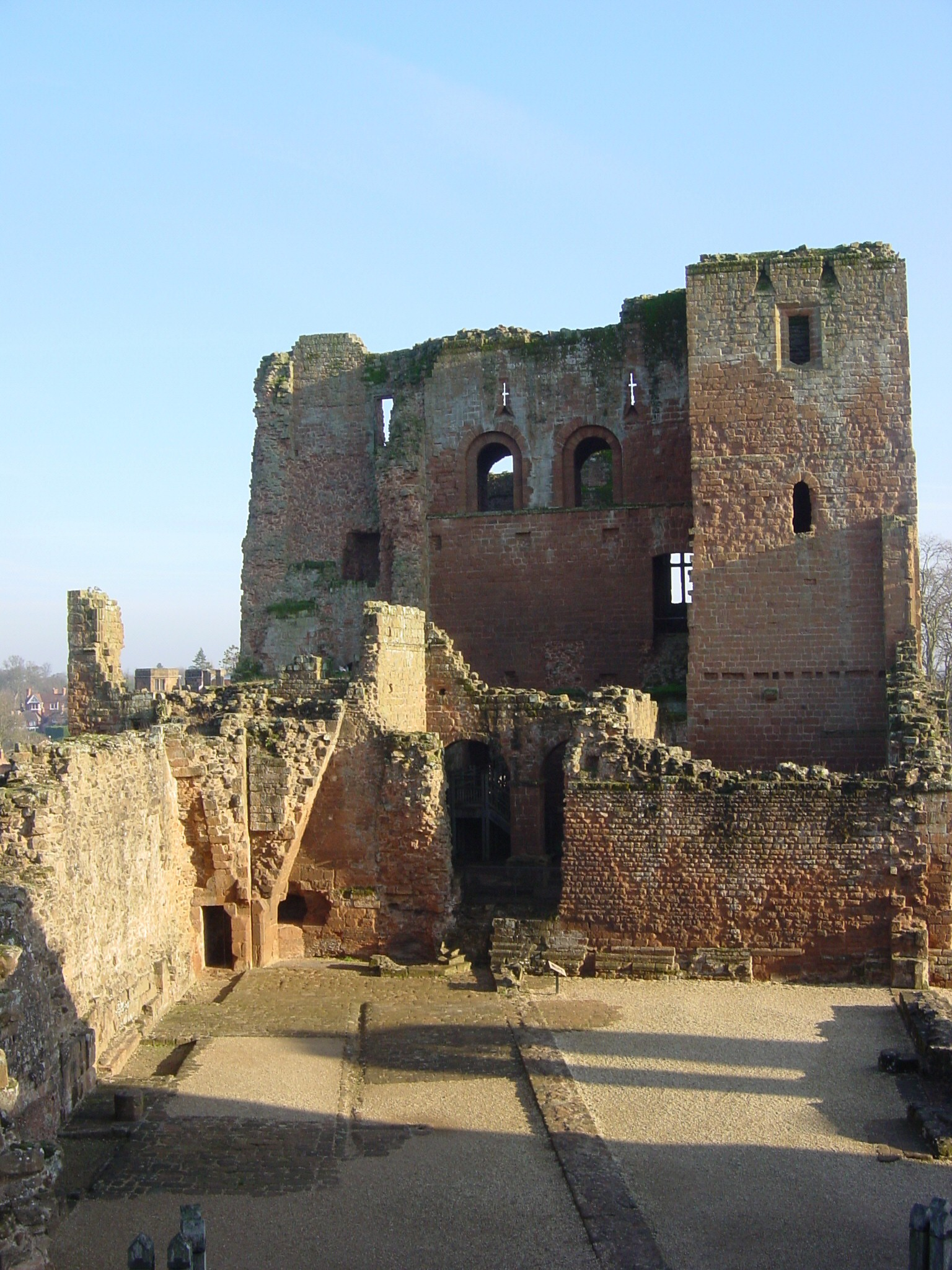
Kenilworth Castle

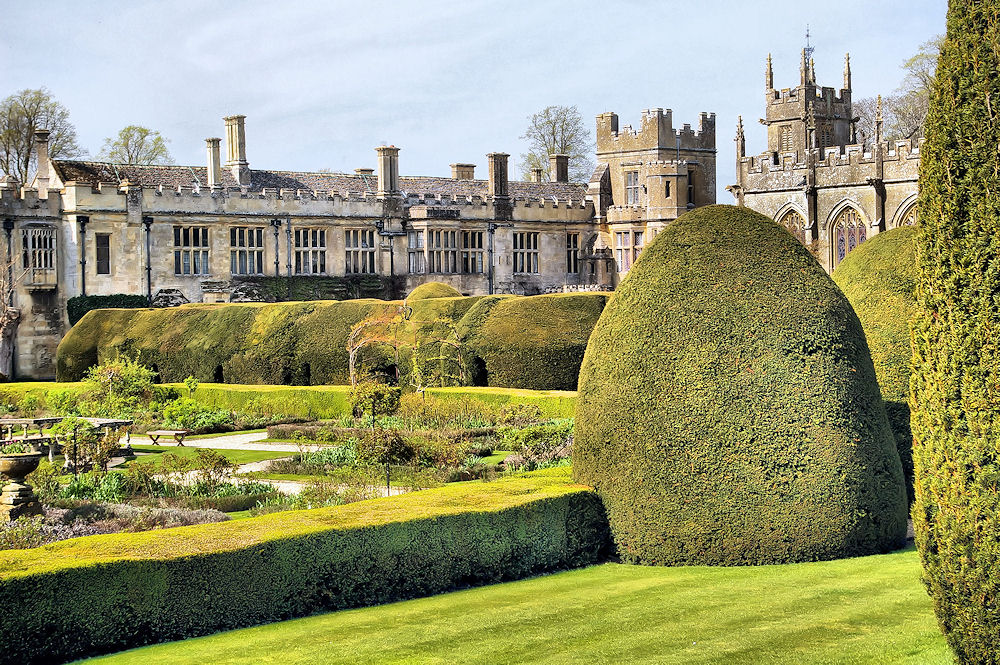
Sudeley Castle, Gloucestershire

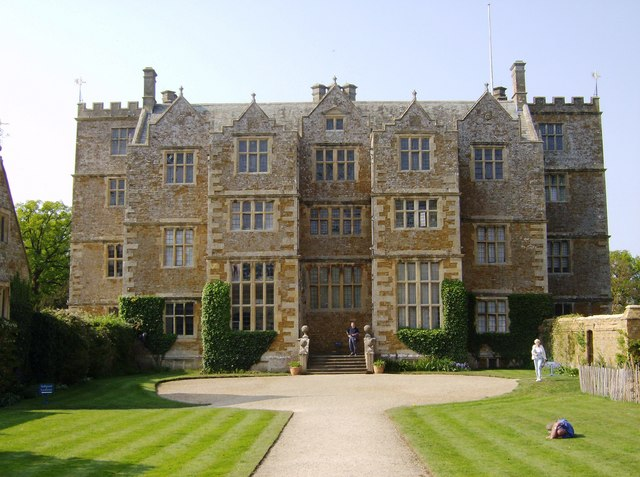
Chastleton House, Oxfordshire

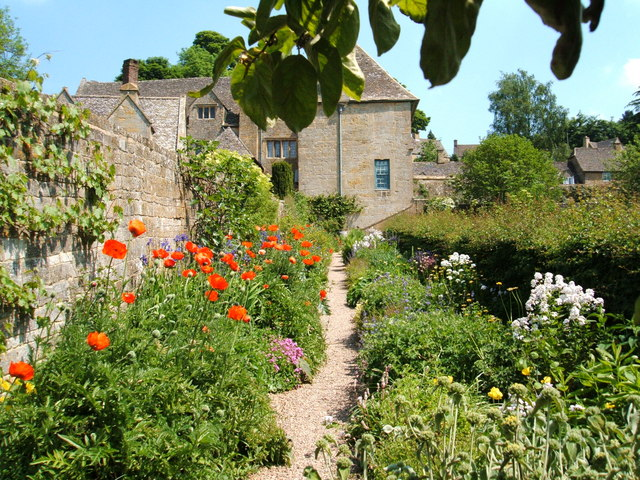
Snowshill Manor Garden

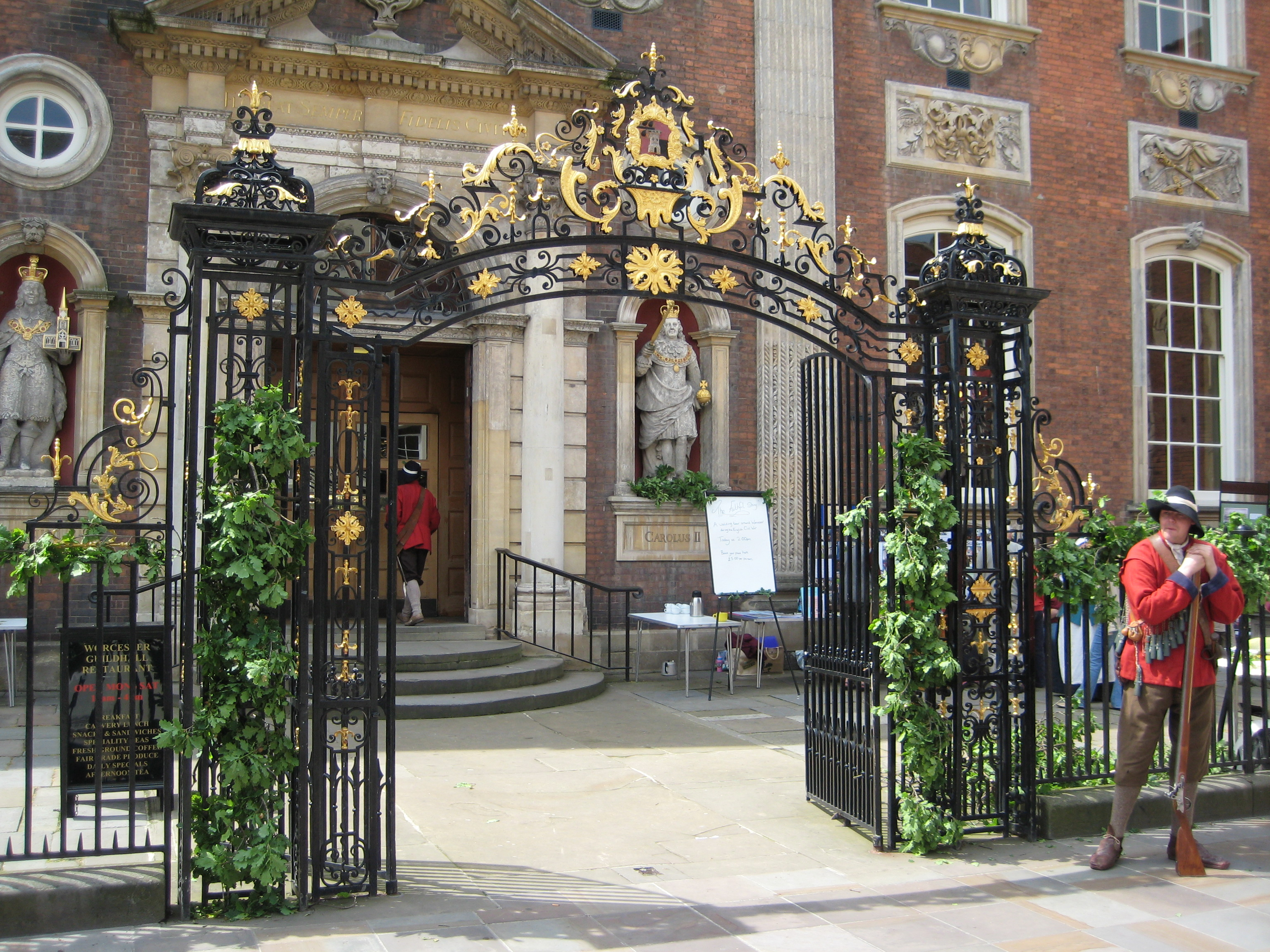
The Worcester Guildhall

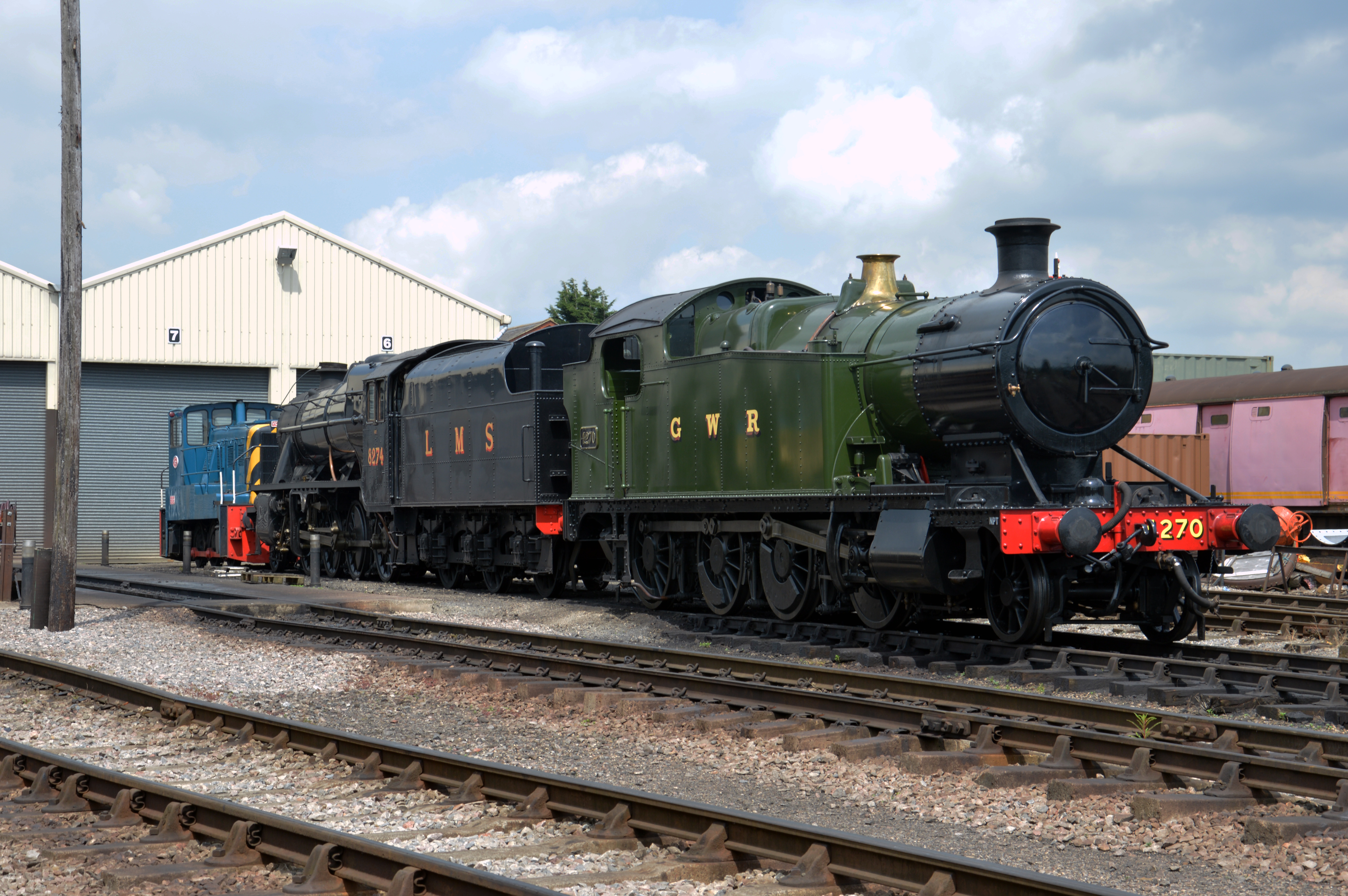
Gloucestershire & Warwickshire Heritage Railway

Alscot Park

== Episodes ==
Series	Episodes	Originally released	
Series	Episodes	First released	Last released
1	10	14 January 2013	25 January 2013
2	10	6 January 2014	17 January 2014
3	15	5 January 2015	23 January 2015
4	10	4 January 2016	15 January 2016
5	15	23 December 2016	19 January 2017
6	10	18 December 2017	12 January 2018
7	10	7 January 2019	18 January 2019
8	10	6 January 2020	17 January 2020
9	10	3 January 2022	14 January 2022
10	10	6 January 2023	10 March 2023
11	10	5 January 2024	8 March 2024
12	10	10 January 2025	14 March 2025
13	10	9 January 2026	27 March 2026

== Broadcast ==
BBC Worldwide has sold Father Brown to 232 territories, including, Australia (ABC and 7TWO), Belgium (VRT), the Netherlands (KRO-NCRV, BBC NL), Spain (Paramount Network, A3 Series), Portugal (FOX Crime), Finland (YLE), Sweden (TV8), Denmark (DR), Norway (NRK), Estonia (ETV), Iceland (RÚV), Poland (BBC First, TVP2), Italy (LA7), Croatia (HRT), and Brazil (TV Cultura). In the United States, Father Brown has been sold to 40 public television stations with a reach of 30% of all U.S. television households. The first four series were added to the Netflix streaming service on 31 March 2017. Series five and six were added later in 2019.

== Spin-off ==
In January 2020, it was announced that production had begun of a ten-episode series titled Sister Boniface Mysteries for BritBox, the streaming service. Lorna Watson returned as Sister Boniface. She played the character in 2013 in the Father Brown episode "The Bride of Christ" and in the 2024 Father Brown episode "The Forensic Nun". It was confirmed this series would air in early 2022, alongside the ninth series of the parent production. After debuting on BritBox, Sister Boniface Mysteries aired on Drama, with the DVD available from 16 May 2022. The spin-off was renewed for second, third, and fourth series.

Mark Williams guest-stars, reprising his role as Father Brown, in the 2022 Sister Boniface Mysteries episode "My Brother's Keeper".

== Home media ==
Father Brown is available on DVD in Region 1 in the United States and Canada via BBC Video. In the UK (Region 2), the series was released through Dazzler Media, and is available on both DVD and Blu-ray for all individual series sets. Several sets featuring multiple series were also made available in the UK. In Australia (Region 4), the series was originally released via Roadshow Entertainment for its first six series, before the distribution rights were acquired by Universal Pictures Home Entertainment for subsequent series. However, Universal also acquired rights to the first six series for re-release on DVD.

The series is also available on DVD in the Netherlands and Germany.

Series	Release date			
Series	Region 1	Region 2/B	Region 4	Region 4 (Re-issue)
Series 1	16 September 2014	7 April 2014 (DVD) 19 May 2014 (Blu-ray)	4 September 2013	11 December 2019
Series 2	5 May 2015	9 June 2014	27 August 2014	8 January 2020
Series 3	5 April 2016 (Part 1) 13 September 2016 (Part 2)	30 March 2015	19 August 2015	8 January 2020
Series 4	13 December 2016	21 March 2016	15 June 2016	8 January 2020
Series 5	12 December 2017	13 February 2017	20 September 2017	11 December 2019
Series 6	11 December 2018	12 February 2018	6 June 2018	20 November 2019
Series 7	10 December 2019	11 February 2019	13 November 2019	—N/a
Series 8	8 December 2020	10 February 2020	28 October 2020	—N/a
Series 9	13 September 2022	14 February 2022	31 August 2022	—N/a
Series 10	8 August 2023	13 March 2023	20 November 2024	—N/a
Series 11	21 May 2024	11 March 2024	5 February 2025	—N/a
Series 12	20 May 2025	17 March 2025	TBA	—N/a
Additional sets
Series 1–4	—N/a	21 March 2016	—N/a	—N/a
Special (2016)	—N/a	27 November 2017	—N/a	—N/a
Series 1–6	—N/a	12 February 2018	—N/a	—N/a
Series 5–8	—N/a	10 February 2020	—N/a	—N/a
Series 1–8	—N/a	10 February 2020	—N/a	—N/a
Series 1–10	—N/a	2 October 2023	—N/a	—N/a

Key
= Indicates availability only on DVD
= Indicates availability on both DVD & Blu-ray

=== Streaming ===
Since 2019, the series has been prominently featured on the Britbox streaming service in North America.
