= Thomas Wilson (dean of Worcester) =

Thomas Wilson (d 20 July 1586) was Dean of Worcester from 1559 until his death.

Wilson was born in Kendal, educated at St John's College, Cambridge and ordained. He was appointed to a living as Vicar of Church of St Peter and St Paul, Blockley. During his time as Dean of Worcester an inventory of plate and furniture was drawn up listing the cathedral's ornaments. Wilson found favour with the Elizabethan court, when Sir William Cecil fell ill, and retreated to Burghley. On 12 November 1571 Thomas Wilson attended Privy Council and was appointed principal Secretary alongside Sir Francis Walsingham. In 1578 he was one of the deputies sent to the Diet of Schmalkalden.

In May 1581 he was replaced by secretary Walsingham as the Queen's principal secretary, combining the two posts. He died in 1586.

Thomas Wilson married Dorothy Banister, and their only daughter, who survived him, died in 1641.

Church of England titles
Preceded by John Pedder	Dean of Worcester; 1571–1586	Succeeded by Francis Willis
