= Upper Ditchford =

Abandoned village in Gloucestershire, England

Coordinates: 52°1′47″N 1°42′37″W

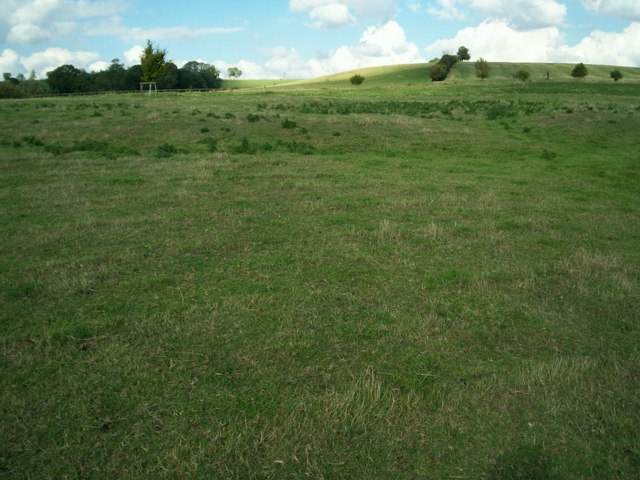
Site of the Medieval village of Upper Ditchford

Upper Ditchford is an abandoned village to the west of the Fosse Way between Moreton-in-Marsh and Stretton on Fosse, now in the county of Gloucestershire in England but formerly located in Warwickshire. It has been scheduled as an ancient monument.

It is located approximately a mile north of the hamlet of Aston Magna and 1½ miles to the east of Paxford on the 100m contour line.

According to Historic England "Documentary evidence indicates that the village became ruinous at the end of the 15th century". Another nearby was Lower Ditchford, while Ditchford Frary is largely deserted.
