= Loopy (film) =

Twisted
- Release date: 2004
- Running time: 20 mins
- Country: United States
- Language: English
- Budget: $35,000 (estimated)

Loopy is a 2004 film written and directed by Seth Michael Donsky. It is an adaptation of a short story by Ruth Rendell. Loopy screened at the Palm Springs International Festival of Short Films, the Cinequest Film Festival and the Clermont-Ferrand International Short Film Festival. Loopy currently airs in rotation on the Independent Film Channel. The tagline for the film is "A sheep in wolf's clothing!"

== Cast ==
- Michael Countryman – Colin Highsmith
- Elizabeth Franz – Mrs. Highsmith
- Henny Russell – Myra
