= John Burton (actor) =

British actor (born 1967)

- Born: 14 May 1967 (age 57); United Kingdom
- Occupation: Actor
- Height: 6 ft 1 in (185 cm)
- Website: http://www.johnburton.tv

John Burton (born 14 May 1967) is an English stage and television actor, best known for his long-running role as Sergeant Daniel Goodfellow in BBC television's Father Brown.

== Selected filmography ==
- Emmerdale (1997) (soap opera)
- Coronation Street (1997) (soap opera)
- Undercover Customs (1998) (TV series)
- Where the Heart Is (1998) (TV series)
- Noah's Ark (1998) (TV series)
- Hollyoaks (1998) (soap opera)
- Cold Feet (1998) (Series 1, Episode 1) (TV series)
- Dalziel and Pascoe (1999) (TV series)
- Clocking Off (1999) (TV series)
- Always and Everyone (1999) (TV series)
- The Bill (2000) (TV series)
- Merseybeat (2001) (TV series)
- Crossroads (2001) (soap opera)
- Brookside (2002) (soap opera)
- EastEnders (2003) (soap opera)
- Casualty (2003) (TV series)
- Crisis Command (2004) (TV series)
- All in the Game (2005) (TV film)
- Afterlife (2006) (TV series)
- Father Brown (2014–present) (TV series)
