= Church of St Peter and St Paul, Blockley =

Church of St Peter and St Paul
- The Parish Church of Saint Peter and Saint Paul
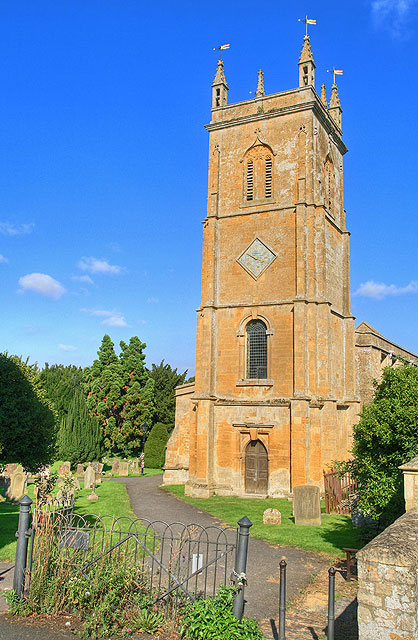
- Church of St Peter and St Paul
- 52.012468°N 1.761557°W
- Location: The Square, Blockley, Gloucestershire, GL56 9ES
- Country: England
- Denomination: Church of England
- Previous denomination: Roman Catholic Church
- Churchmanship: Broad Church
- Website: Church website

History
- Status: Active
- Dedication: Saint Peter; Saint Paul

Architecture
- Functional status: Parish church
- Heritage designation: Grade II* listed
- Style: Norman
- Years built: 1180

Administration
- Diocese: Gloucester
- Archdeaconry: Cheltenham
- Deanery: North Cotswold
- Parish: Blockley with Aston Magna

Clergy
- Bishop: Rachel Treweek
- Vicar: The Revd Canon Dana Delap

The Church of St Peter and St Paul is a Church of England parish church in Blockley, Gloucestershire, England. The church is a Grade II* listed building. In addition to being an active Anglican parish church, it appears in the television series Father Brown as the village's Roman Catholic church.

== History ==
The Church of England parish church of St. Peter and St. Paul is late Norman, built in about 1180. The chancel is of three bays but only one of the six Norman lancet windows, that at the east end of the north wall, survives unaltered. At the end of the 13th century a two-storey extension was added on the north side of the chancel. The upper floor is a chantry chapel and the lower is a vestry. In about 1310 the east window of the chancel was inserted and at least two of the windows in the south wall of the chancel were enlarged in the Decorated Gothic style. At the end of the 14th century the north aisle was added, linked with the nave by an arcade of four bays. The large Perpendicular Gothic window in the middle of the south wall of the chancel was inserted in the 15th century, replacing the Norman original.

The south porch was added in 1630, the clerestorey was added to the nave in 1636 and the north arcade was probably rebuilt in the same century. The bell tower was built in 1725, probably replacing an earlier one. The west gallery was inserted in 1735. The church was restored and the north porch added in 1871. By 1854 the tower had a ring of six bells, of which the two oldest were cast in 1638 and the remainder in 1679, 1683, 1729 and 1854. The bells were increased to a ring of eight, and in 2016 an appeal was launched to replace the bell frame and to increase the number of bells to ten.

== Present day ==
The ecclesiastical parish now forms part of the Vale and Cotswold Edge team of Church of England churches, with the Team Vicar remaining responsible for Blockley and its outlying villages of Paxford, Draycott and Aston Magna, as well as the parish of Bourton-on-the-Hill.

Dalziel and Pascoe episode Sins of the Fathers was filmed in the church.

The church is used as St Mary's Roman Catholic church in the Father Brown television series and the vicarage transformed into presbytery for Father Brown's residence.

In 2017 the bell frame was replaced by John Taylor of Loughborough. At the same time all the bells were removed and cleaned. The tenor bell was recast, two new trebles added, and all the headstocks and other equipment replaced.

== Notable people ==
- Erasmus Saunders, (1670–1724) a Welsh priest and writer, curate and then vicar at the beginning of the 18th century
- Thomas Wilson, vicar, later Dean of Worcester (1571–1586)
- Thomas Henry Morgan (1898-1957) buried in churchyard, alleged original Welsh composer of Welsh standard "We'll Keep a Welcome"

== Gallery ==
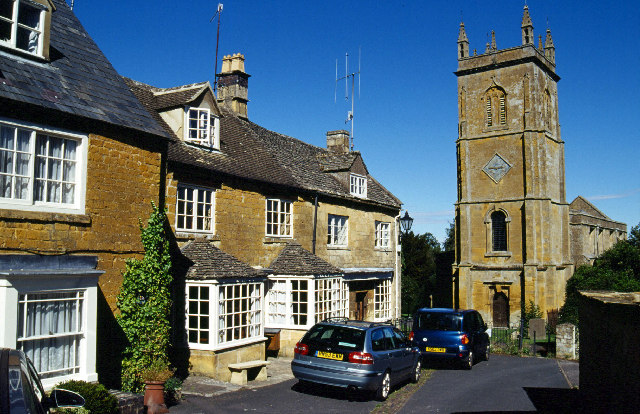
The church within the village

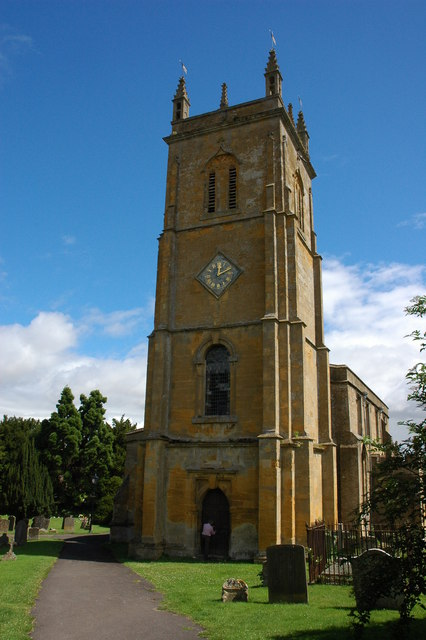
Church tower

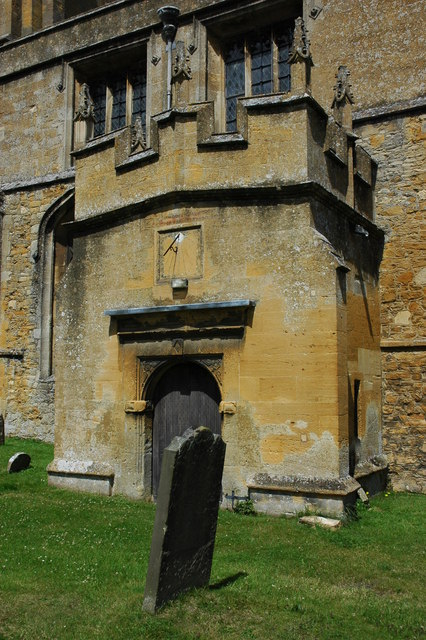
South porch

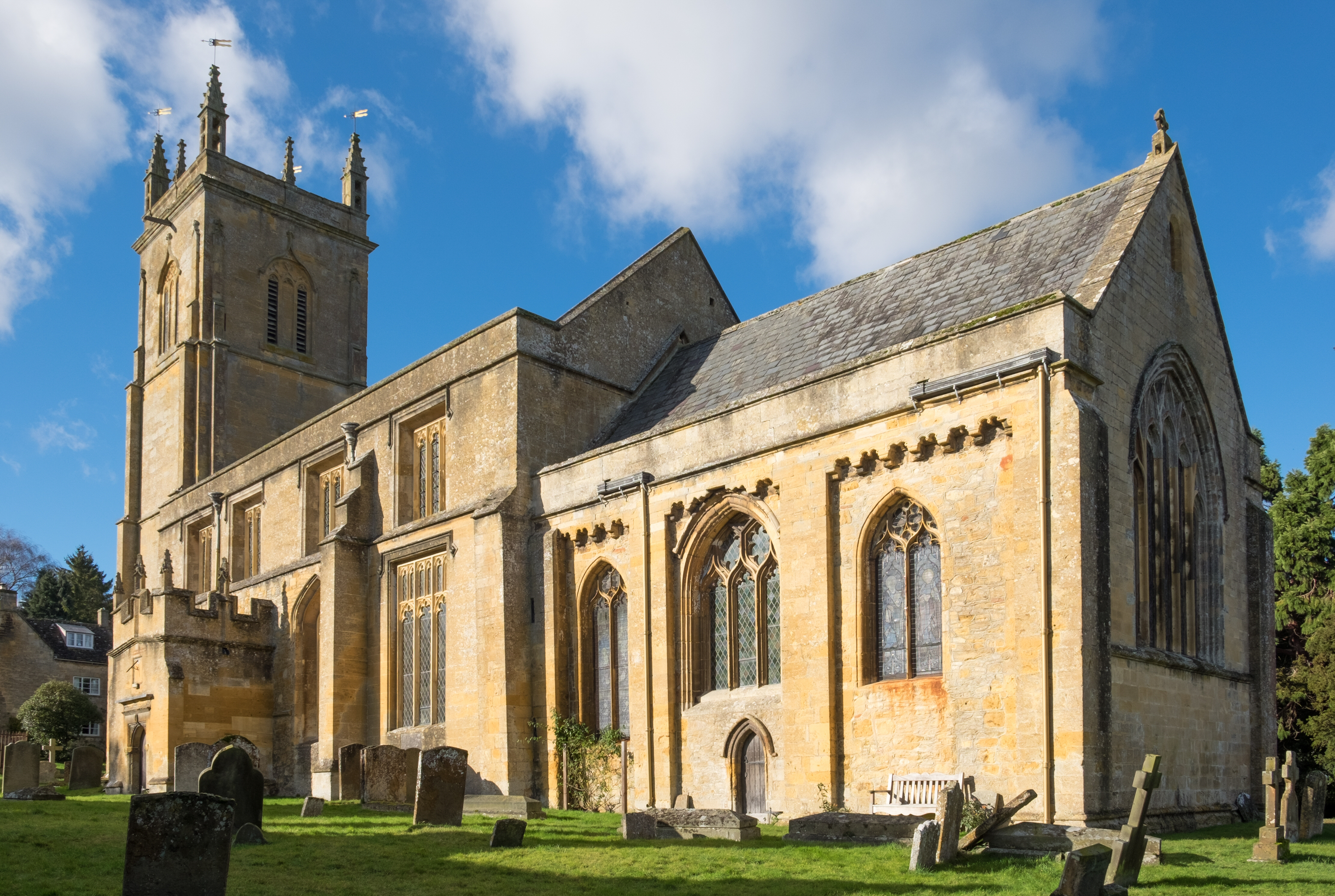
South-east view

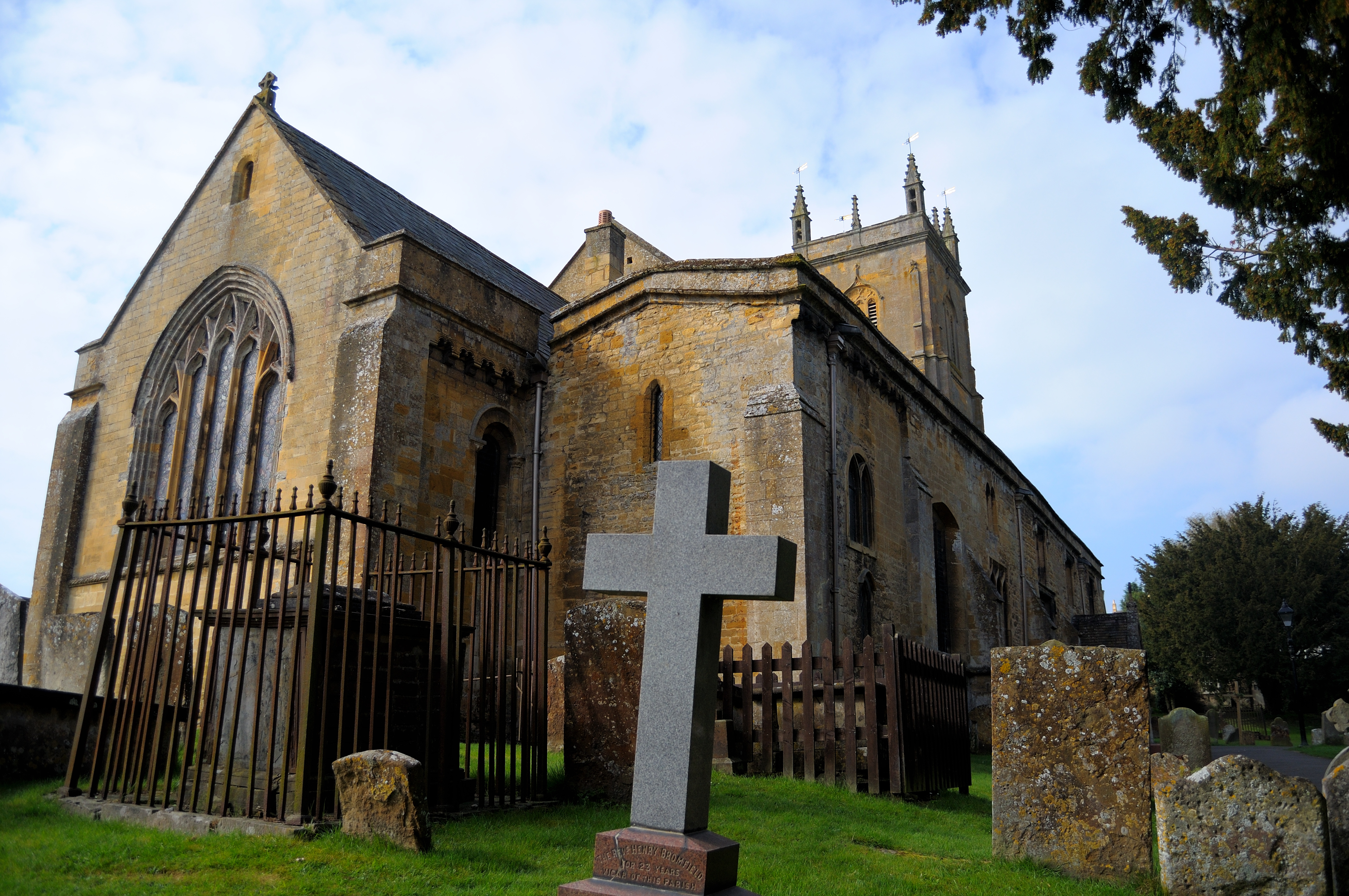
