= Erasmus Saunders (priest, died 1724) =

Erasmus Saunders (1670 – 1 June 1724) was a Welsh priest and writer.

Saunders was born in Clydey, Pembrokeshire. He was educated at Jesus College, Oxford, matriculating on 20 March 1690 and gaining various degrees thereafter: BA 1693, MA 1696, BD 1705, and DD 1712. Whilst still a student, he assisted Edward Lhuyd in collecting archaeological information about Pembrokeshire and Carmarthenshire.

He was associated with Bishop William Lloyd, one of the Seven Bishops who had protested against the Declaration of Indulgence issued by James II in 1688. Lloyd's son (also called William Lloyd) was vicar of Church of St Peter and St Paul, Blockley in Bishop Lloyd's Diocese of Worcester and Saunders became curate there in 1702, succeeding Lloyd's son as vicar in 1705. He also became rector of Helmdon, Northamptonshire in 1706, holding this post to 1721 in absentia. In 1709, Bishop George Bull made him a Prebendary of the collegiate church in Brecon.

Saunders was regarded as an active parish priest in Blockley. He helped institute a school in 1713, with the aid of local gentry, choosing a Welsh inscription: Aros a Llwydda ("Stay and Prosper"). He supported the work of the Society for the Propagation of Christian Knowledge and bought fifty copies of their edition of the Welsh Bible to assist with publication. He published sermons and, in 1721, A View of the State of Religion in the Diocese of S. Davids, a book dealing with what he called "the melancholy state" of the diocese.

Saunders married in 1714 and had seven children. He died of apoplexy at Aberbechan in 1724, and was buried in St Mary's Church, Shrewsbury, where he is commemorated with a tomb. His eldest son also raised a memorial tablet in the church at Blockley, showing his coat of arms.
