= Blockley =

Village in Gloucestershire, England

Coordinates: 52.0127°N 1.7624°W

- Location within Gloucestershire
- Population: 2,041 (2011 Census)
- OS grid reference: SP1634
- District: Cotswold
- Shire county: Gloucestershire
- Region: South West
- Country: England
- Sovereign state: United Kingdom
- Post town: Moreton-in-Marsh
- Postcode district: GL56
- Dialling code: 01386
- Police: Gloucestershire
- Fire: Gloucestershire
- Ambulance: South Western
- UK Parliament: North Cotswolds
- Website: Blockley Parish Council

Blockley is a village, civil parish and ecclesiastical parish in the Cotswold district of Gloucestershire, England, about 3 miles (5 km) northwest of Moreton-in-Marsh. Until 1931 Blockley was an exclave of Worcestershire.

The civil and ecclesiastical parish boundaries are roughly coterminous, and include the hamlets of Draycott, Paxford and Aston Magna, the residential development at Northwick and the deserted hamlets of Upton and Upper Ditchford.

Blockley village is on Blockley Brook, a tributary of Knee Brook. Knee Brook forms the northeastern boundary of the parish and is a tributary of the River Stour.

== History ==
=== Manor ===
In AD 855 King Burgred of Mercia granted a monastery at Blockley to Ealhhun, Bishop of Worcester for the price of 300 solidi. In 1086 the Domesday Book recorded that the Bishop of Worcester held an estate of 38 hides at Blockley. The Bishops of Worcester retained the estate until 1648, during the English Civil War, when the Parliamentary Trustees sold it. After the restoration of the English monarchy the estate was restored to the Bishop of Worcester, whose successors held the manor until at least 1781.

=== Churches ===
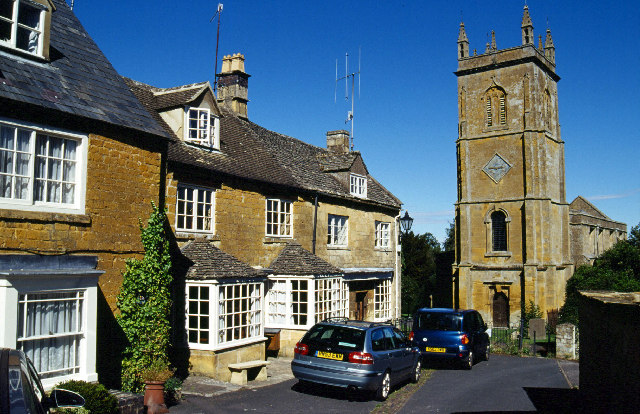
Blockley village including Saints' Peter and Paul Church

The Church of England parish church of St. Peter and St. Paul is late Norman, built in about 1180. The ecclesiastical parish now forms part of the Vale and Cotswold Edge team of Church of England churches, with the Team Vicar remaining responsible for Blockley and its outlying villages of Paxford, Draycott and Aston Magna, as well as the parish of Bourton-on-the-Hill.

The church is used as St Mary's Roman Catholic church in the Father Brown television series and the vicarage as the presbytery, Father Brown's residence.

The Baptist Chapel was built in 1835.

=== Economic and social history ===
In 1715 the Vicar, the Rev. Dr. Erasmus Saunders, had a new school built for the parish. Blockley still has a Church of England primary school.

Much of the parish was farmed under an open field system until 1772, when an Act of Parliament provided for the enclosure of the remaining common lands.

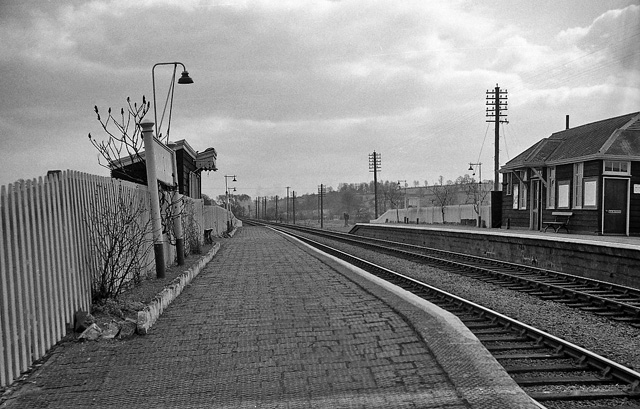
Blockley railway station in 1962

The Oxford, Worcester and Wolverhampton Railway, built between 1845 and 1851, passes through the parish. Blockley railway station was more than 1.5 miles (2.4 km) northeast of the village and nearer to Paxford. British Railways closed Blockley railway station in 1966 but the railway remains open as part of the Cotswold Line. The nearest railway station still open is Moreton-in-Marsh.

Blockley is home to Watsonian Squire, the largest UK manufacturer of sidecars and trailers for motorbikes. It has been based in the village since 1984.

== Governance ==
An electoral ward in the same name exists. This ward has the same area and population as the civil parish.

== Amenities ==
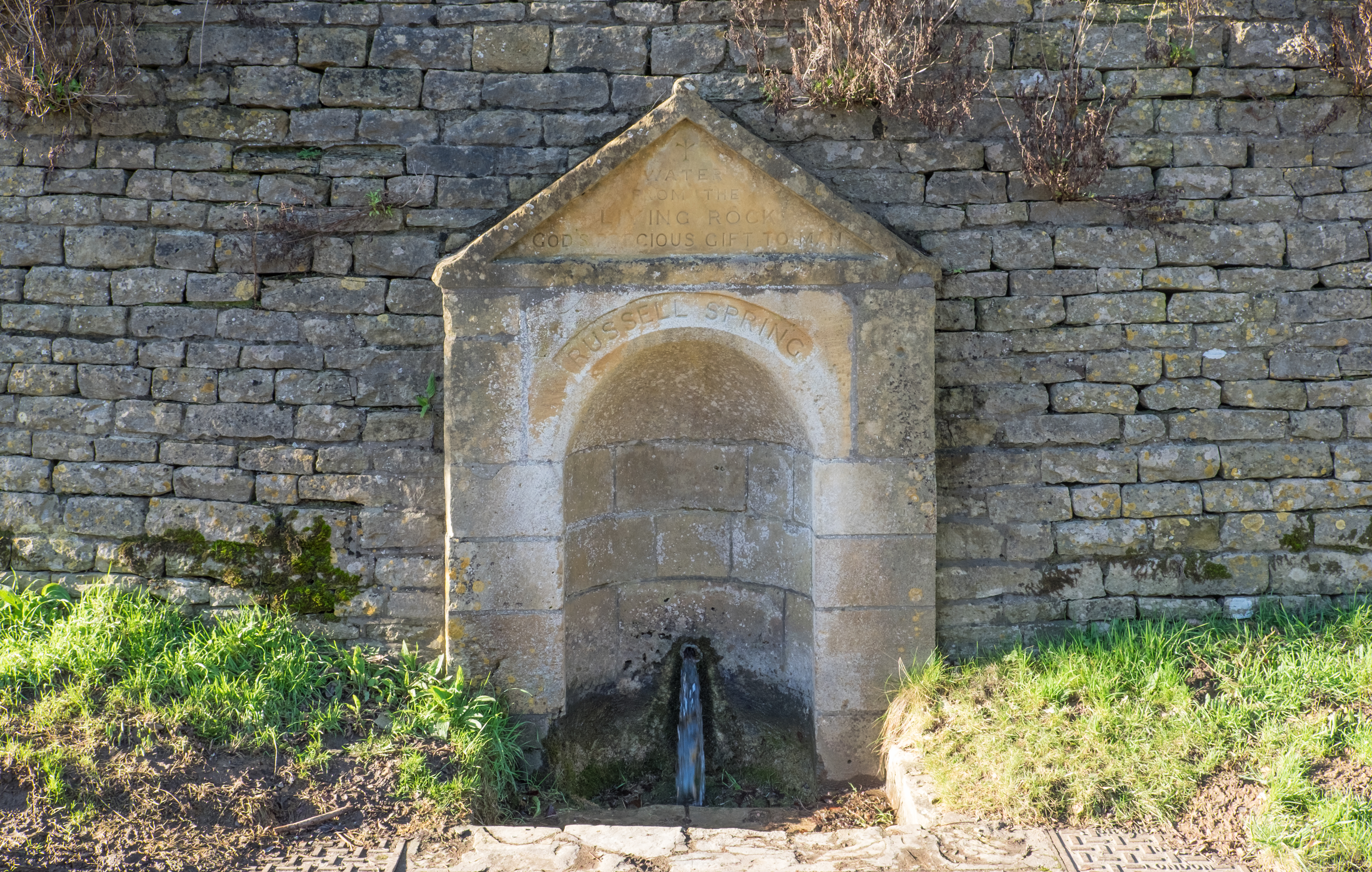
Russell Spring, a 19th-century roadside spring in the village

Blockley has two public houses. The Crown Inn and Hotel is a former coaching inn. The Great Western Arms belongs to the Hook Norton Brewery.

Blockley Sports & Social Club is the local sports club which has Hockey, Cricket and Football sections. The post office closed in 2007. In May 2008, under a co-operative agreement, the village residents opened a new local not for profit store that is a grocer, newsagent, post office, off-licence and café.

== Sources ==
- Verey, David (1970). The Buildings of England: Gloucestershire: The Cotswolds. Harmondsworth: Penguin Books. pp. 121–125. ISBN 0-14-071040-X.
- Victoria County History: A History of the County of Worcester, Volume 3. 1913. pp. 265–276.
