= Seth Michael Donsky =

American film director

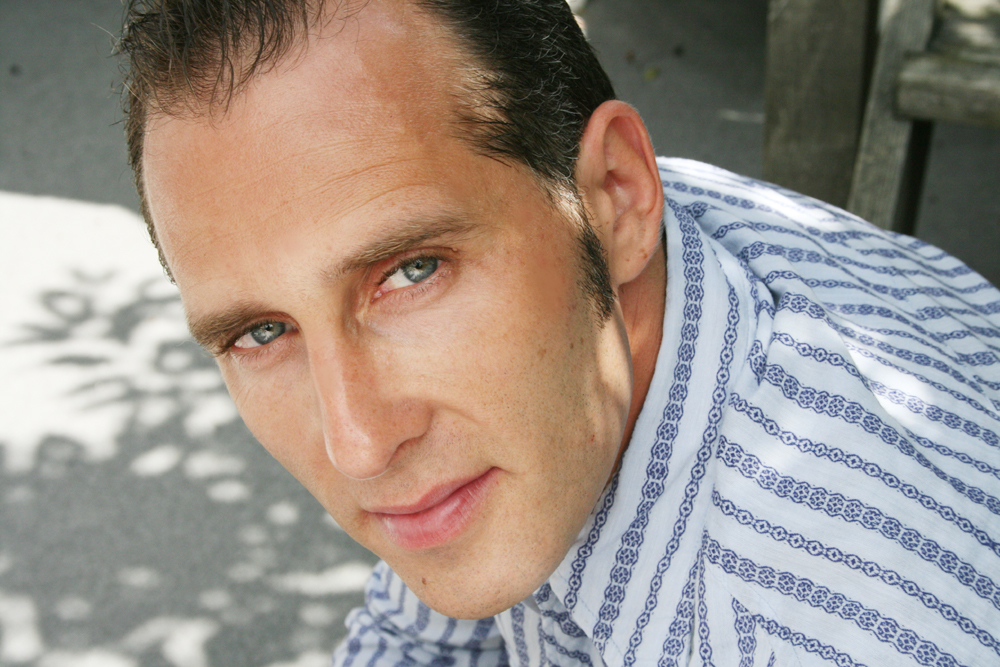
- Born: Champaign, Illinois
- Occupation(s): Filmmaker, producer, screenwriter
- Spouse: Patrick Corbin
- Children: 1

Seth Michael Donsky is an American filmmaker, producer/screenwriter and former journalist.

== Biography ==
Seth Michael Donsky is one of the International Screenwriters' Association's top 25 writers to watch in 2024. He is a 2023 recipient of the ISA's Diversity Initiative award and on the ISA's distinguished development slate.

His feature screenplay Stardusk, about the life of transgender Andy Warhol Superstar Candy Darling is in pre-production with the Oscar-award winning producer Bruce Cohen. He is also adapting Kate Bornstein's A Queer and Pleasant Danger (Beacon Press) and Lauren Roedy Vaughn's OCD, The Dude and Me (Penguin Group) (Dial Press) for the screen. A Queer and Pleasant Danger advanced in consideration for the Nicholl Fellowships in Screenwriting and The Sundance Lab.

His feature screenplay Grit N' Glitter, the story of Allan Carr producing La Cage aux Folles (musical) on Broadway during the HIV/AIDS in the United States was one of five finalists for the Enderby Entertainment Award in the 2018 Austin Film Festival for screenplays with a unique voice and distinct vision. The finalists were selected by Rick Dugdale, Donald Petrie and Daniel Petrie, Jr. of Enderby Entertainment. It also placed in the Nicholl Fellowships in Screenwriting.

He holds an MFA in Film from Columbia University School of the Arts where he twice received the Dean's Fellowship, Columbia School of the Arts highest merit-based recognition. He wrote and directed the short film Loopy as his thesis film for graduation from Columbia. His feature film debut Twisted (1996 film), which he wrote and directed, was produced towards the tail end of the New Queer Cinema.

Loopy (film) was adapted from a short-story by Edgar Award winning, British crime writer Ruth Rendell and featured a performance by Tony Award winning Elizabeth Franz. It was produced by Benjamin Odell (producer), a fellow student at Columbia University School of the Arts at the time. Loopy premiered at the Clermont-Ferrand International Short Film Festival, played at the Palm Springs International ShortFest and the Cinequest Film Festival among others, took 1st Runner Up at the HBO Short Film Competition at the Savannah College of Art and Design film festival and was broadcast in rotation on the IFC (American TV channel).

Twisted premiered at the 47th Berlin International Film Festival, won the audience award at the GLBTQ Film Festival of Turin, was included in the Museum of Modern Art's Charles Dickens bicentenary film series and subsequently accepted into the Museum of Modern Art Department of Film's permanent film collection. Twisted was the feature film debut of Tony and Emmy winning Billy Porter (entertainer) and the penultimate screen performance of Oscar and Emmy-nominated William Hickey (actor). It also featured performances from Tony-award winning Anthony Crivello and Elizabeth Franz.

Twisted's theatrical run was met with great praise from critics such as Kevin Thomas (film critic) in "The Los Angeles Times" , Bob Satuloff in Film Journal International , Elliott Stein and Dennis Lim in The Village Voice, and Armond White in New York Press.

While attending Columbia University School of the Arts Seth was selected to direct two commercial spots, Love Thy Neighbor and History of the Movies, as one of ten national finalists for the Coca-Cola Refreshing Filmmaker's Award Contest.

He has taught screenwriting at the New York Film Academy where he was chairman of the screenwriting department from 2004-2006, The Art Institute of New York City and in the MFA Screenwriting Program at Hollins University.

As a journalist he contributed regularly to Gotham Magazine and Los Angeles Confidential magazines. He also contributed articles to womansday.com, the online version of Elle Decor and at pointclickhome.com, the online site for Metropolitan Home and to the Edge, an online LGBT portal.

His 2009 New York Press cover feature The Trouble With Safe Sex, was reprinted in Cleis Press after choosing it in its special series "Best Sex Writing of 2010".

His 2010 New York Press cover feature Free at Las$t about debtors anonymous in New York City was recognized for excellence in coverage of business and financial news by the New York Press Association and prominently featured in the March/April 2011 Issue of Utne Reader.

He currently lives in Los Angeles with his husband, dancer/choreographer Patrick Corbin (dancer), a professor at USC's distinguished Glorya Kaufman School of Dance, their son, three cats, and their French Bulldog Minnie.

== Articles ==
(Selective, with media in parentheses)

- 2008: "Sensual Feng Shui" (Point Click Home)
- 2008: "Location, (Re)location: Barbara Tober Profile (Gotham Magazine)
- 2009: "Hollywood's Classic Interiors" (Point Click Home)
- 2009: "The Trouble With Safe Sex" (Cover story in New York Press)
- 2009: "What's Love Got To Do With It" (Cover story in New York Press)
- 2010: "Free at La$t" (Cover story in New York Press)
- 2011: "Domestic Bliss" (Cover story in New York Press)

== Discography ==
- A Christmas Carol - with Calgary Men's Chorus

== Filmography ==
- 1996: Twisted (director, producer, screenplay)
- 2003: Raw (short) (writer)
- 2004: Loopy (short) (director, screenplay)
- 2023 Stardusk
- 2023 A Queer and Pleasant Danger
- 2023 OCD, The Dude and Me
