= John Pedder (priest) =

English churchman

John Pedder (c.1520 – 1571) was an English churchman. A Marian exile, he was Dean of Worcester from 1559 until his death.

Pedder was educated at Peterhouse, Cambridge and was later elected a Fellow of Trinity College, Cambridge. He was Rector of Redgrave from 1551 to 1561; and then Vicar of Snitterfield, Warwickshire from 1563; and also Rector of Withington from 1568. He was appointed a Prebendary of Norwich in 1557; and of Hereford in 1563.

Church of England titles
Preceded by Seth Holland	Dean of Worcester; 1559–1571	Succeeded by Thomas Wilson
