= Patrick Corbin (dancer) =

American dancer

Patrick Corbin (born Potomac, Maryland), is an American dancer and founder of CorbinDances.

== Training ==
He began dance training at a young age in Potomac, Maryland and also studied at the Washington School of Ballet (being an apprentice with the Washington Ballet where he danced in works by Choo San Goh). He also studied with the School of American Ballet (1983).

== Work ==
He danced with the American Ballet Theatre II (1984). He then joined the Joffrey Ballet (1985–1989), where he was introduced to the choreography of Jiri Kylian, William Forsythe, Mark Morris, Frederick Ashton, Laura Dean, Leonide Massine, Vaslav Nijinsky, Pilobolus, and Paul Taylor. He was with the Paul Taylor Dance Company 1989–2005, becoming one of its most celebrated artists. He was the original "Johnny" in Paul Taylor's Company B.

Corbin is featured in five PBS Great Performances between 1988 and 2004 and in the 1998 Academy Award-nominated documentary Dancemaker. In 2001, Corbin was the recipient of the NY Performance Award (Bessie) for Sustained Achievement with The Paul Taylor Dance Company.

He has since danced with Lar Lubovitch Dance Company in “Men’s Stories” and he was one of the 43 dancers featured in David Michaelek’s film installation, "Slow Dancing" shown at the Lincoln Center Festival and the Music Center of Los Angeles.

Corbin founded CorbinDances in September 2005, with its inaugural season in spring 2006, embracing modern, contemporary, and ballet disciplines. He has stated that he aims to collaborate broadly, reaching beyond dancers to include writers, directors, lighting designers, visual artists, and musicians.

Recent performances include La MaMa Moves (April 2007), Jacob's Pillow Inside/Out (July 2007) and the Fire Island Dance Festival (July 2007). The company stages Corbin's work and that of Paul Taylor.

Corbin, whose career has bridged the worlds of classical ballet, modern and contemporary dance, has been a guest faculty member at the Conservatoire National Supérieur de Musique et de Danse de Paris, University of California, Irvine, George Mason University, SUNY Purchase, University of Kansas, University of Texas, Austin and University of Michigan. He has taught professionally for American Ballet Theatre, Miami City Ballet and San Francisco Ballet. He currently serves as associate professor of Practice at the USC Glorya Kaufman School of Dance in Los Angeles, California.
