= Aston Magna =

Village in Gloucestershire, England

Coordinates: 52°1′10″N 1°42′50″W

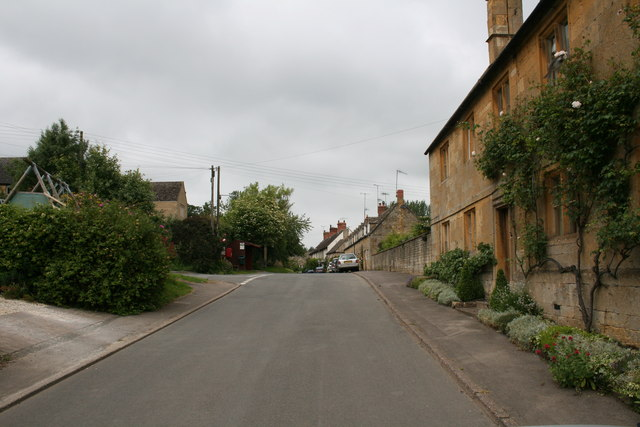

Aston Magna is a village located off Fosse Way in north Gloucestershire, England, between Moreton-in-Marsh and Shipston-on-Stour. It forms part of the civil parish of Blockley and the Church of England parish of Blockley with Aston Magna in the diocese of Gloucester. Aston Magna church itself is closed and now forms a private house.
