= Twisted (1996 film) =

1996 film by Seth Michael Donsky

- Directed by: Seth Michael Donsky
- Written by: Seth Michael Donsky
- Produced by: Adrian Agromonte (producer); Bernard Arbit, Barry Witz, Mark Weiner (executive producer)
- Cinematography: Hernan Toro
- Edited by: Tom McArdle
- Music by: Q. Lazzarus
- Distributed by: Leisure Time Features
- Release date: November 14, 1996 (Reeling Chicago)
- Running time: 100 minutes
- Country: United States
- Language: English
- Budget: $150,000 (estimated)

Twisted is a 1996 film written and directed by Seth Michael Donsky in his debut. The film, a Don Quixote and Miravista Films production, is a retelling of Charles Dickens' classic 1838 novel Oliver Twist, set in a New York City contemporary underground populated by drag queens, drug abusers and hustlers. The film was an official selection and debuted in 1997 at the 47th Berlin International Film Festival, and was also screened as an official selection at the Seattle International Film Festival. Donsky's film was made prior to Jacob Tierney's similar film Twist, starring American actor Nick Stahl.

Donsky's Twisted was re-discovered by the Museum of Modern Art in 2013, included in their Charles Dickens bicentenary film series and subsequently accepted into their permanent film collection.

== Synopsis ==
William Hickey stars as Andre, a lecherous brothel owner who trades in young men. Exploiting his young charges through paternalism and drugs, Andre sets his sights on Lee (Keivyn McNeil Graves), a ten-year-old, black, runaway orphan. Through Andre, Lee quickly becomes immersed in New York's sleazy underbelly of a drug dealer (Anthony Crivello stars as "Eddie") and street hustlers. The boy's only hope for survival is the aspiring songwriter Angel (David Norona), himself a former hustler. Angel befriends Lee and rescues him from the wiles of Andre's cohort Fine Art (Jean Loup Wolfman), who attempts to profit on Lee's young age. Eventually, Andre's petty empire is vanquished by Shiniqua (Billy Porter), a powerfully wise and glamorous drag queen whose fiercely maternal spirit is every bit the match for the depraved denizens of the brothel.

== Cast ==
- William Hickey as Andre, brothel owner
- Anthony Crivello as Eddie, drug dealer
- David Noroña as Angel, Eddie's boyfriend
- Keivyn McNeill Graves as Lee, black runaway orphan
- Billy Porter as Shiniqua, drag queen and Angel's friend
- Jean Loup Wolfman as Arthur 'Fine Art', a hustler
- Ray Aranha as Black Can Man
- Elizabeth Franz as Mrs. Bundrass, social Worker
- Simon Brook as Undercover Cop
- Erik Jensen as Punk
- Brenda Pressley as Mrs. Burns, Lee's foster mother
- Eugene Byrd as Willus, Mrs. Burns' son
- Keisha Howard as Laylene, Willus Burn's girlfriend
- Lynn Tanner as Celine Holland, a district attorney
- Kelly Coyle as Arthur's Girlfriend
- Rose Baum Senerchia as Andre's Mother
- Angelo Berkowitz as Brothel Boy
- Giovanni Giaconi as Taxi driver
- Ross Haines as Arresting Officer

== Awards and recognition ==
Twisted was an official selection at the 47th Berlin International Film Festival and the Seattle International Film Festival. The Museum of Modern Art (MoMA) New York screened Twisted in its Cineprobe Series in 1997 and granted the director an honorarium for his work. MoMA screened the film again in 2013 as part of the museum's celebration of the Charles Dickens' bicentenary film series and inducted the film into their permanent film collection.

The film won the Audience Prize at the 12th Turin LGBT Film Festival (The Lovers Film Festival, formerly Da Sodoma a Hollywood Torino GLBT Film Festival) and Best First Feature at the Ottawa LGBT Inside Out Film and Video Festival.
