= 1807 in literature =

This article contains information about the literary events and publications of 1807.

== Events ==
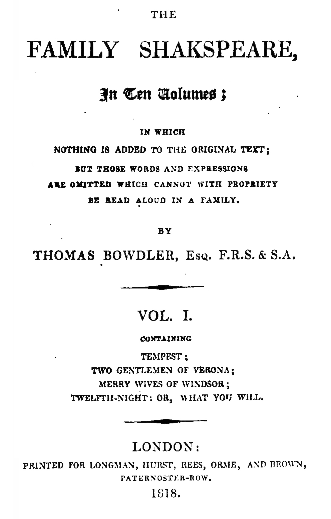
Title page of The Family Shakspeare, 1819 edition

- January – Heinrich von Kleist sets out for Dresden, but is arrested by the French as a spy and kept as a prisoner for six months at Châlons-sur-Marne.
- January 24 – Washington Irving launches the satirical magazine Salmagundi in New York City. Salmagundi lampooned New York City's culture and politics in a manner much like today's Mad magazine. It was in the November 11, 1807, issue that Irving first attached the name Gotham to New York City, based on the alleged stupidity of the people of Gotham, Nottinghamshire.
- June 24 – The Tout-Paris assist in the first production of the Panorama de Momus, a vaudeville by Marc-Antoine Désaugiers.
- July 13 – Heinrich von Kleist is released from prison in France.
- unknown dates
  - The first edition of The Family Shakspeare, an expurgated edition of Shakespeare's plays under the nominal editorship of Thomas Bowdler, but probably compiled mostly by his sister Henrietta Maria Bowdler, appears in London.
  - The first facsimile edition of the Shakespeare First Folio, edited by Francis Douce, is published in London by Edward and Joseph Wright.
  - Benjamin Tabart in London publishes the first printed version of The History of Jack and the Bean-Stalk.
  - Charles Wiley founds a print shop in Manhattan, which eventually grows into the John Wiley & Sons book publishing group.

== New books ==
=== Fiction ===
- Harriet Butler – Count Eugenio
- Charlotte Dacre – The Libertine
- Elizabeth Gunning – The Orphans of Snowdon
- Rachel Hunter – Family Annals
- William Henry Ireland – The Catholic
- Charles and Mary Lamb – Tales from Shakespeare
- Matthew Gregory Lewis – The Wood Daemon
- P. D. Manville – Lucinda
- Charles Maturin – The Fatal Revenge
- Mary Meeke – Julien
- Mary Pilkington – Ellen: Heiress of the Castle
- Anna Maria Porter – The Hungarian Brothers
- Regina Marie Roche – The Discarded Son
- Anne Louise Germaine de Stael – Corinne, or Italy
- Sarah Scudgell Wilkinson – The Castle Spectre

=== Drama ===
- Thomas John Dibdin –
  - Errors Excepted
  - Harlequin in his Element
  - Mother Goose
- Giovanni Giraud – Gelosie per equivoco
- William Godwin – Faulkener
- Sophia Lee – The Assignation
- Matthew Lewis – Adelgitha
- Thomas Morton – Town and Country
- John Tobin – The Curfew

=== Poetry ===
- James Hogg – The Mountain Bard
- William Wordsworth – Poems in Two Volumes

=== Non-fiction ===
- Antoine Alexandre Barbier – Dictionnaire des ouvrages anonymes et pseudonymes
- Jacob Boehme – Quarante Questions sur l'âme (translated into French by Louis Claude de Saint-Martin)
- Georg Wilhelm Friedrich Hegel – The Phenomenology of Spirit (Phänomenologie des Geistes)
- Gottlieb Hufeland – New Foundations of Political Economy (Neue Grundlegung der Staatswirthschaftskunst) (vol. 1)
- Alexander von Humboldt – Voyage aux régions équinoxiales du nouveau continent 1799–1804
- Thomas Paine – The Age of Reason
- Sydney Smith (as Peter Plymley) – Letters on the Subject of the Catholics (publication begins)
- Germaine de Staël – Corinne, ou l'Italie

== Births ==
- January 28 – Sophie Bolander, Swedish novelist (died 1869)
- February 27 – Henry Wadsworth Longfellow, American poet (died 1882)
- May 14 – Charlotta Djurström, Swedish actress and theatre manager (died 1877)
- June 30 – Friedrich Theodor Vischer, German author (died 1887)
- August 8 – Emilie Flygare-Carlén, Swedish author (died 1892)
- August 31 – Thomas Miller, English "ploughman poet" and novelist (died 1874)
- September 2 – Fredrika Runeberg, Finnish novelist and journalist (died 1879)
- September 9 – Richard Chenevix Trench, Anglo-Irish Anglican archbishop and poet (died 1886)
- October 8 – Harriet Taylor, English philosophical writer (died 1858)
- October 23 – Jemima von Tautphoeus, née Montgomery, Anglo-Irish-born novelist (died 1893)
- October 30 – Christopher Wordsworth, English Anglican bishop and Biblical scholar (died 1885)
- November 16 – Jónas Hallgrímsson, Icelandic poet (died 1845)
- December 17 – John Greenleaf Whittier, American Quaker poet and abolitionist, abolitionist (died 1892)

== Deaths ==
- January 5 – Isaac Reed, English Shakespearean editor (born 1742)
- February 18 – Sophie von La Roche, German novelist (born 1730)
- June 14 – Louis Bruyas, French dramatist and actor (born 1738)
- July 24 – John Christopher Kunze, American theologian (born 1744)
- August 1 – John Walker, English lexicographer (born 1732)
- December 3 – Clara Reeve, English novelist and literary historian (born 1729)
- December 19 – Friedrich Melchior, baron von Grimm, German-born French memoirist and literary correspondent (born 1723)
- December 21 – John Newton, English hymnist (born 1725)

== Sources ==
- Jones, Brian Jay. Washington Irving: An American Original. (Arcade, 2008) ISBN 978-1-55970-836-4
