= Erema =

1877 novel by R. D. Blackmore

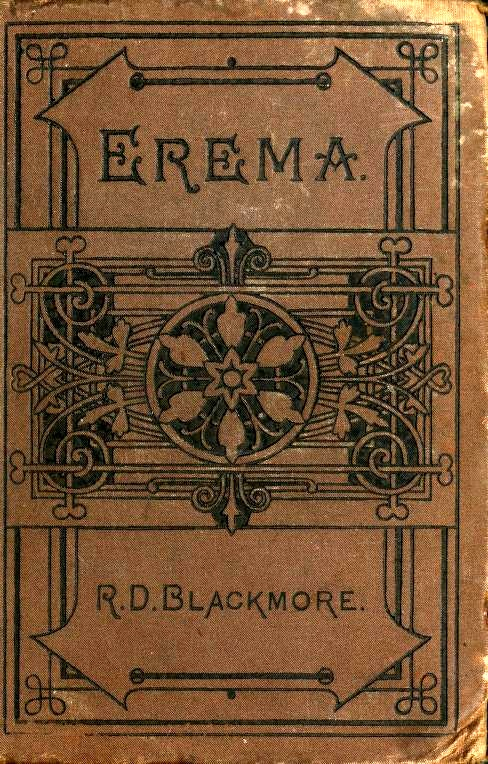
- Cover of the 1st edition
- Author: R. D. Blackmore
- Language: English
- Publisher: Smith, Elder, & Co.
- Publication date: 1877
- Publication place: United Kingdom
- Pages: Volume I: 282; volume II: 294; volume III: 308
- OCLC: 11272383

Erema; or, my father's sin is a three-volume novel by R. D. Blackmore published in 1877. The novel is narrated by a teenage girl called Erema whose father escaped from England having been charged with a murder he did not commit. Erema has grown up in exile with her father, and the story begins in California in the 1850s.

== Title ==
The name "Erema" is taken from a passage in the Greek tragedy Women of Trachis by Sophocles. The heroine of the play, Deianeira, is referred to as erēma (Greek: ἐρήμα) a word meaning "abandoned", used by the ancient Greeks for widows and orphans.

In 1884 Blackmore told a friend that Erema was "my most unlucky work ... which the British public would not have, partly because they knew not how to pronounce the name."

== Plot ==
The novel is narrated by the heroine of the story. Erema is the child of a Captain Castlewood, who had been imprisoned on a charge of murdering his father, an English peer, had made his escape from jail while the enquiry was pending, and spent the rest of his life in a miserable exile. His six children had died of diphtheria while he was in prison, and his wife had quickly followed them, leaving only Erema, a newborn infant, to share her father's exile and disgrace. Hand-in-hand these two have wandered together over the earth, till Erema has become a girl of fifteen, and fate brings the luckless pair to California. Here, in a wild parched region of desert, the father dies, and Erema is left solitary. But at this point of her story she is rescued and taken in hand by an old countryman of her father's, Sampson Gundry, who with his grandson, young Ephraim, works a sawmill in the district. He owns a stretch of country along the banks of the swift Blue River. He made a fortune, not by gold-digging, though the very soil he trod on sparkled with nuggets, but by cutting wood. He takes in the orphan child and rears her as his own.

In time Erema picks up the story of her father's life—the accusation of murder that had driven him abroad, but which had never been either proved or contradicted. At last she is determined to devote as much of her own life as shall be found necessary to clearing his memory from all shame and blame. With this purpose she crosses the Atlantic, visits her birthplace, and sets to work to hunt out the mystery. By a series of chances she succeeds in discovering the real murderer, and establishes the fact that her father was not only innocent of the crime, but had acted in silence a hero's part. Moreover, by the death of the reigning Lord Castlewood, her cousin, she comes into the family title and estates. Having completed her self-imposed mission, she sets out on her way back to California and the sawmill; reaches the other side of the Atlantic in time to help in nursing the sick and wounded in the civil war; and among them finds her old friends, Sampson Gundry and his grandson, arrayed on opposite sides in the war. The young peeress concludes her romantic history by becoming the wife of the sawyer's grandson.

== Publication ==
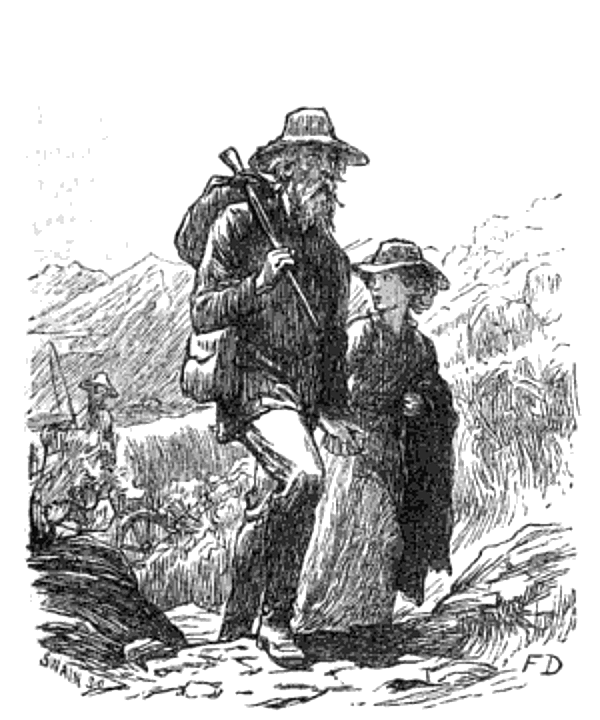
Erema and her father, drawn by Frank Dicksee

Erema was first serialised in Cornhill Magazine from November 1876 to November 1877. The magazine story came with illustrations by Frank Dicksee. The novel was then published (without pictures) as three volumes in 1877. A Dutch translation of the novel was published in 1880.

== Reception ==
Erema received very mixed reviews following its publication. The British Quarterly Review stated that "Erema cannot, we think, be ranked either for character or for picturesque description with Cradock Nowell or Lorna Doone, but it has characteristics of its own which make it stand quite apart from the ordinary library fiction." The Academy disliked the novel complaining that "Erema never [shows] qualities wholesomely girlish or womanly" and further opined that "the great fault of the story is [the] almost total lack in it of a love story." The Spectator went even further and said that the novel was "unworthy of Mr. Blackmore's talents ... he has only produced a third-rate magazine fiction, loose and wildly improbable in construction and incident, and most tedious in narration."

On the other hand, the Westminster Review stated that "in some respects we consider Erema his finest work," and George Barnett Smith in the International Review gave the novel high praise calling it "the greatest of the works of this author" and stating that "this novel is especially engrossing from its depth of human interest, and probably represents the high-water mark of Mr. Blackmore's genius".
