= Springhaven =

1887 novel by R. D. Blackmore

Springhaven: A Tale of the Great War
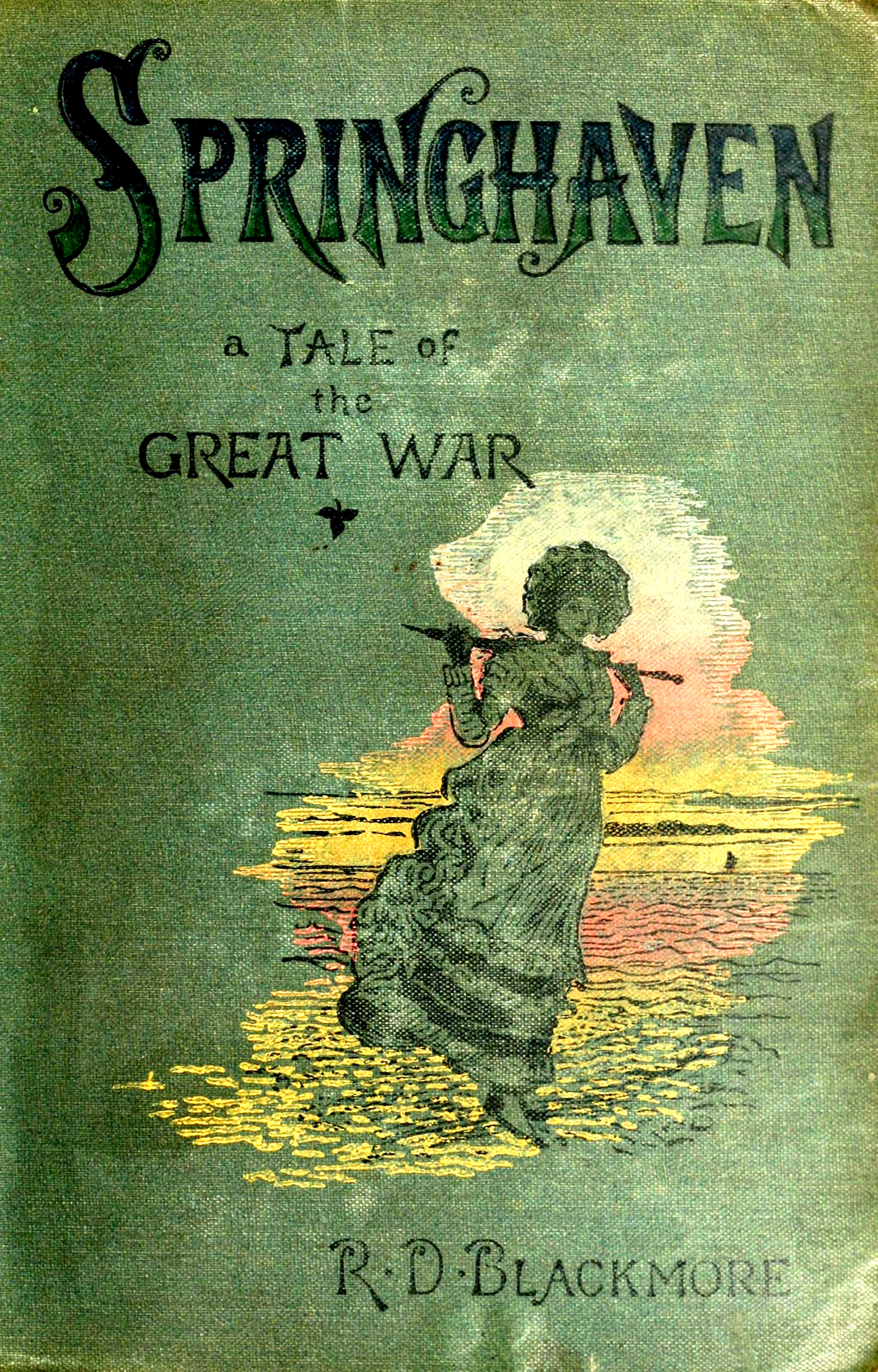
- Cover of the 1887 edition
- Author: R. D. Blackmore
- Language: English
- Publisher: Sampson Low, Marston, Searle & Rivington
- Publication date: 1887
- Publication place: London, United Kingdom
- Pages: 299 (vol. I), 296 (vol. II), 297 (vol. III)
- OCLC: 12962729

Springhaven: a tale of the Great War is a three-volume novel by R. D. Blackmore published in 1887. It is set in Sussex, England, during the time of the Napoleonic Wars, and revolves around the plots of the villainous Captain Caryl Carne who attempts to aid a French invasion.

== Overview ==
Springhaven is set in Sussex during the Napoleonic Wars. It is called "a Tale of the Great War," because Nelson and Napoleon are brought conspicuously on the scene, which is laid in the years preceding and following the Treaty of Amiens, and because it describes the Sussex coast at a time when an invasion was daily expected.

== Plot ==
The central villain of the tale is Captain Caryl Carne who is half-French and half-English. Whilst holding a commission in the French Army, he returns to his ruined ancestral castle near the coast of England, somewhere between Beachy Head and Brighton, and fills the vaults with gunpowder, keeps up constant communication with the camp at Boulogne, and prepares to aid a landing of the French.

Into this story comes Blyth Scudamore, otherwise "Captain Scuddy," who is sent into captivity in France, where he becomes acquainted with Carne's secrets. Other characters include Captain Zebedee Tugwell, who belongs to a family native to Springhaven; an Admiral Darling who commands on the coast; the wilful Dolly Darling, the admiral's daughter; Faith, Dolly's sister, whose boyfriend heads to the interior of Africa four years; Parson Twemlow, who wants to preach at Nelson; and both Nelson and Napoleon themselves who figure briefly in the novel.

== Publication ==
Springhaven was first serialised in Harper's Magazine from April 1886 to April 1887, and then published in three volumes in 1887. It continued to be reprinted well into the 20th century with an edition in the Everyman's Library as recently as 1969.

== Reception ==
Springhaven received rather mixed reviews. The Academy stated "there is his usual laborious style, with its elaborate conceits and rather puerile playing on words, but there is also much admirable description and pleasant dialogue ... the whole atmosphere is briskly naval, full of a healthy salt breeze and the movement and life of the ocean." Likewise The Spectator opined that "there is much to commend as well as amuse in Springhaven," but noted that the story "has many threads which are not properly interwoven, but dangle loosely about."

Blackmore himself thought that Springhaven was a better work than Lorna Doone, and he placed Springhaven second only to The Maid of Sker as his best novel.
