= Mary Anerley =

1880 novel by R. D. Blackmore

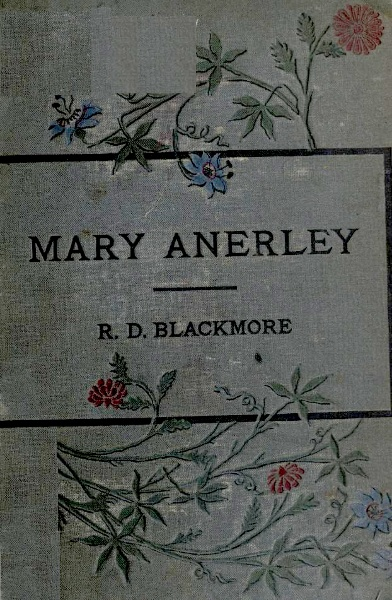
- Cover of the 1880 edition
- Author: R. D. Blackmore
- Language: English
- Publication date: 1880
- Publication place: United Kingdom

Mary Anerley: a Yorkshire tale is a three-volume novel by R. D. Blackmore published in 1880. It is set in the rugged landscape of Yorkshire's North Riding and the sea-coast of its East Riding.

== Plot introduction ==
The story opens in the year 1801 at Scargate Hall, "in the wildest and most rugged part of the wild and rough North Riding". The first chapter, essentially a prologue, sets forth the strangely dramatic death of Squire Philip Yordas just after he had made a will disinheriting his son Duncan. Thus Scargate Hall, when first described to the reader, is the property of Yordas's two daughters, Philippa Yordas and Eliza Carnaby. Mr. Jellicorse, the family lawyer, comes by chance upon evidence of a fatal flaw in the sisters' title to the estate, and rides over to acquaint them with this unpleasant fact.

In the book's sixth chapter, we are introduced to Anerley Farm, about 120 miles from Scargate Hall, and the home of Mary Anerley. As Mary rides down the hollow of the Dyke on the same morning Mr. Jellicorse leaves Scargate Hall, she falls in with a man who is running for his life from men who are pursuing and shooting at him. On impulse, she shows him a place where he can hide. The man is Robin Lyth, who as a child was found washed ashore in a little cove north of Flamborough Head and raised by foster parents. He is on the run from Captain Carroway, a coastguard officer. Love blossoms between Mary and Robin, but many things interfere with their romance.

== Publication ==
Mary Anerley was first serialised in Fraser's Magazine from July 1879 to September 1880, and then published as three volumes in 1880.

== Reception ==
Mary Anerley received good reviews upon publication. The Saturday Review called it "one of his happiest productions" and said that "it is full of the fine touches of observation and description, whether of people or of places, that have belonged to most of his novels, and there is a strong dramatic interest to be found in it." The Spectator called it "the best book he has written since Lorna Doone" and that "love and knowledge of Nature are among his chief and most charming characteristics; in none of his works are they displayed more bountifully than in this one."
