= 1875 in literature =

This article contains information about the literary events and publications of 1875.

== Events ==
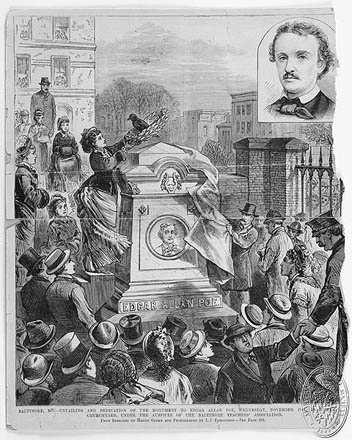
Edgar Allan Poe's reburial and new monument, October 1, 1875.

- January 16 – Henry James Byron's comedy Our Boys opens at the Vaudeville Theatre in London. It becomes the world's longest-running play until the 1890s, with 1,362 performances up to April 1879. It also opens this year in New York, at the New Fifth Avenue Theatre.
- February/March – Arthur Rimbaud meets Paul Verlaine in Stuttgart, Germany, after Verlaine's release from prison, and gives him the manuscript of his poems Illuminations. Rimbaud stops writing literature entirely at the age of 20.
- February 12 – Robert Louis Stevenson is introduced (by Leslie Stephen) to fellow writer W. E. Henley, at this time (August 1873–April 1875) a patient of surgeon Joseph Lister in the Royal Infirmary of Edinburgh. He will be the model for Long John Silver. Henley also meets his future wife while in hospital and writes the poems collected as In Hospital.
- April 28 – Henry James publishes Transatlantic Sketches.
- October 1 – American poet and short story writer Edgar Allan Poe is reburied in Westminster Hall and Burying Ground, Baltimore, Maryland, with a larger memorial marker. Controversy arises years later as to whether the correct body was exhumed.
- December 6 – The German emigrant ship SS Deutschland runs aground on the Kentish Knock off the English coast, causing the death of 157 passengers and crew and inspiring Gerard Manley Hopkins' poem The Wreck of the Deutschland. This introduces his innovative sprung rhythm and metre, but is rejected for publication in 1876. It will not appear finally until 1918.
- unknown dates
  - The Flammarion publishing firm is founded in Paris, France.
  - Isaac K. Funk establishes the U.S. publisher I. K. Funk & Company, predecessor of Funk & Wagnells.
  - Caroline M. Hewins begins a children's library in Hartford, Connecticut, after becoming librarian of the local Young Men's Institute.
  - Nebelspalter is founded by Jean Nötzli of Zürich (Switzerland) as an "illustrated humorous political weekly".

== New books ==
=== Fiction ===
- William Harrison Ainsworth
  - The Goldsmith's Wife
  - Preston Fight
- Jose de Alencar – Senhora
- William Black – Three Feathers
- Bjornstjerne Martinius Bjornson – Kaptejn Mansana (Captain Mansanna)
- R. D. Blackmore – Alice Lorraine
- Mary Elizabeth Braddon – Hostages to Fortune, A Strange World
- Wilkie Collins – The Law and the Lady
- Alphonse Daudet – Contes du Lundi
- John William De Forest – Playing the Mischief
- Fyodor Dostoevsky – The Adolescent
- Bonifaciu Florescu – Etiam contra omnes (Even against All)
- Benito Pérez Galdós – Saragossa
- Josiah Gilbert Holland – The Story of Sevenoaks
- William Dean Howells – A Foregone Conclusion
- Henry James – Roderick Hudson, The Passionate Pilgrim and Other Stories
- Julia Kavanagh – John Dorrien
- Helen Mathers – Comin' thro' the Rye
- Karl May – Old Firehand
- José Maria de Eça de Queiroz – O Crime do Padre Amaro (The Crime of Father Amaro: Scenes of Religious Life)
- George Sand – Flamarande
- Maurice Thompson – Hoosier Mosaics
- Anthony Trollope – The Way We Live Now (serial publication ends in September; publication in two book volumes in June)
- Jules Verne – The Survivors of the Chancellor (Le Chancellor: Journal du passager J.-R. Kazallon) and "The Mysterious Island"
- Constance Fenimore Woolson – Castle Nowhere: Lake Country Sketches
- Edmund Yates – Two, by Tricks
- Charlotte Mary Yonge – The Brother's Wife
- Émile Zola – La Faute de l'Abbé Mouret (The Sin of Father Mouret)

=== Children and young people ===
- Georgina Castle Smith – Froggy's Little Brother (approximate year)
- Louisa May Alcott – Eight Cousins
- George MacDonald – The Lost Princess (originally The Wise Woman)
- Mary Louisa Molesworth (Mrs. Molesworth) – Tell Me a Story

=== Drama ===
- Bjørnstjerne Bjørnson – En fallit (The Bankrupt)
- Henri de Bornier – La Fille de Roland
- H. J. Byron – Our Boys
- Augustin Daly - The Big Bonanza
- José Echegaray – En el puño de la espada (The Handle of the Sword)
- Guy de Maupassant – À la feuille de rose, maison turque
- Alfred Tennyson – Queen Mary

=== Poetry ===
- Wilfrid Scawen Blunt – Sonnets and Songs of Proteus
- Robert Browning – Aristophanes' Apology
- Alice Meynell – Preludes
- See also 1875 in poetry

=== Non-fiction ===
- Allgemeine Deutsche Biographie, vol. 1
- Matthew Arnold – God and the Bible
- Bartolomé de las Casas (died 1566) – History of the Indies (written 1527–61)
- Thomas Carlyle – The Early Kings of Norway
- Swami Dayanand – Satyarth Prakash
- Charles Wentworth Dilke (died 1864) – Papers of a Critic
- Edward Dowden – Shakspere: A Critical Study of His Mind and Art
- Mary Baker Eddy – Science and Health with Key to the Scriptures
- Warren Felt Evans – Soul and Body
- Francis Galton – "The History of Twins, as a criterion of the relative powers of nature and nurture" (Fraser's Magazine, vol. 12, pp. 566–76)
- Charles Greville (diarist) – Memoirs
- Augustus Hare – Days Near Rome
- Henry James – Transatlantic Sketches
- William Macready – Macready's Reminiscences and Selections from his Diaries and Letters
- Charles Nordhoff (journalist) – Communistic Societies of the United States
- Mark Pattison – Isaac Casaubon, 1559–1614
- Baron Jules Dupotet de Sennevoy – La Magie dévoilée
- William Tecumseh Sherman – Memoirs
- George Smith (Assyriologist) – Assyrian Discoveries: An Account of Explorations and Discoveries on the Site of Nineveh, During 1873 to 1874 (on the discovery of the Epic of Gilgamesh)
- Lysander Spooner – Vices Are Not Crimes, A Vindication of Moral Liberty
- Leslie Stephen – Hours in a Library, Volume 1
- John Addington Symonds
  - The Age of the Despots (first volume of Renaissance in Italy)
  - Picturesque Europe

== Births ==
- January 4 – William Williams (Crwys), Welsh poet (died 1968)
- February 8 – Valentine O'Hara, Irish author and authority on Russia and Baltic (died 1945)
- March 30 – Edmund Clerihew Bentley, English writer (died 1956)
- April 1 – Edgar Wallace (Richard Horatio Edgar), English thriller writer (died 1932)
- April 9 – Jacques Futrelle, American author (died in Titanic 1912)
- April 18
  - Oskar Ernst Bernhardt (Abdruschin), German author (died 1941)
  - Katherine Thurston (Katherine Cecil Madden), Irish novelist (died 1911)
- June 6 – Thomas Mann, German novelist and Nobel Prize winner (died 1955)
- June 24 – Forrest Reid, Irish novelist and literary critic (died 1947)
- July 9 – W. W. Greg, English literary scholar (died 1959)
- July 19 – Alice Dunbar Nelson African American poet, journalist and political activist of the Harlem Renaissance (died 1935)
- July 26 – Antonio Machado, Spanish poet (died 1939)
- August 2 – Helena Romer-Ochenkowska, Polish writer, playwright, opinion journalist and theatre critic (died 1947)
- August 21 – Winnifred Eaton, Canadian author (died 1954)
- August 26 – John Buchan, Scottish novelist and diplomat (died 1940)
- September 1 – Edgar Rice Burroughs, American popular novelist (died 1950)
- October 13 – Armand Praviel, French poet, novelist, and journalist (died 1944)
- October 25 – Carolyn Sherwin Bailey, American author and educator (died 1961)
- October – George Ranetti, Romanian humorist and playwright (died 1928)
- December 4 – Rainer Maria Rilke, Austrian poet (died 1926)
- unknown date – Gertrude Minnie Faulding, English children's writer and novelist (died 1961)

== Deaths ==
- January 3 – Pierre Larousse, French grammarian and lexicographer (born 1817)
- January 23 – Charles Kingsley, English novelist and cleric (born 1819)
- March 1 – Tristan Corbière, French poet (born 1845)
- March 25 – Louis Amédée Achard, French novelist (born 1814)
- April 20 – Emilia Marryat, English children's writer (born c. 1835)
- June 2 – Józef Kremer, Polish philosopher (born 1806)
- June 4 – Eduard Mörike, German poet (born 1804)
- June 18 – António Feliciano de Castilho, Portuguese poet and author (born 1800)
- August 4 – Hans Christian Andersen, Danish fairy-tale writer (born 1805)
- August 12 – János Kardos, Slovenian Evangelical priest, teacher, and writer (born 1801)
- August 19 – Robert Elis (Cynddelw), Welsh writer (born 1812)
- October 10 – Aleksey Konstantinovich Tolstoy, Russian poet, novelist and dramatist (born 1817)
- October 24 – Jacques Paul Migne, French priest, theologian, and publisher (born 1800)
- November 17 – Hilario Ascasubi, Argentine poet (born 1807)
