= Cradock Nowell =

1866 novel by R. D. Blackmore

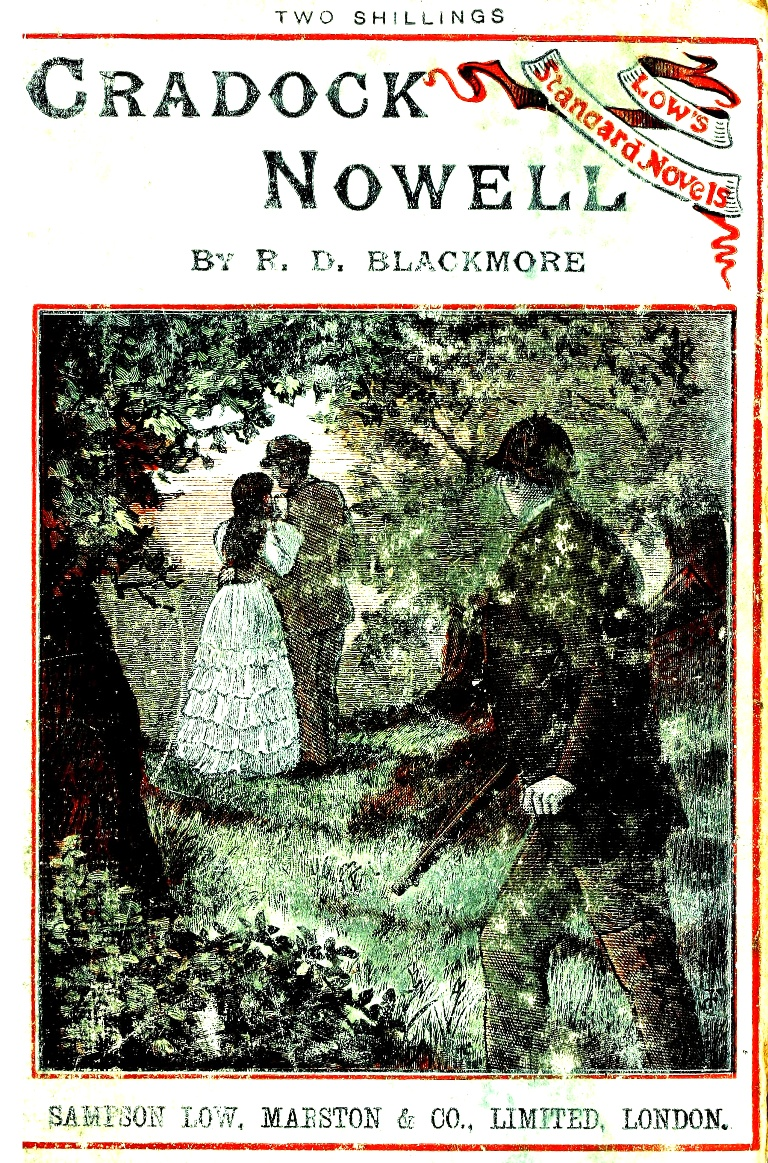
- Cover of the 1893 edition
- Author: R. D. Blackmore
- Language: English
- Publication date: 1866
- Publication place: United Kingdom

Cradock Nowell: a tale of the New Forest is a three-volume novel by R. D. Blackmore published in 1866. Set in the New Forest and in London, it follows the fortunes of Cradock Nowell who is thrown out of his family home by his father following the suspicious death of Cradock's twin brother Clayton. It was Blackmore's second novel, and the novel he wrote prior to his most famous work Lorna Doone.

== Title and writing ==
Cradock Nowell was Blackmore's second novel, following the publication of Clara Vaughan in 1864. Blackmore adopted the name "Cradock Nowell" from a former owner of Nottage Court in Glamorganshire – the house where Blackmore spent some of his childhood. The name is conspicuous on a tablet in the church of Newton Nottage, which Blackmore said he used to gaze at as a child during the sermon. The main setting for Cradock Nowell is the New Forest in Hampshire. Blackmore only knew Hampshire from visits and fishing trips, and relied on the 1863 book The New Forest: Its History and Scenery by John Wise. Cradock Nowell is notable for its evocative descriptions of landscape, the seasons, and the weather, which would prove to be characteristic of his next novel Lorna Doone.

Blackmore experienced some editorial meddling when writing the novel. He would later write to a friend that: "Cradock Nowell was spoiled by Macmillan's Magazine. I was repeatedly interfered with, and never left to my own course." He would later revise and release a new edition of the novel in 1873.

== Plot introduction ==
The story introduces twin brothers, Cradock and Clayton Nowell, whose nurse forgets which is the elder, the rosette by which she had distinguished them having fallen to the ground. She settles it to her own satisfaction, and the boys grow up under the care of their father, Sir Cradock Nowell, and their father’s friend, John Rosedew, the rector. Cradock falls in love with love Amy Rosedew, the rector's daughter. When the brothers are on the threshold of adulthood, an unwelcome guest comes in the person of a regimental surgeon, who had attended at the birth of the twins, and he discovers the mistake of the nurse. Not long afterwards the older brother, the one who had just stepped into his brother’s place, is discovered shot dead in a lonely coppice, while the younger brother Cradock, with both barrels of his gun discharged, is standing close beside him. The father believes his son guilty, and drives him from his presence. The rest of the tale is chiefly taken up by the account of what becomes of Cradock Nowell, and how at length he is restored to his home and to his father.

== Publication ==
Cradock Nowell was first serialised in Macmillan's Magazine from May 1865 to August 1866, and then published as three volumes in 1866. It was fully revised in 1873; went through multiple editions from 1874 to 1893; and published once more in 1902.

== Reception ==
Cradock Nowell received rather mixed reviews. The Athenaeum praised it for being "a clever novel, decidedly original in style and mode of treatment" as well as for its "excellent descriptions of forest scenery" but then noted that "the style is overlaid with mannerisms and affectation; the author is in love with inverted forms of phraseology, which are not English idioms; and he delights in far-fetched words and pedantic epithets." The Westminster Review liked "the way in which he manages descriptions not merely of natural scenery, but of any other kind" but complained about the "muscular brutality" to be found in the final two volumes. Nevertheless the Dictionary of National Biography noted that "Cradock Nowell is one of the best of Blackmore's heroes, and in Amy Rosedew he gave the world one of the most bewitching of heroines."

== 1873 revision ==
Following the adverse reviews, and the editorial interference he had received from Macmillan's Magazine, Blackmore chose to fully revise the novel prior to its re-publication in 1873. The new edition is described as "diligently revised and reshapen" and Blackmore states in the preface that "the present writer has done his best to mend the error of his ways." In the same year he advised a friend that "if you read it [Cradock Nowell] at all, try the new one-volume edition, which has lately cost me months of revision, and reshaping."
