= The Maid of Sker =

Three-volume novel by R. D. Blackmore

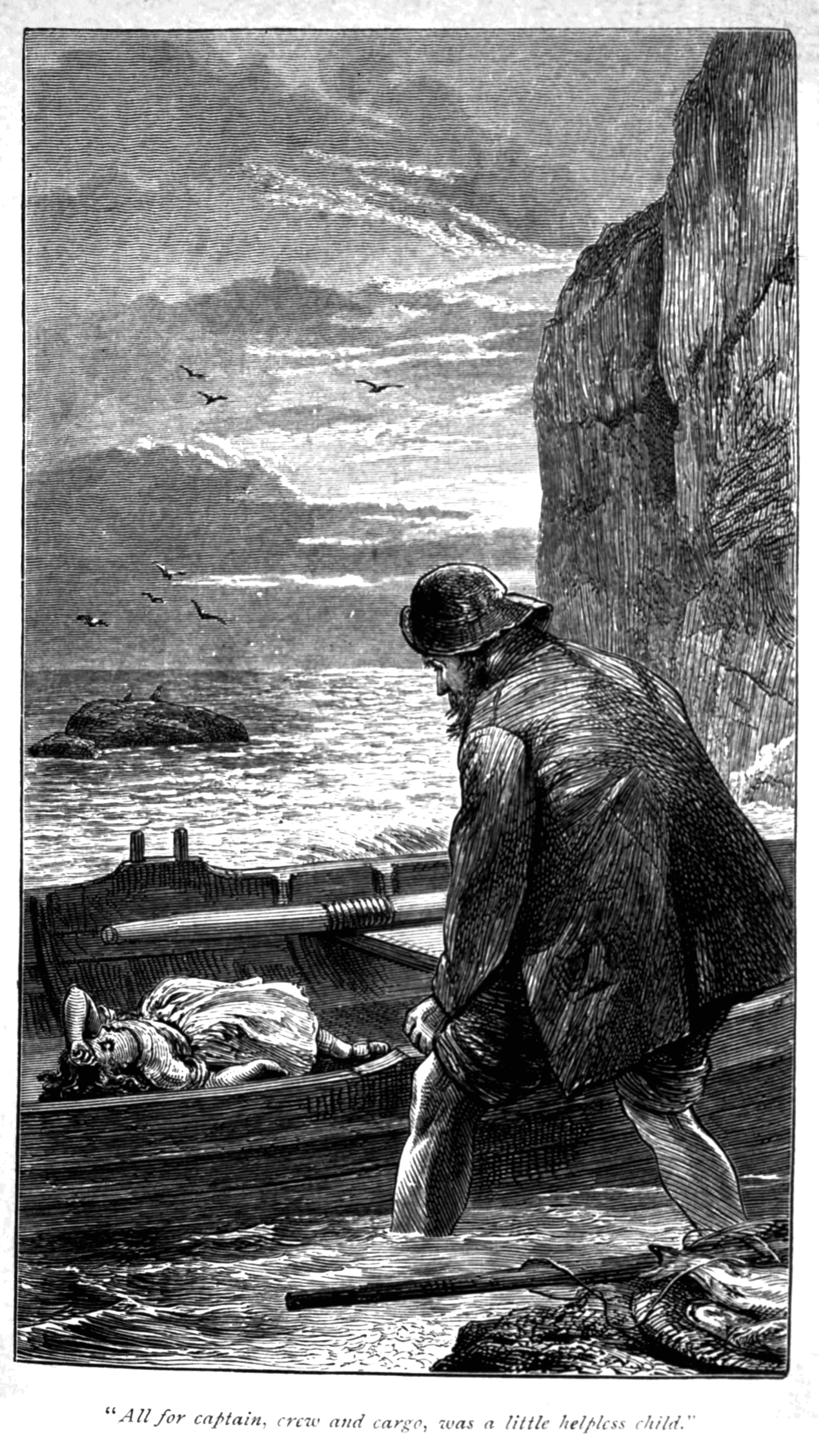
- Frontispiece to the 1893 edition
- Author: R. D. Blackmore
- Language: English
- Publication date: 1872
- Publication place: United Kingdom

The Maid of Sker is a three-volume novel that was written by R. D. Blackmore and published in 1872. The novel is set in the late 18th century and is about an elderly fisherman who unravels the mysterious origins of a foundling child who is washed ashore on the coast of Glamorganshire, South Wales. It was published subsequent to Blackmore's Lorna Doone, although he had begun writing The Maid of Sker 25 years earlier. Blackmore considered The Maid of Sker to be his best novel.

== Title and writing ==
The novel's title comes from a Welsh ballad known as The Maid of Sker (Welsh: Y Ferch o'r Sger), although the content of the ballad bears little relation to the plot of the novel. Blackmore was also familiar with Sker House near Porthcawl, Glamorgan. Blackmore's mother Anne (née Knight) was from Nottage Court near Porthcawl and Blackmore spent part of his childhood with his aunt in Nottage. The stark form of Sker House is a central image for Blackmore, who began writing the novel while he was a student at Oxford University. He graduated in 1847 but the book was not completed and published until 1872, three years after the publication of Lorna Doone.

== Plot ==
The Maid of Sker is set at the end of the 18th century; the story is told by Davy Llewellyn, an elderly fisherman, and is about a two-year-old girl who in a calm before a storm, drifts in a boat onto a beach in Glamorganshire. The little girl calls herself Bardie. Davy is tempted to keep the girl but decides to give her up and keep the boat for himself. He quarters the pretty child in a simple but wealthy household in his neighbourhood. As Bardie grows up, Davy dotes upon her, watching anxiously over her fortunes, partly or principally because he thinks his own fortune may be bound up with hers. It is clear from the refinement of the girl's manners and from the quality of the clothes she was washed ashore in that she is no common child.

Davy joins the crew of a ketch that trades between Porthcawl and Barnstaple, Devon. Whilst in Devon, he encounters several characters who hold the key to solving the mystery of Bardie's origins. These include Sir Philip Bampfylde, who spends most of his time looking for his two grandchildren who have mysteriously disappeared; Parson Chowne, a wicked, demonic and crafty parson who defies the law for many years in the north of Devon; and Captain Drake Bamfylde, who is under suspicion of having abducted his elder brother Philip's children and heirs to the family property. Davy gradually unravels the mystery and sets matters right, although many distractions, including an extended period at sea in which Blackmore gives a graphic account of the Battle of the Nile, delay him.

== Publication ==
The Maid of Sker was serialized in Blackwood's Magazine from August 1871 to July 1872. It was then published as a three-volume novel in 1872.

== Reception ==
The Maid of Sker received fairly good reviews. The Saturday Review stated "the book is exceedingly able, and strikingly original ... there is much powerful writing in it, a great deal of dry humour, with some touches of rare pathos". The Spectator regarded it as "a genuine success, one of the few good novels that has been written for many years", although it also said it "is here and there just a little difficult to follow ... the story must run over a course of years which it may tax even the author of Waverley to render interesting".

Blackmore regarded The Maid of Sker as his best novel, both as an expression of his own personality and in workmanship.
