= Christowell =

1882 novel by R. D. Blackmore

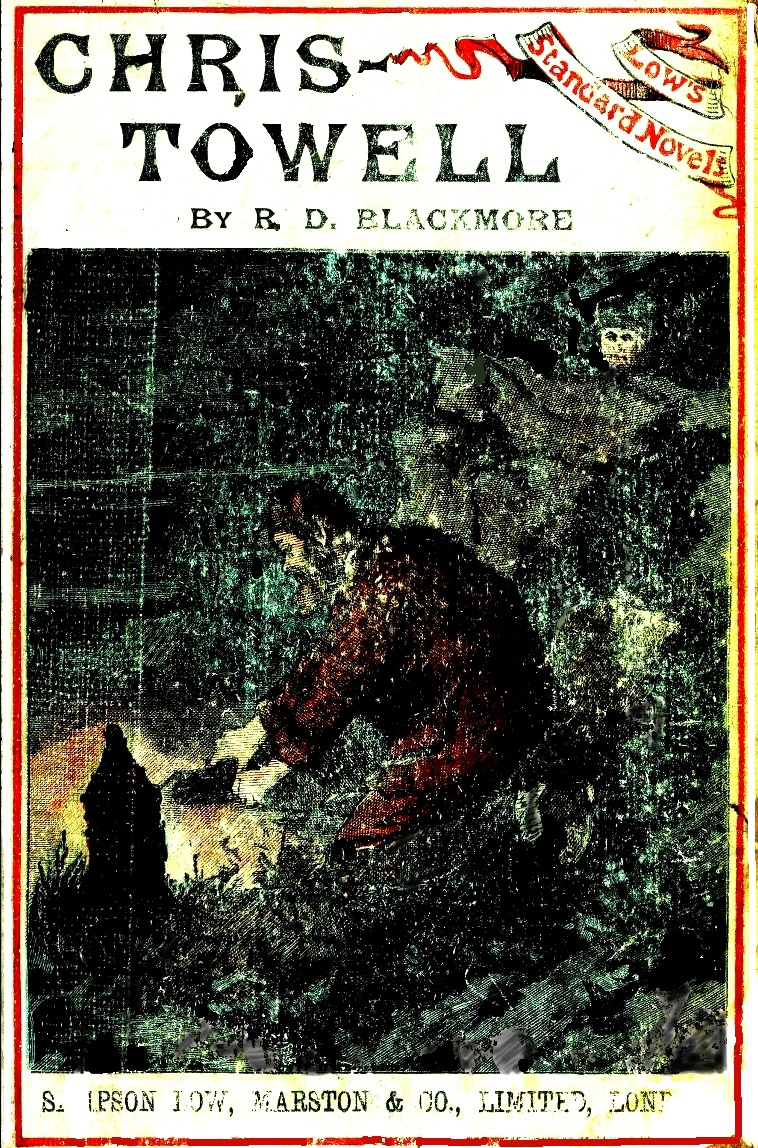
- Cover of the 1891 edition
- Author: R. D. Blackmore
- Language: English
- Publication date: 1882
- Publication place: United Kingdom

Christowell: a Dartmoor tale is a three-volume novel by R. D. Blackmore published in 1882. It is set in the fictional village of Christowell on the eastern edge of Dartmoor.

== Title ==
The title derives from the village of Christow on Dartmoor. Although Blackmore was keen to point out that "Christow is not my Christowell: though I took the name partly from it ... my Christowell is a compound of several places."

== Plot introduction ==
The complex and picturesque life which goes on in the parish of Christowell is the theme of the novel. The story begins with the garden where resides “Captain Larks,” alias Mr. Arthur, who is neither Mr. Arthur nor "Captain Larks," but a mysterious soldier who renounced his own good name to save one who was his brother and fellow officer from disgrace. Misfortune has driven him into retirement, and so he lives among his flowers and fruit. Nobody knows anything about him, save the clergyman, Parson Short. Mr. Arthur has a daughter, Rose, who, after visiting him as a child during her holidays for several years, at last comes to live with him at his cottage. It is when she appears, however, that her father's troubles may be said to begin; for she falls in love with Jack Westcombe the son of a retired officer, whom Rose's father declines to see, conscious of the cloud that rests on himself.

Among other characters there are Pugsley the carrier, Sir Joseph Touchwood, who has made a fortune out of shoes supplied by contract to Lord Wellington's army, Julia Touchwood, and a Richard ("Dicky") Touchwood who achieves small honors at Cambridge, but greater ones at home as a rat-catcher. The villain of the plot is a Mr. Gaston who attempts every crime from murder to bribery to compass his ends, and succeeds in hoodwinking every one for some time and keeping Mr. Arthur out of his lawful inheritance.

== Publication ==
Christowell was serialized in Good Words from January to December 1881. It was then published as a three-volume novel in 1882.

== Reception ==
The novel received fairly good reviews. The Oxford Magazine stated that the novel was "nearly equal" to his others, but mentioned the "weakness [which] lies in the artistic treatment of the details of the plot." The Academy complained that "Blackmore's characters are too consistently clever", but nevertheless opined that "it is a book to be enjoyed leisurely". Blackwood's Magazine wrote that "he is never more entertaining than at this homely level, on page after page, which in other books we should skip, but which here we enjoy as we should a walk in the company of the most genial and gentle of humorists."
