= Kit and Kitty =

1890 novel by R. D. Blackmore

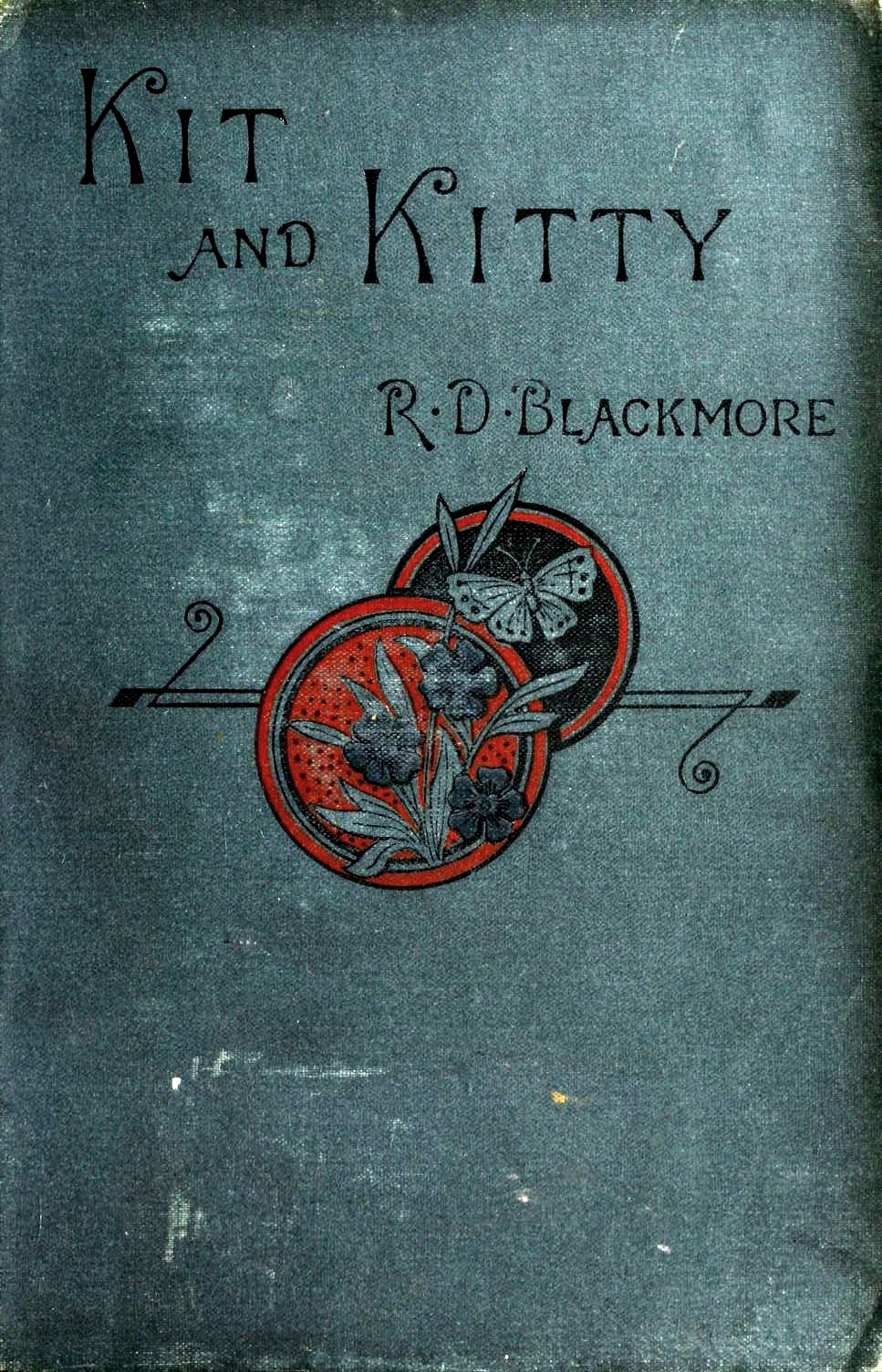
- Cover of the 1890 edition
- Author: R. D. Blackmore
- Language: English
- Publication date: 1890
- Publication place: United Kingdom

Kit and Kitty: a story of west Middlesex is a three-volume novel by R. D. Blackmore published in 1890. It is set near Sunbury-on-Thames in Middlesex.

== Plot ==
The novel is set in and around "Uncle Corny's" garden near Sunbury-on-Thames. The story turns on the love of Kit, the market-gardener's nephew, for Kitty, the daughter of a good, but foolish scientific man, who has succeeded in making his own and his daughter's life miserable by marrying a second wife. This lady and her son Donovan are the villains of the story, and by their machinations poor Kit and Kitty are separated and made miserable.

The course of true love is thwarted both before and after marriage: Kitty, for example, being stolen from her bridegroom during the honeymoon. Poetic justice is amply wreaked in the end on all ill-doers in an accumulation of horrors, including a parricide, a suicide, a leper husband returned to claim his wife, and her collapse from the shock into paralysis and imbecility.

== Publication ==
Kit and Kitty was first published as three volumes in 1890.

== Reception ==
Kit and Kitty received mixed reviews. The Guardian found the book "interesting, well written, and very pleasant to read." The Dublin Review reckoned that "Mr. Blackmore's gift of story-telling enables him to silence common-sense with a wave of his magician's wand." The Eclectic Magazine even reckoned that the novel would "rank among this great novelist's best work." The Spectator enjoyed the first volume with its suburban idyll, but found the rest of the story to be "melodrama ... of the cheapest kind, with impossible villains, incredible plots, and a final scene of butchery which rivals the close of the last act of Hamlet." It also complained about the "aggressive" use of "the technical details of fruit-growing" as a theme.
