= Cripps the Carrier =

1876 novel by R. D. Blackmore

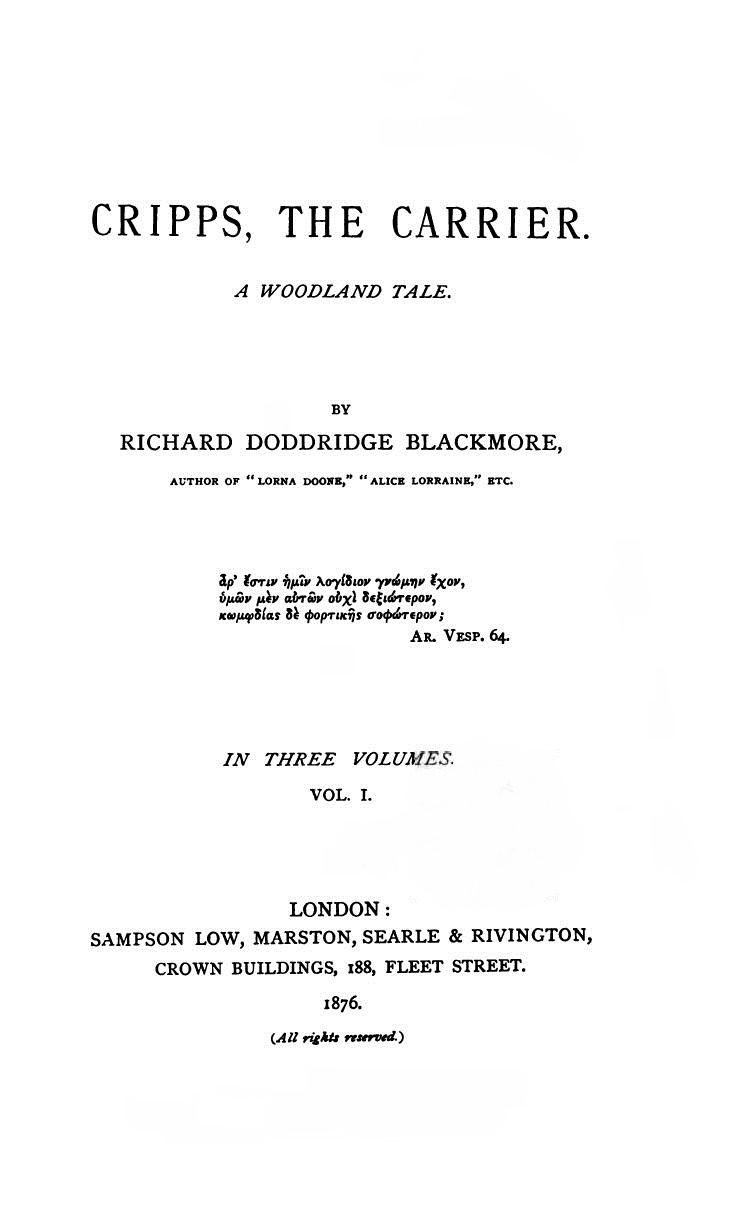
- First edition title page
- Author: R. D. Blackmore
- Language: English
- Publisher: Sampson Low, Marston, & Company
- Publication date: 1876
- Publication place: United Kingdom

Cripps the Carrier: a woodland tale, is a novel by Richard Doddridge Blackmore, author of Lorna Doone. It was first published in 1876 and is set in and around the village of Beckley in the rural area of Headington just outside Oxford to the east and on the road to London.

== Plot ==
The story is set in the 1830s in rural Oxfordshire. The main thread of the narrative follows the fortunes or misfortunes of Grace Oglander, the daughter of an Oxfordshire Squire. She is borne off from the residence of her aunt by the machinations of a villainous attorney, who entraps her into his power by the expedient of a forged letter from her father. The latter, anxiously expecting his daughter's return, receives by the carrier a sack of potatoes, and in it a long coil of bright golden hair, accompanied by the brutal superscription—"All you will ever see of her."

Scarcely a doubt remains in his mind as to the fate of poor Grace, and his fears are confirmed by the testimony of Esther Cripps, the carrier's sister, who, in a belated walk, is the witness of a ghastly deed—the burial of the uncoffined body of a young girl in a ravine called the "Gipsy's Grave."

Grace herself is in the meantime safely ensconced in the depths of the Oxford forest under the care of Miss Patch, the governess, and makes such good use of her natural gifts that she enthrals the heart of Kit Sharp, the attorney's son. For him, both she and her large fortune were designed by his unscrupulous father; but an unforeseen difficulty is interposed by the traitorous conduct of Kit himself. When he discovers that the girl is not an American, as he was led to suppose, but the daughter of Squire Oglander, he resolves to restore her to her father's roof; and this he succeeds in doing with the timely assistance of "Cripps the Carrier."

The story describes the flight of Grace Oglander and her new protector, the conflict between father and son, and the eventual rescue of the maiden by the carrier. The attorney strikes his son dead, as he thinks, and then appropriately closes his career by blowing his own brains out in the forest.

== Publication ==
Cripps the Carrier was first published in three volumes in 1876.
