= Lucinda =

Lucinda may refer to:

- Lucinda (given name), people with the given name Lucinda
- Lucinda, Queensland, a town in Australia
- Lucinda (steam yacht), a steam yacht of the Queensland Government
- Lucinda, a 1799 novel by Friedrich von Schlegel
- Lucinda (novel), a novel by P. D. Manvill first published in 1807
- Lucinda, a 1920 novel by Anthony Hope
- "Lucinda", a song by The Knack from the 1979 album Get the Knack
- "Lucinda", a song by Tom Waits from the 2006 album Orphans: Brawlers, Bawlers & Bastards
