= Poems by Melanter =

Poems by Melanter is an 1853 collection of poems by English novelist R.D. Blackmore.
