= Dictionnaire des ouvrages anonymes et pseudonymes =

The Dictionnaire des ouvrages anonymes et pseudonymes whose full title is Dictionnaire des ouvrages anonymes et pseudonymes composés, traduits ou publiés en français, avec les noms des auteurs, traducteurs et éditeurs, is a four volume (1806–1809) dictionary by Antoine Alexandre Barbier listing pen names for French and Latin authors.
