= Clara Vaughan =

English sensation novel

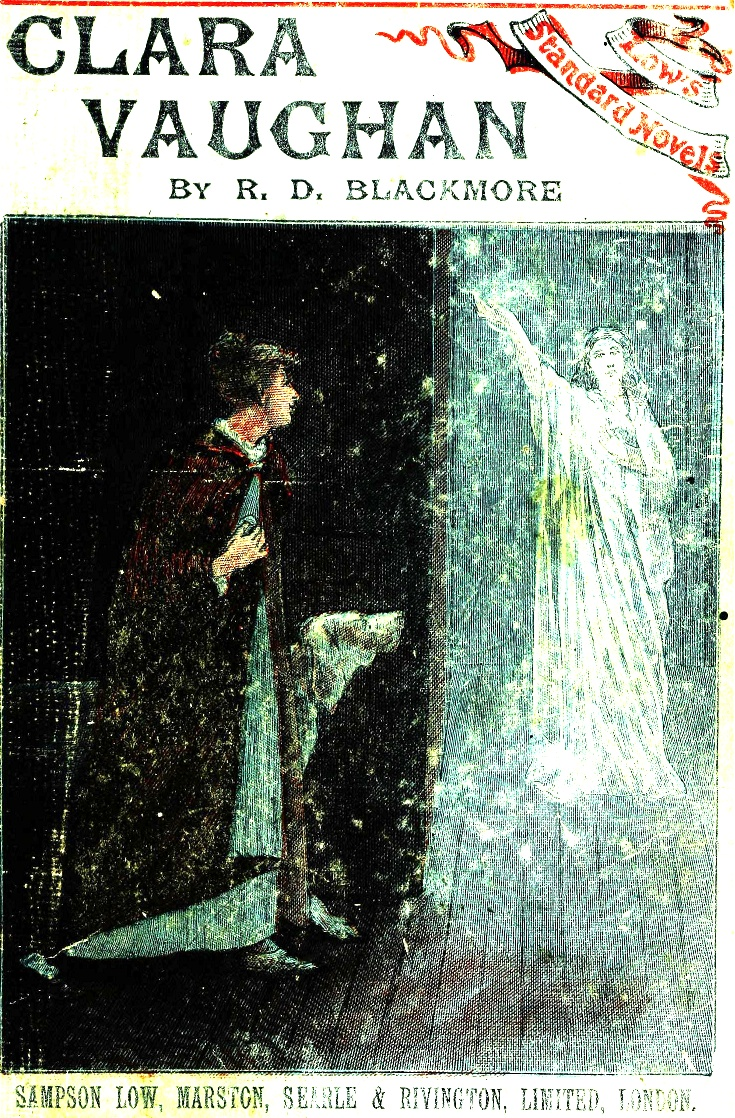
- Cover of 1889 Edition of Clara Vaughan
- Author: R. D. Blackmore
- Language: English
- Genre: Sensation novel
- Publisher: Macmillan & Co.
- Publication date: 1864
- Publication place: England
- Media type: Print

Clara Vaughan is a sensation novel by R. D. Blackmore, who was later to achieve lasting fame for another romantic novel, Lorna Doone. Clara Vaughan, his first novel, was written in 1853 and published anonymously in 1864.

The novel, which takes place in the mid-19th century, is the story of the eponymous heroine, an only child whose father is mysteriously murdered when she is a young girl. As a young woman, she sets out to uncover the identity of her father's killer, and for this reason the novel is often classed among the first detective novels in English. In addition to this overarching theme, there are several sub-plots involving family secrets, romances, and questions of familial inheritance.

== Publication ==
The novel was first published in 1864. It was still in print in various editions into the early 20th century and remains in print to this day. It was generally well received by the public, although some reviewers at the time ascribed it to Mary Elizabeth Braddon. Others criticised the author for lack of knowledge of the law.

== Revision ==
Blackmore chose to revise the novel fully for a new edition with his authorship acknowledged in 1872. There he states in a preface that he removed "many things offensive to maturer taste and judgement".
