= The Hungarian Brothers =

1807 novel

- Author: Anna Maria Porter
- Language: English
- Genre: Romance
- Publisher: Longman
- Publication date: 1807
- Publication place: United Kingdom
- Media type: Print

The Hungarian Brothers is an 1807 romance novel by the British writer Anna Maria Porter, originally published in three volumes. It is set against the background of the French Revolutionary Wars of the 1790s in the Habsburg Empire. It was a popular success and she reached a critical peak with this and several subsequent historical romances.

== Bibliography ==
- Hawkins, Ann R. Blackwell, Catherine, S. & Bonds, E. Leigh. The Routledge Companion to Romantic Women Writers. Taylor & Francis, 2022.
- Towsey, Mark & Roberts, Kyle B. . Before the Public Library: Reading, Community and Identity in the Atlantic World, 1650-1850. BRILL, 2017.
