= Alice Lorraine =

1875 novel by R. D. Blackmore

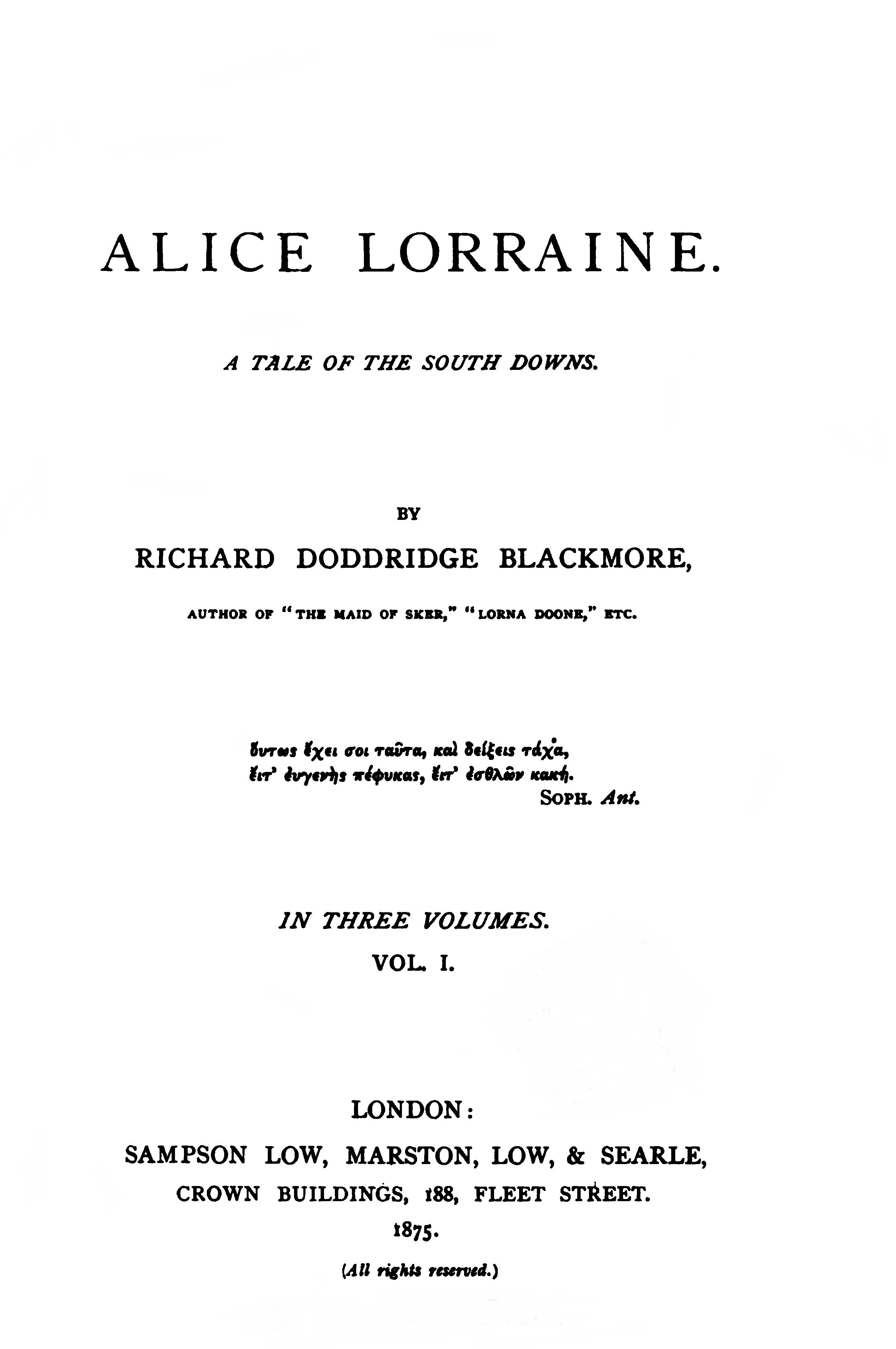
- First edition title page
- Author: R. D. Blackmore
- Language: English
- Genre: Sensation novel
- Publisher: Sampson Low
- Publication date: 1875
- Publication place: England
- Media type: Print

Alice Lorraine: a tale of the South Downs is a novel by R. D. Blackmore, published in 1875. Set in Sussex and Spain during the Napoleonic Wars, the novel recounts the divergent tales of the eponymous heroine and her brother in their efforts to save the noble Lorraine family from ruin.

== Plot summary ==
The story is set in the early years of the 19th century. The hero and heroine, brother and sister, are children of Sir Roland Lorraine, representative of a very ancient family. Hilary, while studying for the bar in London, falls in love with the daughter of a Kentish farmer, the sister of his fellow-pupil. He confesses his folly to his father, who at once buys for him a commission in a regiment of foot on service in Spain. The young man distinguishes himself at Badajos, and is on the high road to fame, when he falls under the spell of a Spanish countess, and forgets for a time his promise to the Kentish girl. Through the countess's treachery he loses £50,000, military funds, with which he is entrusted, and leaves the army. Meantime his sister has been fighting a severe battle at home—defending herself against a plot to make her the wife of a drunken fellow named Chapman. Hilary comes home; Mabel, the Kentish girl, is sent for, and matters are serene with all but Alice on the day appointed for her wedding. When the hour for the ceremony approaches, she walks out and throws herself into the river, is carried a mile, rescued and resuscitated.

== Publication ==
Alice Lorraine was first serialised in Blackwood's Magazine from March 1874 to April 1875, and then published as three volumes in 1875. A review in the Graphic described it as “a graceful and pretty idyll of which we should not care to lose a line.”
