= Dariel =

1897 novel by R. D. Blackmore

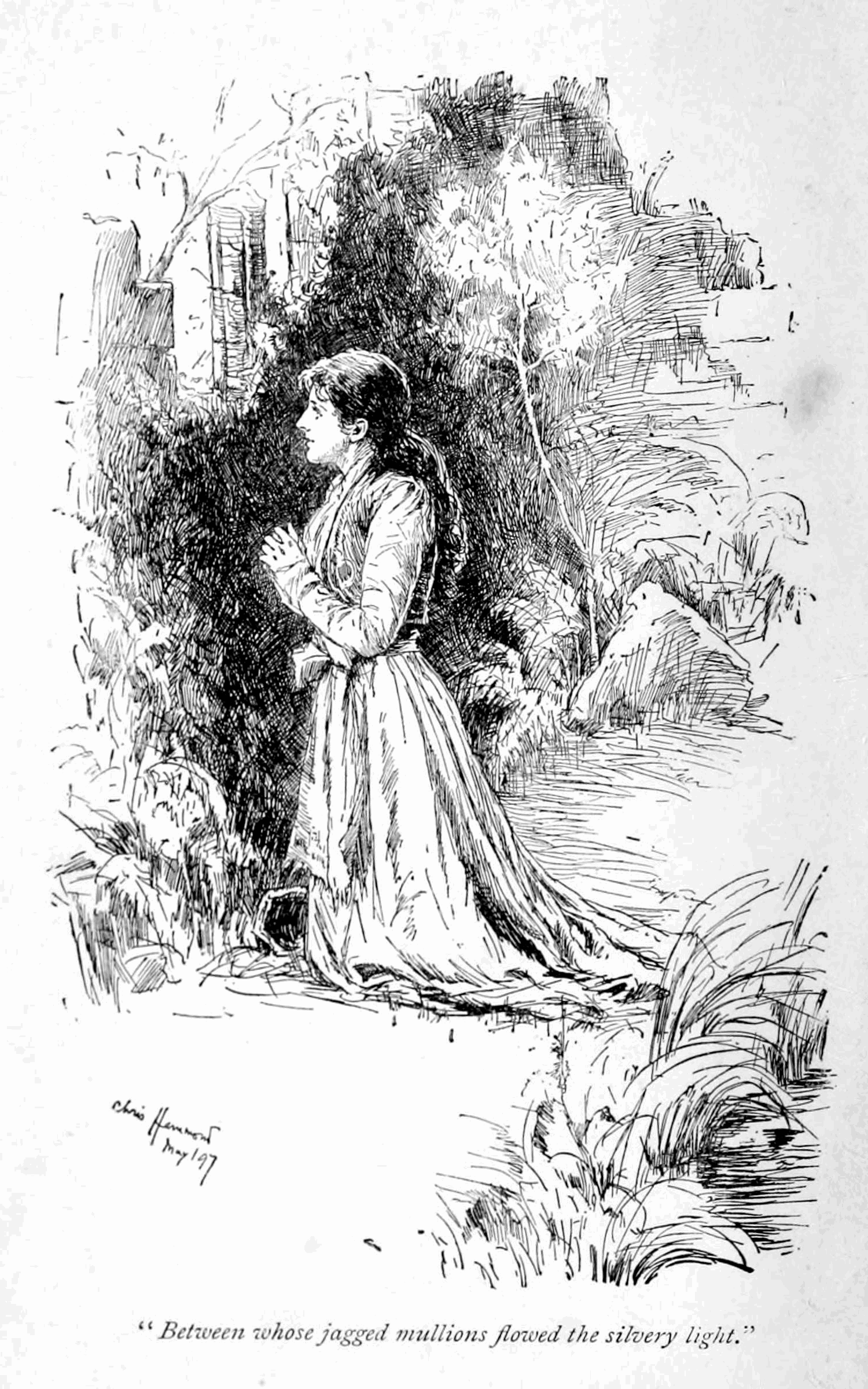
- Frontispiece to the 1897 edition
- Author: R. D. Blackmore
- Language: English
- Publication date: 1897
- Publication place: United Kingdom

Dariel: a romance of Surrey is a novel by R. D. Blackmore published in 1897. It is an adventure story set initially in Surrey before the action moves to the Caucasian mountains. The story is narrated by George Cranleigh, a farmer who falls in love with Dariel, the daughter of a Caucasian prince. Dariel was the last of Blackmore's novels, published just over two years before his death.

== Plot ==
The story is narrated by George Cranleigh, a younger son of Lord Harold Cranleigh, a destitute landowner in Surrey, who has been ruined, according to Blackmore, by the "farce of Free-trade".

In the opening chapter George, riding home from market, surprises a maiden of surpassing beauty upon her knees in a ruined chapel. She proves to be Dariel, the daughter of Sur Imar, a prince of the Lesghians, a wild tribe of the Caucasus. A blood feud has arisen between Imar and his sister, and so he has, with his daughter, his foster-brother Stepan, and a body of retainers, come to England and settled peaceably in a deserted house in Surrey.

Imar resolves to returns to his native land to educate his tribesmen in the lessons of civilisation. George, who has fallen in love with Dariel, follows her to the East. But Imar's twin-sister Marva, Queen of the Ossets, who is appropriately called by the natives "the Bride of the Devil", plans to kill Prince Imar and wed his daughter Dariel to her son. After weeks of travelling and days full of desperate adventure, George, with the help of miners and Lesghians, rescues Dariel and her father and kills the wicked Princess and her fiendish son.

== Publication ==
Dariel was first serialised in Blackwood's Magazine from October 1896 to October 1897, and then published in one volume in 1897. It was the only one of his novels which was first published as one volume. It was published once more in 1900. The novel included 14 illustrations by Miss Chris Hammond.

== Reception ==
Dariel received mixed reviews. The Spectator complained that "Mr. Blackmore's method is too leisurely, and his canvas is crowded with characters who, though very engaging in themselves, retard the march of the story", and similarly The Athenaeum said that "the length is quite disproportionate either to the number of characters introduced or the complication of the history". The Publisher, on the other hand, loved the novel, stating that "the book is unquestionably the most important contribution made to fiction this year ... the love element is singularly fresh and delightful, ... the characters are alive in every fibre, and there are scores of those wonderful descriptions of nature in which Mr. Blackmore has no existing peer save Mr. Hardy or Mr. Meredith".
