= George Barnett Smith =

English author and journalist

George Barnett Smith (17 May 1841 – 2 January 1909) was an English author and journalist.

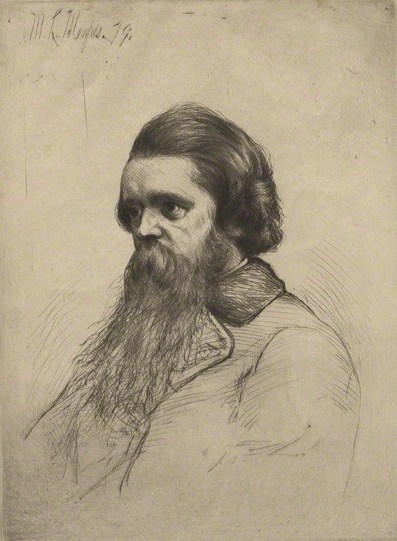
George Barnett Smith, 1879 engraving by Mortimer Luddington Menpes

== Life ==
Born at Ovenden, Yorkshire, on 17 May 1841, George Barnett Smith was the son of Titus and Mary Smith. He was educated at the British Lancastrian school in Halifax, then travelled to London where he worked as a journalist.

From 1865 to 1868 Smith was on the editorial staff of The Globe, and from 1868 to 1876 on that of The Echo. He was subsequently a contributor to The Times. With literary tastes and poetical ambition, Smith managed to become a contributor to the major magazines, among them the Edinburgh Review, the Fortnightly Review, and the Cornhill Magazine.

In 1889 lung trouble forced Smith to leave London for Bournemouth, and for the rest of his life he was an invalid. A Conservative government granted him a civil list pension in 1891, and a Liberal government increased it in 1906. Writing to the last, he died at Bournemouth on 2 January 1909, and was buried in the cemetery there.

== Works ==
Smith made a reputation as author with a series of biographies, the first of which dealt with Percy Bysshe Shelley (1877). A strong liberal in politics, he was more successful in his Life of W. E. Gladstone (1879; 14th edit. 1898), and in his Life and Speeches of John Bright (1881). There followed popular lives of Victor Hugo (1885), Queen Victoria (1886; new edit. 1901), and the German Emperor William I (1887). His most ambitious publication, History of the English Parliament (2 vols. 1892), occupied him five years. Among his other works were:

- Poets and Novelists, 1875.
- English Political Leaders, 1881.
- John Knox and the Scottish Reformation, 1889. [London. S.W. Partridge & Co.]
- Women of Renown, 1893.
- Noble Womanhood, 1894.
- The United States, 1897.
- Canada, 1898.
- Heroes of the Nineteenth Century, 3 vols. 1899–1901.
- The Romance of the South Pole, 1900.

Smith published under the pseudonym of Guy Roslyn three volumes of verse and George Eliot in Derbyshire (1876). He was a contributor to the early volumes of the Dictionary of National Biography, and his article on Elizabeth Barrett Browning in the ninth edition of the Encyclopædia Britannica (1876) earned him the friendship of Robert Browning. Some of Smith's work were included in English Etchings (1884–87).

== Family ==
Smith was twice married: (1) to Annie Hodson (died 1868); (2) in 1871, to Julia Timmis, who survived him. He had four daughters, of whom two survived him.

== Notes ==
Attribution

This article incorporates text from a publication now in the public domain: Lee, Sidney, ed. (1912). "Smith, George Barnett". Dictionary of National Biography (2nd supplement). Vol. 3. London: Smith, Elder & Co.
