= Louis Bruyas =

French actor and playwright

Louis Bruyas (24 April 1738 in Lyon – 14 June 1807 in Friedland, now known as Pravdinsk, near Kaliningrad, Russia), stage and pen-name Bursay, was a French actor and playwright. He was a member of the prestigious Académie des Arcades de Rome.

== Life ==
He debuted at the Comédie-Française on 16 February 1761, in the role of Zamore in Voltaire's Alzire. The Mercure de France for March wrote "This new débutant is an agreeable figure, and of an advantageous size. The organ of his voice is naturally beautiful. He shows much fire." Reading this, he left the Théâtre-Français shortly afterwards to enter the company of Mademoiselle Montansier, holder of the theatre concession for Brittany and Normandy. Bursay thus spent 8 years as a theatre director, playing with the company in Amiens, Rouen and Nantes.

In 1768, he reached Vienna where he met and became friends with Noverre. On Bruyas's return to Paris the following year, he débuted for a second time at the Comédie-Française on 15 January 1769, in La Métromanie by Alexis Piron and in L'Époux par supercherie by Louis de Boissy. After another stay in Vienna in 1772, he acted at La Rochelle before being taken on by Brussels's Théâtre de la Monnaie for the 1773-1774 season.

He then went to Marseille, where he acted from 1775 to 1780 (with the exception of the 1778-1779 season, which he spent in Brussels), and there had printed several of his translations from Kotzebue. On 1 October 1776 he married Marie-Anne Moylin, daughter of two actors, in Marseille. Taken on again in Brussels in 1781, he stayed there until 1793, making more translations of Kotzebue than his own plays, in which he played the lead rôles.

His daughter-in-law, Aurore Domergue, a singer at the Opéra de Paris under the stage-name Mlle Aurore, had several of his plays and translations put on in Hamburg, Saint Petersburg and Moscow under the name Mme Bursay.

== Works and translations ==
- Artaxerce, after Pietro Metastasio (Marseille, 1765, printed in Paris in 1765 and in Marseille in 1776)
- Orphée (Marseille, 1775)
- La Fête des Tigres (Marseille, 1779; Paris, 1782)
- L'Ami de Cour (Marseille, 1775, 1779 et 1780)
- Momus fabuliste ou le Mariage de Vénus et de Vulcain, a comedy "returned to the theatre with several alterations" (Marseille, 1776)
- Les Indiens en Angleterre (Brussels, 14 May 1792)
- Les Lois et les rois, ou le Bonheur des peuples (Brussels, 15 April 1793)
- Le Perroquet ou la Récompense de l'amour filial (Brussels, 9 October 1793, non imprimé)
- L'Enseigne, ou le Jeune Militaire (Brussels, 29 August 1792, imprimé en 1799)
- Misanthropie et repentir (Brussels, 3 May 1793, imprimé à Paris en 1799)
