= Jemima von Tautphoeus =

Irish author (1807–1893)

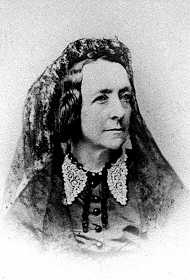
- Born: Jemima Montgomery; 23 October 1807; Seaview, County Donegal, Ireland
- Died: 12 November 1893 (aged 86)
- Occupation: Novelist
- Spouse(s): Cajetan Josef Friedrich, Baron von Tautphœus (m. 1838)
- Relatives: Maria Edgeworth (cousin)

Baroness Jemima von Tautphoeus (née Montgomery) (23 October 1807 – 12 November 1893) was an Irish novelist writing in English. She spent much of her life in Germany and wrote several stories that deal with Bavarian life, manners and history.

== Life ==
Born Jemima Montgomery on 23 October 1807 at Seaview, County Donegal, Ireland, she was the daughter of James Montgomery of Seaview and his wife, Jemima (daughter of James Glasgow of Aughadenvarn, County Leitrim). She was also the niece of Sir Henry Conyngham Montgomery, first baronet. The writer Maria Edgeworth was a cousin, whom she described as one of the most interesting people it was possible to know.

Jemima was married on 29 January 1838 to Cajetan Josef Friedrich, Baron von Tautphœus of Marquartstein (1805–1885), Chamberlain to the king of Bavaria. The remainder of her life was spent principally in Bavaria, where she was equally at home in court circles, and as her works show, among the peasantry and the middle classes.

Baron von Tautphœus died on 14 November 1885, a few days after his only son, Rudolf Edgeworth Josef (20 November 1838 – 1 November 1885), who had risen to be Bavarian minister in Rome. The Baroness died on 12 November 1893.

== Career ==
Baroness von Tautphoeus is a member of a group of writers of English fiction, who became residents in foreign countries and devoted their talents to the illustration of foreign manners. Having been extremely popular in the second half of the 19th century, they have since fallen into obscurity.

Her four novels were described by Richard Garnett as "entertaining combinations of romance and travelogue," drawing on a knowledge of English and German manners and scenery. Her heroines (such as Hildegarde in The Initials and Leonora in Quits) are forceful and intellectually curious. Her first, The Initials (London, 1850) became highly popular despite attracting little critical attention. It contrasts a pair of German sisters and is a tale of skilful suspense with a happy dénouement. Quits (London, 1857; in German, Leipzig, 1863) concerns how the life of the mind may protect someone from frivolous society. It devotes 60 pages in three chapters to the Oberammergau Passion Play performance of 1850. Cyrilla (1853 in German, Leipzig, 1854) is founded on the true-life murder trial of Assessor Zahn. The last novel, At Odds (1863), suffered in the author's view from being written in a period of prolonged ill-health.

A more recent account of Baroness von Tautphoeus states that her novels point to a person of conservative tastes, very well read in English, German and French. She was mistrustful of the modernity of the 19th century and tended to see Bavaria as a refuge for traditional values in a fast-changing world. Her silence in the 33 years that followed her last novel probably reflects a lack of sympathy with events in Bavaria in the latter half of that century. As her obituarist in The New York Times put it, "She always lived a retired life, and had published nothing for many years, and her death seems not to have been regarded in Germany as a matter of news."
