= R. D. Blackmore =

English novelist (1825-1900)

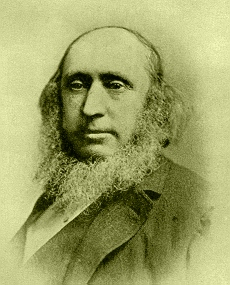
- Born: Richard Doddridge Blackmore; 7 June 1825; Longworth, Berkshire (now Oxfordshire), England
- Died: 20 January 1900 (aged 74); Teddington, Middlesex, England
- Occupations: novelist, horticulturist
- Writing career
- Notable work: Lorna Doone
- Movement: Romantic

Richard Doddridge Blackmore (7 June 1825 – 20 January 1900) was one of the most famous English novelists of the second half of the nineteenth century. He won acclaim for vivid descriptions and personification of the countryside, sharing with Thomas Hardy a Western England background and a strong sense of regional setting in his works.

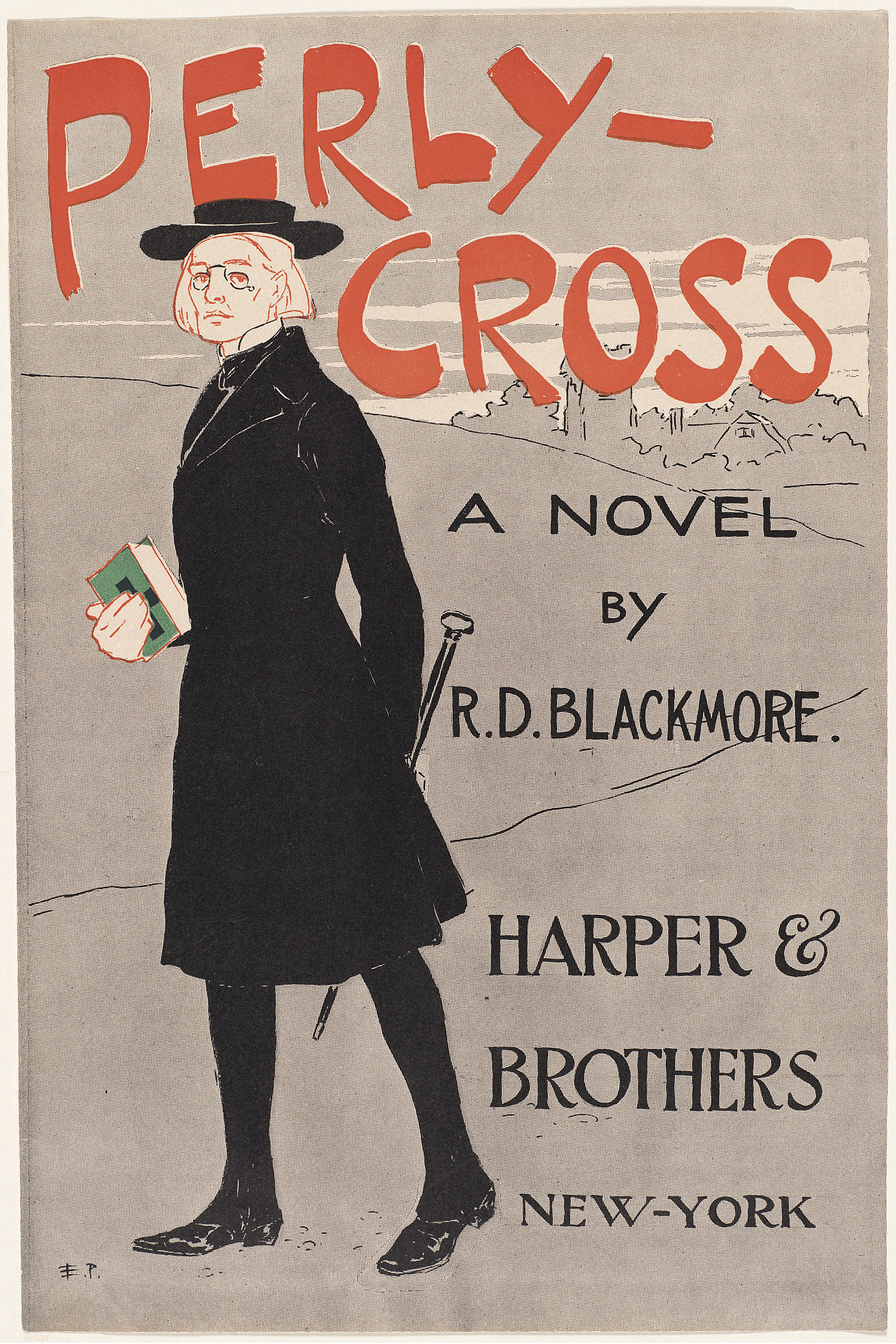
Perly-Cross, a novel by R. D. Blackmore poster ad

Blackmore, often referred to as the "Last Victorian", was a pioneer of the movement in fiction that continued with Robert Louis Stevenson and others. He has been described as "proud, shy, reticent, strong-willed, sweet-tempered, and self-centred." Apart from his novel Lorna Doone, which has enjoyed continuing popularity, his work has gone out of print.

In the 1881 National Census of England and Wales he is recorded as residing in Teddington, Middlesex, occupation Barrister.

== Biography ==
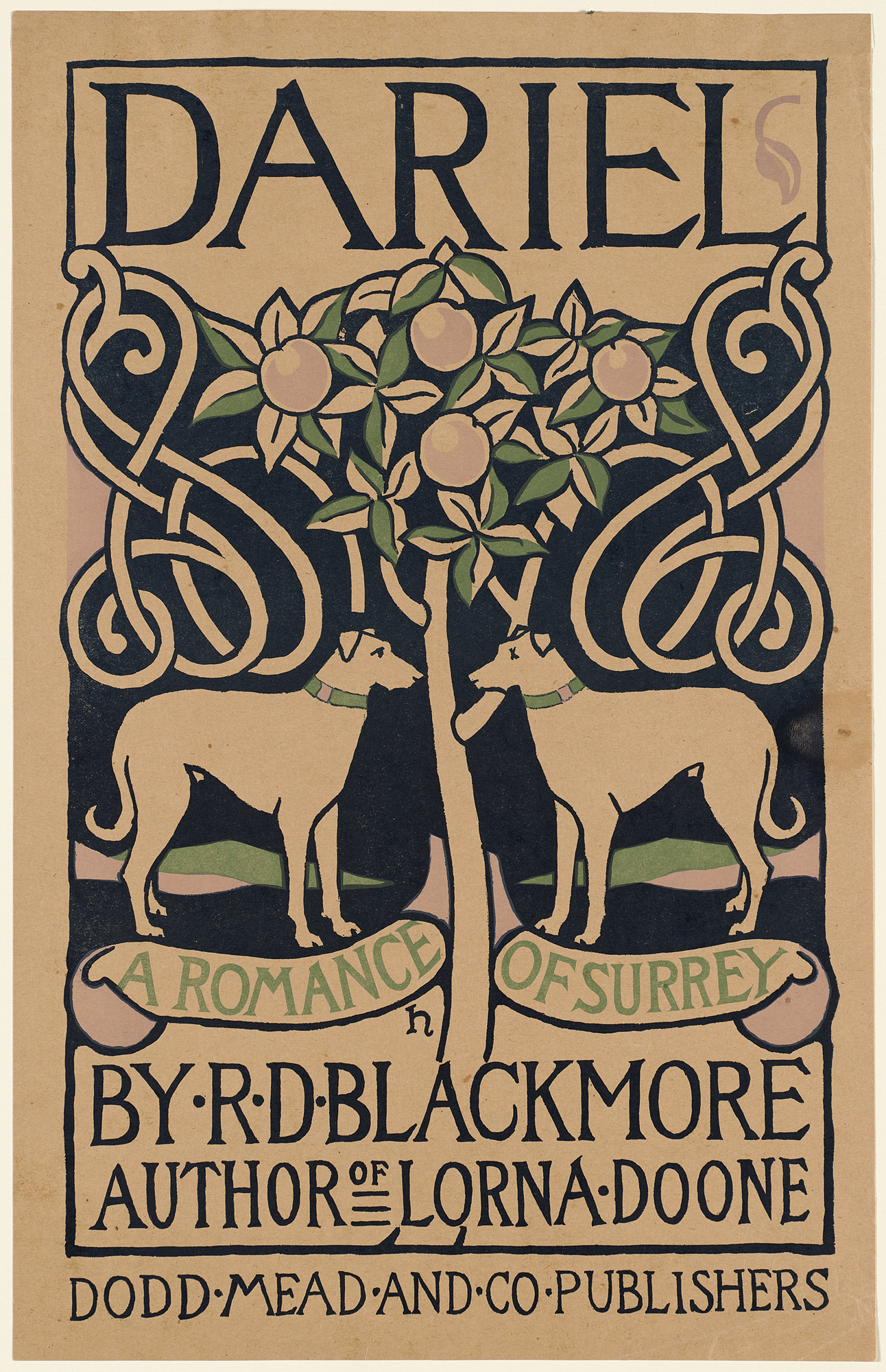
Dariel, a romance of Surrey, by R. D. Blackmore poster art

Richard Doddridge Blackmore was born on 7 June 1825 at Longworth in Berkshire (now Oxfordshire), one year after his elder brother Henry (1824–1875), where his father, John Blackmore, was curate-in-charge of the parish. His mother died a few months after his birth—the victim of an outbreak of typhus which had occurred in the village. After this loss John Blackmore moved to Bushey, Herts, then to his native Devon, first to Kings Nympton, then Culmstock, Tor Mohun and later to Ashford, in the same county. Richard, however, was taken by his aunt, Mary Frances Knight, and after her marriage to the Rev. Richard Gordon, moved with her to Elsfield rectory, near Oxford. His father married again in 1831, whereupon Richard returned to live with him. Having spent much of his childhood in the lush and pastoral "Doone Country" of Exmoor, and along the Badgworthy Water (where there is now a memorial stone in Blackmore's honour), Blackmore came to love the very countryside he immortalised in Lorna Doone.

=== Scholarly career ===
In 1837, Blackmore entered Blundell's School in Tiverton. He excelled in classical studies, and later won a scholarship to Exeter College, Oxford, where he took his degree in 1847. During a university vacation he made his first attempt at writing a novel. This was the beginning of The Maid of Sker—not, in fact, completed until many years later, and eventually published in 1872—which he himself would come to consider his finest novel.

After leaving Oxford and spending some time as a private tutor, Blackmore decided on a career in law. He entered the Middle Temple in 1849 and was called to the Bar in 1852. Ill-health, however, prevented him from continuing legal work as a full-time occupation and in 1854, he took the post of classics master at Wellesley House Grammar School, Hampton Road, Twickenham. In later years this became the Metropolitan and City of London Police Orphanage and then Fortescue House School. Soon after accepting this position, he moved from London to No. 25 Lower Teddington Road, Hampton Wick—where he lived until he moved to his new home in Teddington.

=== Marriage ===
Blackmore was married on 8 November 1853 at Trinity Church, Holborn, to Lucy Maguire. She was 26, a Roman Catholic and said to be somewhat delicate; they never had any children. They were both fond of her sister Agnes' four children and often had them to stay. As well as helping with their education, the Blackmores seem to have adopted Eva when she was 7. Theirs was described by Blackmore's sister as a "happy marriage."

=== Move to the country ===
In September 1857, Blackmore's uncle, the Rev. H.H. Knight, Rector of Neath, Glamorgan, died and left his nephew a sum of money which enabled him to realise a long-held ambition of possessing a house in the country encompassed by a large garden. Blackmore's father encouraged him in the scheme and helped him to carry it into effect.

==== Fruit-growing business ====
The land selected was a 16-acre (65,000 m^{2}) plot at Teddington which Blackmore had seen and admired for some time. Here he built his new house—completed in 1860—in which he lived for the rest of his life. He called it Gomer House after one of his favourite dogs, a Gordon Spaniel. In the extensive grounds he created an 11-acre (45,000 m^{2}) market garden specialising in the cultivation of fruit. The grounds were surrounded by high walls which served to keep out thieves and to aid the ripening of tender fruit. His knowledge of horticulture was extensive, but through competition and other factors, the business was not a very lucrative enterprise except in his supply of pears to Covent Garden. However, he is believed to have held the view that he preferred to be remembered as the winner of first prize for swedes than as the author of Lorna Doone.

==== Fight for environment ====
At the time Blackmore came to Teddington, the railway had not yet disturbed its quiet rural atmosphere. Before long, however, plans were in hand for the purchase of land and the construction of lines. In 1868, Blackmore won a fight against the claims made on his property by the London and South Western Railway Company, but he was unable to prevent the building of the railway station almost directly opposite his house.

=== His works, his reputation, and death ===
Blackmore began a career as writer by publishing collections of poetry, before turning to novel-writing. His third novel, which became his best known and most successful, Lorna Doone (1869), established him in the front rank of British novelists of that time. With it, he pioneered a new romantic movement in English fiction. The novel's overwhelming popularity was only secured when it appeared as a one-volume edition, as distinct from the unsuccessful three-volume form in which it was originally published. However, Blackmore was of the view that it had become popular quite by accident when a book reviewer had incorrectly stated that the book was about the forefathers of Lord Lorne who had recently married Princess Louise. Hardy would write to Blackmore expressing his appreciation of the book; but the two men were divided by a certain rivalry as well as differences in temperament and opinions. Various attempts were made to dramatise Lorna Doone, but Blackmore only authorised one and that was from the pen of Horace Newte.

Blackmore followed Sir Walter Scott in often setting his characters against a significant historical background, as with Springhaven (1887) and the Napoleonic Wars; his descriptive powers perhaps exceeded his narrative structures.

Some local residents in Teddington regarded Blackmore as somewhat unsociable, if not misanthropic. Charles Deayton, a Teddington merchant, is recorded as stating to a visitor—

"He is not a social man, and seems wedded to his garden in summer and his book writing in winter. That is all I know about him; except that he keeps the most vicious dogs to protect his fruit, and I would advise you to avoid the risk [of visiting him]."

This statement gives a rather distorted picture of Blackmore's character. Although he was of a retiring disposition, preoccupied with the demands of writing and fruit growing, he did, in fact, have a number of very intimate friends whom he met regularly. His works had a wide following in the United States and during his life he formed many friendships with Americans.

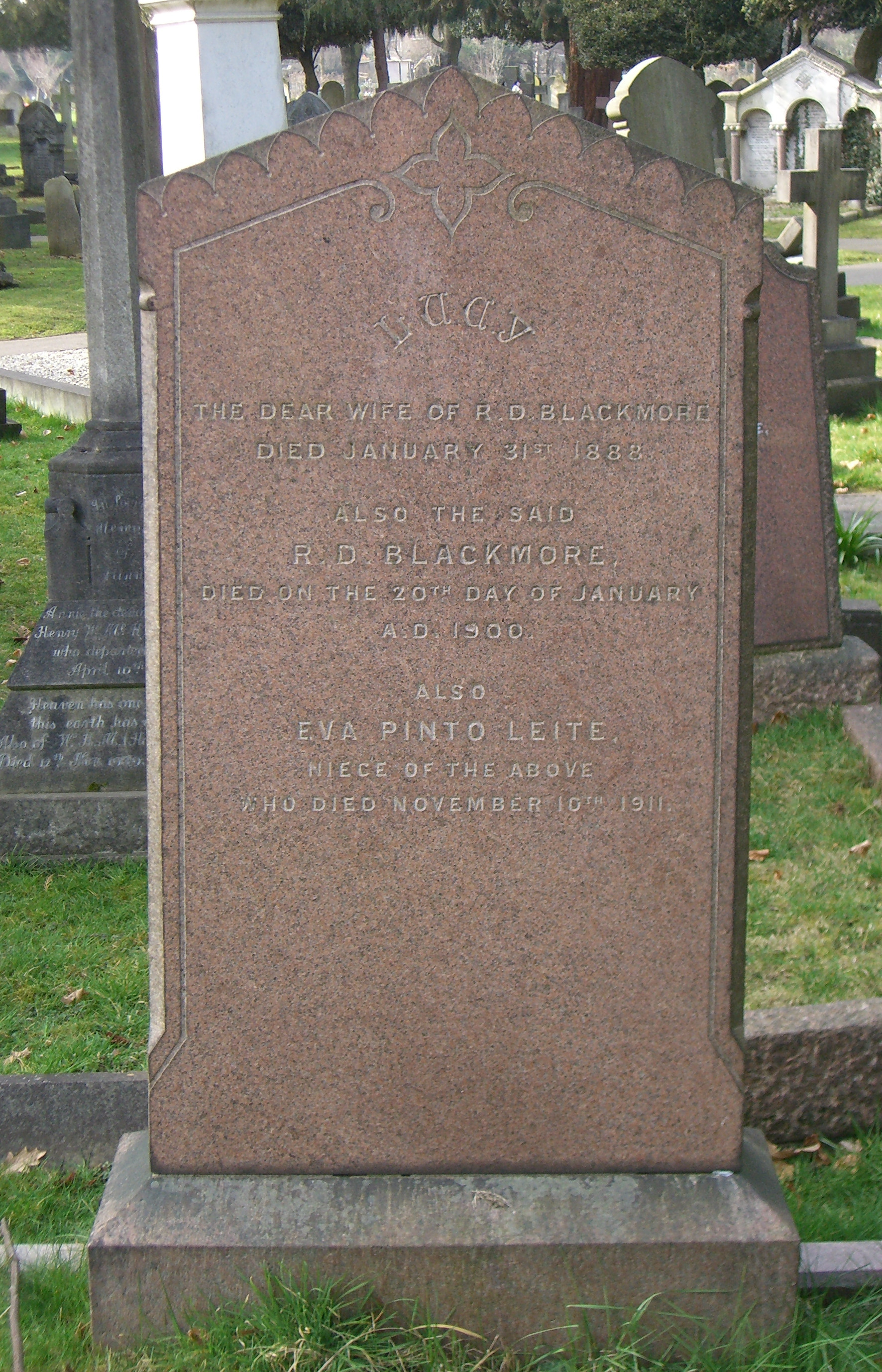
Blackmore family grave in Teddington Cemetery

His wife's health began to deteriorate and became critical by the beginning of January 1888, and she died at the end of that month. The funeral was held on 3 February 1888 in Teddington Parish Church, and she was buried in Teddington Cemetery. After her death, Blackmore was looked after by her nieces, Eva and Adalgisa Pinto-Leite. Blackmore died at Teddington on 20 January 1900 after a long and painful illness, and at his request was buried next to his wife. His final letter was to his sister Ellen, who likewise was suffering a terminal illness. Blackmore movingly ended his short Christmas letter of 1899 as follows:

"I have fallen away during the last month, having taken obstinate chills, & caring neither to eat nor drink, nor speak. All my energy & spirit are abated, & often I know not where I am. – E. & D. join me in kindest love, & I am always"

"PS Frost coming, I fear – don't like the look of it[.]"

Upon his death at the age of 74, a well-attended funeral in Teddington Cemetery, conducted by his old friend, the Reverend Robert Borland, was held in his honour. Four years after his death, in April 1904, a memorial to him was established in Exeter Cathedral. The result of work by a committee including his good friend, Thomas Hardy, Rudyard Kipling, and James Barrie, it bore an address written by another writer from Devon, Eden Phillpotts, and the portrait was carved by Harry Hems of Exeter. A reduced copy of the memorial was also mounted in Oare Church in Somerset, where Lorna Doone was married; above it in the cathedral was a stained glass window depicting David, Jonathan, and Samson—the archetypes of courage, love, and strength, respectively. John Ridd and Lorna Doone are cast at the top of the window, not far from Carver Doone.

=== After death ===
Blackmore's two nieces continued to live in Gomer House; Amelia died in 1911 and was also buried in the Blackmore grave. Then in October 1938 there was an auction of all its contents, which included Blackmore's own library containing first editions of his works. The house itself was later demolished and Doone Close, Blackmore's Grove and Gomer Gardens were built, referencing the novelist's associations with Teddington. The end of Doone Close marks the approximate site of Gomer House. Blackmore's market garden covered the area between the present Station Road and Field Lane.

== Works ==
- Poems by Melanter (1854)
- Epullia and other poems (1854)
- The Bugle of the Black Sea (1855)
- The Fate of Franklin (1860)
- Farm and Fruit of Old: an illustration in verse of the first and second Georgics of Virgil (1862)
- Clara Vaughan: a novel (1864)
- Cradock Nowell: a tale of the New Forest (1866, revised 1873)
- Lorna Doone: a romance of Exmoor (1869, slightly revised 1883)
- The Maid of Sker (1872)
- Alice Lorraine: a tale of the South Downs (1875)
- Cripps the Carrier: a woodland tale (1876)
- Erema; or, my father's sin (1877)
- Mary Anerley: a Yorkshire tale (1880)
- Christowell: a Dartmoor tale (1882)
- Sir Thomas Upmore (1884)
- Springhaven: a tale of the Great War (1887)
- Kit and Kitty: a story of west Middlesex (1890)
- Perlycross: a tale of the western hills (1894)
- Fringilla: a tale in verse (1895)
- Tales from a Telling House, or Slain by the Doones: four short stories (1895). A collection of four short stories that includes "Slain by the Doones", "Frida, or, The Lover's Leap", "George Bowring, a Tale of Cader Idris", and "Crocker's Hole".
- Leila, the Golden Fleece (1896). A story not published in any collection which was published on 29 November and 6 December 1896 in The Daily News (Denver, Colorado, U.S.A.), and in other United States newspapers on this and later dates.
- Dariel: a romance of Surrey (1897)

== See also ==
- Victorian era
- Romantic movement
- Charles Dickens
- Robert Louis Stevenson
- Thomas Hardy
