= Anna Maria Porter =

English poet and novelist (1780–1832)

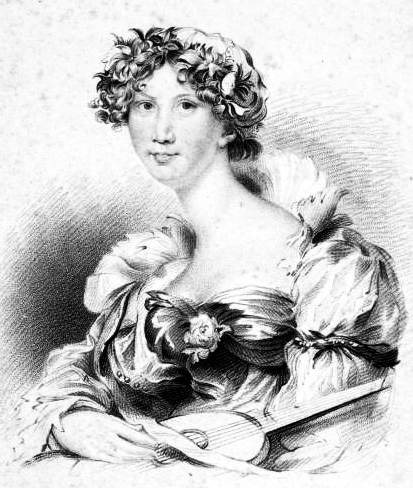
Anna Maria Porter, from an engraving for The Ladies' Pocket Magazine (1824)

Anna Maria Porter (1778–1832) was an English poet and novelist.

== Life ==
The sister of Jane Porter and Robert Ker Porter, she was probably born on 17 December 1778 and was baptized in Salisbury on 25 December 1778. She spent her infancy in Durham, England, the home town of her mother. Her father, William Porter (1735–1779), served as an army surgeon for 23 years and died before she was a year old. He is buried in St Oswald's Church, Durham. After the death of her father, her family settled in Edinburgh, where the Porter children attended charity school and enjoyed the friendship of Walter Scott.

Throughout her life, Anna Maria was known as Maria (pronounced məɾˡaiə). Maria, being fair-haired, pretty, and outgoing, was nicknamed 'L'Allegra'. At the age of 14, Maria published her first book, Artless Tales. She was in London by the 1790s, publishing verse in the Universal Magazine. After Artless Tales, she also wrote a short novel Walsh Colville published anonymously in 1797. Though her sister Jane was the more acclaimed and popular writer, Maria was the more prolific. The Hungarian Brothers (1807), a historical romance set against the French Revolutionary Wars, was a success and went into several editions.

Maria also produced the humanitarian Tales of Pity on Fishing, Shooting and Hunting in 1814, and collaborated with her sister on collections of stories. She was one of the era's most published and respected fiction writers, with many of her works translated into French, but she also published poems and short stories and had an opera produced.

Anna Maria Porter died on 21 June 1832 from a typhus fever at the house of Mrs Colonel Booth, a friend of her brother Dr William Ogilvie Porter, Montpelier, near Bristol. Maria was buried at the churchyard of St Paul in that city.

== Selected works ==
- Artless Tales vol. 1 (1793)
- Artless Tales vol. 2 (1795/6)
- Walsh Colville (1797)
- Octavia (1798)
- The Lake of Killarney (1804)
- A Sailor's Friendship, and a Soldier's Love (1805)
- The Hungarian Brothers (1807)
- Don Sebastian; or, The House of Braganza (1809)
- Ballad Romances, and Other Poems (1811)
- Tales of Pity on Fishing, Shooting, and Hunting (1814)
- The Recluse of Norway (1814)
- The Knight of St. John (1817)
- The Fast of St. Magdalen (1818)
- The Village of Mariendorpt (1821)
- Roche-Blanche; or, the Hunters of the Pyrenees (1821)
- Honor O'Hara (1826)
- Tales Round a Winter Hearth (1826; a collaboration with Jane Porter)
- Coming Out; and The Field of Forty Footsteps (1828; a collaboration with Jane Porter)
- The Barony (1830)

== Literature ==
- Devoney Looser: Sister novelists : the trailblazing Porter sisters, who paved the way for Austen and the Brontës, New York; London; Oxford; New Delhi; Sydney : Bloomsbury Publishing, 2022, ISBN 978-1-63557-529-3
