= Antoine Alexandre Barbier =

French librarian and bibliographer (1765 – 1825)

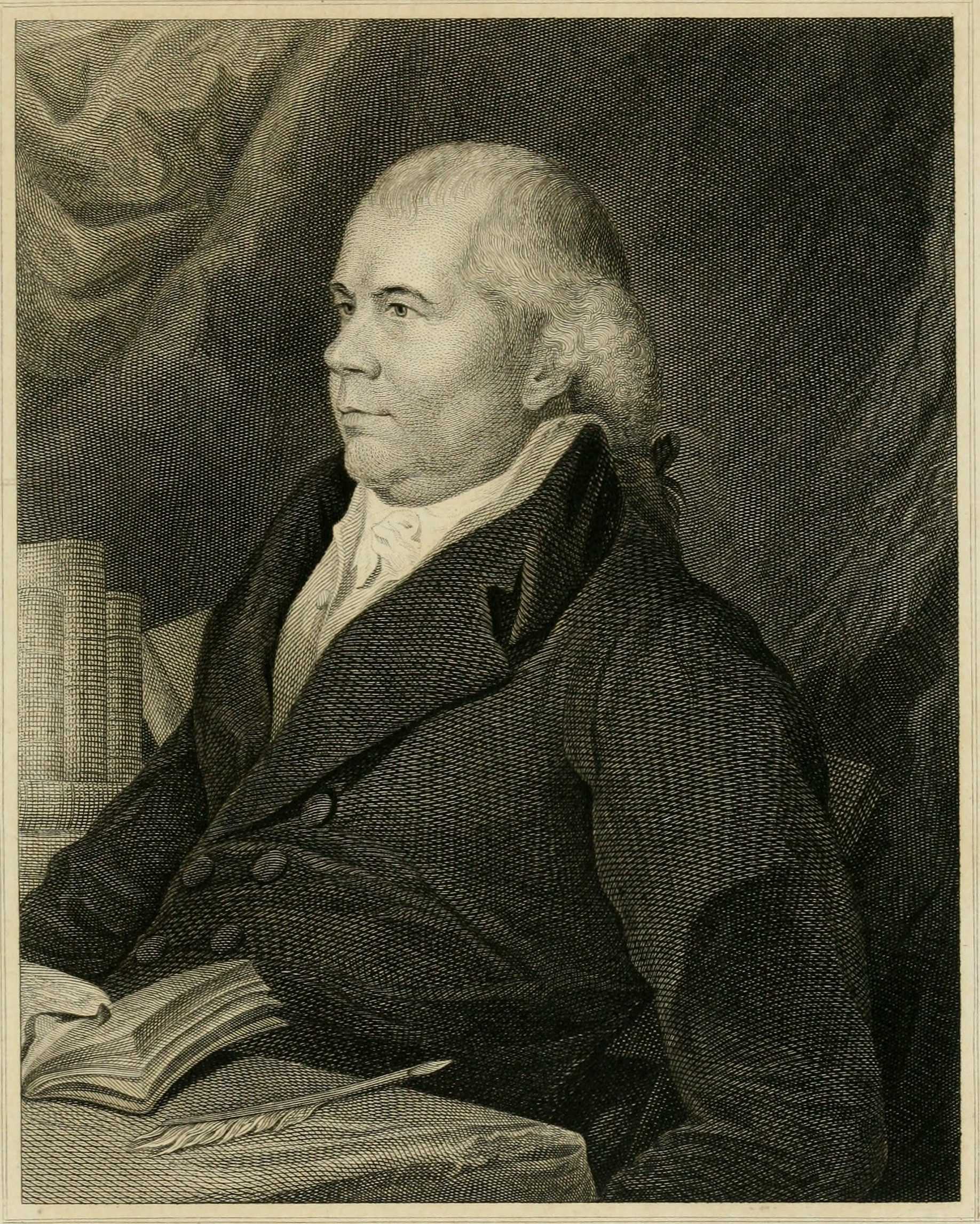

Antoine Alexandre Barbier (11 January 1765 – 5 December 1825) was a French librarian and bibliographer.

He was born in Coulommiers (Seine-et-Marne). He took priest's orders, from which, however, he was finally released by the pope in 1801. In 1794 he became a member of the temporary commission of the arts, and was charged with the duty of distributing among the various libraries of Paris the books that had been confiscated during the French Revolution. In the execution of this task he discovered the letters of Huet, bishop of Avranches, and the manuscripts of the works of Fénelon.

He became librarian successively to the French Directory, to the Conseil d'Etat, and in 1807 to Napoleon, from whom he carried out a number of commissions. He produced a standard work in his Dictionnaire des ouvrages anonymes et pseudonymes (4 vols., 1806—1809). Only the first part of his Examen critique des dictionnaires historiques (1820) was published.

He had a share in the foundation of the libraries of the Louvre, of Fontainebleau, of Compiègne and Saint-Cloud; under Louis XVIII he became administrator of the king's private libraries, but in 1822 he was deprived of all his offices. Barbier died in Paris, aged 60.
