= Lucinda (novel) =

1807 novel

Lucinda; or, The Mountain Mourner is an epistolary novel by P. D. Manvill (1764–1849), first published in 1807. A bestseller at the time, it was widely distributed and went through numerous editions.

In Lucinda, the eponymous protagonist is raped, becomes pregnant, descends into poverty, and dies shortly after giving birth. Booher classifies Lucinda as a work of sentimental fiction. In particular, following Nina Baym, she describes it as a "novel of seduction", in which the female protagonist becomes pregnant and comes to a tragic end as a result. Cathy Davidson, following Helen Papashvily, argues that Lucinda marks an end of the seduction plot in American literature—with Hester Prynne as one outlier in this regard.

Booher likens Lucinda to The Coquette (1797), noting that both works are preoccupied with the protagonist's so-called virtue, or abstinence from premarital sex.

The work is set in upstate New York, in Saratoga Springs and near Marcellus.

== Sources ==
- Anderson, Jill Kirsten (December 30, 2010). "Review of Emily Hamilton and Other Writings and Lucinda; or, The Mountain Mourner". Legacy: A Journal of American Women Writers. 27 (2): 299–302. ISSN 1534-0643.
- Booher, Mischelle (2007). ""I Trust Every Feeling Heart": Reader History and P. D. Manvill's Lucinda; Or the Mountain Mourner". Early American Literature. 42 (2): 285–303. ISSN 0012-8163. JSTOR 25057499.
