= Lorna Doone =

1869 novel by R. D. Blackmore

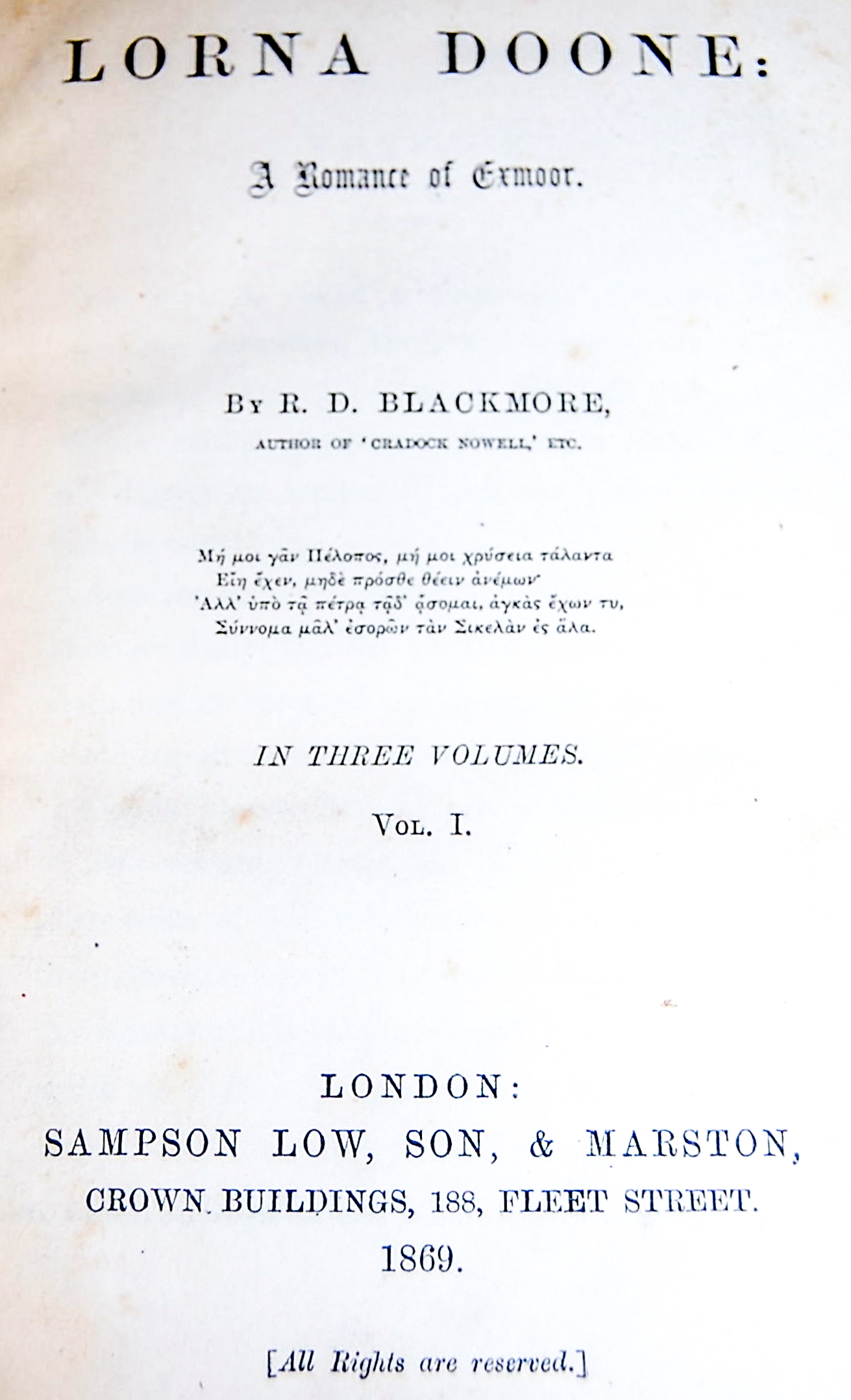
- First edition title page
- Author: R. D. Blackmore
- Language: English
- Genre: Historical fiction
- Published: 1869
- Publisher: Sampson Low, Son, & Marston
- Publication place: United Kingdom
- Media type: Print
- Text: Lorna Doone online

Lorna Doone: A Romance of Exmoor is a historical novel by R. D. Blackmore, first published in three volumes in London in 1869. It is a romance based on a group of historical characters and set in the late 17th century in Devon and Somerset, particularly around the East Lyn Valley area of Exmoor. In 2003, the novel was listed on the BBC's survey The Big Read.

== Plot ==
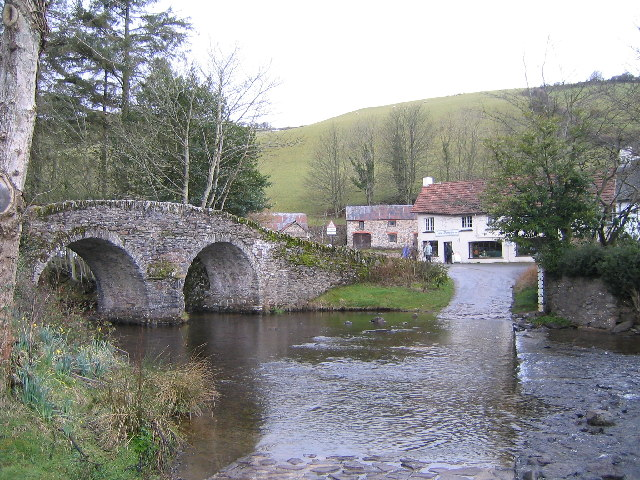
Badgworthy water, Malmsmead

John Ridd is the son of a respectable farmer in 17th-century Exmoor, a region in North Devon and Somerset, England. A notorious Doone clan, once nobles and now outlaws, murdered John's father. Battling his desire for revenge, John (in West Country English, pronounced "Jan") grows into a respectable farmer who cares well for his mother and sisters. He meets Lorna by accident and falls hopelessly in love. She turns out (apparently) to be the granddaughter of Sir Ensor, Lord of the Doones. Sir Ensor's impetuous and now jealous heir Carver will let nothing thwart his plan to marry Lorna once he comes into his inheritance.

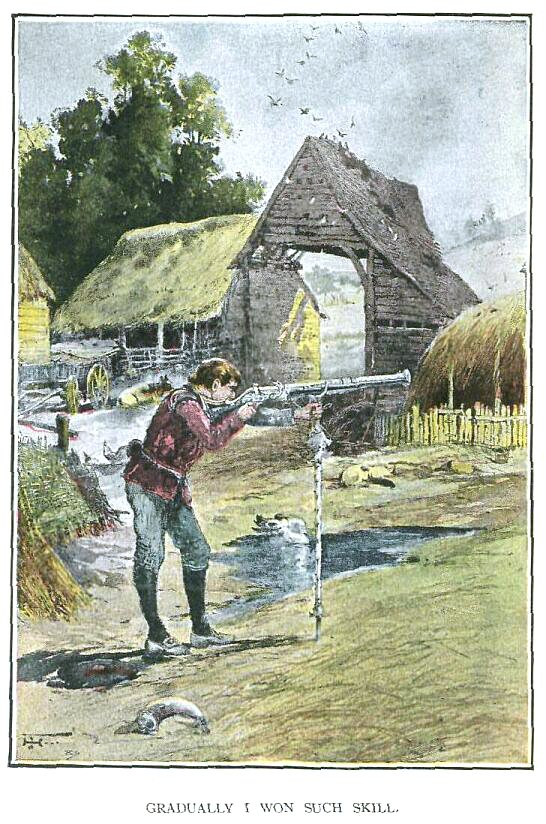
John Ridd learns to fire his father's gun – from an 1893 illustrated edition

Sir Ensor dies, and Carver becomes Lord of the Doones. John helps Lorna escape to his family's farm. Since Lorna is a Doone the Ridds have mixed feelings towards her but still defend her against Carver's retaliatory attack. During a visit from the Counsellor, Carver's father and the wisest Doone, Lorna's necklace is stolen. Sir Ensor had told Lorna the necklace was her mother's. A family friend soon discovers that the necklace belonged to a Lady Dugal, who was robbed and murdered by outlaws. Only her daughter survived.This reveals that Lorna is not a Doone after all, but heiress to a huge fortune. By law, but against her will, she must return to London as a ward in Chancery. Despite John and Lorna's love, their marriage is out of the question.

King Charles II dies, and the Duke of Monmouth, the late king's illegitimate son, challenges Charles's brother James for the throne. Hoping to reclaim their ancestral lands, the Doones abandon their plan to marry Lorna to Carver and claim her wealth, and side with Monmouth. Monmouth is defeated at the Battle of Sedgemoor, and his associates are sought for treason. Although innocent, John Ridd is captured during the rebellion. An old friend takes John to London to clear John's name. Reunited with Lorna, John thwarts an attack on her guardian, Earl Brandir. The king then pardons John and grants him a title.

The communities around Exmoor have tired of the Doones' depredations. Knowing the Doones better than any other man, John leads the attack. All the Doone men are killed except the Counsellor and Carver, who escapes vowing revenge. When Earl Brandir dies, Lorna's new guardian allows her to return to Exmoor and marry John. Carver bursts into their wedding, shoots Lorna and flees. In a blind rage, John pursues Carver. A struggle leaves Carver sinking in a mire and John so exhausted that he can only watch as Carver dies. John discovers that Lorna has survived, and after a period of anxious uncertainty they live happily ever after.

== Publication history ==
Blackmore experienced difficulty in finding a publisher, and the novel was first published anonymously in 1869, in a limited three-volume edition of just 500 copies, of which only 300 sold. The following year it was republished in an inexpensive one-volume edition and became a huge critical and financial success. It has never been out of print.

== Reception ==
The book received acclaim from Blackmore's contemporary, Margaret Oliphant, and as well from later Victorian writers including Philip James Bailey, Robert Louis Stevenson, Gerard Manley Hopkins, and Thomas Hardy. George Gissing wrote in a letter to his brother Algernon that the novel was "quite admirable, approaching Scott as closely as anything since the latter". A favourite among females, it was also popular among male readers, and was chosen by male students at Yale in 1906 as their favourite novel.

== Development of the novel ==
By his own account, Blackmore relied on a "phonologic" style for his characters' speech, emphasising their accents and word formation. He expended great effort, in all of his novels, on his characters' dialogues and dialects, striving to recount realistically not only the ways, but also the tones and accents, in which thoughts and utterances were formed by the various sorts of people who lived on Exmoor in the 17th century.

Blackmore incorporated real events and places into the novel. The Great Winter described in chapters 41–45 was a real event. He himself attended Blundell's School in Tiverton which serves as the setting for the opening chapters. One of the inspirations behind the plot is said to be the shooting of Mary Whiddon on her wedding day at the parish church of Chagford, Devon, in the 17th century. Unlike the heroine of the novel, she did not survive, but is commemorated in the church. Apparently, Blackmore invented the name "Lorna", possibly drawing on a Scottish source.

According to the preface, the work is a romance and not a historical novel, because the author neither "dares, nor desires, to claim for it the dignity or cumber it with the difficulty of an historical novel." As such, it combines elements of traditional romance, of Sir Walter Scott's historical novel tradition, of the pastoral tradition, of traditional Victorian values, and of the contemporary sensation novel trend. Along with the historical aspects are folk traditions, such as the many legends based around both the Doones and Tom Faggus. The composer Puccini once considered using the story as the plot for an opera, but abandoned the idea.

== Other versions and cultural references ==
- Lorna Doone is also a shortbread cookie made by Mondelez.
- Title character Lorna Doone, a B-movie actress in a Tom Tryon novella, was christened in honour of Blackmore's character.
- Lorna Doone was said to be the favourite book of Australian bushranger and outlaw Ned Kelly, who may have thought of the idea of his armour by reading of the outlaw Doones "with iron plates on breast and head".
- Lorna Doone is a character portrayed by Christine McIntyre in The Three Stooges shorts The Hot Scots and Scotched in Scotland.
- The book inspired the song "Pangs of Lorna" by Kraus.
- Atholl Oakeley, British wrestling promoter, was fascinated by the book, and billed Exmoor-born wrestler Jack Baltus as Carver Doone in the 1930s.
- Cartoonist H. M. Brock produced a comic book adaptation of Lorna Doone for the British girls' comic Princess (1960).
- Lorna Doone is the final track of Mystery Jets' 2010 album Serotonin (album).
