= Three-volume novel =

Form of publishing a novel/series in 3 volumes

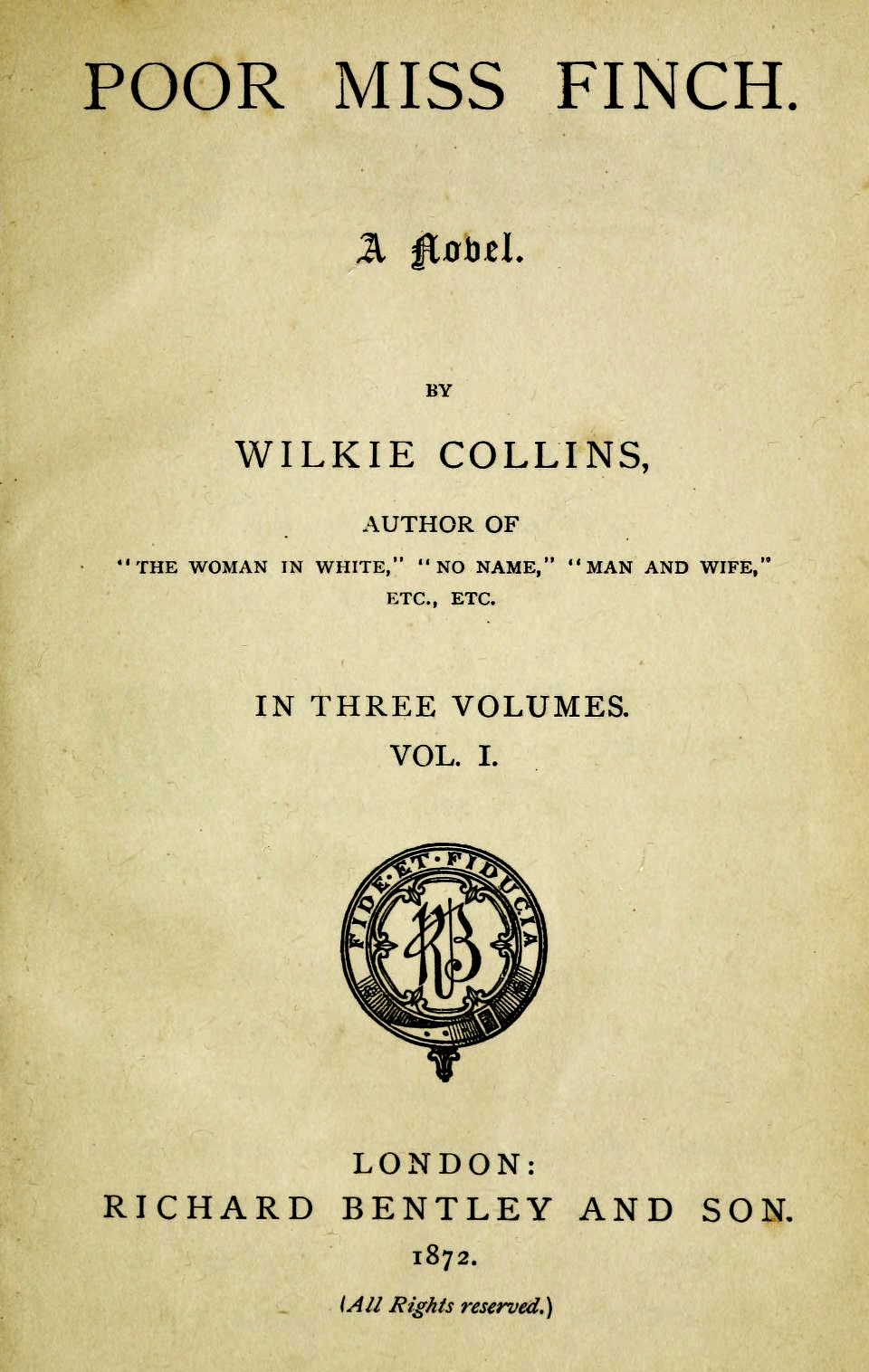
The title page of the first volume of the three-volume, first edition of Poor Miss Finch by Wilkie Collins (1872)

The three-volume novel (sometimes three-decker or triple decker (Note: The term three-decker was also used for the largest and most-expensive type of sailing warship, which carried guns on three decks. Applied to three-volume novels, it may refer to the number of volumes and also be a reference to the book's size.)) was a standard form of publishing for British fiction during the nineteenth century. It was a significant stage in the development of the modern novel as a form of popular literature in Western culture.

== History ==
While multi-volume novels were published in the 18th century, three-volume editions began to become the norm with books produced by the Edinburgh-based publisher Archibald Constable in the early 19th century. Constable was one of the most significant publishers of the 1820s and made a success of publishing expensive, three-volume editions of the works of Walter Scott; the first was Scott's historical novel Kenilworth, published in 1821, at what became the standard price for the next seventy years. (Note: Archibald Constable published Ivanhoe in 3 volumes in 1820, but also, T. Egerton had been publishing the works of Jane Austen in 3 volumes 10 years earlier, Sense and Sensibility in 1811, etc.)

This continued until Constable's company collapsed in 1826 with large debts, bankrupting both him and Scott. As Constable's company collapsed, the publisher Henry Colburn quickly adopted the format. The number of three-volume novels he issued annually rose from six in 1825 to 30 in 1828 and 39 in 1829. Under Colburn's influence, the published novels adopted a standard format of three volumes in octavo, (Note: The smaller size of duodecimo had been common earlier, and this was the size used for Rob Roy for example.) priced at one-and-a-half guineas (£1 11s. 6d.) or ten shillings and sixpence (half a guinea) a volume. (Note: This was the book-store price. The circulating libraries, who purchased the majority of the editions, paid only fifteen shillings for a three-volume set, and paid for only twelve of every thirteen volumes supplied.) The price and format remained unaltered for nearly 70 years, until 1894. The price for a three-volume novel put them outside the purchase power of all but the richest households. This price should be compared with the typical six shilling price for a one-volume novel, which was also the price for the three-volume novels when they were reprinted as single volume editions.

Three-volume novels quickly disappeared after 1894, when both Mudie's and W. H. Smith stopped purchasing them at the previous price. Mudie's and Smith's issued circulars in 1894 announcing that in future they would only pay four shillings per volume for novels issued in sets, (Note: The previous price for libraries was notionally five shillings and actually 4s. 7¼d. per volume once the traditional trade discount of 13 volume for the price of 12 is allowed for. They now proposed to pay only 3s. 8¼d. per volume.) less the customary discounts, with the usual trade practice of supplying thirteen volumes for the price of twelve. This killed the production of the three-volume library editions.

Three-volume novels by year (Note: Griest notes that while Shaylor does not name his sources, he, as the director of a publisher, was in a good position to know and record how many such volumes were published, and no one disputed his summary when it was originally published.)
Year	No of Novels	Notes
1884	193	
1885	193	
1886	184	
1887	184	
1888	165	
1889	169	
1890	160	
1891	162	
1892	156	
1893	168	
1894	184	(Note: in 1894, the main circulating libraries announced that they would only pay four shillings per volume for novels issued in sets, less the customary discounts, instead of five shillings as they had previously paid.)
1895	52	
1896	25	
1897	4	

== Description ==
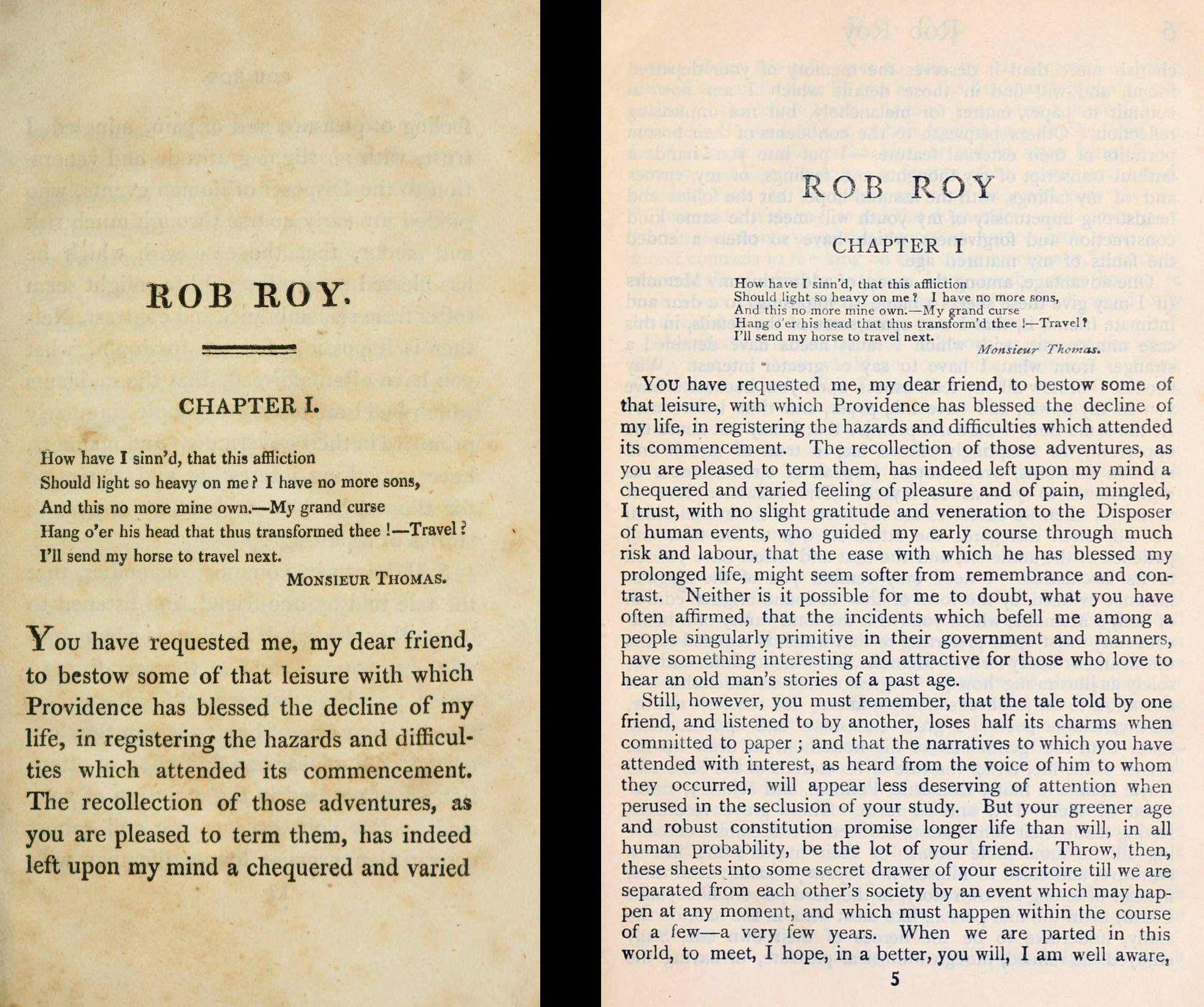
The first page of chapter one from the 3rd (three-volume) edition of 1818 of Rob Roy, compared with the same page of the single-volume 1906 Everyman's Library Edition. (Note: In comparing the first page of Chapter 1 of the first volume of the 3rd edition of 1818 and the same page of the 1906 single-volume Everyman's Library edition it should be borne in mind that the 1818 edition was in duodecimo format rather than the 1906 edition's octavo format. However, most of the three-volume novels of the eighteen century were in slightly larger octavo format. The 1818 edition had four pages of a preface and 947 pages of main text across all three volumes (excluding title pages etc). The 1906 edition printed the same preface in two pages and the text in 378 pages, and had additionally, an editor's introduction of three pages, 60 pages of Scott's 1829 introduction with appendices, three pages of a postscript to the appendices to the introduction, a one page note on Fairy Superstition (in smaller type than the rest of the text), and a four pages glossary of the terms used.)

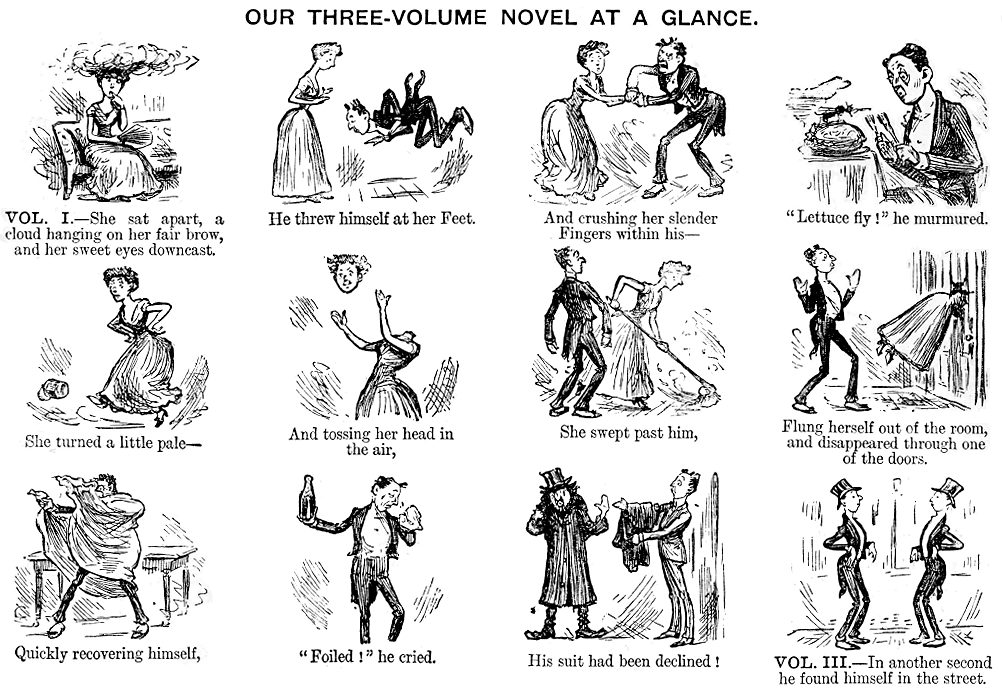
An 1885 cartoon from the magazine Punch, mocking the clichéd language attributed to three-volume novels

The format of the three-volume novel does not correspond closely to what would now be considered a trilogy of novels. In a time when books were relatively expensive to print and bind, publishing longer works of fiction had a particular relationship to a reading public who borrowed books from commercial circulating libraries. A novel divided into three parts could create a demand (Part I whetting an appetite for Parts II and III). The income from Part I could also be used to pay for the printing costs of the later parts. (Note: This did not apply to the majority of the Victorian three-volume novels which were typically issued with all three volumes at one time, but earlier fiction was sometimes issued one volume at a time, as were Victorian non-fiction works.) Furthermore, a commercial librarian had three volumes earning their keep, rather than one. The particular style of mid-Victorian fiction, of a complicated plot reaching resolution by distribution of marriage partners and property in the final pages, was well adapted to the form.

In the early nineteenth century the cost of a three-volume novel was five or six shillings per volume. (Note: Until the 1830s, novels were typically issued with temporary binds in grey cardboard, ready for the purchaser to bind them in the style of their own library.) By 1821 Archibald Constable, who published Sir Walter Scott, took advantage of his popularity to increase the price of a single volume to ten shillings and sixpence (half a guinea), or a guinea and a half (31 shillings and sixpence) for all three volumes. (Note: Archibald Constable started this increase by charging seven shillings a volume for Scott's Waverley in 1814, eight shillings a volume for Rob Roy in 1818, ten shillings for each volume of Ivanhoe in 1820, and finally, ten shillings and sixpence for Kenilworth in 1821. This became the standard price for a three-volume novel until 1894. (Note: Eighteen of the twenty-eight (64%) three-volume novels in 1830 sold for this price, rising to fifty-one of the fifty-eight (88%) three-volume novels published in 1840.{r)) This price was equivalent to half the weekly income of a modest, middle-class household. This cost was enough to deter even comparatively well-off members of the public from buying them. Instead, they were borrowed from commercial circulating libraries, the most well known being owned by Charles Edward Mudie. Mudie was able to buy novels for stock for less than half the retail price – five shillings per volume. He charged his subscribers one guinea (21 shillings) a year for the right to borrow one volume at a time, or two guineas a year (£2 2s.) to borrow four volumes at a time. A subscriber who wanted to be sure of reading the whole book without waiting for another subscriber to return the next volume had to take out the higher subscription.

Their high price meant both publisher and author could make a profit on the comparatively limited sales of such expensive books – three-volume novels were typically printed in editions of under 1,000 copies, which were often pre-sold to subscription libraries before the book was even published. It was unusual for a three-volume novel to sell more than 1,000 copies. (Note: However, this was not true for popular novelists. The first printing of Sir Walter Scott's Waverley and Ivanhoe, both in three-volume format, sold 10,000 copies each.) The system encouraged publishers and authors to produce as many novels as possible, due to the almost-guaranteed, but limited, profits that would be made on each.

The normal three-volume novel was around 900 pages in total at 150–200,000 words; the average length was 168,000 words in 45 chapters. It was common for novelists to have contracts specifying a set number of pages to be filled. If they ran under, they could be made to produce extra, or break the text up into more chapters — each new chapter heading would fill a page. In 1880, the author Rhoda Broughton was offered £750 by her publisher for her two-volume novel Second Thoughts. However, he offered her £1,200 if she could add a third volume.

== Other forms of Victorian publication ==
Outside of the subscription library system's three-volume novels, the public could access literature in the form of partworks – the novel was sold in around 20 monthly parts, costing one shilling each. This was a form used for the first publications of many of the works of Charles Dickens, Anthony Trollope and William Thackeray. Many novels by authors such as Wilkie Collins and George Eliot were first published in serial form in weekly and monthly magazines that began to become popular in the middle of the 19th century. Publishers usually offered a single-volume reprint of the three-volume library edition twelve months after the original, usually for the price of six shillings for the first reprint, with lower prices for later reprints. These were typically three shillings and sixpence for the second reprint, and two shillings for a "yellowback" for railway bookstalls. Publishers like Bentley offered cheap, one-volume reprint editions of many works, with prices falling from six shillings to five shillings in 1847, and to three shillings and sixpence or two shillings and sixpence in 1849, with a one shilling "Railway Library" in 1852. The delay before reprint editions were released (Note: The circulating libraries usually made such a delay, typically twelve months, a condition for purchasing the three-volume edition, as did Mudie's 1894 circular. This delay was not only to preserve the early access to new volumes that circulating libraries offered, but also to give them a market for disposing of their old stock.) meant that those who wished to access the latest books had no choice but to borrow three-volume editions from a subscription library. (Note: This delay could be considerable. While Jane Austen's novels were published in multi-volume format in 1811 to 1818, Sense and Sensibility was issued in three-volume format in 1811, and again in 1813. Pride and Prejudice was issued in three volumes in 1813, with a second edition in the same year, and a two-volume edition in 1817.. Mansfield Park was issued in three volumes in 1814, and again in 1816. Emma (novel) was issued in three volumes in 1816, Northanger Abbey and Persuasion were issued together in a four volume edition in 1818. it was 1833 before they were again published in England, when they were published in single volume format by Richard Bentley.) The delay also enabled the circulating libraries to sell the second-books they withdrew from circulation before a cheap edition was available. Publishers sometimes waited to see how well the withdrawn books sold before deciding the size of the reprint edition, or even whether to reprint at all.

Victorian juvenile fiction was normally published in single volumes; for example, while all of G. A. Henty's juvenile fiction was issued from the start in single volume editions, his adult novels such as Dorothy's Double (Chatto and Windus, London, 1894), Rujub the Juggler (Chatto and Windus, London, 1895), and The Queen's Cup (Chatto and Windus, London, 1897) were published as three-volume sets. (Note: This meant that this novel by Henty was one of the last three-volume novels ever published, as only four were published in 1897. The publishing history of The Queen's Cup is illustrative of how things had changed. The book first appeared as a serial in newspapers in 1896. It was issued on 12 January 1897 in three volumes by Chatto and Windus at fifteen shillings for the set of three volumes. Only 350 copies were printed of the three-volume edition. Chatto and Windus ordered 1,500 copies of a single volume edition from their printers in July 1897, and this edition sold for three shillings and sixpence. The publishers had another 500 copies printed in 1898 and again in 1907. Between all editions, only 2,850 copies were printed by Chatto and Windus, and there was no colonial edition. Even though the book was well received by the critics, it was the least successful of Chatto and Windus's Henty books, possibly due to the decision to publish it in three volumes initially.) The convention that only adult fiction was published in three-volume format was so strong that when Bevis, the Story of a Boy by Richard Jefferies (Sampson Low, London) was published in 1882 in three volumes, E. V. Lucas commented in his introduction to the 1904 Duckworth edition that doing so had kept the book out of the hands of its true readers, boys.

Colonial editions, intended for sale outside the UK, were normally published as single volume editions. (Note: Stanley Unwin noted that publisher's agreements with authors sometimes gave a fixed sum, typically three pence per copy, for colonial editions, which were often no different from single volume editions for the English market.)

The cheapest works of popular fiction were sometimes referred to pejoratively as penny dreadfuls. These were popular with young, working-class men, and often had sensationalist stories featuring criminals, detectives, pirates or the supernatural.

== 20th-century ==
Though the era of the three-volume novel effectively ended in 1894, works were still on occasion printed in more than one volume in the 20th-century. Two of John Cowper Powys's novels, Wolf Solent (1929) and Owen Glendower (1940) were published in two-volume editions by Simon & Schuster in the USA.

The Lord of the Rings is a three-volume novel, rather than a trilogy, as Tolkien originally intended the work to be the first of a two-work set, the other to be The Silmarillion, but this idea was dismissed by his publisher. For economic reasons The Lord of the Rings was published in three volumes from 29 July 1954 to 20 October 1955. The three volumes were entitled The Fellowship of the Ring, The Two Towers, and The Return of the King.

The practice of publishing a longer novel in several (not necessarily three) smaller volumes is still extremely widespread in Japan. Thus it is not very remarkable that Japanese novelist Haruki Murakami has written several books in three-volume format, such as The Wind-Up Bird Chronicle and 1Q84. However, many translations of the novel, such as into English, combine the three volumes of these novels into a single book.

== References in literature ==
- Austen, Pride and Prejudice (1813), chapter 11 ("Darcy took up a book; Miss Bingley did the same;...At length, quite exhausted by the attempt to be amused with her own book, which she had only chosen because it was the second volume of his,")
- William Clark Russell, The Deceased Wife's Sister (1847), chapter 2 ("I am prepared for any absurdity or folly from girls who have once read through a modern three-volumed novel.")
- Dixon, The Story of a Modern Woman (1894) ("No. My idea was too sad—too painful, all the publishers said. It wouldn't have pleased the British public. But I have been given a commission to do a three-volume novel on the old lines—a ball in the first volume; a picnic and a parting in the second; and an elopement, which must, of course, be prevented at the last moment by the opportune death (in a hospital) of the wife, or the husband—I forget which it is to be—in the last.").
- Trollope, The Way We Live Now (1875), Chapter LXXXIX ("The length of her novel had been her first question. It must be in three volumes, and each volume must have three hundred pages.").
- Jerome, Three Men in a Boat (1889), Chapter XII ("The London Journal duke always has his "little place" at Maidenhead; and the heroine of the three-volume novel always dines there when she goes out on the spree with somebody else's husband.").
- Kipling, "The Three-Decker" (1894), Text The Three-Decker, Commentary The Three-Decker
- Wilde, The Critic as Artist (1890), ("Anybody can write a three-volume novel, it merely requires a complete ignorance of both life and literature").
- Wilde, The Importance of Being Earnest (1895), Act II ("I believe that Memory is responsible for nearly all the three-volume novels that Mudie sends us." "Do not speak slightingly of the three-volume novel, Cecily.") and Act III ("It contained the manuscript of a three-volume novel of more than usually revolting sentimentality.").

== See also ==
- Victorian literature
- Word count
- Novel sequence

== Sources ==
- A New Introduction to Bibliography, Philip Gaskell. Oxford, 1979. ISBN 0-19-818150-7
- Mudie's Select Library and the Form of Victorian Fiction, George P. Landow. The Victorian Web.
