= Wilkie Collins bibliography =

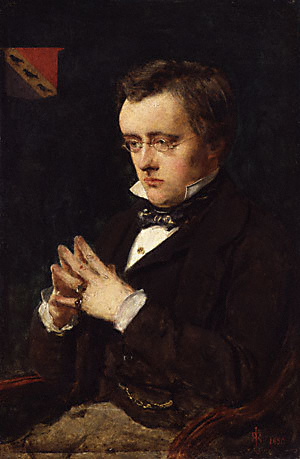
Portrait by John Everett Millais, 1850

This is a bibliography of the works of Wilkie Collins.

== Novels ==
- Iolani, or Tahiti As It Was. A Romance (written 1844, published 1999)
- Antonina (1850)
- Basil (1852)
- Hide and Seek (1854)
- A Rogue's Life (1856 in Household Words, 1879 in book form)
  Collins delayed book publication because he hoped to greatly expand the novel. In the end, it was published in one volume by Richard Bentley and Son with only "occasional additions and improvements", as he explains in the 1879 preface.
- The Dead Secret (1857)
- The Woman in White (1860)
- No Name (1862)
- Armadale (1866)
- The Moonstone (1868)
- Man and Wife (1870)
- Poor Miss Finch (1872)
- The New Magdalen (1873)
- The Law and the Lady (1875)
- The Two Destinies (1876)
- The Fallen Leaves (1879)
- Jezebel's Daughter (1880)
  Novelisation of Collins' play The Red Vial, staged at the Royal Olympic Theatre in 1858.
- The Black Robe (1881)
- Heart and Science (1883)
- I Say No (1884)
- The Evil Genius (1886)
- The Legacy of Cain (1889)
- Blind Love (1890)
  Serial publication was already in progress when Collins died leaving the novel unfinished. Completed by Walter Besant.

== Short fiction ==
=== Collected short fiction ===
There is no complete scholarly edition of Collins' short fiction, but there is a useful starting point:

- Wilkie Collins, The Complete Shorter Fiction, edited by Julian Thompson (London: Robinson, 1995 / New York: Carroll and Graf, 1995)

=== Editions and collections overseen by Collins ===
Collins often revised — sometimes drastically — and retitled his periodical short stories for book publication. Modern anthologists usually reproduce the book versions, but occasionally prefer the earlier periodical versions.

- Mr Wray's Cash Box, or the Mask and the Mystery. A Christmas Sketch (1852)
  A seasonal novella on the model of Charles Dickens' Christmas books.
- After Dark (1856)
  The stories are linked by a new narrative called Leaves from Leah's Diary and given unifying supplementary titles (shown after the date).
  - A Terribly Strange Bed (1852) "The Traveller's Story"
  - A Stolen Letter (1854) "The Lawyer's Story"
  - Sister Rose (1855) "The French Governess's Story"
  - The Lady of Glenwith Grange (1856) "The Angler's Story"
  - Gabriel's Marriage (1853) "The Nun's Story"
  - The Yellow Mask (1855) "The Professor's Story"
- The Queen of Hearts (1859)
  Repeating the device used in After Dark, the short stories in this collection are embedded in a linking narrative so elaborate that the work is identified in some editions as a novel.
  - The Black Cottage (1857)
  - The Family Secret (1857)
  - The Dream-Woman (1855)
  - Mad Monkton (1855)
  - The Dead Hand (1857)
  - The Biter Bit (1858)
  - The Parson's Scruple (1859)
  - A Plot in Private Life (1858)
  - Fauntleroy (1858)
  - Anne Rodway (1856)
- Miss or Mrs? and Other Stories in Outline (1873)
  The novella Miss or Mrs? was followed by two short stories in the first edition. A Mad Marriage was added in the new edition of 1875.
  - Miss or Mrs? (1871)
  - Blow Up with the Brig! (1859)
  - The Fatal Cradle (1861)
  - A Mad Marriage (1874)
- The Frozen Deep and Other Stories (1874)
  The Frozen Deep is based on the 1857 play of the same name that Collins wrote with Dickens. The Dream Woman reworks earlier material, including the short story The Ostler from 1855, which became Brother Morgan's Story of the Dream-Woman in Queen of Hearts.
  - The Frozen Deep
  - The Dream Woman
  - John Jago's Ghost, or The Dead Alive
- The Haunted Hotel, A Mystery of Modern Venice, to which is added My Lady's Money (1879)
  Two substantial novellas, with The Haunted Hotel sometimes reissued on its own as a short novel.
- The Guilty River (1886)
  A novella written by the ailing author in a late burst of energy over a few weeks in autumn 1886. Never serialised, it was published as a book (with paper covers) by Ainsworth in time for Christmas, and supported by an advertising campaign that included a hundred sandwich-board men plying the streets of London "with Guilty River all over them".
- Little Novels (1887)
  Each short story in this collection of previously published pieces is given a new, formulaic title. Here are the original titles followed by the Little Novels titles, which have not gained universal acceptance:
  - The Ghost's Touch (1879) = Mrs. Zant and the Ghost
  - How I Married Him (1881) = Miss Morris and the Stranger
  - Your Money or Your Life (1881) = Mr. Cosway and the Landlady
  - Royal Love (1884) = Mr. Medhurst and the Princess
  - She Loves and Lies (1883) = Mr. Lismore and the Widow
  - The Clergyman's Confession (1875) = Miss Jéromette and the Clergyman
  - A Shocking Story (1878) = Miss Mina and the Groom
  - The Girl at the Gate (1884) = Mr. Lepel and the Housekeeper
  - The Captain's Last Love (1876) = Mr. Captain and the Nymph
  - The Mystery of Marmaduke (1878) = Mr. Marmaduke and the Minister
  - Percy and the Prophet (1877) = Mr. Percy and the Prophet
  - The Duel in Herne Wood (1877) = Miss Bertha and the Yankee
  - An Old Maid's Husband (1886) = Miss Dulane and My Lord
  - Who Killed Zebedee? (1881) = Mr. Policeman and the Cook

=== Collaborations ===
Collins regularly collaborated with Dickens and others, particularly for the Christmas editions of Dickens' periodicals, contributing short stories, chapters or passages to:

- The Wreck of the Golden Mary (1856)
  A novella by Dickens for Household Words with a segment by Collins ("John Steadiman’s Account").
- The Lazy Tour of Two Idle Apprentices (1857)
  A fictionalised chronicle written with Dickens for Household Words.
- The Perils of Certain English Prisoners (1857)
  A short story written with Dickens for Household Words.
- A House to Let (1858)
  A novella for Household Words, written with Dickens, Elizabeth Gaskell and Adelaide Anne Procter.
- The Haunted House (1859)
  A sequence of short stories for All the Year Round, written with Dickens, Elizabeth Gaskell, Adelaide Anne Proctor, George Sala and Hesba Stretton.
- A Message from the Sea (1860)
  A sequence of short stories for All the Year Round, written with Dickens, Robert Buchanan, Charles Allston Collins, Amelia Edwards and Harriet Parr.
- No Thoroughfare (1867)
  A novella written with Dickens for All the Year Round.

The three pieces wholly co-authored with Dickens — The Lazy Tour, Certain English Prisoners and No Thoroughfare — were first reissued together by Chapman and Hall in 1890.

== Non-fiction ==
- Memoirs of the Life of William Collins, Esq., R.A. (1848)
- Rambles Beyond Railways, or, Notes in Cornwall taken a-foot (1851)
  With illustrations by Henry C. Brandling.
- My Miscellanies (1863)

== Plays ==
- The Frozen Deep, drama in three acts (1857–1866)
  1857 version: Composed by Collins and substantially revised by Dickens for four amateur performances (plus a dress rehearsal) before invited audiences in January 1857. Reconstructed from archival sources by Robert Louis Brannan and published as Under the Management of Mr. Charles Dickens, His Production of The Frozen Deep (Ithaca, NY: Cornell University Press, 1966).
  1866 version: Further revised by Collins for a professional production at the Royal Olympic Theatre in October 1866. The script was printed privately for performance use — and copies of this document survive — but it was never published.
- The Red Vial, drama in three acts (1858)
  Staged at the Royal Olympic Theatre in October 1858. Later novelised by Collins as Jezebel's Daughter (1880), but the play itself remained unpublished until 2017, when Francis Boutle produced a limited edition with an introduction by Caroline Radcliffe in conjunction with the Wilkie Collins Society.
- No Thoroughfare, drama in five acts (1867)
  Written with Dickens concurrently with their novella of the same name (All the Year Round, 12 December 1867), which is itself divided into an "overture", four "acts", and an epilogue called "The Curtain Falls". Staged at the Adelphi Theatre in December 1867. Revived at the Royal Olympic Theatre in December 1876. The theatrical version was published as a standalone volume by "The Office of All the Year Round" (1867) and by De Witt in New York (De Witt's Acting Plays nº 14).
- Black and White, drama in three acts (1869)
  Written with Charles Fechter and staged at the Adelphi Theatre in March 1869. Printed and registered at Stationers' Hall in London, apparently for private circulation. Published commercially in New York as nº 296 in the De Witt's Acting Plays series.
- Miss Gwilt, drama in five acts (1875)
  Adapted from Collins' novel Armadale and staged at the Alexandra Theatre in December 1875. Never published, although copies of the script printed privately for performance use survive, including this one at the Internet Archive.

== Screen adaptations ==
Based in part on the work of Alexis Weedon.

=== A Terribly Strange Bed (1852) ===
- The Stronger / A Terribly Strange Bed (1949)
  U.S.A., television, directed by William Cameron Menzies, one episode of the series Fireside Theatre
- A Terribly Strange Bed (1958)
  Canada, television, one episode of the series The Unforeseen
- Przeraźliwe łoże (1968)
  Poland, television, directed by Witold Lesiewicz, one episode of the series Świat grozy, a version in English (A Terribly Strange Bed) was one episode of the series Theatre Macabre
- A Terribly Strange Bed (1973)
  UK, television, directed by Alan Cooke, one episode of the series Orson Welles Great Mysteries

=== Basil (1852) ===
- Basil (1998)
  UK, film, directed by Radha Bharadwaj

=== The Woman in White (1860) ===
- The Woman in White (1912)
  U.S.A., film, version starring Marguerite Snow, James Cruze and William Garwood
- The Woman in White (1912)
  U.S.A., film, version starring Alexander F. Frank, Viola Alberti and Charles Perley
- Tangled Lives (1917)
  U.S.A., film, directed by J. Gordon Edwards
- The Unfortunate Marriage (1917)
  U.S.A., film, directed by Ernest C. Warde
- The Twin Pawns (1919)
  U.S.A., film, directed by Léonce Perret
- The Woman in White (1929)
  UK, film, directed by Herbert Wilcox
- Crimes at the Dark House (1940)
  U.S.A., film, directed by George King
- The Woman in White (1948)
  U.S.A., film, directed by Peter Godfrey
- Kvinna i vitt (1949)
  Sweden, film, directed by Arne Mattsson
- A Mulher de Branco (1956)
  Brazil, television, one episode of the series Teledrama
- The Woman in White (1957)
  UK, television, directed by Herbert Wise, one episode of the series Hour of Mystery
- The Woman in White (1960)
  U.S.A., television, directed by Paul Nickell, one episode of the series Dow Hour of Great Mysteries
- The Woman in White (1966)
  UK, television, directed by Brandon Acton-Bond, series of six episodes
- La dama vestida de blanco (1967)
  Spain, television, directed by Manuel Aguado, one episode of the series Novela
- La Femme en blanc (1970)
  France, television, directed by Pierre Gautherin, series of thirteen episodes
- Die Frau in Weiß (1971)
  Germany, television, directed by Wilhelm Semmelroth, series of three episodes
- La donna in bianco (1980)
  Italy, television, directed by Mario Moroni, series of four episodes
- Zhenshchina v belom (1982)
  Moldova, film, directed by Vadim Derbenyov
- The Woman in White (1982)
  UK, television, directed by John Bruce, series of five episodes
- The Woman in White (1997)
  UK, television, directed by Tim Fywell, series of two episodes
- Kiri ni sumu akuma (2011)
  Japan, television, directed by Ayato Matsuda, series of sixty episodes
- The Woman in White (2018)
  UK, television, directed by Carl Tibbetts, series of five episodes

=== Armadale (1866) ===
- Der rote Schal (1973)
  Germany, television, directed by Wilhelm Semmelroth, series of three episodes

=== The Moonstone (1868) ===
- The Quest of the Sacred Jewel (1914)
  U.S.A., film, directed by George Fitzmaurice
- The Moonstone (1915)
  U.S.A., film, directed by Frank Hall Crane
- The Moonstone (1934)
  U.S.A., film, directed by Reginald Barker
- The Moonstone (1952)
  U.S.A., television, one episode of the series Robert Montgomery Presents
- The Moonstone, Part 1 and The Moonstone, Part 2 (1952)
  Canada, television, two episodes of the series Tales of Adventure
- The Moonstone (1954)
  U.S.A., television, one episode of the series Suspense
- Sergeant Cuff kann den Mondstein nicht finden (1955)
  Germany, television, directed by Peter A. Horn, one episode of the series Die Galerie der großen Detektive
- The Moonstone (1959)
  UK, television, series of seven episodes
- The Moonstone (1972)
  UK, television, directed by Paddy Russell, series of five episodes
- La pietra di luna (1972)
  Italy, television, directed by Anton Giulio Majano, series of six episodes
- Der Monddiamant (1974)
  Germany, television, directed by Wilhelm Semmelroth, series of two episodes
- The Moonstone (1996)
  UK, television, directed by Robert Bierman, series of two episodes
- The Moonstone (2016)
  UK, television, directed by Lisa Mulcahy, series of five episodes

=== Poor Miss Finch (1872) ===
- Lucilla (1979)
  Germany, television, directed by Wilhelm Semmelroth, series of two episodes

=== The New Magdalen (1873) ===
- The New Magdalen (1910)
  U.S.A., film, directed by Joseph A. Golden
- The New Magdalen (1912)
  U.S.A., film, directed by Herbert Brenon
- The New Magdalen (1914)
  U.S.A., film, directed by Travers Vale
- La Place d'une autre (2021)
  France, film, directed by Aurélia Georges

=== The Dream Woman (1874) ===
- The Dream Woman (1914)
  U.S.A., film, directed by Alice Guy
- La mujer del sueño (1975)
  Spain, television, directed by José Antonio Páramo, one episode of the series El quinto jinete

=== Who Killed Zebedee? (1881) ===
- The Policeman and the Cook (1970)
  UK, television, directed by Alan Gibson, one episode of the series ITV Saturday Night Theatre

=== She Loves and Lies (1883) ===
- She Loves and Lies (1920)
  U.S.A., film, directed by Chester Withey
