= The Dead Secret =

1857 novel by Wilkie Collins

The Dead Secret is a novel published by Wilkie Collins, first in 1857 as a series in Charles Dickens' Household Words weekly magazine and later the same year as a book. Much like his later novel The Woman in White (1860), it can be considered one of the earliest example of a sensation novel, as it contains themes of illegitimacy, blackmail, and false identity.

== Synopsis ==
The secret of the title is the parentage of the heroine, Rosamond Treverton, who has been passed off as the daughter of the wealthy former actress Mrs. Treverton of Porthgenna Tower, but is in fact the illegitimate child of her servant Sarah Leeson by a local miner. Mrs. Treverton’s motive was to provide her husband with a child, being apparently unable to bear children herself. Sarah writes down the details of the secret from the words of the dying Mrs. Treverton, and hides the paper bearing the message in an unused room at Porthgenna.

The novel then jumps forward some twenty years. Rosamond has married the blind Leonard Frankland, who now owns Porthgenna Tower. Sarah, now living under her married name, acts as a nurse after Rosamond's birth, and gives Rosamund a cryptic warning to avoid the room in which the Secret is hidden. On a visit to Porthgenna, Rosamond finds the paper detailing the secret and reveals it to Leonard. Leonard, who originally believed that Rosamond was a wealthy heiress, accepts that his wife is illegitimate, but refuses to accept her inheritance as the presumed daughter of the Trevertons. In the course of things, this would now pass to Mrs. Treverton’s miserly brother-in-law Andrew (whose introduction, together with his villainous servant, provides some comic relief in the novel). But Andrew Treverton, somewhat out of character, refuses to accept the windfall and Rosamond remains the heiress of the Trevertons in the expected happy ending.

== Themes and influences ==
Like its predecessor Hide and Seek, the “secret” and the mystery are made clear to the reader, though not to the novel’s characters, at an early stage.

The obsessed and arguably deranged Sarah prefigures the character of Hester Dethridge in Collins's Man and Wife, and more distantly those of Lydia Gwilt in Armadale and the female protagonist of his late novel, The Haunted Hotel.

The blind Leonard is another of Collins's disabled characters. He plays only a small part in the novel, but Collins drew another and more significant blind character in Lucilla, the heroine of his 1872 novel Poor Miss Finch.

Much of the novel is set in Cornwall, one of Collins's favorite English counties, which also features in his early melodrama Basil.

== Publication ==
The Dead Secret was first published serially in Charles Dickens' Household Words weekly magazine in 1857, with 23 installments between January 3rd and June 13th. It was published in book form by Bradbury & Evans later the same year.

== Critical reception ==
Contemporary critics held mixed opinions, some seeing an advance on Collins's previous Hide and Seek, and some less enthusiastic. Peters regards the handling of the “secret” as a weakness in construction, and does not rate the novel highly within Collins's oeuvre. Nadel’s description of it as the last of Collins's "apprentice novels” emphasizes the gap between it and Collins's next novel, the acclaimed The Woman in White. Nevertheless, it has proven enduringly popular and remains in print.
