= Hide and Seek (Collins novel) =

1854 novel by Wilkie Collins

Hide and Seek is Wilkie Collins' third published novel, first published on 6 June 1854. It is the first of his novels involving the solution of a mystery, the elements of which are clearer to the reader than to the novel's characters. Suspense is created from the reader's uncertainty as to which characters will find out the truth, when and how.

== Synopsis ==
The novel has a convoluted plot, in common with many of Collins' works. It falls into two parts:

- the history of "Madonna" Grice
- Matthew Grice's discovery of her.

Mary Grice is courted and seduced by a man calling himself Arthur Carr. Carr is called away on business, and his letters to Mary (presumably professing his honourable intentions toward her) are intercepted by Mary's aunt Joanna, who considers Carr to be socially inferior to the Grices. Joanna drives the pregnant, unmarried Mary from the family home. Mary gives birth to a daughter and dies miserably, attended only by performers from a travelling circus.

Martha Peckover, wife of one of the clowns, adopts the baby (also Mary) and takes possession of her one heirloom, a bracelet made of Mary Sr.'s & Carr's hair. Mary Jr. becomes a circus performer and is struck deaf and dumb after a riding accident, making her one of several of Collins' characters with severe physical disabilities. She is exploited by the circus owner, and to rescue her Mrs Peckover takes her to the home of a minister, Dr Joyce. There Valentine Blyth, a painter, sees her and himself adopts her. Mary Jr. grows up beautiful and acquires the nickname Madonna for her resemblance to figures of the Virgin Mary in Italian Renaissance painting. She is admired by Valentine's friend Zack Thorpe, a high-spirited but vacuous young man somewhat resembling Allan Armadale in the novel of that name. Zack leaves home after disagreements with his ultra-religious and disciplinarian father.

In a brawl in a disreputable theatre, Zack defends a man who turns out to be Matthew (Mat) Grice, Mary Sr.'s brother, and moves in with him. Mat has spent decades wandering the Americas, but returns home after making his fortune on the California goldfields. Mat's next concern is to find out the fate of his family. He establishes from Joanna that Mary Sr. is dead but her child was born alive. Mat decides to trace the child.

Zack introduces Mat to Valentine, who invites Mat to sit for him as a model. In Valentine's house, Mat meets Madonna and also catches sight of a hair bracelet, which he suspects is originally Mary's. He secretly obtains a key to Valentine's bureau and on a visit to the house opens the bureau, identifies the bracelet and satisfies himself that Madonna is Mary's child. He is surprised in the act by Madonna but escapes by blowing out her candle, after which she can neither see nor hear him.

Mat then sets about finding Arthur Carr. His efforts are hindered by Joanna's death and Mrs Peckover's disclosure that neither she nor Valentine know who he was. However Mat is struck by the resemblance between Carr's hair (of which he has obtained the part unused in the bracelet) and Zack's. He surmises that Carr is Zack's straitlaced father, confronts him and obtains his confession.

Madonna is thus revealed as Zack's half-sister, and he can no longer court her. He accompanies Mat to the New World, but eventually persuades him to return home to his adoptive "family" of the Blyths (with whom Madonna remains) and Zack.

== Themes and influences ==
In drawing the character of Madonna, Collins studied the work of medical authorities on traumatic deafness. Careful research of unusual and unlikely plot events is a feature of much of his work, to which it gives an enhanced sense of realism.

Critics have seen in Mr Thorpe Sr. a portrait of Collins' own father. A further biographical element is Zack's unwilling apprenticeship to a tea broker, paralleling Collins'. Peters also sees Blyth as being modelled on the artist Holman Hunt.

== Publication ==
Hide and Seek was first published in 1854 by Bentley and was not a great commercial success. Collins blamed the "distraction" of the Crimean War. A revised edition was published by Sampson, Low in 1861. The novel has proved enduringly popular and remains in print.

== Critical reception ==
Hide and Seek was hailed by both contemporary and modern critics to be an advance on his previous work, the sensational melodrama Basil, though inferior to The Woman in White and other novels of his mature period.
