= The Black Robe =

1881 novel by Wilkie Collins

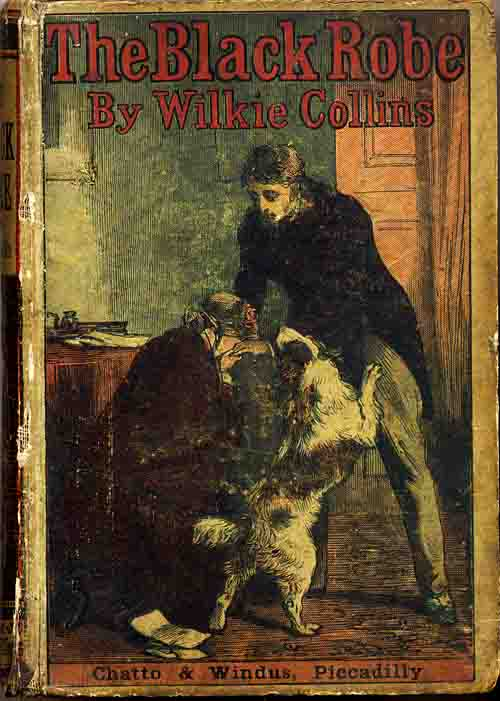
- Author: Wilkie Collins
- Language: English
- Genre: Epistolary, Mystery Novel, Sensation novel
- Publisher: All the Year Round
- Publication date: 1881
- Publication place: United Kingdom
- Media type: Print (Hardback & Paperback)
- Preceded by: Jezebel's Daughter (1880)
- Followed by: Heart and Science (1883)

The Black Robe is an 1881 partially-epistolary novel by famed English writer, Wilkie Collins. The book, which relates the misadventures of one "Lewis Romayne", is noted for its anti-Catholic lens.

== Plot summary ==
As the story begins, Romayne and his friend, Major Hynd, are in Boulogne to visit Romayne's aunt, who is dying. While there, Romayne attends a card game, where he has an argument with a corrupt card sharp, the General, who challenges him to a duel. However, the general doesn't turn up himself but nominates his son, an accurate shot, who should win the duel. Romayne absolutely does not want to fight but is goaded into doing so. Against the odds, he accidentally kills his opponent, and the screams of the man's brother after the death come to haunt Romayne for the rest of his life.

Romayne returns to his Yorkshire home, called Vange Abbey. Even in his own home, the Frenchman's younger brother's awful cries follow him. He finally leaves for London, to visit his old friend Lord Loring, who is the patriarch of a well-heeled Catholic family. While there, he meets Stella Eyrecourt, who falls in love with him. A Catholic priest named Father Benwell, who serves as a spiritual leader for the Lorings, determines that he will convert Romayne to the church, employing the services of young priest, Arthur Penrose, to this end. This is all done in an attempt to bring Romayne's family home, Vange, back to the church, who owned it before Romayne's family.

Romayne, who is still haunted by the duel, sends Major Hynd to enquire about the family of the man he killed in hopes of assisting them monetarily. Additionally, he confides in Penrose who becomes a true friend to Romayne, despite his presumed ulterior motives.

Father Benwell employs various tactics to undermine Romayne's marriage to Stella, finally culminating in the revelation of Stella's prior bigamous marriage to Bernard Winterfield. Winterfield had fallen in love with Stella and married her while erroneously believing that his wife from a previous marriage was dead.

Eventually, Romayne is promoted to an ecclesiastical post in Paris. However, knowing that he is dying, Romayne finally decides to see Stella and his son. Father Benwell brings Romayne's lawyer to his deathbed, trying to confirm the validity of the will in an attempt to ensure the church inherits Vange. But as he dies, Romayne acknowledges he loves his wife and child, and has the will destroyed. This causes Vange—and the entire inheritance—to pass to his family, foiling Benwell's plans.

== Structure ==
The structure of the book took on a different form than Collins' more well-known novels such as The Moonstone and The Woman in White. The latter novels used a form in which the narrative of the story is dispersed across many narrators. In The Black Robe, Collins chose to use a series of "scenes" to organize the novel coherently. While it is unclear why he chose to divert so radically from a previously successful structure, he had also done this in a previous novel, No Name.

== Critical reception ==
Writing for The Spectator, E. A. Collins, who was herself a minor novelist, gave the novel a generally unfavorable review. However oddly enough, she recommended the novel for its "readability." The same reviewer complained of an "unnaturalness" present in the book, and a lack of development of significant characters.

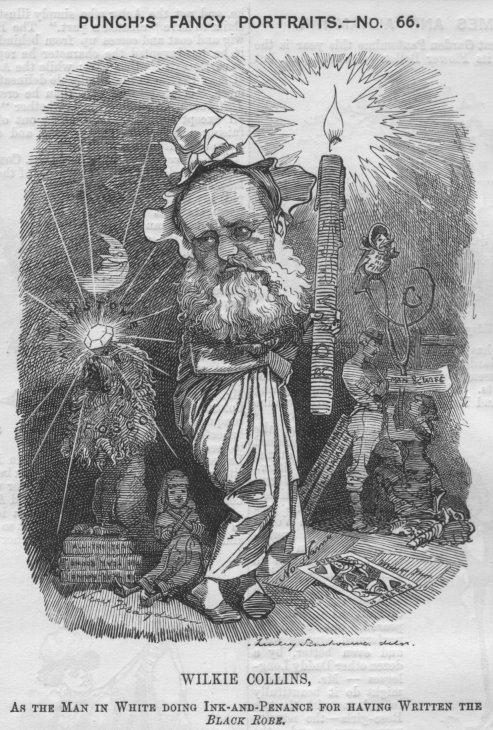
Political cartoon showing Collins doing penance for writing The Black Robe.

== Accusations of anti-Catholic bias ==
In writing the book, Collins has been accused of perpetuating an anti-Catholic bias common in the late 19th century. Collins himself may have helped fuel this belief, as he wrote to the Canadian Publisher of The Black Robe, regarding the Jesuits, "We must do all that we can to keep these 'black-robed gentlemen' within due limits."

== See also ==
- The Woman in White
- Anti-Catholicism
