= Who Killed Zebedee? =

1881 book by Wilkie Collins

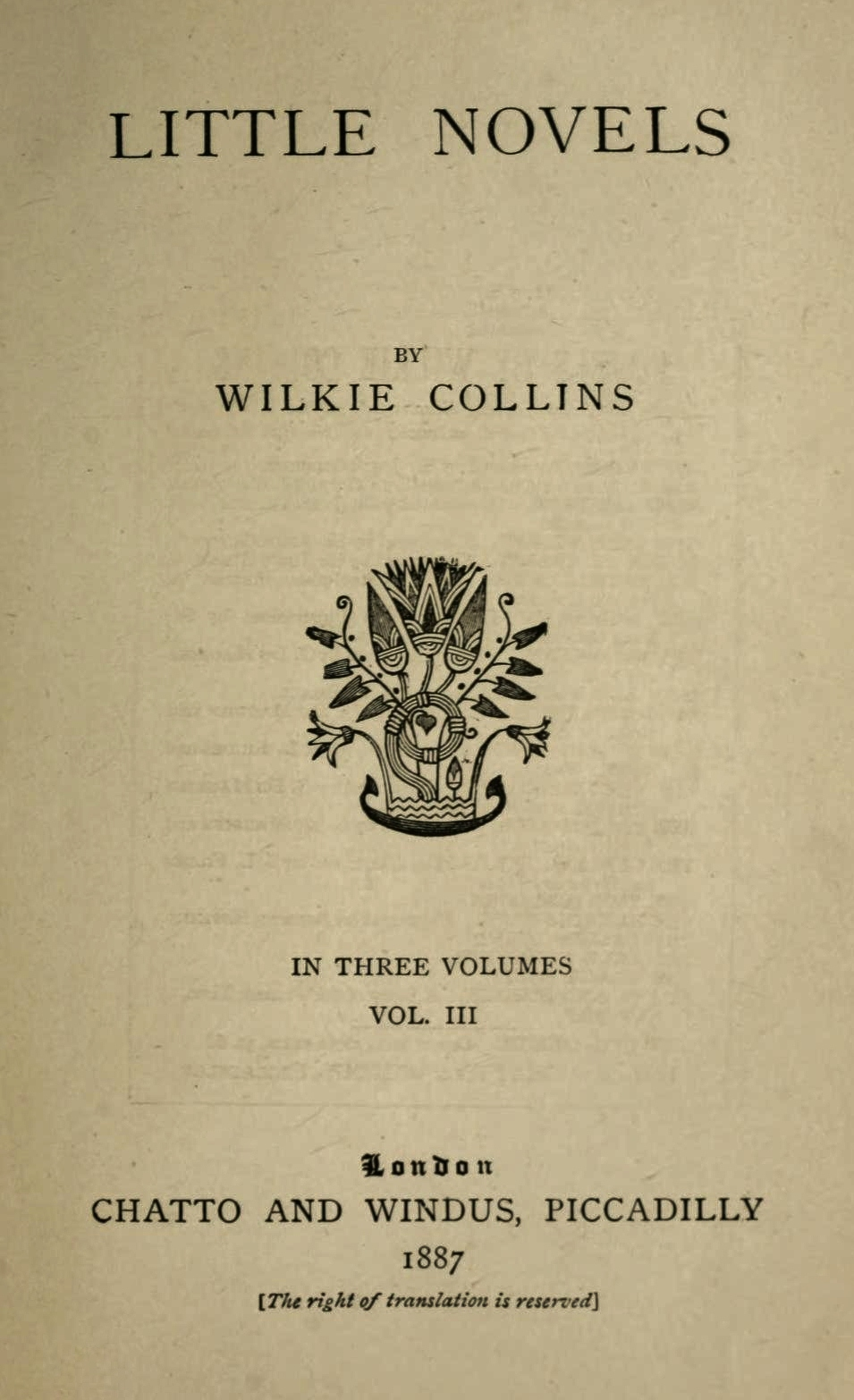
- Title page to the first edition in book form (vol 3 contained Who Killed Zebedee? and three other works)
- Author: Wilkie Collins
- Original title: The Policeman & The Cook
- Language: English
- Genre: detective fiction, short story
- Publication date: 1881
- Publication place: United Kingdom
- Media type: Print
- ISBN: 978-1-84391-019-0

Who Killed Zebedee? is a short detective story by Wilkie Collins, first published in 1880. A young wife is convinced that, while sleepwalking, she has murdered her own husband, John Zebedee. Together, a young constable and the cook from the couple's final lodgings attempt to uncover the truth.

== Plot summary ==
"Who Killed Zebedee?" opens with a direct address to the readers by an otherwise unnamed narrator. On his deathbed, our narrator, a Roman Catholic, feels compelled to make a confession to the readers about his involvement in an unsolved murder case back when he was still a young police constable in London.

The recounting of the death of Zebedee opens with a distraught young woman, Priscilla Thurlby, the cook at the Zebedee's boarding house, rushing into the police station with a blood-curdling scream. Priscilla informs the skeptical assembly that, "A young woman has murdered her husband in the night!" While the police initially suspect the young woman to be intoxicated, they eventually visit the boarding house to find that a young, married man has been stabbed in the back with a knife.

The police immediately begin an inspection of the scene of the crime. The lodgers of the boarding house are interviewed, all of whom prove to be eccentric, however, during the interviews, the young constable and his fellow officers become increasingly suspicious of Mr. Deluc, a smarmy cigar agent, who had made repeated amorous advances towards Mrs. Zebedee. This suspicion is confounded by Mrs. Zebedee, who is positive she has killed her husband in her sleep. A sleepwalker, Mrs. Zebedee had read a story about a young woman who had murdered her husband in her sleep before falling asleep on the night her husband was murdered. The police suspect the real answer might hinge on the half-inscribed knife, "To John Zebedee-" still wedged in Zebedee's back, but a preliminary search reveals nothing.

After several false leads, interest in the case wanes, until the police and the public abandon the case entirely. Finally, the young constable is the only one left with a vested interest. Over the course of the investigation, the constable falls in love with Priscilla Thurlby, and proposes marriage. Priscilla rejects him on the basis of their both being working class and unable to afford a marriage. The constable becomes convinced that if he can solve the case, they can have their marriage and so Priscilla acquiesces and invites him home to her village to meet her family.

On the way to Priscilla's country home, the constable is detained by an incompetent railroad station attendant and ends up temporarily stranded in the town of Waterbank. As he waits for the next train, he notices a shopfront, James Wycomb, Cutler etc., and begins to wonder whether the London police have fully exhausted all cutlers in their investigation. The discovery the constable makes inside brings the case to its dramatic conclusion.

== Characters ==
The Narrator
An unnamed police constable.
Priscilla Thurlby
The attractive, young cook at the Zebedee's lodgings and the young constable's romantic interest.
John Zebedee
The victim, a young newlywed.
Mrs. Zebedee
The widow, a young woman reportedly very much in love with her husband, who is a suspect in his death due to her frequent bouts of somnambulism.
Miss Mybus
A reclusive old woman interviewed by the police who, literally, refuses to be seen.
Mr. Garfield
An old bachelor who works for the merchant's office.
Mr. Deluc
A Creole from Martinique, Mr. Deluc is a cigar agent and the young constable's primary suspect.
Mrs. Crosscapel
Joint-owner of the lodging house.
Mr. Scorrier
A cutler.

== Literary significance ==
While Who Killed Zebedee? is largely classified as a melodrama, it introduced some now-iconic elements of modern detective fiction. Here, as in his more famous novels The Moonstone and The Woman in White, Collins uses the "least likely person" motif, a popular element in many modern-day detective novels. Meanwhile, 20th century noir novels are hardly complete without the introduction of a femme fatale bursting through the detective's door screaming for help or an heroically flawed detective tortured over the duplicity of his lady love.
