= Ozias Midwinter =

Ozias Midwinter may refer to:

- Ozias Midwinter, a character in Armadale
- Ozias Midwinter, a pen-name of Lafcadio Hearn
