= Man and Wife (novel) =

1870 novel by Wilkie Collins

Man and Wife is Wilkie Collins's ninth published novel, first published in 1870. It is a sensation novel, and the second of his novels (after No Name) in which social questions provide the main impetus of the plot. Collins increasingly used his novels to explore social abuses, which according to critics tends to detract from their qualities as fiction. The social issue which drives the plot is the state of Scots marriage law; at the time the novel was written, any couple who were legally entitled to marry and who asserted that they were married, either before witnesses or in writing, were regarded in Scotland as being legally married.

== Plot summary ==
The novel has a complex plot, which is common in Collins's work. In the Prologue, a selfish and ambitious man casts off his wife in order to marry a wealthier and better-connected woman by taking advantage of a loophole in the marriage laws of Ireland.

The initial action takes place in the widowed Lady Lundie's house in Scotland. Geoffrey Delamayn has promised marriage to his lover Anne Silvester (governess to Lady Lundie's stepdaughter Blanche), who has incurred the enmity of her employer. The spendthrift Geoffrey is about to be disinherited and wishes to escape from his promise and marry a wealthy wife. Nevertheless, he is obliged to arrange a rendezvous with Anne, in the character of his wife, at an inn, and documents this in an exchange of notes with her. Subsequently, urgent matters force him to send his friend Arnold Brinkworth, Blanche's fiancé, to Anne in his place. To gain access to her, Arnold must ask for "his wife". Although nothing improper passes between them, they appear to the landlady and to Bishopriggs, a waiter, to be man and wife.

Thus, both Geoffrey and Arnold might be deemed to be married to Anne, depending on the weight put on the spoken and written evidence. Most of the novel concerns Anne's, Geoffrey's and Arnold's attempts to clarify their marital status:

- Anne needs to be married to save her reputation
- Geoffrey wishes to cast off Anne by asserting that she is married to Arnold
- Arnold wishes to marry Blanche but fears he has accidentally already married Anne under Scots law.

In subsequent chapters Geoffrey, a keen athlete, courts Mrs Glenarm, a wealthy young widow, while Anne consults lawyers who give her conflicting advice about her position, and later tries to explain the situation to Mrs Glenarm, who rebuffs her. Arnold seeks the advice of Lady Lundie’s brother-in-law Sir Patrick Lundie, a retired lawyer. Sir Patrick approaches the problem with energy, but owing to various mishaps, Geoffrey’s determination that his scheme shall succeed, and the unsatisfactory state of the law, is not immediately successful. However, he ascertains that the correspondence linking Geoffrey and Anne exists and was stolen at the inn by Bishopriggs, who tries to extort money for it. Anne, who strongly wishes to remove any impediment to Blanche and Arnold’s marriage, comes to the same conclusion and forces Bishopriggs to give her the letter by threatening to reveal its contents, which would make it worthless for blackmail. Eventually Anne offers to reveal her relations with Geoffrey, even at the cost of her reputation – impressing Sir Patrick with her courageous and honourable behaviour. At a meeting of all the parties and their lawyers, she makes her revelations. Geoffrey can no longer avoid honouring his promise to her and acknowledges her as his wife.

A sub-plot concerns Geoffrey’s athleticism. While training for an important race, Geoffrey is discovered to have a serious physical ailment rendering him liable to a paralytic stroke. In the race itself, in which Geoffrey represents the South of England against the North, he collapses near the end, leaving his opponent the victor. His “friends” desert him, having lost their bets placed on him.

The novel finally becomes a thriller. Geoffrey takes Anne to a secluded cottage in which the cook-housekeeper Hester Dethridge (who also features in the earliest scenes) is mute. Hester inadvertently reveals to Geoffrey that she murdered her brutal and rapacious husband by dismantling part of the wall of his (locked) bedroom in an almost-invisible way, leaning through and smothering him. Geoffrey forces Hester to show him how to do the same to Anne. By various stratagems he gets Anne to sleep in a suitably-placed bed. However he suffers a stroke when about to smother her, and while unconscious is throttled by Hester, who belatedly recognises the enormity of what she has been abetting. Sir Patrick, knowing the danger in which Anne is placed, has kept watch outside the house and, when Anne gives the alarm, duly rescues her.

In the final scene, Lady Lundie awaits a visit from Sir Patrick and his new bride. She is chagrined to discover that the lady in question, who takes precedence over her in the family, is her enemy Anne.

== Themes and influences ==
The theme of the Prologue is repeated in the main action, Anne and Blanche being the daughters of the abandoned women and her dearest friend.

Apart from the marriage laws of Scotland, discussed above, Collins attacks the legal disadvantages of married women – also a mainspring of the plot of The Woman in White – and the cult of athleticism. In the novel he describes the practice of competitive athletics as dangerous to the athlete's health, and as productive of anti-intellectualism and brutality.

Page points out that the last of these is not cognate with the other two, both of which were widely recognised as scandalous and were soon rectified by changes to the law, whereas athleticism and athletes appear to have been a pet hate of the diminutive and un-athletic Collins. However he argues that an obsession with physical, rather than intellectual or moral, culture is emblematic of the brutality and coarseness present in the social attitudes of the period. Page also notes the sexual element, explicit for the time, in the relationship of Geoffrey and Mrs Glenarm.

Like No Name, the novel is structured in scenes, reflecting Collins's enduring interest in the theatrical. Peters states that it was “one of [his novels] originally conceived as a play”. Page notes that the action would have been too controversial to have been presented on the Victorian stage.

Collins put effort into ensuring the accuracy of the novel's action in terms of the law of the time. Law was a subject of abiding interest to him, and legal questions and lawyers appear often in his works, notably in The Woman in White, Armadale, No Name and The Moonstone.

== Publication ==
Man and Wife was first published in 1870 as a serial in Cassell's Magazine (London) and Harper's Weekly (New York). It was published in book form by F. S. Ellis the same year.

== Critical reception ==
The novel, the next in sequence after Collins's highly successful The Moonstone, was a commercial success. Among modern critics, Peters holds a low opinion of its plot and characterisation, but Page argues that it should be classed with Collins's acclaimed 1860s fiction rather than with his later, and inferior, polemical novels. The novel has proved enduringly popular and remains in print.

== Dramatization ==
Three stage adaptations were written by Americans: Fred Lyster's was adopted by the California Theatre, San Francisco; another, by one F. Williams, had a successful run in Boston, a third, by Frank M. Mayo, was adapted by Augustin Daly in New York, and had a long run. Mary Gladstane secured the sole right to play this version in the Australian colonies and in England.
