= Basil (novel) =

1852 novel by Wilkie Collins

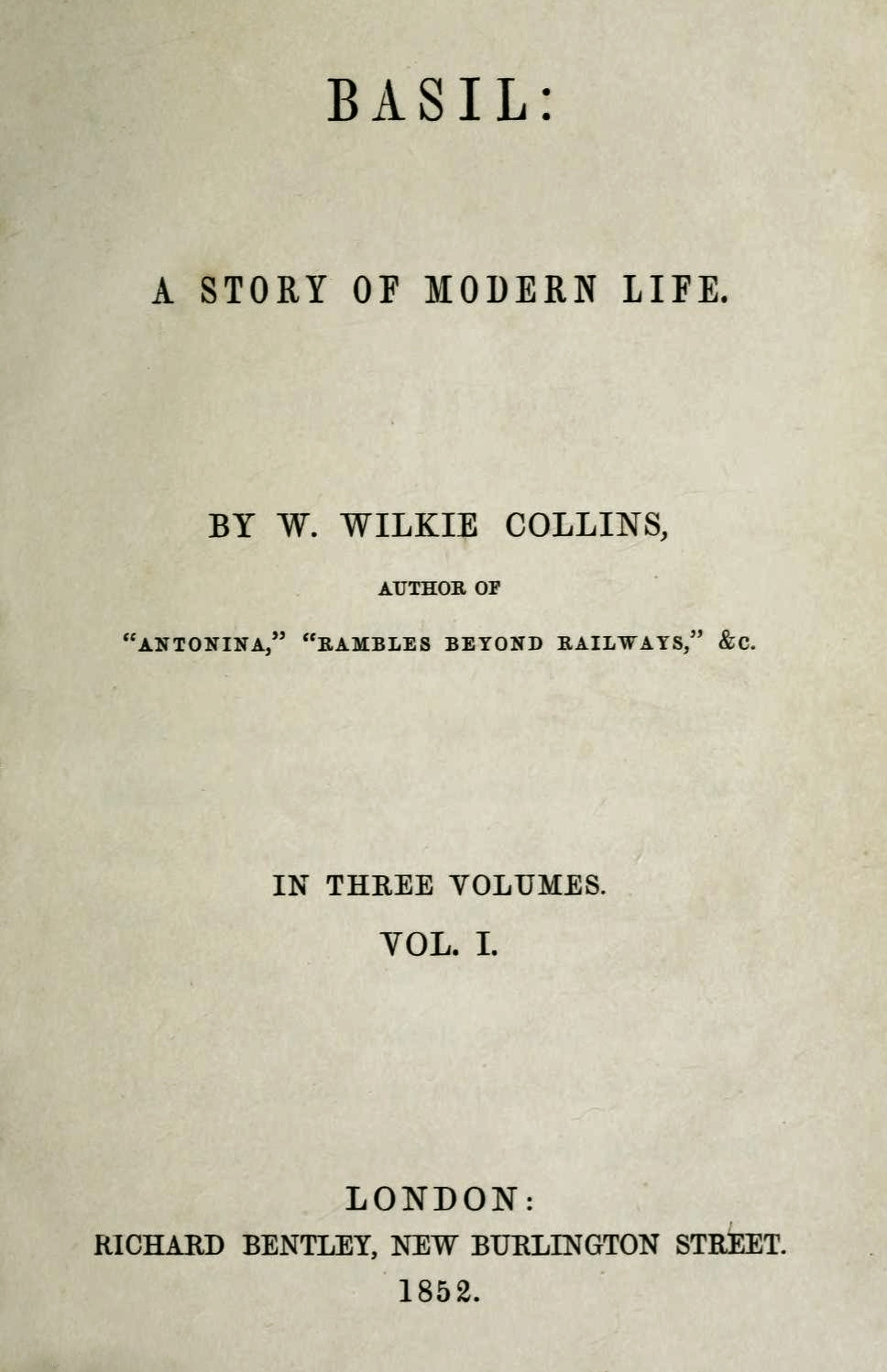
- First edition title page
- Author: Wilkie Collins
- Language: English
- Genre: Fiction
- Set in: Cornwall
- Published: 1852
- Publication place: UK

Basil is the second novel written in 1852 by the British author Wilkie Collins, after Antonina.

== Plot summary ==
Basil, son of a father who values the family pedigree and who would not let him marry below his station, falls in love at first sight with a girl he sees on a bus. He follows her and discovers she is Margaret Sherwin, only daughter of a linen draper. He persuades her father to let him marry her secretly. He agrees on the condition, that, as his daughter is only seventeen, they live apart for the first year. At first the secret works, but then the mysterious Mannion, whose emotions cannot be read in his face, returns from abroad. On the last night of the year Basil follows Margaret and Mannion and discovers them in flagrante delicto. Basil attacks Mannion in the street and tries to murder him, but succeeds only in mutilating his face by pushing it into the fresh tarmacadam in the road. Mannion survives, recovers and swears revenge, and it is revealed that Basil's father indirectly caused Mannion's father to be hanged for forgery.

Basil repudiates Margaret, but Sherwin threatens him with exposure unless he holds to his marriage. Basil confesses to his father, who disowns him, but his sister Clara stands by him. Basil's brother Ralph undertakes to buy Sherwin off, but meanwhile Margaret flees to Mannion, thereby acknowledging her guilt. Visiting Mannion in hospital, she catches typhus and dies. Basil, having been put on her track by Ralph, visits her on her deathbed. Basil flees from Mannion to Cornwall.

The dénouement is worthy of Conan Doyle, set among whirlpools and cliffs near Lands End.

== Themes and criticism ==
In her introduction (Oxford World's Classics Edition), Dorothy Goldman applies psychoanalytic theories to argue that Basil and Mannion, Margaret and Clara, are each like opposite halves of the same person. A further doublet is between the active Ralph and the passive Basil, as the former notes in his dialogue. Mrs Sherwin, Margaret's mother, is apparently feeble-minded and as such is the precursor of Sarah Leeson (The Dead Secret), Mrs Wragge (No Name) and other of Collins' deranged woman characters - though she is astute enough to suspect Margaret and Mannion's guilty secret.

One criticism of the book's plot is that it is highly coincidental that Mannion's father lost his life as a consequence of actions set in motion by Basil's father. The fact that the very woman Basil randomly follows is so closely connected to Basil, via Mannion, despite being a total stranger, can be considered to be a plot flaw.

== Adaptations ==
The novel was adapted into the 1998 film of the same name.
