= A House to Let =

1858 collaborative novella

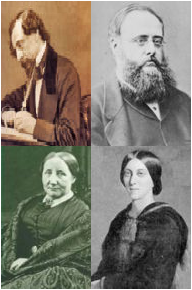
- The four authors (clockwise from top left): Dickens, Collins, Procter and Gaskell.
- Author: Charles Dickens, Wilkie Collins, Elizabeth Gaskell, Adelaide Anne Procter
- Language: English
- Publication date: 1858
- Publication place: United Kingdom
- Media type: Print (Hardcover)

A House to Let is a novella written as collaborative fiction by Charles Dickens, Wilkie Collins, Elizabeth Gaskell and Adelaide Anne Procter. It was originally published in 1858 in the Christmas edition of Dickens's Household Words magazine. Collins wrote the introduction and collaborated with Dickens on the second story and ending, while Gaskell and Proctor wrote the third and fifth chapters respectively.

== Overview ==
"A House to Let" was the first collaboration between the four writers, although Collins and Dickens had worked with Procter on previous Christmas stories for the magazine in 1854, 1855, and 1856. The four authors would write together again in 1859's "The Haunted House" which appeared in the extra Christmas number of All the Year Round, the successor to Household Words which Dickens had started after a dispute with his publishers.

In a letter to Collins from 6 September 1858, Dickens outlined his idea for a Christmas story. He originally envisaged the story being written by himself and Collins with his plot outline fleshed out by Collins, but was later to invite Gaskell and Procter to contribute chapters. Dickens and Collins wrote the first chapter, "Over the Way", and the last chapter "Let at Last" together, and each of the writers wrote one of the intervening chapters: Gaskell "The Manchester Marriage", Dickens "Going into Society", Procter "Three Evenings in the House" and Collins "Trottle's Report".

== Plot ==
The plot concerns an elderly woman, Sophonisba, who notices signs of life in a supposedly empty dilapidated house (the eponymous "House to Let") opposite her own and employs the efforts of an elderly admirer, Jabez Jarber, and her servant, Trottle, to discover what is happening within.

== Adaptations ==
A dramatisation of "A House to Let" was broadcast on BBC Radio 4 during the week of 11–15 December 2006. It was repeated on BBC Radio 4 Extra during the week 26–30 December 2011, again in December 2014 and again during the week 19–23 December 2016. A further repeat on BBC Radio 4 Extra was in December 2018.
