= Basil (film) =

- DVD cover
- Directed by: Radha Bharadwaj
- Written by: Radha Bharadwaj
- Based on: Basil by Wilkie Collins
- Produced by: Radha Bharadwaj
- Starring: Christian Slater; Jared Leto; Claire Forlani; Rachel Pickup; Derek Jacobi
- Cinematography: David Johnson
- Edited by: Craig Nisker
- Music by: Richard G Mitchell
- Production company: Showcareer Limited Production
- Distributed by: The Kushner-Locke Company
- Release date: 22 July 1998
- Running time: 113 minutes
- Country: United Kingdom
- Language: English

Basil is a 1998 British historical drama film directed by Radha Bharadwaj and starring Christian Slater, Jared Leto, Claire Forlani and Derek Jacobi. It was based on the 1852 novel Basil by Victorian author Wilkie Collins. The adaptation is by Bharadwaj.

== Plot ==
Basil recalls his younger days when he and his ennobled British family live at their Cornwall estate of Windermere Hall. His father, Frederick, is a firm believer that people should know their place in society. Clara Fairfax is an orphaned daughter of Basil's father's friend, and comes to live with Basil's family. Basil's older brother, Ralph, is, for his transgression with a local girl, banished to a distant, derelict family manor in Yorkshire. Later, Basil is home from Oxford University when he is rescued by a London merchant, John Mannion. Basil comes to think of John as his friend.

While staying at his family's London home, Basil attempts to reconnect with John, and instead meets Julia Sherwin, the daughter of John's employer. Basil pursues her and she rejects him, but shortly before Basil is to come of age and inherit money and property, he secretly weds her. Julia sets her intentions on taking Windermere Hall in exchange for her affections.

Basil finds Julia in bed with John; Basil beats him until he cannot get up. John disappears. Basil tells his father of the marriage, and is banished. Basil makes his way to his brother in Yorkshire. It is there that Basil receives a letter from John telling him of the scheme involving Julia to avenge the death of John's pregnant sister (by Ralph) after Ralph was banished years before.

Julia is at Windermere; Basil helps deliver her newborn baby. John, with his face wrapped in cloth, arrives. Julia dies. John leaves the child behind when Basil chases him towards a cliff with a zulfiqar sword. During the scuffle, John's face is revealed, and he sees his disfigured reflection in the sword; he takes his own life by falling off the seaside cliff.

Basil takes the newborn child and, naming her Clara after his childhood friend, escapes to Ireland. There, Basil returns to the writing, telling the stories he had started as a youth and eventually returning to London where the stories are to be published. Walking beside a pond, Basil and Clara come upon Basil's older friend Clara, who encourages Basil to make amends with his father, who happens to be sitting nearby. The elderly Frederick explains that he loved Basil's dead mother, and that the banishments were the result of having seen mirrored in his sons his own treatment of his dead wife. Basil and Clara make London their home.

== Cast ==
- Jared Leto as Basil
  - Jackson Leach as young Basil
- Christian Slater as John Mannion
  - Guy Witcher as young John Mannion
- Claire Forlani as Julia Sherwin
- Rachel Pickup as Clara Fairfax
  - Carli Harris as young Clara Fairfax
- Derek Jacobi as Frederick, Basil's father
- David Ross as Mr. Sherwin, Julia's merchant father
- Joanna John as Agnes, Basil's mother
- Christopher Owen as Mr. Mannion, John's father
- Stephanie Bagshaw as Emma Mannion, John's sister
- Crispin Bonham-Carter as Ralph
- Jenny Downham as Anna, Ralph's wife
- Sarah Hadland as Windermere Hall Chambermaid
- Ann Louise Grimshaw as Knitting Nurse
- Michael Lieber as Boy with fishing rod
- Georgiana Johnson as young Clara, Basil's daughter
- Glenn Marks as Tramp
- Hannah Morris as Regent's Park House Maid
- Matthew Steer as young Ralph
- Maisie Tomlinson as a Maid in the Sherwin household
- Jack Wild as Peddler

== Reception ==
The director's cut for Basil was selected twice to be the closing night film for the Toronto International Film Festival’s Special Presentation series. The film was pulled from the festival screening at the last minute, foregoing an opportunity to screen at one of the world's premier film festivals. Basil was also chosen for a prime slot at the Los Angeles Film Festival. In February 1998, Basil was screened at the American Film Market.

== Release ==
Basil’s financiers released their cut of the film, complete with their choice of sound, design and music. This is the version that was subsequently released on cable, and then in videotape and DVD.

The film was released theatrically on 4 March 1998, it was released on videocassette on 1 February 2000 by Buena Vista Home Entertainment. On 4 March 2003, Buena Vista Home Entertainment released a DVD for region 1; a DVD for region 2 was released on 12 April 2005 by ILC Video.

== See also ==
- British films of 1998
- Cinema of the United Kingdom
