= The Fallen Leaves (novel) =

1879 novel by Wilkie Collins

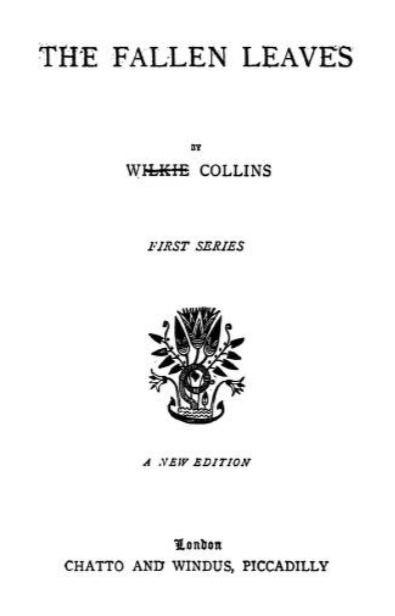
- Title page for The Fallen Leaves (1879)
- Author: Wilkie Collins
- Language: English
- Genre: Fiction
- Published: 1879
- Publisher: Chatto and Windus
- Publication place: UK
- Pages: 355

The Fallen Leaves is an 1879 novel by Wilkie Collins. The book was dedicated to Caroline Graves.

== Summary ==
The plot details American Christian Socialist Amelius Goldenheart's sojourn to England after exile from his Utopian commune, and his difficulties when elements of his past life resurface.
