= Antonina (Collins novel) =

1850 novel by Wilkie Collins

- Author: Wilkie Collins
- Language: English
- Genre: Historical
- Publisher: Richard Bentley
- Publication date: 1850
- Publication place: United Kingdom
- Media type: Print

Antonina, or the Fall of Rome is an 1850 historical novel by Wilkie Collins.

The novel was completed in 1848 and, after the first two publishers refused to accept it, it was issued by Richard Bentley as a three-volume book early in 1850. It is the only example of Collins writing a classical romance novel; and it was met, as Collins later recalled, "with such a chorus of praise as has never been sung over me since". Bentley advertised it in the March 1850 issue of Athenaeum, quoting a full column of "effusive praise from nine dailies and weeklies" where, for example, The Observer described it as "a remarkable book", and The Morning Post lauded it as "sufficient to place [its author] in the very first rank of English novelists". July issue of Harper's Magazine hailed its "splendour of imagination", while another issue of The Athenaeum and an issue of The Eclectic Review compared Collins to William Shakespeare.
