= Wilkie Collins =

English novelist and playwright (1824–1889)

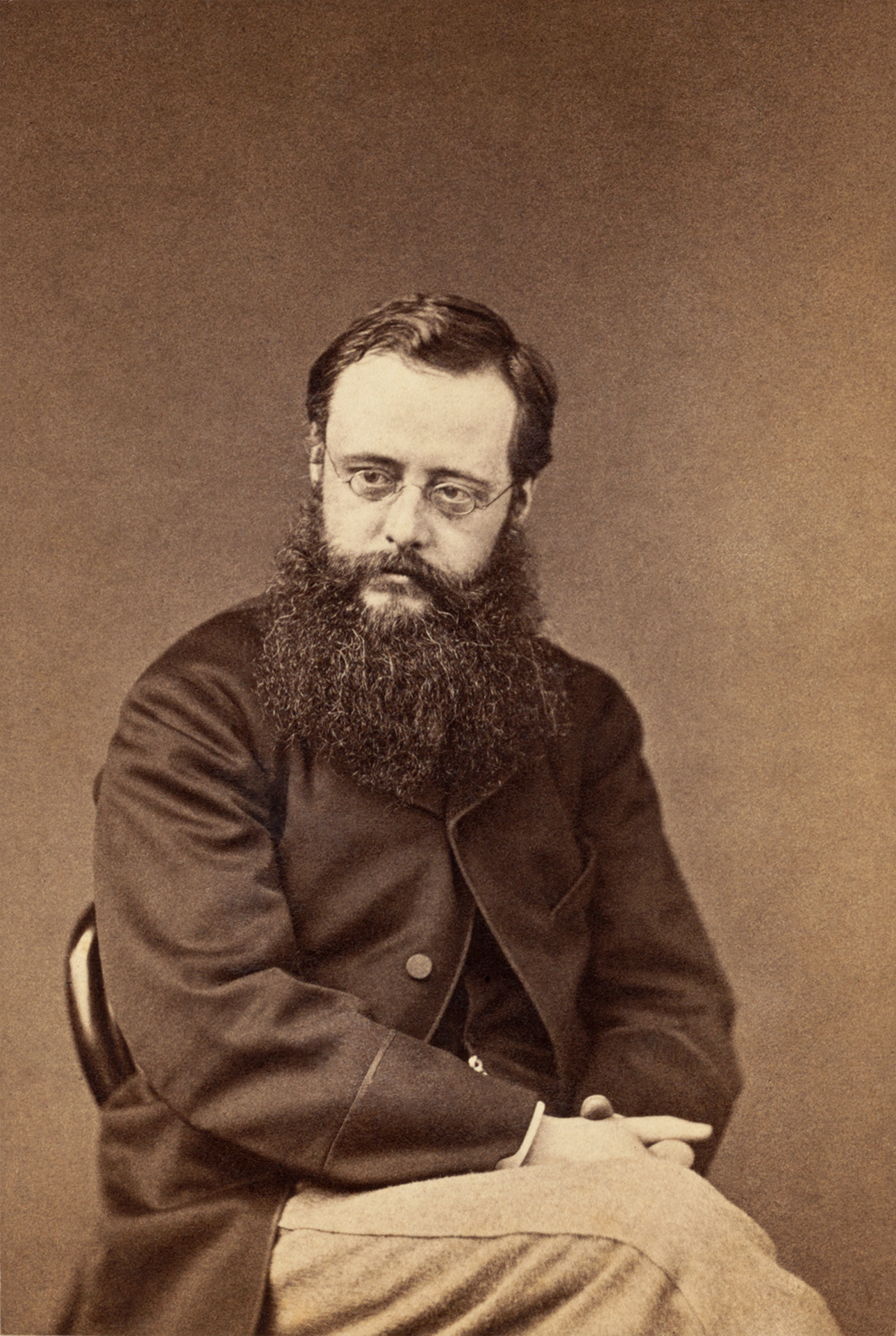
- Collins in 1864
- Born: William Wilkie Collins; 8 January 1824; Marylebone, London, England
- Died: 23 September 1889 (aged 65); London, England
- Partners: Caroline Graves (1858–1889; his death); Martha Rudd (1868–1889; his death)
- Children: 3
- Writing career
- Period: 1840s–1880s
- Genres: Fiction, drama

Signature
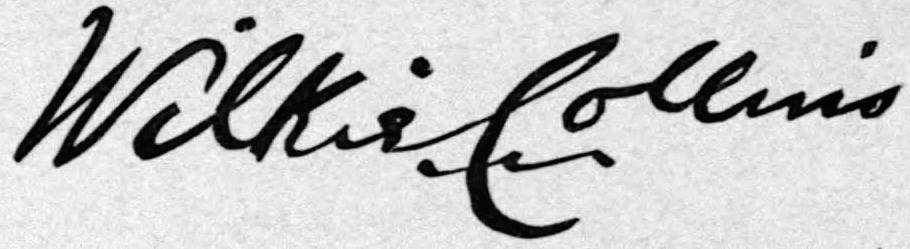

William Wilkie Collins (8 January 1824 – 23 September 1889) was an English novelist and playwright known especially for The Woman in White (1860), a mystery novel and early sensation novel, and for The Moonstone (1868), which established many of the ground rules of the modern detective novel and is also perhaps the earliest clear example of the police procedural genre.

Born to the London painter William Collins and his wife, Harriet Geddes, he moved with them to Italy when he was twelve, living there and in France for two years, learning both Italian and French. He worked initially as a tea merchant. After Antonina, his first novel, was published in 1850, Collins met Charles Dickens, who became his friend and mentor. Some of Collins' work appeared in Dickens' journals Household Words and All the Year Round. They also collaborated on drama and fiction. Collins gained financial stability and an international following by the 1860s. In the 1870s and 1880s, after becoming addicted to the opium which he took for his gout, the quality of his health declined and, in turn, the reception of his artistic output.

Collins criticised the institution of marriage. He had relationships with two women: widow Caroline Graves – living with her for most of his life, treating her daughter as his – and the younger Martha Rudd, with whom he had three children.

== Early life ==
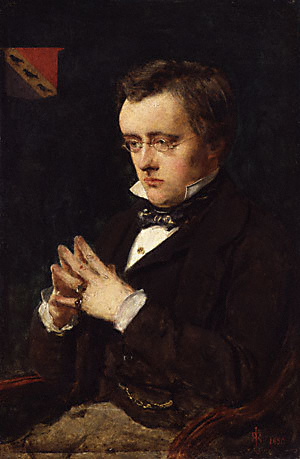
Portrait of Wilkie Collins by John Everett Millais, 1850

Collins was born at 11 New Cavendish Street, London, the son of William Collins, a well-known Royal Academician landscape painter, and his wife, Harriet Geddes. Named after his father, he soon became known by his middle name, which honoured his godfather, the painter David Wilkie. The family moved to Pond Street, Hampstead, in 1826. In 1828 Collins's brother Charles Allston Collins was born. Between 1829 and 1830, the Collins family moved twice, first to Hampstead Square and then to Porchester Terrace, Bayswater. Wilkie and Charles received their early education from their mother at home. The Collins family were deeply religious, and Collins's mother enforced strict church attendance on her sons, which Wilkie disliked.

In 1835, Collins began attending school at the Maida Vale academy. From 1836 to 1838, he lived with his parents in Italy and France, which made a great impression on him. He learned Italian while in Italy and began learning French, in which he would eventually become fluent. From 1838 to 1840, he attended the Reverend Cole's private boarding school in Highbury, where he was bullied. One boy forced Collins to tell him a story every night before allowing him to go to sleep. "It was this brute who first awakened in me, his poor little victim, a power of which but for him I might never have been aware.... When I left school I continued story telling for my own pleasure," Collins later said.

In 1840 the family moved to 85 Oxford Terrace, Bayswater. In late 1840, Collins left school at the age of nearly 17 and was apprenticed as a clerk to the firm of tea merchants Antrobus & Co, owned by a friend of Wilkie's father. He disliked clerical work, but worked for the company for more than five years.

Collins started writing and published his first story, "The Last Stage Coachman", in the Illuminated Magazine in August 1843. In 1844 he travelled to Paris with Charles Ward. That same year he wrote his first novel, Iolani, or Tahiti as It Was; a Romance, which was submitted to Chapman and Hall but rejected in 1845. The novel remained unpublished during his lifetime. Collins said of it: "My youthful imagination ran riot among the noble savages, in scenes which caused the respectable British publisher to declare that it was impossible to put his name on the title page of such a novel." While Collins was writing this novel, his father first learned that his son would not follow him in becoming a painter.

William Collins had intended his first son to become a clergyman and was disappointed in Wilkie's lack of interest in the profession. At his father's insistence, Collins instead entered Lincoln's Inn in 1846, to study law; his father wanted him to have a steady income. Collins showed only a slight interest in law and spent most of his time with friends and on working on a second novel, Antonina, or the Fall of Rome. After his father's death in 1847, Collins produced his first published book, Memoirs of the Life of William Collins, published in 1848.

The family moved to 38 Blandford Square soon afterwards, where they used their drawing room for amateur theatricals. In 1849, Collins exhibited a painting, The Smugglers' Retreat, at the Royal Academy summer exhibition. Antonina was published by Richard Bentley in February 1850. Collins went on a walking tour of Cornwall with artist Henry Brandling in July and August 1850. Collins wrote an account of their travels, which Brandling illustrated. Collins managed to complete his legal studies and was called to the bar in 1851. Though he never formally practised, he used his legal knowledge in many of his novels.

== Early writing career ==
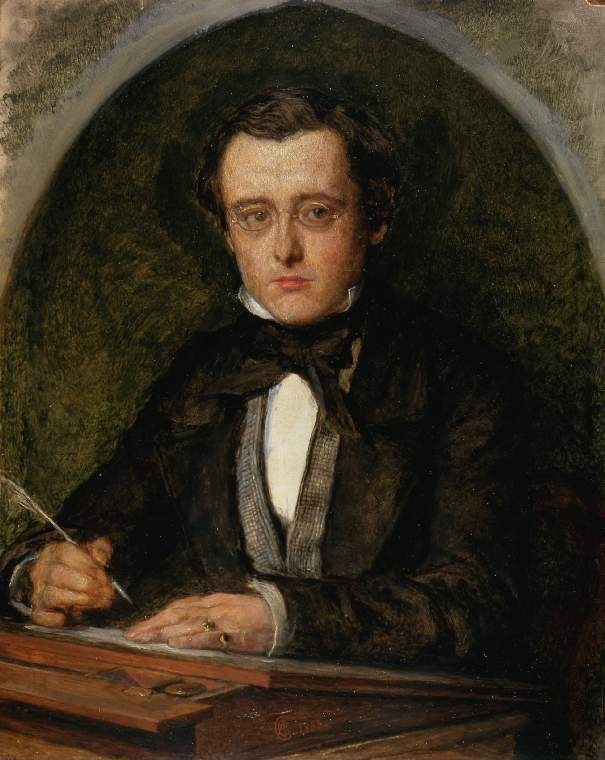
Portrait by Charles Allston Collins, 1853

An instrumental event in his career was an introduction in March 1851 to Charles Dickens by their friend in common, the painter Augustus Egg. They became lifelong friends and collaborators. In May of that year, Collins acted with Dickens in Edward Bulwer-Lytton's play Not So Bad As We Seem. Among the audience were Queen Victoria and Prince Albert. Collins's story "A Terribly Strange Bed", his first contribution to Dickens's journal Household Words, was published in April 1852. In May 1852 he went on tour with Dickens's company of amateur actors, again performing Not So Bad As We Seem, but with a more substantial role.

Collins's novel Basil was published by Bentley in November. During the writing of Hide and Seek, in early 1853, Collins suffered what was probably his first attack of gout, a condition from which he would suffer for the rest of his life. He was ill from April to early July. After that he stayed with Dickens in Boulogne from July to September 1853, then toured Switzerland and Italy with Dickens and Egg from October to December. Collins published Hide and Seek in June 1854.

During this period Collins extended the variety of his writing, publishing articles in George Henry Lewes's paper The Leader, short stories and essays for Bentley's Miscellany, as well as dramatic criticism and the travel book Rambles Beyond Railways (1851). His first play, The Lighthouse, was performed by Dickens's theatrical company at Tavistock House, in 1855. His first collection of short stories, After Dark, was published by Smith, Elder in February 1856. His novel A Rogue's Life was serialised in Household Words in March 1856. Around then, Collins began using laudanum regularly to treat his gout. He became addicted and struggled with that problem later in life.

Collins joined the staff of Household Words in October 1856. In 1856–57 he collaborated closely with Dickens on a play, The Frozen Deep, first performed in Tavistock. Collins's novel The Dead Secret was serialised in Household Words from January to June 1857, before being published in volume form by Bradbury and Evans. Collins's play The Lighthouse was performed at the Olympic Theatre in August. His account, The Lazy Tour of Two Idle Apprentices, based on Dickens's and Collins's walking tour in the north of England, was serialised in Household Words in October 1857. In 1858 Collins collaborated with Dickens and other writers on the story "A House to Let".

== 1860s ==
According to Collins's biographer Melisa Klimaszewski,

The novels Collins published in the 1860s are the best and most enduring of his career. The Woman in White, No Name, Armadale, and The Moonstone, written in less than a decade, show Collins not just as a master of his craft, but as an innovator and provocateur. These four works, which secured him an international reputation, and sold in large numbers, ensured his financial stability, and allowed him to support many others.

The Woman in White was serialised in All the Year Round from November 1859 to August 1860 to great success. The novel was published in book form soon after and reached an eighth edition by November 1860. His rising success as a writer allowed Collins to resign his post with All the Year Round in 1862 and focus on his novels. While planning his next novel, No Name, he continued to suffer from gout, which began to affect his eyes. Serial publication of No Name began in early 1862 and finished in 1863. By that time Collins was having difficulty controlling the amount of laudanum he was taking for his continual gout and became addicted.

At the beginning of 1863, he travelled with Caroline Graves to German spas and Italy for his health. In 1864, he began work on his novel Armadale, travelling in August to the Norfolk Broads and the village of Winterton-on-Sea to do research for it. It was published serially in The Cornhill Magazine in 1864–1866.

His play No Thoroughfare, co-written with Dickens, was published as the 1867 Christmas number of All the Year Round and dramatised at the Adelphi Theatre in the West End on 26 December. It enjoyed a run of 200 nights before being taken on tour. The Moonstone was serialised in All the Year Round from January to August 1868. His mother, Harriet Collins, died in that year.

== Later years ==
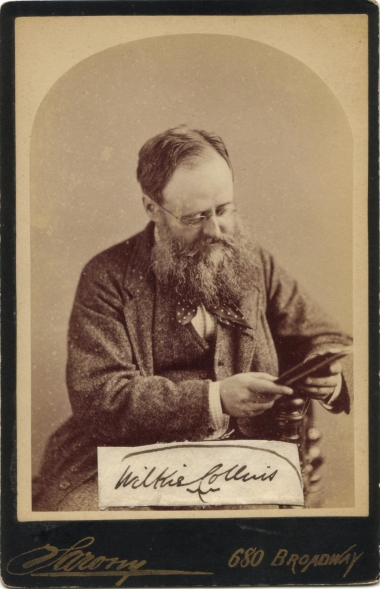
Photograph of Collins by Napoleon Sarony, 1874

In 1870, Collins' novel Man and Wife was published. That year Charles Dickens died, which caused him great sadness. He said of the friends' early days together, "We saw each other every day, and were as fond of each other as men could be."

The Woman in White was dramatised and produced at the Olympic Theatre in October 1871. Collins's novel Poor Miss Finch was serialised in Cassell's Magazine from October to March 1872. His short novel Miss or Mrs.? was published in the 1871 Christmas number of the Graphic. His novel The New Magdalen was serialised from October 1872 to July 1873. His younger brother, Charles Allston Collins, died later in 1873 at the age of 45. Charles had married Dickens's younger daughter, Kate.

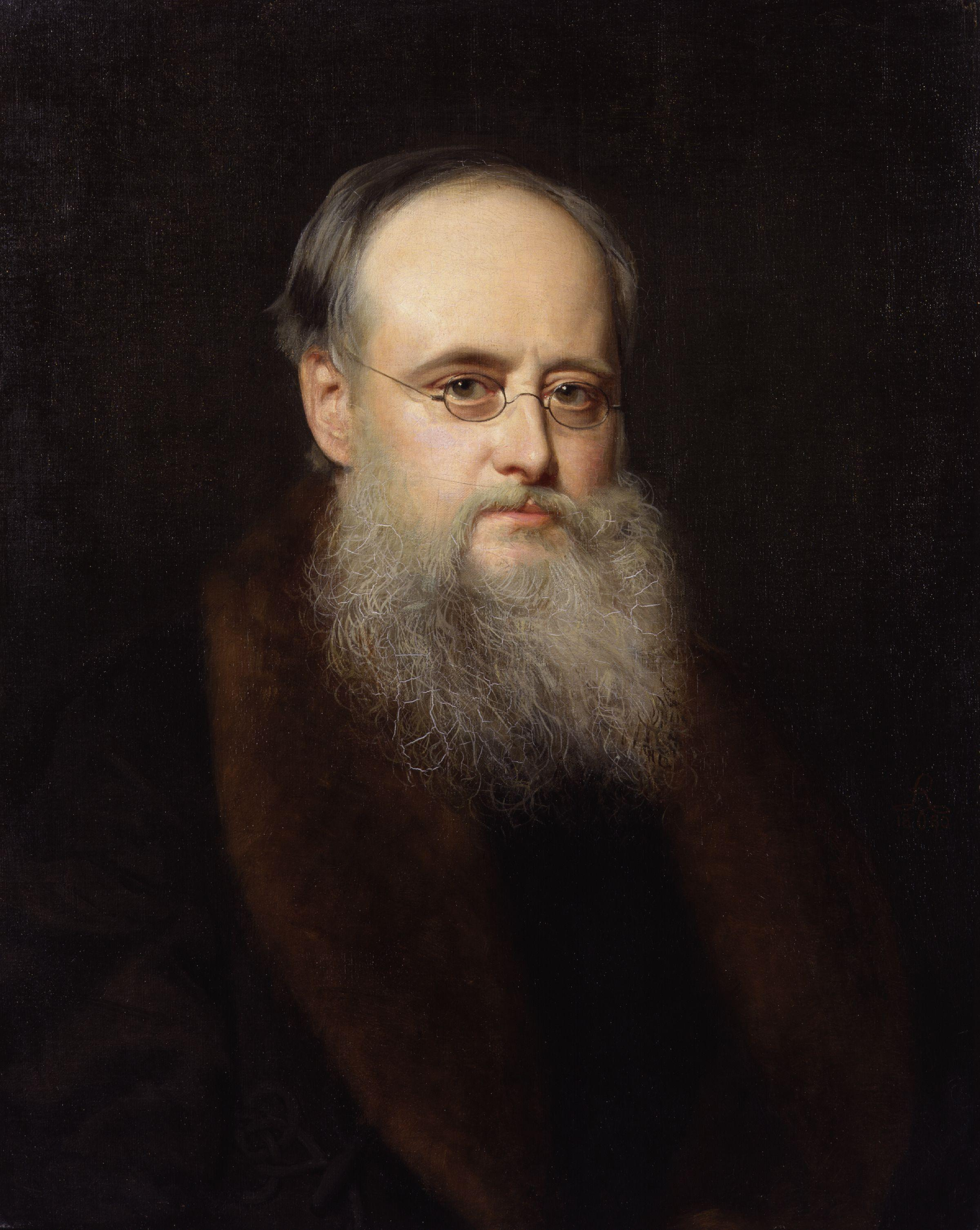
Portrait by Rudolph Lehmann, 1880

In 1873–74, Collins toured the United States and Canada, giving readings of his work. The American writers he met included Oliver Wendell Holmes Sr., and Mark Twain. He began a friendship with photographer Napoleon Sarony, who took several portraits of him.

His novel The Law and the Lady, serialised in the Graphic from September to March 1875, was followed by a short novel, The Haunted Hotel, which was serialised from June to November 1878. His later novels include Jezebel's Daughter (1880), The Black Robe (1881), Heart and Science (1883), and The Evil Genius (1886). In 1884, Collins was elected vice-president of the Society of Authors, which had been founded by his friend and fellow novelist Walter Besant.

The inconsistent quality of Collins's dramatic and fictional works in the last decade of his life was accompanied by a general decline in his health, including diminished eyesight. He was often unable to leave home and had difficulty writing. During these last years, he focused on mentoring younger writers, including the novelist Hall Caine. He also used his legal background to help protect other writers from copyright infringement of their works. His writing became a way for him to fight his illness without allowing it to keep him bedridden. His step-daughter Harriet also served as an amanuensis for several years. His last novel, Blind Love, was finished posthumously by Walter Besant.

== Personal life ==
In 1858 Collins began living with Caroline Graves and her daughter Harriet. Caroline came from a humble family, having married young, had a child, and been widowed. Collins lived close to the small shop kept by Caroline, and the two may have met in the neighbourhood in the mid-1850s. He treated Harriet, whom he called Carrie, as his own daughter, and helped to provide for her education. Excepting one short separation, they lived together for the rest of Collins's life. Collins disliked the institution of marriage, but remained dedicated to Caroline and Harriet, considering them to be his family.

Caroline had wanted to marry Collins. She left him while he wrote The Moonstone when he was suffering an attack of acute gout. She married a younger man named Joseph Clow, but after two years, she returned to Collins.

In 1868, Collins met Martha Rudd in Winterton-on-Sea in Norfolk, and the two began a liaison. She was 19 years old and from a large, poor family. A few years later, she moved to London to be closer to him. Their daughter Marian was born in 1869; their second daughter, Harriet Constance, in 1871; and their son, William Charles, in 1874. When he was with Martha, Collins assumed the name William Dawson, and she and their children used the last name of Dawson themselves.

For the last 20 years of his life Collins divided his time between Caroline, who lived with him at his home in Gloucester Place, and Martha, who was nearby.

Collins was a professing Christian.

== Death ==
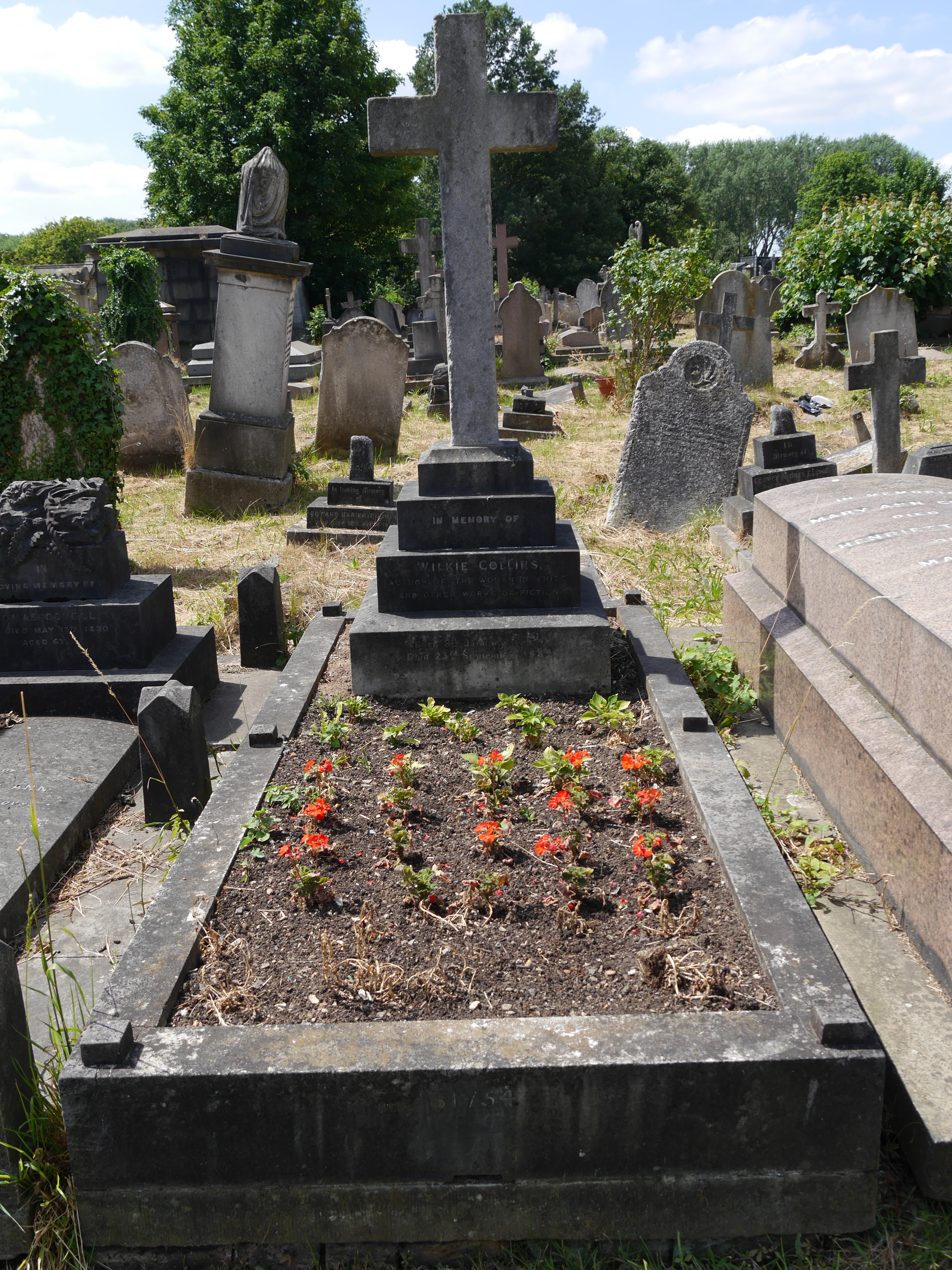
Monument, Kensal Green Cemetery

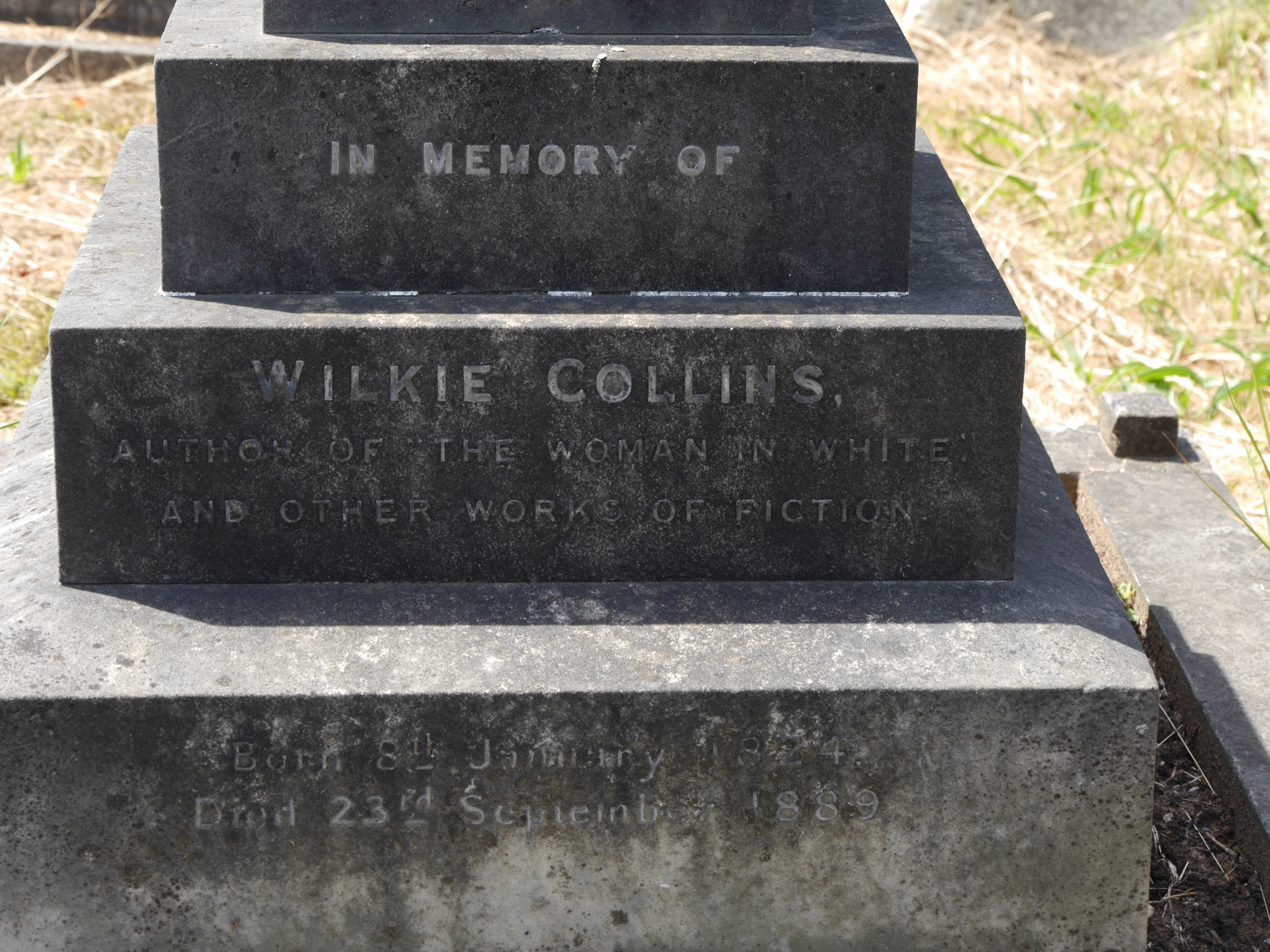
Monument detail, Kensal Green Cemetery

Collins died on 23 September 1889, at 65 Wimpole Street, following a paralytic stroke. He is buried in Kensal Green Cemetery, West London. His headstone describes him as the author of The Woman in White. Caroline Graves died in 1895 and was buried with Collins. Martha Rudd died in 1919.

== Works ==
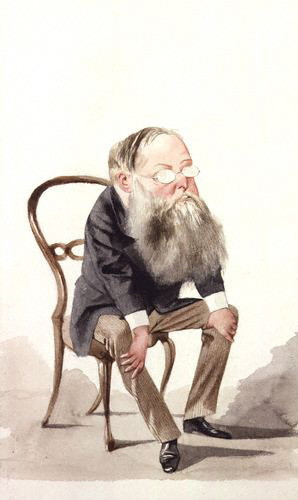
Captioned "The Novelist who invented Sensation", caricature of Wilkie Collins in Vanity Fair, 3 February 1872

Collins's works were classified at the time as sensation novels, a genre that became the precursor to detective and suspense fiction. He also wrote penetratingly on the plight of women and on the social and domestic issues of his time. For example, his 1854 Hide and Seek contained one of the first portrayals of a deaf character in English literature. As did many writers of his time, Collins first published most of his novels as serials in magazines such as Dickens's All the Year Round, and was known as a master of the form, creating just the right degree of suspense to keep his audience reading from week to week.

The Lighthouse was a melodrama loosely based on Collins's 1853 short story, "Gabriel's Marriage", but set in Eddystone Lighthouse in December 1748. In May 1855, Collins sent the finished play to Dickens, who enthusiastically took over the production. Dickens played Aaron Gurnock, the head lightkeeper, and arranged for Clarkson Stanfield to paint the backdrop. Other parts were taken by Collins, Augustus Egg, Mark Lemon, Mary Dickens and Georgina Hogarth. The production ran for four nights at Tavistock House, from 16 June 1855, followed by a single performance on 10 July at Campden House, Kensington. It was staged at the Royal Olympic Theatre from 10 August to 17 October 1857, as Collins's first professional production. Robson played Aaron Gurnock and George Vining read the Prologue. An American version opened at the New Theatre, New York, on 21 January 1858. There was an amateur production with Palgrave Simpson on 3 May 1865 at the Royal Bijou Theatre (Lambeth School of Art) and further revivals at Shelley's Boscombe Theatre in the 1870s and 1880s. The Lighthouse was translated into French by Emile Forgues.

Collins enjoyed ten years of success after publishing The Woman in White in 1859. His next novel, No Name combined social commentary – the absurdity of the law as applied to children of unmarried parents (see Illegitimacy in fiction) – with a densely plotted revenge thriller. Armadale, the first and only one of Collins's major novels of the 1860s to be serialised in a magazine other than All the Year Round, provoked strong criticism. Reviewers found its villainess Lydia Gwilt to be doubtful, and were further provoked by Collins's typically confrontational preface. The novel was simultaneously a financial coup for its author and a comparative commercial failure: the sum paid by Cornhill for the serialisation rights was exceptional, eclipsing by a substantial margin the prices paid for the vast majority of similar novels, yet the novel failed to recoup its publisher's investment.

The Moonstone, published in 1868, and the last novel of what is generally regarded as the most successful decade of Collins' author's career, was, despite a somewhat cool reception from both Dickens and the critics, a significant return to form. It re-established the market value of an author whose success on the competitive Victorian literary market had been waning in the wake of his first perceived masterpiece. Viewed by many as the advent of the detective story within the tradition of the English novel, The Moonstone remains one of Collins's most acclaimed works. It was described later by T. S. Eliot as "the first, the longest, and the best of modern English detective novels... in a genre invented by Collins and not by Poe." The mystery writer Dorothy L. Sayers later referred to it as "probably the very finest detective story ever written".

After The Moonstone, Collins's novels contained fewer thriller elements and more social commentary. The subject matter continued to be sensational, but his popularity declined. The poet Algernon Charles Swinburne commented: "What brought good Wilkie's genius nigh perdition? / Some demon whispered—'Wilkie! have a mission.'" Factors most often cited in Collins's decline have been the death of Dickens in 1870 and with it the loss of his literary mentoring, Collins's increased dependence upon laudanum, and his penchant for using his fiction to rail against social injustices.

The Woman in White and The Moonstone share an unusual narrative structure, somewhat resembling an epistolary novel, in which different portions of the book have different narrators, each with a distinct narrative voice. Armadale has this to a lesser extent through the correspondence between some characters.

== Notable works ==
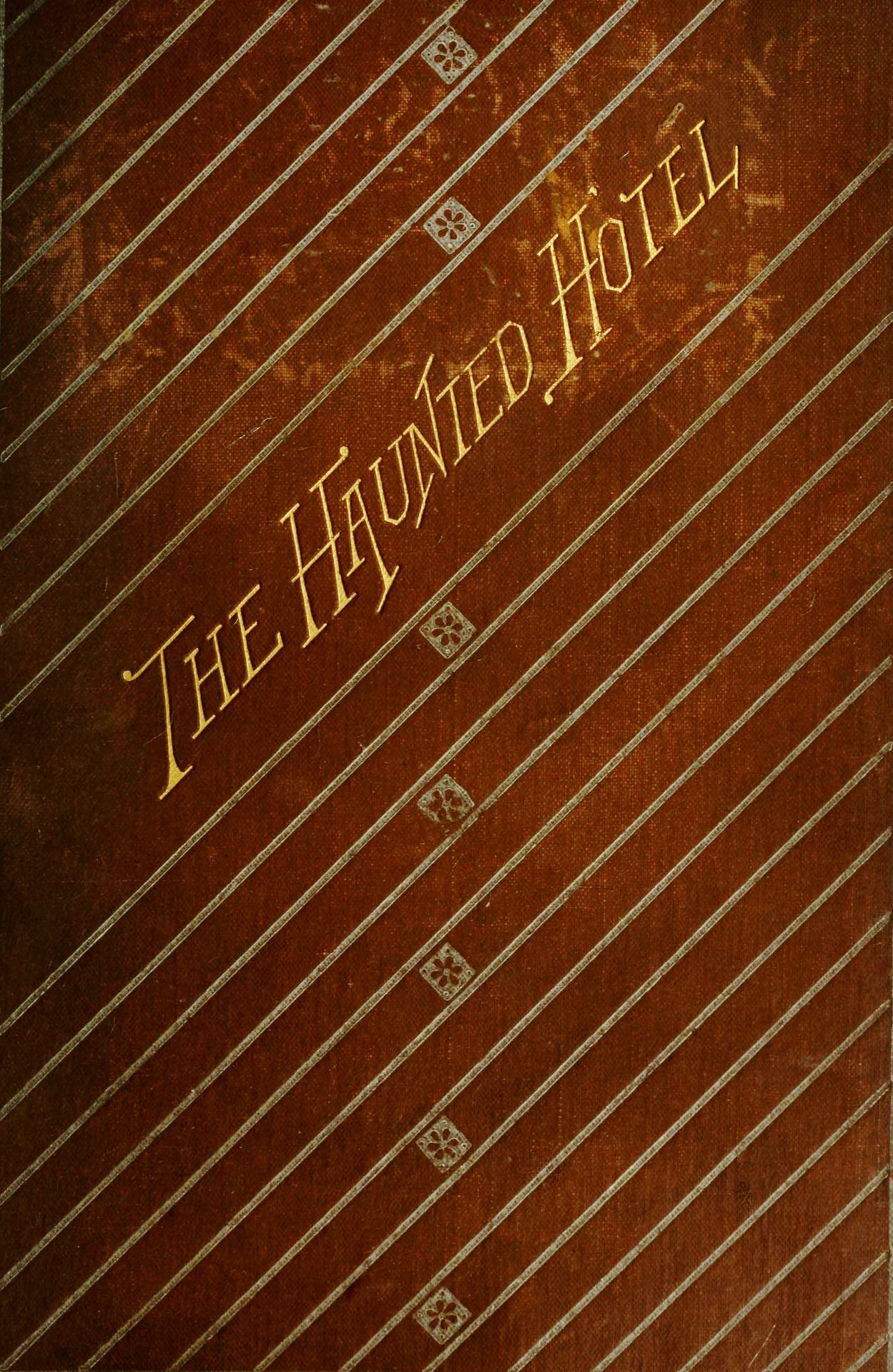
Cover of the first edition of The Haunted Hotel by Wilkie Collins, 1879

- Antonina, or The Fall of Rome (1850)
- Basil (1852)
- Gabriel's Marriage (1853), short story
- Hide and Seek (1854)
- The Dead Secret (1856)
- After Dark (1856), short story collection
- The Frozen Deep (1857), play co-written with Charles Dickens
- A House to Let (1858), short story co-written with Charles Dickens, Elizabeth Gaskell and Adelaide Anne Procter
- The Queen of Hearts (1859)
- The Haunted House, short story co-written with Charles Dickens, Elizabeth Gaskell, Adelaide Anne Proctor, George Sala and Hesba Stretton
- The Woman in White (1860)
- No Name (1862)
- Armadale (1866)
- No Thoroughfare (1867), story and play co-written with Charles Dickens
- The Moonstone (1868)
- Man and Wife (1870)
- Poor Miss Finch (1872), dedicated to Frances Minto Elliot
- The Law and the Lady (1875)
- The Two Destinies (1876)
- The Haunted Hotel (1878)
- The Fallen Leaves (1879)
- Jezebel's Daughter (1880)
- The Black Robe (1881)
- Heart and Science (1882–1883)
- The Evil Genius (1885)

=== Screen adaptations ===
- The Woman in White (silent, UK, 1929)
- The Moonstone (1934)
- The Woman in White (US, 1948)
- The Moonstone (UK, seven episodes, 1959)
- The Woman in White (West Germany, miniseries, three episodes, 1971, under the German title Die Frau in Weiß)
- The Woman in White (USSR, two episodes, 1981, under the Russian title 'Zhenshchina v belom')
- The Woman In White (1982 TV series, UK, five episodes, 1982)
- The Woman in White (1997 TV series, The Woman in White, UK, 1997)
- Basil (1998)
- The Moonstone (UK, five episodes, 2016)
- The Woman in White (UK, five episodes, 2018)

== See also ==
- Illegitimacy in fiction
