= Armadale (novel) =

1866 novel by Wilkie Collins

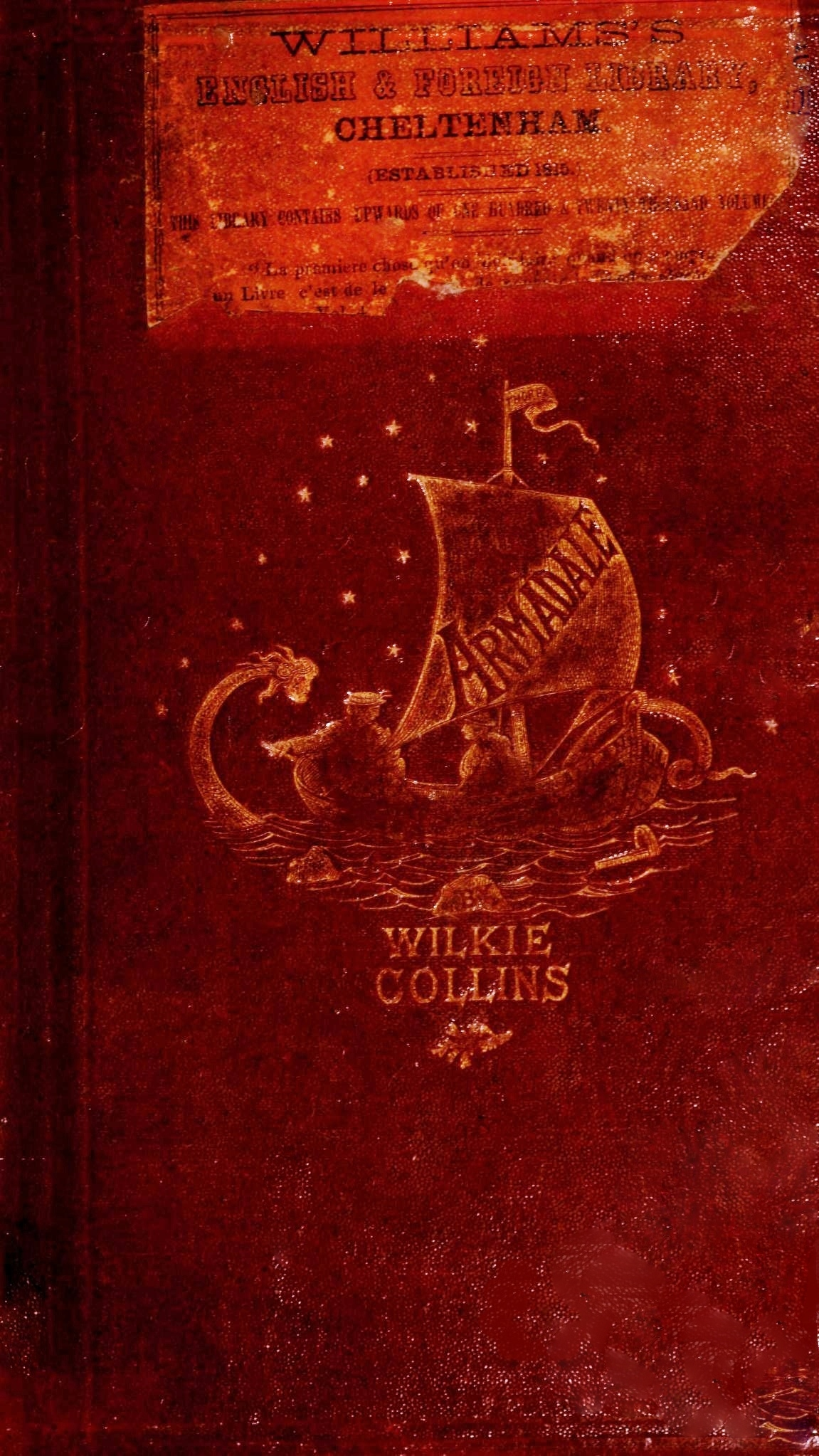
- First edition cover
- Author: Wilkie Collins
- Language: English
- Genre: Mystery novel, sensation novel
- Publisher: Cornhill Magazine
- Publication date: November 1864 -- June 1866
- Publication place: England
- Media type: Print (hardback & paperback)
- Preceded by: My Miscellanies
- Followed by: No Thoroughfare

Armadale is a novel by Wilkie Collins, first serialised between November 1864 and June 1866, and then published in book form in 1866. It is the third of his four 'great novels' of the 1860s: after The Woman in White (1860) and No Name (1862), and before The Moonstone (1868).

== Plot summary ==
In the German spa town of Wildbad, the 'Scotchman' Mr. Neal is asked to transcribe the deathbed confession of Allan Armadale; his story concerns his murder of the man he had disinherited (also called Allan Armadale), who had subsequently married the woman he was betrothed to under false pretences. Under Armadale's instructions, the confession is left to be opened by his son once he comes of age.

Nineteen years later, the son of the murdered man, also named Allan Armadale, rescues a man of his own age, Ozias Midwinter. The stranger reveals himself to the Reverend Decimus Brock (a friend of Allan through his late mother) to be another Allan Armadale, the son of the man who committed the murder. Midwinter tells the Rev. Brock of his desperate upbringing, having run away from his mother and stepfather, Mr. Neal. The Rev. Brock promises not to disclose the relationship between the young men, who become close companions. Midwinter remains haunted by a fear that he will harm Armadale as a result of their proximity, a fate warned of in his father's letter. This feeling intensifies when the pair spend a night on a shipwreck off the Isle of Man—the very ship on which the murder was committed. On the vessel, Armadale has a mysterious dream involving three people; Midwinter believes that the events are a prophecy of the future.

Members of Armadale’s family die in mysterious circumstances. As a result, Armadale inherits the estate of Thorpe-Ambrose in Norfolk and relocates there with Midwinter, intending to make him his steward. Once there, Armadale falls in love with Miss Eleanor Milroy, the sixteen-year-old daughter of Major Milroy, to whom he has rented a cottage. Meanwhile, Miss Lydia Gwilt, the villainess of the novel, plots with Mrs. Maria Oldershaw for Miss Gwilt to marry Armadale and become the lady of Thorpe-Ambrose, as a means of enriching herself and achieving retribution for his family's apparent wrongdoings.

The colourful portrayal of the beautiful Lydia Gwilt takes up much of the rest of the story. Originally Armadale’s mother's maid, and a contributor to the conflict between Armadale’s and Midwinter's fathers, she is a fortune hunter and a poisoner. Unable to alienate Armadale’s affections from Miss Milroy, she next decides to marry Midwinter under his real name, which she has discovered is also Allan Armadale; she then plots to murder the wealthy Armadale, or have him killed by her ex-lover, a Cuban desperado; as the legal "Mrs. Allan Armadale", she plans to claim to be his widow, and the owner of Thorpe-Ambrose. However, Armadale escapes the desperado's attempt on his life—he is supposed to have drowned in a shipwreck—and returns to England. Lydia Gwilt's plans are thus foiled.

Her final plan is to murder Armadale herself, using poison gas, at the sanatorium run by a quack called Doctor Downward, but she is thwarted by her own conscience: Midwinter and Armadale have switched rooms, and she cannot bring herself to murder her true husband, for whom she has genuine feelings of love. After rescuing Midwinter and writing him a farewell note, she goes into the air-poisoned room and kills herself. Armadale marries Miss Milroy, and Midwinter, still his best friend, becomes a writer.

Some linking passages consist of letters between the various characters, or of extracts from Lydia Gwilt's diary, but the great majority of the text narrates the events as they occur. The novel is enlivened by many minor characters including Mr. Bashwood, an old failure of a clerk who is infatuated with Lydia Gwilt; his son, James "Jemmy" Bashwood, a private detective; Mrs. Oldershaw, an unscrupulous associate of Miss Gwilt’s; the Pedgifts (father and son), Armadale’s lawyers; and the Rev. Decimus Brock, a shrewd (but not quite shrewd enough) clergyman who brings Armadale up, but is absent for much of the book.

== Analysis ==
The question of whether the story is to be interpreted rationally or superstitiously, as Midwinter does, is never resolved.

Catherine Peters writes in an introduction to the book that "The distortions of the plot, the violent and irrational reactions of the characters, reflect and dramatise the ways in which his readers’ perceptions were distorted by the assumptions and hypocrisies of the society in which they lived."

== Adaptations ==
In the same year that it finished its serial publication, Collins wrote a dramatic version of Armadale in order to protect his rights to later stage the novel.

A play by Jeffrey Hatcher based on the novel premiered on 23 April 2008 at the Milwaukee Repertory Theater.

BBC Radio 4 broadcast a three-part adaptation by Robin Brooks of the novel between Sunday 7 and Sunday 21 June 2009. The cast was Lydia, Lucy Robinson; Allan, Alex Robertson; Midwinter, Ray Fearon; Neelie, Perdita Avery; Bashwood, Richard Durden; Downward, Geoffrey Whitehead; James 'Jemmy' Bashwood, Grant Gillespie; Vincent, Robin Brooks.

In this adaptation, Lydia Gwilt is the narrator, and her character is emphasised rather than Midwinter's forebodings.

== Characters ==
- Allan Armadale
- Ozias Midwinter (legal name Allan Armadale) – his friend
- Lydia Gwilt – forger and laudanum addict, the anti-heroine of the novel
- The Reverend Decimus Brock – a minister and friend of Alan Armadale and Ozias Midwinter. He is a correspondent of Ozias Midwinter and privy to his secret
- Mrs Maria Oldershaw – owner of the Ladies' Toilet Repository and Lydia Gwilt's co-conspirator
- Allan Armadale (1st) – father of Allan Armadale (2nd)
- Allan Armadale (2nd) alias Fergus Ingleby – son of Allan Armadale (1st) and father of the main character Allan Armadale
- Allan Armadale (3rd) (formerly Allan Wrentmore) – father of Ozias Midwinter and murderer of Allan Armadale (2nd)
- Mr. Neal – stepfather to Ozias Midwinter
- Mr. Bashwood – Lydia Gwilt's admirer and Allan Armadale's steward
- Miss Eleanor (Neelie) Milroy – resident of Thorpe-Ambrose and neighbour to Allan Armadale, later to be Armadale's fiancée
- Augustus Pedgift Sr. – lawyer and adviser to Allan Armadale
- Augustus Pedgift Jr. – Pedgift's son, a junior lawyer and friend to Allan Armadale
- Dr. Downward – criminal associate of Mrs. Oldershaw, later the founder & operator of Friendvale Sanatorium under the alias Dr. Le Doux
- Captain Manuel – one of Lydia Gwilt's former lovers

== Publication history ==
Armadale first appeared as a serialisation in the Cornhill Magazine, issued in twenty monthly instalments from November 1864 to June 1866. It was serialised almost concurrently in the United States, appearing in Harper's New Monthly Magazine between December 1864 and July 1866. It first appeared in book form in May 1866 (Smith, Elder & Co., two volumes).
