= No Name (novel) =

1862 novel by Wilkie Collins

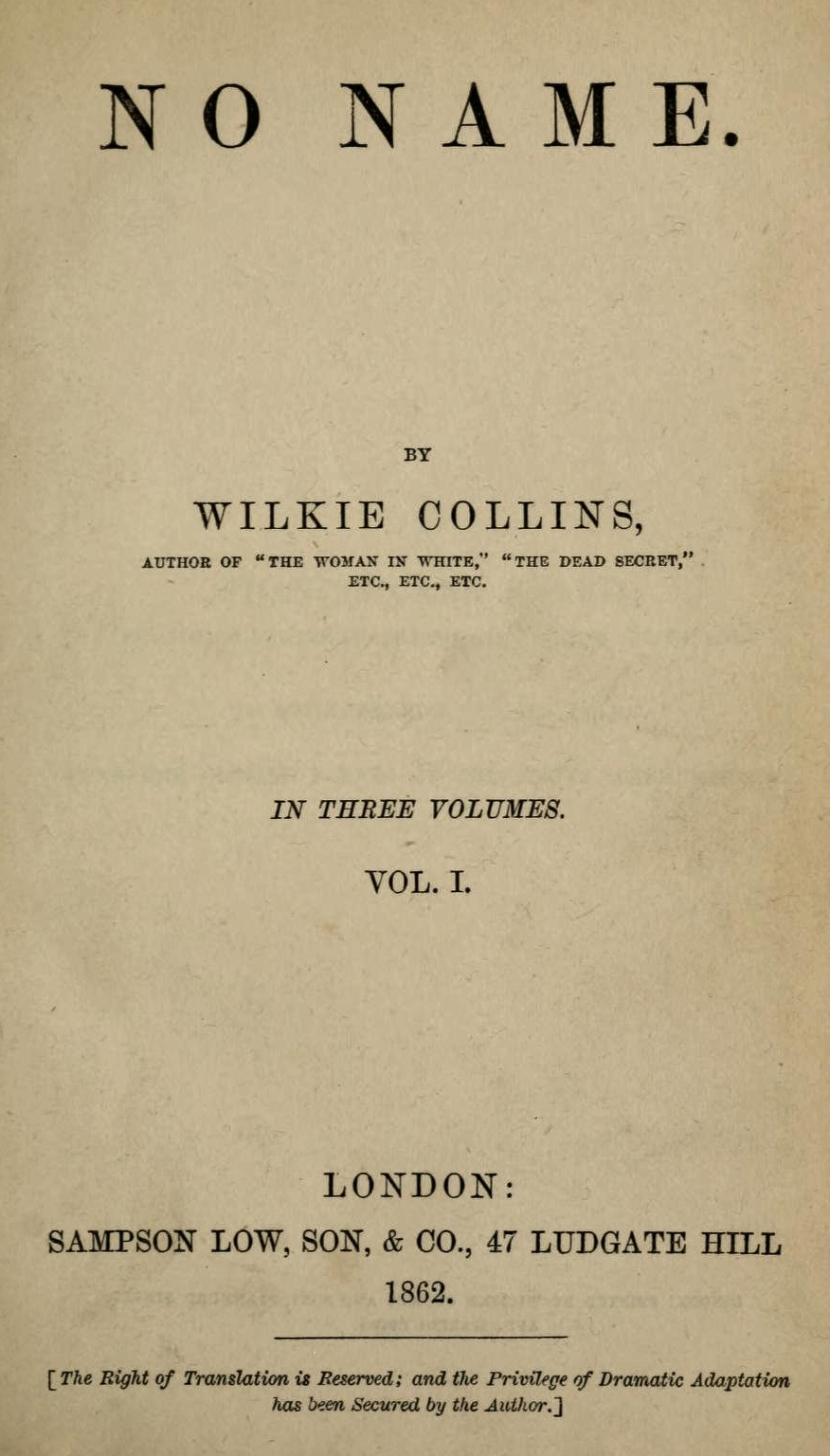
- First edition title page
- Author: Wilkie Collins
- Language: English
- Genre: Mystery novel, sensation novel
- Publisher: Sampson Low, Son, and Marston
- Publication date: 21 December 1862
- Publication place: United Kingdom
- Media type: Print (hardback & paperback)
- Preceded by: The Woman in White
- Followed by: Armadale

No Name is an 1862 novel by Wilkie Collins. Illegitimacy is a major theme of the novel. It was originally serialised in Charles Dickens's magazine All the Year Round before book publication. It is the second of his four "great novels", released after The Woman in White (1860) and before Armadale (1866) and The Moonstone (1868).

== Plot summary ==
The story is told in eight major parts, called Scenes.

Scene One begins in 1846, at Combe-Raven in West Somerset, the country residence of the wealthy Vanstone family: Andrew Vanstone, his wife, and their two daughters. Norah, age 26, is happy and quiet; Magdalen, 18, is beautiful but volatile and wilful. The family lives in peace and contentment, with the girls' former governess, Miss Garth.

Through amateur theatricals, Magdalen discovers she is a talented actress. She falls in love with Frank Clare, who is also in the play. Frank, the idle but handsome son of a neighbour, has reluctantly tried to pursue a career but failed, and his father is not wealthy. However, the young couple wish to marry and Magdalen's fortune will easily support them.

Their fathers agree to the marriage, but before it takes place Mr. Vanstone is killed in a train crash and Mrs. Vanstone dies in childbirth. The family lawyer, Mr. Pendril, tells Norah and Magdalen that despite appearances their parents had only been married for a few months, and their wedding invalidated Mr. Vanstone's will leaving everything to the daughters.

Since the daughters are illegitimate, they have no name, no rights, and no property. Combe-Raven and the entire family fortune are inherited by Andrew's older brother, Michael Vanstone, who has been bitterly estranged from the family for many years. He refuses to provide any support for the orphaned young women. With the help only of Miss Garth, they set out to make their own way in the world.

Scene Two is set in York, where Magdalen is found by Captain Wragge, a distant relative of her mother's, who confesses that he is a professional swindler. He helps her in getting started on the stage in return for a share of the proceeds. His wife Matilda, whom he married for an expected inheritance, is physically huge and kindly but mentally slow; she has to be supervised like a child.

Scene Three is set in Vauxhall Walk, Lambeth. Magdalen, having earned some money, forsakes the stage and plots to get her inheritance back. Michael Vanstone has died; his only son Noel is sickly and looked after by his housekeeper, Virginie Lecount, a shrewd woman who hopes to inherit a large sum of his money. Magdalen goes to Lambeth and disguised as Miss Garth visits Noel to see how the land lies, but Mrs. Lecount sees through her disguise and cuts a bit of cloth from the hem of her brown alpaca dress as evidence of Magdalen's deception.

Scene Four is set in Aldborough, Suffolk, where Magdalen tries to carry out her plot to regain her inheritance by marrying Noel Vanstone under an assumed name, with Captain and Mrs. Wragge posing as her uncle and aunt. Captain Kirke, a sea captain, sees Magdalen and is smitten; she is privately annoyed by his attention to her. Wragge and Lecount plot against and attempt to outdo each other; in the end, Lecount is sent on a false errand to Zurich. Captain Wragge arranges Noel and Magdalen's marriage with the understanding that he will receive a payment promised by Magdalen and have no further contact with her afterwards.

Scene Five is set in Baliol Cottage, Dumfries. Noel is alone, as his wife has left to visit friends in London. Mrs. Lecount returns from Zurich and explains who his wife really is, with the help of the cut bit of cloth from the brown alpaca dress. Noel, at her direction, rewrites his will, disinheriting his wife and leaving a respectable legacy to Lecount and the remainder to Admiral Bartram, his cousin. Mrs. Lecount also induces Noel to write a Secret Trust to Admiral Bartram, directing that the money be passed to his nephew George Bartram, but only on the condition that he marries someone not a widow within six months. The stress of writing an angry letter denouncing his wife is too much for Noel, and he dies from a weak heart. The Secret Trust precludes Magdalen from marrying George in order to regain the inheritance.

Scene Six is set in St John's Wood where Magdalen has lodgings. Estranged from Norah and from Miss Garth, who she thinks betrayed her husband's whereabouts to Lecount, she conceives a plot to disguise herself as a parlour maid and infiltrate Admiral Bartram's house in order to search for the Secret Trust document. Her own maid, Louisa, trains her for this role in return for Magdalen's giving her the money to marry her fiancé, the father of her illegitimate child, and emigrate to Australia.

Scene Seven is set at St. Crux, the Bartram country house. Magdalen, serving as a parlour maid under Louisa's name for Admiral Bartram, searches through the house for the Secret Trust. Eventually she locates it by following Admiral Bartram as he sleepwalks, but she is discovered and secretly leaves the house before she can be discharged for being a thief. The admiral dies soon afterwards.

The last scene is set in a poor lodging house in Aaron's Buildings. Magdalen is ill and destitute, on the verge of being sent to a hospital or the workhouse, when a handsome man appears and rescues her. It is Captain Kirke, the sailor who had become enamored of her after seeing her once at Aldborough. Meanwhile, Norah has married George Bartram, thus inadvertently regaining half the Vanstone inheritance as his wife. The other half reverted to Magdalen as Noel's widow, because her dead husband never made a provision for George not marrying within six months, or for the admiral dying. Magdalen refuses the money, because she is trying to become a better person. Admiring the integrity of Norah and Captain Kirke, she confesses her disreputable past to him and affirms that she will live a life worthy of him henceforth. The novel ends with Kirke and Magdalen professing their mutual love.

== Characters ==
=== Major characters ===
- Magdalen Vanstone – the heroine; a headstrong young woman with dramatic talent, who is determined to regain her family's lost inheritance; aged 18 at the opening of the novel
- Norah Vanstone – Magdalen's elder sister by eight years
- Captain Horatio Wragge – an audacious, self-proclaimed swindler who is also the Vanstone sisters' uncle by their mother
- Noel Vanstone – Magdalen and Norah's first cousin; Michael Vanstone's son
- Mrs Lecount – Noel Vanstone's domineering housekeeper

=== Minor characters ===
- Andrew Vanstone – Magdalen and Norah's father
- Bertha Vanstone- Magdalen and Norah's mother
- Miss Harriet Garth – the Vanstone sisters' governess
- Francis Clare Sr. – the Vanstone family's cynical neighbour
- Francis (Frank) Clare Jr. – Magdalen Vanstone's beloved
- Mr Pendril – Andrew Vanstone's family lawyer
- Michael Vanstone – the Vanstone sisters' vindictive uncle; Noel Vanstone's father
- Matilda Wragge – Captain Horatio Wragge's wife; a giantess with the mind of a child
- Robert Kirke – a captain in the merchant service who falls in love with Magdalen
- Louisa – Magdalen's lady's maid during her betrothal and marriage
- Admiral Bartram – Noel Vanstone's cousin, into whose service Magdalen enters under an assumed name
- George Bartram – Admiral Bartram's nephew, who later marries Norah Vanstone
- Mr Merrick – a surgeon in general practice
- Mr, Mrs and Miss Marrable – a family living in Evergreen Lodge, Clifton, fond of "private theatricals"
- John Loscombe – Noel Vanstone's lawyer who also advises Mrs Lecount
- Mrs Drake – Admiral Bartram's housekeeper at St Crux-in-the-Marsh
- Mr Mazey – the "admiral's coxswain"; Admiral Bartram's elderly friend

== Genre ==
No Name is a typical example of the sensation novel, a genre of fiction which arose in Britain in the 1860s. The genre reflected anxieties had by the Victorian public about the uncertain stability of their situation; for example, the concern that a family's living could be removed by the vagaries of the law, death, or disease is reflected by the sudden change of fortune that Magdalen Vanstone has following the death of her father.

The plot of the novel begins with the death of Andrew Vanstone in a train crash, reflecting contemporary Victorian anxieties about the introduction of the railway. Journeys by train, and accidents occurring as a result of them, are a recurring theme throughout the canon of the sensation novel. A similar train accident occurs in Ellen Wood's East Lynne (1861).

== Theme ==
The character of Magdalen Vanstone is used by Collins to examine and critique gender stereotypes. She embodies both heroic and villainous qualities, being passionate but also somewhat histrionic, which was a contemporary Victorian negative stereotype of women. She is characterised as a pleasure-seeker, and her interest in acting is displayed as a representation of this. Her theatrical career is a representation of her ability to assume many different roles – an element which is used to examine society's views on women, and how social class and gender roles are ultimately determined by dress and bearing. Despite her scheming, however, she ultimately settles into the domestic life prescribed to Victorian women through her marriage to Robert Kirke.

== Adaptations ==
The book was dramatised as Great Temptation by Collins and Wybert Reeve, who played "Captain Wragge" to great effect.

In 2014, Jeffrey Hatcher adapted the novel for stage, initially at Carthage College before bringing the show to the Edinburgh Festival Fringe. Reviews stated that attempting to condense the complicated plot to a 90 minute show met with mixed results, although they complimented the production's comedy and wit.

The book has been adapted for radio. It was broadcast on BBC Radio 4 in six episodes, from 24 September to 29 October 1989 and repeated on BBC Radio 4 Extra beginning 4 March 2013, and again in October 2019 and September 2021.
