= The Woman in White (novel) =

1860 novel by Wilkie Collins

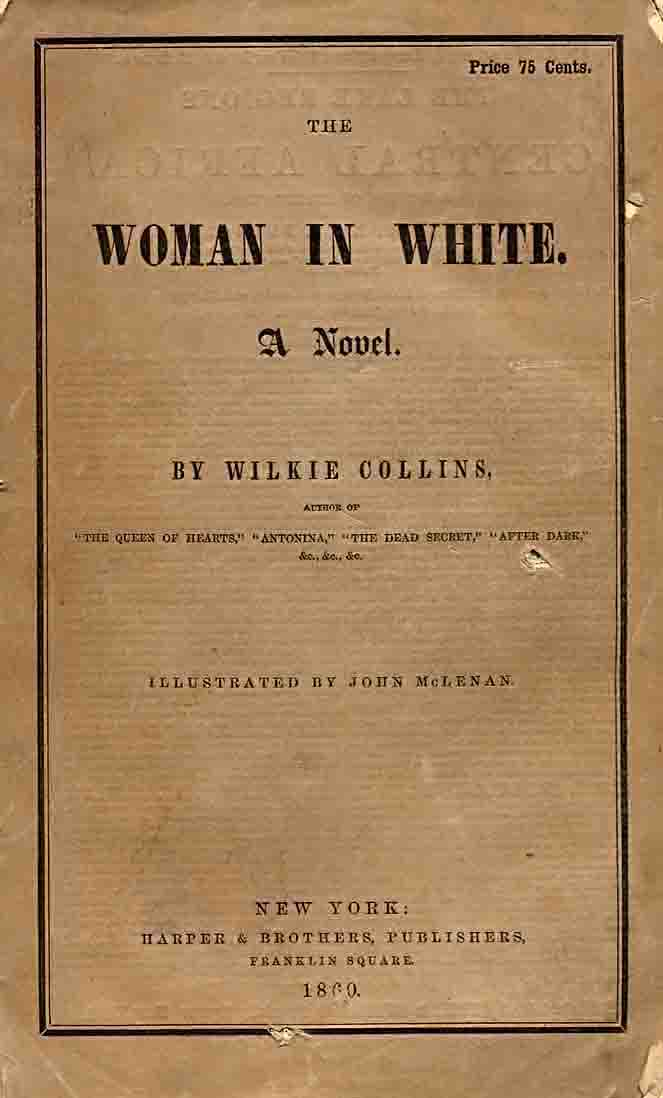
- Cover of first US edition
- Author: Wilkie Collins
- Language: English
- Genre: Gothic; horror; mystery; sensation novel
- Publisher: All the Year Round
- Publication date: 26 November 1859 – 25 August 1860
- Publication place: United Kingdom
- OCLC: 41545143
- Preceded by: The Dead Secret
- Followed by: No Name

The Woman in White is Wilkie Collins's fifth published novel, written in 1860 and set from 1849 to 1850. It started its publication on 26 November 1859 and its publication was completed on 25 August 1860. It is a mystery novel and falls under the genre of "sensation novels".

The story can be seen as an early example of detective fiction with many of the sleuthing techniques of protagonist Walter Hartright being employed by later private detectives. The use of multiple narrators (including nearly all the principal characters) draws on Collins's legal training, and as he points out in his preamble: "the story here presented will be told by more than one pen, as the story of an offence against the laws is told in Court by more than one witness". Collins also drew on memories of his father, the artist William Collins, in the creation of drawing master Walter Hartright, and populates his story with a number of Italian characters, likely inspired by the two years he spent in Italy during his childhood.

In 2003, Robert McCrum writing for The Observer listed The Woman in White number 23 in "the top 100 greatest novels of all time", and the novel was listed at number 77 on the BBC's survey The Big Read.

== Plot ==
Walter Hartright, a young art teacher, encounters and gives directions to a mysterious and distressed woman dressed entirely in white, lost in London; he later learns she has escaped from an asylum. Soon afterwards, he travels to Limmeridge House in Cumberland, having been hired as a drawing teacher on the recommendation of his friend, Pesca, an Italian language teacher. The Limmeridge household comprises the invalid Frederick Fairlie and Walter's students: Laura Fairlie, Mr. Fairlie's niece, and Marian Halcombe, her devoted half-sister. Walter realises that Laura bears an astonishing resemblance to the woman in white, who is known to the household by the name of Anne Catherick, a mentally disabled child who formerly lived near Limmeridge and was devoted to Laura's mother, who first dressed her in white.

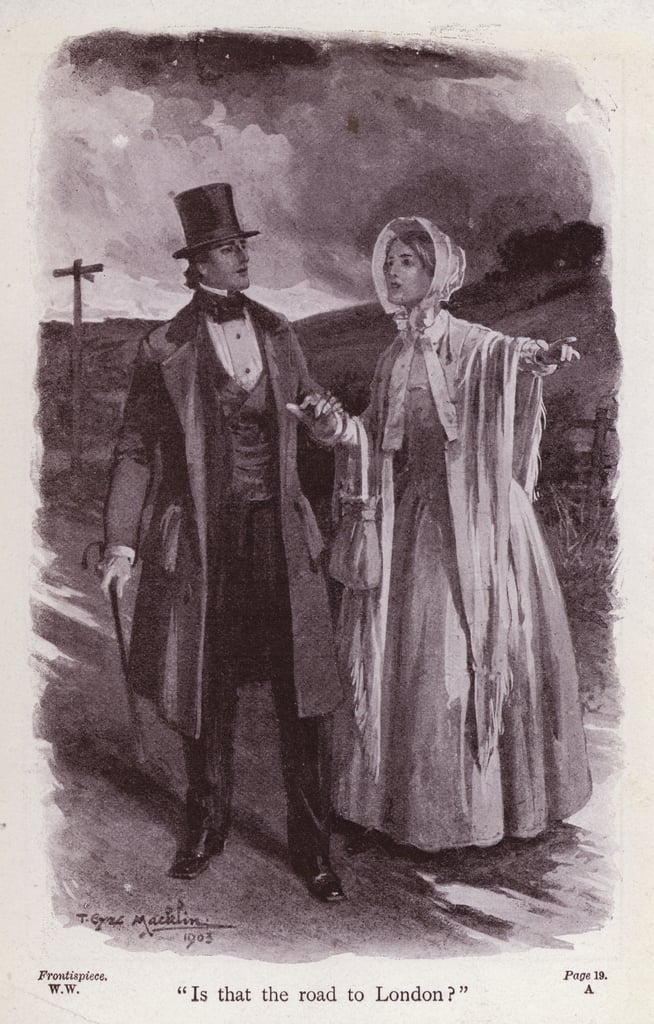
Walter Hartright's first encounter with 'The Woman in White'. Illustration by Thomas Eyre Macklin.

Over the next few months, Walter and Laura fall in love, despite Laura's betrothal to Sir Percival Glyde, Baronet. Upon realising this, Marian advises Walter to leave Limmeridge. Laura receives an anonymous letter warning her against marrying Sir Percival. Walter deduces that Anne has sent the letter and encounters her again in Cumberland; he becomes convinced that Sir Percival originally placed Anne in the asylum. Despite the misgivings of the family lawyer over the financial terms of the marriage settlement, which will give the entirety of Laura's fortune to Sir Percival if she dies without leaving an heir, and Laura's confession that she loves another man, Laura and Sir Percival marry in December 1849 and travel to Italy for six months. Concurrently, Walter joins an expedition to Honduras.

After six months, Sir Percival and Lady Glyde (Laura) return to his house, Blackwater Park in Hampshire; accompanied by Sir Percival's friend, Count Fosco (married to Laura's aunt). Marian, at Laura's request, lives at Blackwater and learns that Sir Percival is in financial difficulties. Sir Percival attempts to bully Laura into signing a document that would allow him to use her marriage settlement of £20,000, which Laura refuses to do. Anne, who is now terminally ill, travels to Blackwater Park and contacts Laura, saying that she holds a secret that will ruin Sir Percival's life. Before she can disclose the secret, Sir Percival discovers their communication, and believing Laura knows his secret, becomes extremely paranoid and attempts to keep her held at Blackwater. With the problem of Laura's refusal to give away her fortune and Anne's knowledge of his secret, Fosco conspires to use the resemblance between Laura and Anne to exchange their two identities. Sir Percival and Fosco will trick both individuals into travelling with them to London; Laura will be placed in an asylum under the identity of Anne, and Anne will be buried under the identity of Laura upon her imminent death. Marian overhears enough of the plan to understand they are conspiring against someone's life but not any of the details, but becomes soaked by rain in her hiding place and falls ill.

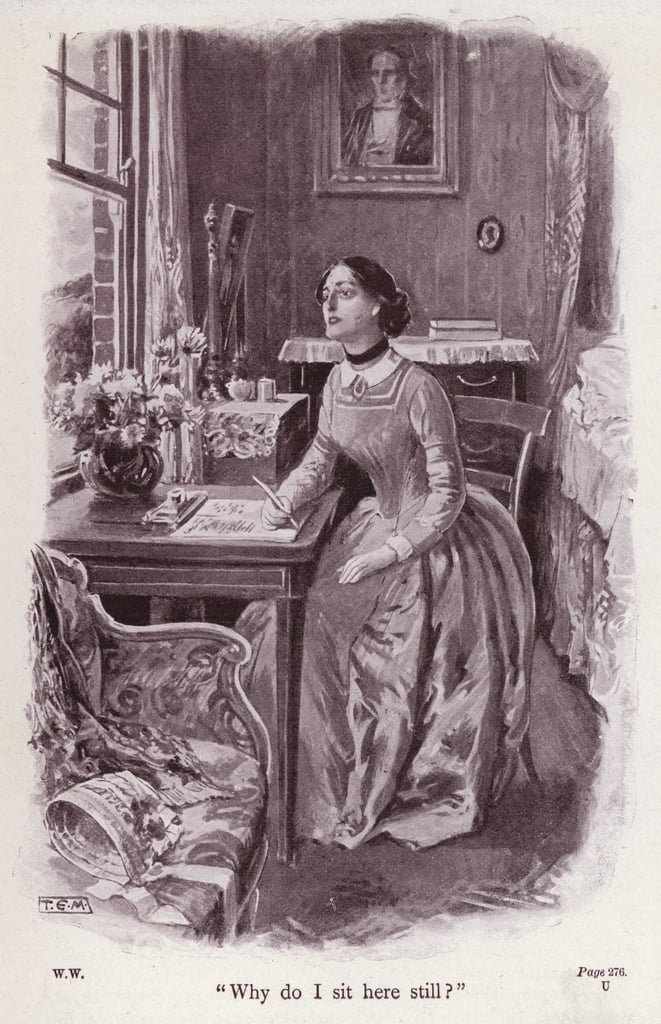
Marian Halcombe in deep contemplation on Laura's fate while she feels confined in her own sickroom. Illustration by Thomas Eyre Macklin.

While Marian is ill, Laura is tricked into travelling to London, and the identity switch is accomplished. Anne Catherick succumbs to her illness and is buried as Laura, while Laura is drugged and conveyed to the asylum as Anne. When Marian visits the asylum, hoping to learn something from Anne, she finds Laura, who has been treated by her attendants as a deluded Anne when she protests her true identity as Laura. Marian bribes the nurse, and Laura escapes. Meanwhile, Walter has returned from Honduras, and the three live incognito in London, making plans to restore Laura's identity. During his research, Walter discovers Sir Percival's secret: he is illegitimate, and therefore not entitled to his title or property. In the belief that Walter has discovered or will discover his secret, Sir Percival attempts to incinerate the incriminating document but perishes in the flames. From Anne's mother (Jane Catherick), Walter discovers that Anne never knew what Sir Percival's secret was. She had only known that there was a secret around Sir Percival and had repeated words her mother had said in anger to threaten Sir Percival. The truth was that Sir Percival's mother had already been married to an Irish man, who had left her, and had not been free to remarry. While he had no problem claiming the estate, Sir Percival had needed his parents' marriage certificate to borrow money. He therefore had gone to a church in the village where his parents had lived together, and had added a fake marriage record (of his parents) to the church register. Mrs. Catherick had helped him obtain access to the register and had been rewarded with a gold watch and an annual payment.

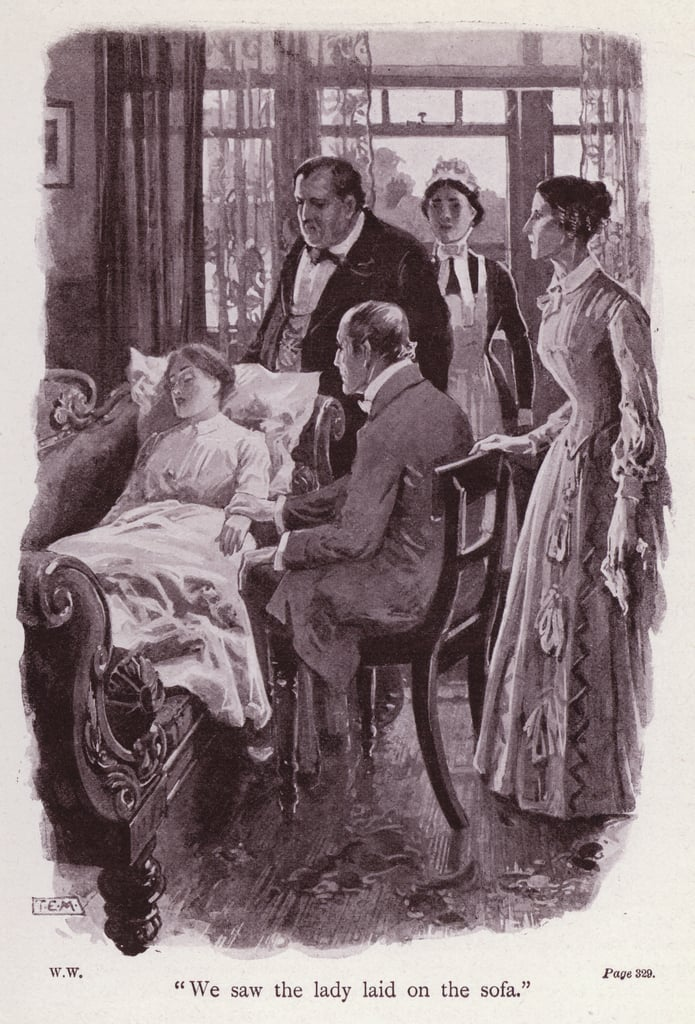
The 'Woman in White' lies helplessly on the sofa as if she was an invalid. Illustration by Thomas Eyre Macklin.

During the period of Sir Percival and Mrs. Catherick's relationship, a vestry-clerk from a nearby town had made regular visits to the church and had made a copy of the church's marriage register. This duplicate was kept safely in the vestry-clerk's office in town. Walter, knowing of the suspect entry in the original church register, now goes to the vestry-clerk's office, obtains the duplicate, and finds that no such entry exists in it, thus confirming the original register contained a fake entry.

With the death of Sir Percival in a fire while attempting to destroy the original register containing the faked entry, the trio is safe from persecution. But they still have no way of proving Laura's true identity. Walter suspects that Anne died before Laura's trip to London, and proof of this would prove their story, but only Fosco knows the dates. Walter works out from a letter he received from Mrs. Catherick's former employer that Anne was the illegitimate child of Laura's father, making her Laura's half-sister. On a visit to the opera with Pesca, he learns that Fosco has betrayed an Italian nationalist society, of which Pesca is a high-ranking member. When Fosco prepares to flee the country, Walter forces a written confession from him in exchange for safe passage from the United Kingdom. Laura's identity is legally restored, and her name on the gravestone is replaced by that of Anne Catherick. Fosco escapes, only to be killed in Paris by another agent of the society. To ensure the legitimacy of his efforts on her part, Walter and Laura have married earlier; upon the death of Frederick Fairlie, their infant son inherits Limmeridge.

== Characters ==
- Walter Hartright – A young teacher of drawing, something of an everyman character, and distinguished by a strong sense of justice.
- Frederick Fairlie – A wealthy hypochondriac land-owner: the uncle of Laura Fairlie, distinguished principally by his mock-politeness toward all other characters.
- Laura Fairlie – Mr. Fairlie's gentle, guileless, pretty niece: an heiress and orphan.
- Marian Halcombe – Laura's elder half-sister and companion; not attractive but intelligent and resourceful.
- Anne Catherick ("The Woman in White") – An unconventional young woman distinguished by her insistence on white clothes; an illegitimate daughter of Laura's father.
- Jane Catherick – Anne's unsympathetic mother; in league with Sir Percival Glyde in committing her daughter to the asylum. Depicted as an unpleasant character.
- Vincent Gilmore – Lawyer to the Fairlies and close friend.
- Sir Percival Glyde, Baronet – Laura's fiancé and then husband; able to appear charming and gracious when he wishes but often abrasive.
- Count Fosco – Sir Percival's closest friend; his full name is Isidor Ottavio Baldassare Fosco. A grossly fat Italian with a mysterious past: eccentric, bombastic, urbane but intelligent and menacing. He keeps canaries and mice as pets.
- Countess Fosco – Laura's aunt: once a giddy girl but now humourless and obedient to her husband.
- Professor Pesca – A teacher of Italian and good friend of Walter. The professor finds Walter the Limmeridge job, introducing him to Laura and Marian, and proves to be Fosco's unexpected nemesis.

== Themes and influences ==
A theme of the story is the unequal position of married women in law at the time. Laura Glyde's interests have been neglected by her uncle, and her fortune of £20,000 (then an enormous sum of money) by default falls to her husband on her death. Collins dedicated this novel to Bryan Procter, poet and Commissioner for Lunacy, and was inspired by the case of Louisa Nottidge, who was abducted and imprisoned for the monetary convenience of her family. Women could be imprisoned in "lunatic asylums" if they became embarrassing or inconvenient to their husbands or fathers. In addition, before the passage of the Married Women's Property Act 1882, all of a wife's assets passed automatically to her husband.

== Publication ==
The novel was first published in serial form in 1859—60, appearing in Charles Dickens' magazine All the Year Round (UK) and Harper's Weekly (US). It was published in book form on 15 August 1860.

== Critical reception ==
The novel was extremely successful commercially, but contemporary critics were generally hostile. Modern critics regard it as Collins's best novel, a view with which Collins concurred, as it is the only novel named in his chosen epitaph: "Author of The Woman in White and other works of fiction".

The novel’s continuing influence in the 21st century led to the publication of a 12-novel series by American author Brenda Clough, following up on the plot, with Marian Halcombe as protagonist.

== Adaptations ==
=== Theatre ===
- 1860 Surrey Theatre stage melodrama The Woman in White
- 1871 Wilkie Collins stage melodrama The Woman in White
- 1975 Tim Kelly stage melodrama Egad, the Woman in White
- 1988 Melissa Murray stage play The Woman in White
- 2004 Andrew Lloyd Webber stage musical The Woman in White
- 2005 Constance Cox stage play The Woman in White

=== Film and television ===
- two 1912 American silent films
  - The Woman in White
- two 1917 American silent films
  - The Woman in White with Florence La Badie
  - Tangled Lives
- 1921 Austrian silent film The Woman in White
- 1929 British silent film adapted by Robert Cullen starring Haddon Mason as Walter Hartright and Louise Prussing as Marian Halcombe
  - The Woman in White
- The 1940 film Crimes at the Dark House (1940) directed by George King is loosely based on The Woman in White with Tod Slaughter playing the part of the false Sir Percival Glyde and Hay Petrie as Count Fosco renamed "Dr. Isidore Fosco".
- 1948 Hollywood film adapted by Stephen Morehouse Avery starring Gig Young as Walter Hartright, Alexis Smith as Marian Halcombe, Eleanor Parker as Laura Fairlie/Anne Catherick and Sydney Greenstreet as Count Fosco.
- 1964 Indian Hindi film Woh Kaun Thi?
- 1966 BBC serial in six parts starring Alethea Charlton as Marian Halcombe, Jennifer Hilary as Laura Fairlie and Nicholas Pennell as Walter Hartright. All six episodes are believed to be lost.
- 1969 PTV Drama Safaid Saya starring Badar Munir
- 1971 German TV miniseries The Woman in White, adapted by Herbert Asmodi, directed by Wilhelm Semmelroth, starring Christoph Bantzer as Walter Hartright, Heidelinde Weis as Laura Fairlie/Anne Catherick and Eric Pohlmann as Count Fosco.
- 1980 RAI Television (Italian National Public Broadcasting Company), Four episodes. Directed by Mario Morini; Screenplay by Idalberto Fei and Giovannella Gaipa, starring Anna Maria Gherardi (Marian Halcombe), Micaela Esdra (Laura Glyde, née Fairlie), Paolo Bonacelli (Percival Glyde), Lino Troisi (Count Fosco)
- 1982 BBC mini-series adapted by Ray Jenkins starring Daniel Gerroll as Walter Hartright and Diana Quick as Marian Halcombe
- 1982 Soviet film under the Russian title Zhenshchina v belom, directed by Vadim Derbenyov and starring Aleksandr Abdulov as Walter Hartright and Lithuanian actress Gražina Baikštytė as both Laura Fairlie and Anne Catherick
- 1997 BBC TV series adapted by David Pirie starring Andrew Lincoln as Walter Hartright and Tara Fitzgerald as Marian Halcombe; also broadcast on PBS television in 1998
- 2018 BBC TV series was adapted by Fiona Seres. This series stars Ben Hardy as Walter Hartright and Jessie Buckley as Marian Halcombe. It aired in the UK in spring of 2018 in five episodes.
- 2026 Russian mini television series adapted by Stanislav Nazirov. It aired in Russia in May 2026 in eight episodes.

=== Radio ===
- A 12-part adaptation by Howard Agg, broadcast on BBC Radio 4 October–December 1969, with Peter Baldwin as Walter Hartright, Margaret Wolfit as Marian Halcombe, Patricia Gallimore as Laura Fairlie, Denys Hawthorne as Sir Percival Glyde and Francis de Wolff as Count Fosco.
- A four-part adaptation by Martyn Wade, broadcast on BBC Radio 4's Classic Serial November–December 2001, with Toby Stephens as Walter Hartright, Juliet Aubrey as Marian Halcombe, Emily Bruni as Laura Fairlie, Jeremy Clyde as Sir Percival Glyde and Philip Voss as Count Fosco.

=== Literature ===
- Douglas Preston and Lincoln Child published the novel Brimstone (2004), featuring a modern re-imagining of the villain Count Fosco.
- James Wilson, The Dark Clue (2001): a "sequel" to The Woman in White
- Sarah Waters, Fingersmith (2002) is a reimagining of The Woman in White

=== Computer games ===
- Victorian Mysteries: Woman in White (2010) created by FreezeTag Games
