= Lady Audley's Secret =

1862 sensation novel by Mary Elizabeth Braddon

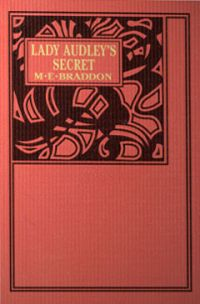
- Cover of Lady Audley's Secret
- Author: Mary Elizabeth Braddon
- Language: English
- Genre: Sensation novel
- Published: 1 October 1862
- Publisher: William Tinsley
- Publication place: United Kingdom
- Media type: Print (hardcover)
- Pages: 3 vols., 355
- ISBN: 978-0-19-953724-2
- Preceded by: The Black Band
- Followed by: John Marchmont's Legacy

Lady Audley's Secret is a sensation novel by Mary Elizabeth Braddon published on 1 October 1862. It was Braddon's most successful and well-known novel. Critic John Sutherland (1989) described the work as "the most sensationally successful of all the sensation novels". The plot centres on "accidental bigamy" which was in literary fashion in the early 1860s. The plot was summarised by literary critic Elaine Showalter (1982): "Braddon's bigamous heroine deserts her child, pushes husband number one down a well, thinks about poisoning husband number two and sets fire to a hotel in which her other male acquaintances are residing". Elements of the novel mirror themes of the real-life Constance Kent case of June 1860 which gripped the nation for years. Braddon's second 'bigamy' novel, Aurora Floyd, appeared in 1863. Braddon set the story in Ingatestone Hall, Essex, inspired by a visit there. There have been three silent film adaptations, one UK television version in 2000, and three minor stage adaptations.

== History ==
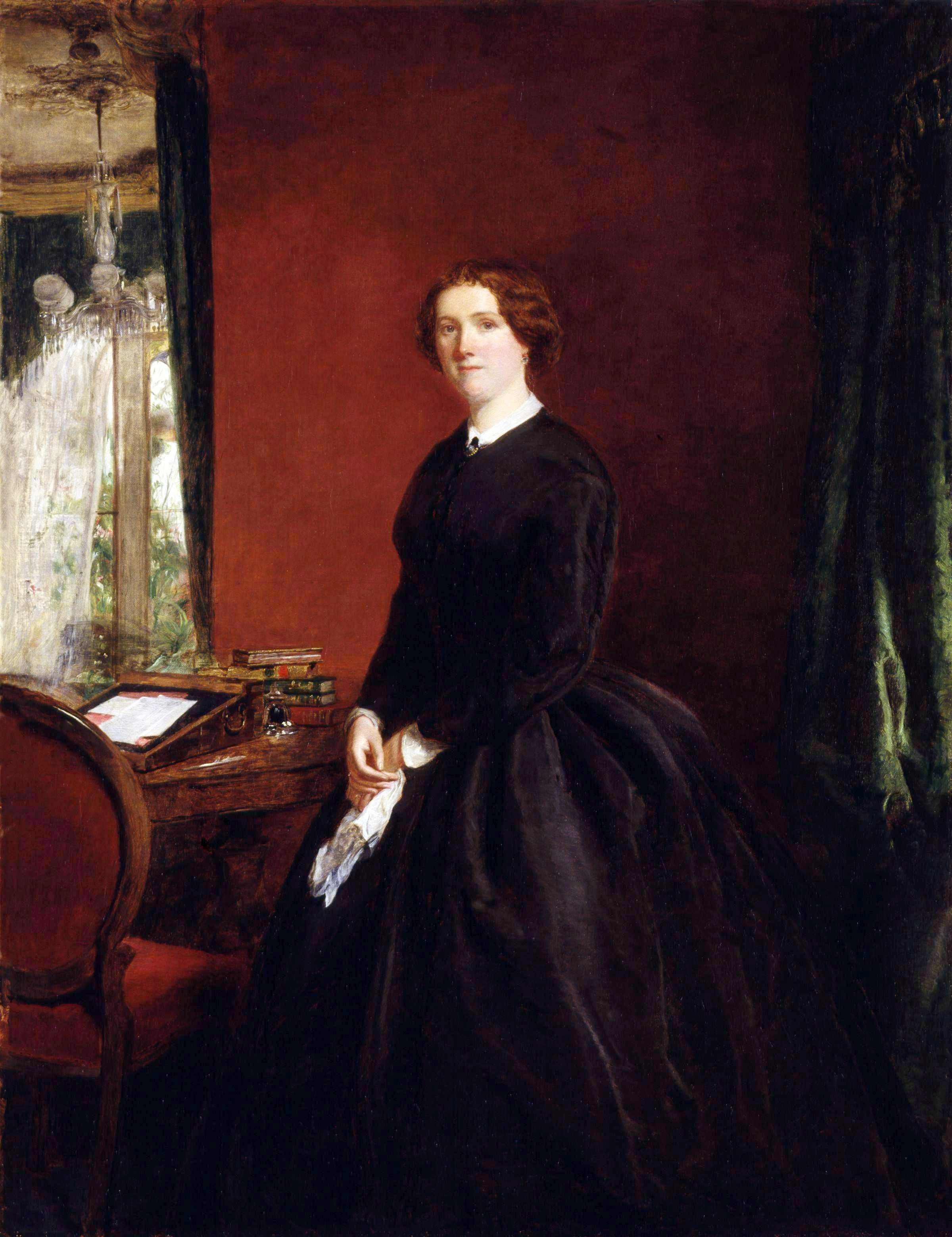
Portrait of Mary Elizabeth Braddon by William Powell Frith, 1865

Lady Audley's Secret was partly serialised in Robin Goodfellow magazine in July–September 1861, then entirely serialised in Sixpenny Magazine in January–December 1862 and once again serialised in The London Journal March–August 1863. It was published in 1862 in three volumes by William Tinsley.

The novel being published during the serialized fiction trend demonstrates how the Victorian periodical boom redefined reading culture in the 19th century. Publication as a periodical allowed Braddon to build anticipation week by week as she released each consecutive installment, which is the strategy that skyrocketed Lady Audley’s Secret’s popularity among the middle and working classes, since serialization was a cheaper alternative than releasing full works.

Ironically, the novel was published during extreme Victorian era gender role debates, when society struggled to define the characteristics of a respectable woman. Desirable qualities included submissiveness, kindness, innocence, and motherhood. Many of these Victorian gender ideals were challenged through the characters in the novel, namely through Lady Audley, who wreaked havoc and sought control of her own life, beauty, and wealth rather than stability through a husband.

Braddon initially sold the rights to the Irish publisher John Maxwell, with whom Braddon also lived and had children. Maxwell published it in his magazine Robin Goodfellow. Braddon wrote the final third in less than two weeks. It was published as a three-volume novel, and it became a success, allowing Braddon to be financially independent for the rest of her life. It was also a financial success for Tinsley, who went on to build a villa in Barnes, "Audley Lodge", with the profits.

Notably – given the theme of bigamy in the novel's plot – Maxwell himself was married to another woman, and so Braddon was unable to marry him until his wife died in 1874. When it became public that Maxwell and Braddon had been living in an "irregular" arrangement all those years, it caused a minor scandal during which all their servants gave notice.

In 1997 a Wordsworth Limited edition was released with an Introduction by Keith Carabine from the University of Kent in which he states, "In the latter half of the nineteenth century, everyone knew Lady Audley's Secret."

In 1891, a parody of and sequel to the original novel written by William Edward Clery, titled A New Lady Audley, was published under the pseudonym of "Austin Fryers".

== Plot ==
The novel opens in June 1857 with the marriage of Lucy Graham and Sir Michael Audley. Lucy is a young, beautiful woman who enchants almost all who meet her. Sir Michael is a kindly, wealthy middle-aged widower. Lucy's past is unclear. Prior to marrying Sir Michael she had served as governess for the children of the local doctor, Mr. Dawson, and before that she was in service with Mrs. Vincent. Very little is known about her prior to that. Shortly after the marriage Sir Michael's nephew, the barrister Robert Audley, welcomes his old friend George Talboys back to England.

Three years before, though happily married, George's financial situation had been desperate. He left for Australia to seek a fortune in gold prospecting. Behind him in England he had left his young wife Helen, whom he is now anxious to get news of. He reads in the newspaper that she has died, and, after visiting her home to confirm this, he becomes despondent. Robert Audley cares for his friend, and, hoping to distract him, offers to take him to his wealthy uncle's country manor. George had a child, Georgey, who was left under the care of Captain Maldon, George's father-in-law. Robert and George set off to visit Georgey, and George decides to make Robert little Georgey's guardian and trustee of £20,000 put into the boy's name. After settling the matter of the boy's guardianship, the two set off to visit Sir Michael.

While at the country manor Audley Court, Lady Audley avoids meeting George. When the two seek an audience with the new Lady Audley, she makes many excuses and avoids their visits. During her absence a thunder storm confines George and Robert to the interior of Audley Court, and the two are shown a portrait of Lady Audley. Looking back toward his friend, Robert notes that George seems disturbed, and attributes his disturbed mood to the storm. Shortly thereafter George disappears. Robert is perplexed. Unwilling to believe George simply left with no notice, Robert begins to look into the circumstances of his disappearance.

While searching for his friend, Robert takes note of the events surrounding George's disappearance. The name of Lady Audley repeatedly appears in these notes, and much to his distress, the evidence begins to collect against her. One night, he reveals his notes to Lady Audley, including that George was in possession of many letters of his former wife. Lady Audley sets off to London, where the letters were kept. Robert follows after her. However, by the time he arrives, he discovers that George's possessions have been broken into and the letters are missing. One possession, however, remains – a book with a note written by George's wife that matches Lady Audley's handwriting. This confirms Robert's suspicion that Lady Audley is implicated in George's disappearance; it also leads Robert to conclude that Lady Audley is actually George's supposedly dead wife.

Suspecting the worst of Lady Audley and being afraid for little Georgey's life, Robert travels to Captain Maldon's house and demands possession of the boy. Once Robert has Georgey under his control, he places the boy in a school run by Mr. Marchmont. Afterwards, Robert visits George's father, Mr. Harcourt Talboys, and confronts the Squire with his son's death. Harcourt listens dispassionately to the story. In the course of his visit to the Talboys' manor, Robert is entranced by George's sister Clara, who looks startlingly like George. Clara's passion for finding her brother spurs Robert on.

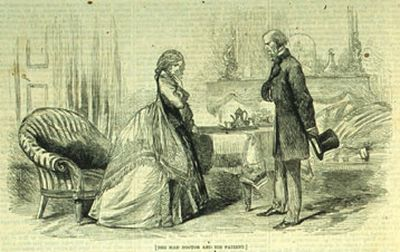
Confession scene from a serialised magazine version

In February 1859, Robert continues searching for evidence. He receives a notice that his uncle is ill, and he quickly returns to Audley Court. While there, Robert speaks with Mr. Dawson and receives a brief description of all that is known about Lucy's background. He hears that Lucy was employed by Mrs. Vincent at her school since 1852. To verify this claim, Robert tracks down Mrs. Vincent, who is in hiding because of debts. According to Miss Tonks, a teacher at Mrs. Vincent's school, Lucy actually arrived at the school in August 1854 and was secretive about her past. Miss Tonks gives Robert a travel box that used to belong to Lucy. Upon examining stickers on the box, Robert discovers both the name Lucy Graham and the name Helen Talboys.

Robert realizes that Helen Talboys faked her death before creating her new identity. When Robert confronts Lucy, she tells him that he has no proof. He leaves to find more evidence, heading to Castle Inn, which is run by Luke Marks. During the night, Lucy forces Luke's wife, Phoebe, to let her into the inn, then Lucy sets the place afire to kill Robert. However, Robert survives and returns to Audley Court and again confronts Lucy. This time, she says she is insane and confesses her life's story to Robert and Sir Michael, claiming that George abandoned her originally and she had no choice but to abandon her old life and child to find another, wealthier husband.

Sir Michael is unhappy and leaves with Alicia to travel through Europe. Robert invites a Dr. Mosgrave to make a more astute judgment regarding Lucy's sanity, and he proclaims that Lucy has latent insanity, but her cunning and ambition make her dangerous. Robert Audley transports Lucy, under the name of Madame Taylor, to a mental institution located somewhere in Belgium along the route between Brussels and Paris. While being committed, Lucy confesses to Robert that she killed George by pushing him down a deserted well in the garden of Audley Court.

Robert grieves for his friend George until a dying Luke Marks contacts him. Before succumbing to injuries he suffered in the fire, Luke tells Robert that George survived Lady Audley's attempted murder. Luke then helped George escape, with George intending to return to Australia. Robert is overjoyed, and he asks Clara to marry him and go with him to Australia to find George. Clara accepts, but before they set out, George returns and reveals that he actually visited New York instead. The narrative ends with the death of Lucy abroad, and Clara and Robert happily married and living in a country cottage with George and his son. Robert's formerly infatuated cousin Alicia marries her once-spurned suitor, Sir Harry Towers, and Audley Court is left abandoned along with all of its unhappy memories.

== Characters ==
- Robert Audley – The best friend of George Talboys and Michael Audley's nephew. An unemployed barrister, he uses his knowledge of the law to investigate the disappearance of his friend, fulfilling a pseudo-detective role.
- Lucy, Lady Audley (also known as Helen Talboys; called Lucy Graham before marriage) – A young woman born into poverty. After her first husband disappears, she fakes her death and remarries. Her astounding physical beauty and grace provides a stark contrast to her criminal personality.
- George Talboys – Lucy's first husband and George's father. He spent three years in Australia prior to the start of the story.
- Sir Michael Audley – A baronet and Lucy's second husband.
- Alicia Audley – Michael's daughter from his previous marriage. She is one of the sole characters who does not like Lucy at the start.
- Phoebe Marks – Lucy's maid who used to work as a governess alongside the former.
- Luke Marks – Phoebe's cousin and husband.
- Harcourt Talboys – George's aristocratic father who disowned him after he married a poor woman.
- Clara Talboys – George's sister.
- Captain Maldon – Retired naval officer, Helen's father, and former guardian of her son, Georgey.
- George Talboys Jr. (Georgey) – George's son with Helen.

== Analysis and themes ==
Lady Audley's Secret plays on Victorian anxieties about the domestic sphere. The home was supposed to be a refuge from the dangers of the outside world, but in the novel, the seemingly perfect domestic lady turns out to be a violent criminal who has not only tried to commit murder but who has also committed bigamy and abandoned her child. This unsettled Victorian readers because it indicated that the concepts of "the perfect lady/mother" and "domestic bliss" were more idealistic than realistic. In addition, anxieties about the increasing urbanization of Britain abound; the city gives Lady Audley the power to change her identity because it renders its citizens effectively anonymous. The small town of Audley is no longer a refuge where everyone knows the life story of every neighbor; the residents of Audley must accept Lucy Graham's account of herself since they have no other information about her past.

Other anxieties about unstable identity appear throughout the novel: Lady Audley's maid, Phoebe, resembles Lady Audley, thus banishing the idea of physical distinction between the upper and lower classes and therefore of any inherent superiority of the former. Lady Audley's Secret is, furthermore, a story about gender and class, and Lady Audley's objectionable upward mobility suggests a threat to the paradigm of social class. Women in the Victorian era were expected to be the managers of the home and the caretaker of the children. That was about the extent of their purpose in the eyes of the world at that point, so Lady Audley having power and wealth was out of the norm, and most likely shocked readers at the time.

Madness is also a key issue. Lady Audley and others often converse about the meaning of this word, but many readers believe that Lady Audley is not mad. In fact, many critics view Lady Audley's deception as a feminist act in which a woman takes control of the direction of her own life. Women in the Victorian era were often diagnosed as “mad” when they did not adhere to the social constructs of the time, which caused many women to be sent to institutions when they were not actually insane. During this period, mental institutions were on the rise, and the conditions were harsh. Overcrowding and lack of professionals caused the patients to not get the help they truly needed.

The novel mirrors many of the same themes from the real-life Constance Kent case of June 1860. The first instalment of Lady Audley's Secret came out almost exactly one year after the Kent murder. The novel, like the real-life case, featured a stepmother and former governess, a mysterious and brutal murder in a country manor house, a body thrown down a well, and characters fascinated by madness. Constance Kent can be seen in many of the female characters in the novel: the murderess Lady Audley, the tomboyish Alicia Audley, the restrained Phoebe Marks and the lonely Clara Talboys. Jack Whicher, the detective and case investigator, can be seen in the character of Robert Audley.

== Adaptations ==
Films

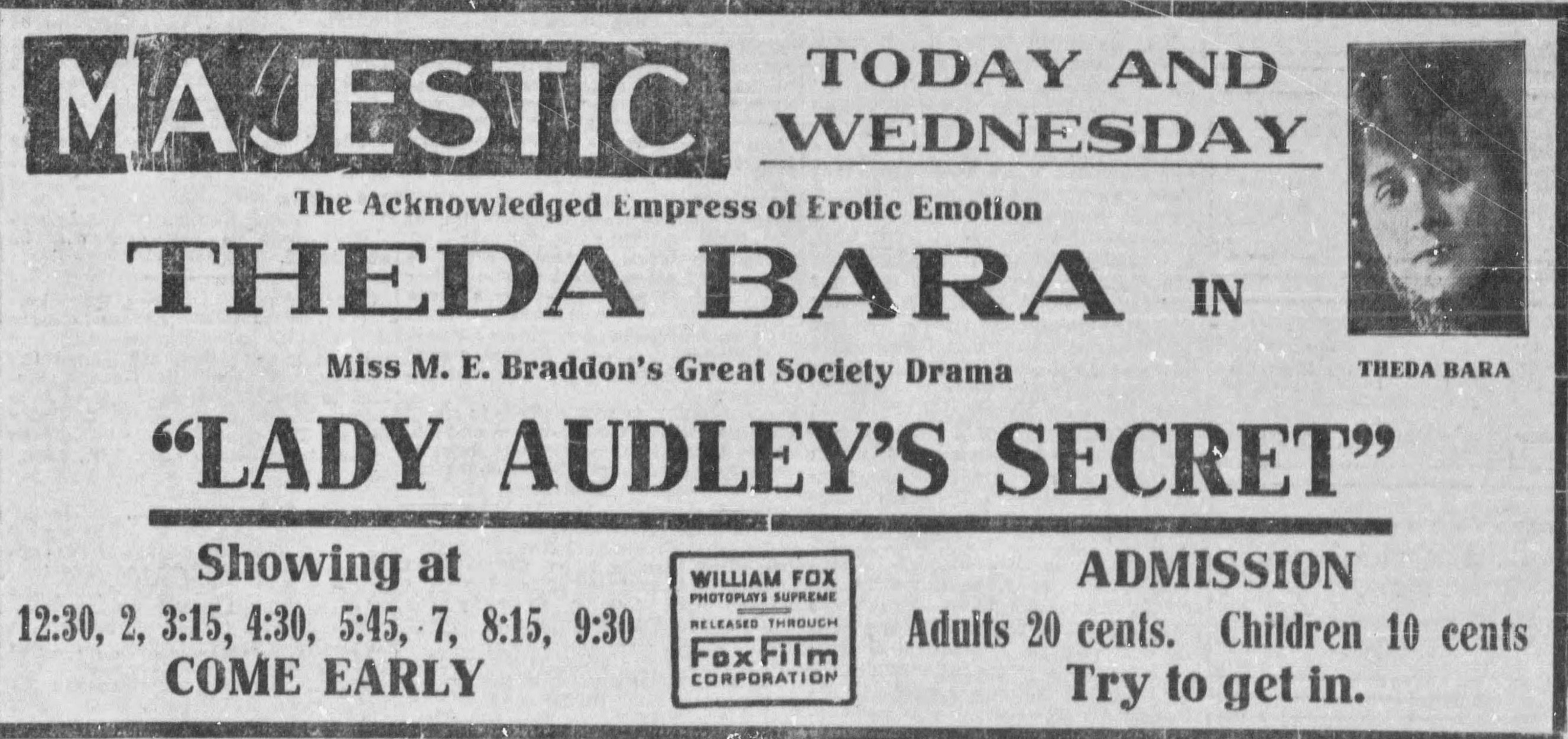
Advertisement for 1915 adaptation

- Lady Audley's Secret, 1912 (USA, black and white, silent)
- Lady Audley's Secret (aka Secrets of Society), 1915 (USA, black and white, silent, directed by Marshall Farnum)
- Lady Audley's Secret, 1920 (UK, black and white, silent, directed by Jack Denton)
- Lady Audley's Secret, 1949 (UK, TV, black and white)
- Lady Audleys Geheimnis, 1978 (West Germany, TV, directed by Wilhelm Semmelroth)
- Lady Audley's Secret, 2000 (UK, TV, directed by Betsan Morris Evans) – (In the USA part of the Mystery! series.)

Radio

- Lady Audley's Secret, 2009 (UK, BBC Radio 4)

Stage

- 1863 – adapted by Colin Henry Hazlewood, first performed at the Victoria Theatre, London, 1863. Hazlewood also dramatised Braddon's Aurora Floyd the same year.
- 1930 – Cambridge Festival Theatre: a "melodramatized version" of the novel including a "birthday fete" and Rustic Ballet. The part of Lady Audley was played by (Dame) Flora Robson and the performance was produced by Tyrone Guthrie. It was preceded by a performance of Morton's Cox and Box.
- 1971 – Chicago, Goodman Theatre, adaptation by Douglas Seale, music by George Goehring, and lyrics by John B. Kuntz.
- 1972 – Off-Broadway, Seale adaptation, music by George Goehring, and lyrics by John B. Kuntz.

== In popular culture ==
Lady Audley's Secret is involved in a subplot of Betsy and Tacy Go Downtown, the fourth book in the Betsy-Tacy series by Maud Hart Lovelace. Betsy has read it and other books in the same genre, and aspires to write similar works.

In the Agatha Christie short story "Greenshaw's Folly", Miss Greenshaw hides her will in a copy of Lady Audley's Secret, remarking it was a "best-seller in its day".
