= Reginald Maxwell (civil servant) =

British administrator and civil servant

Sir Reginald Maitland Maxwell, GCIE KCSI (24 August 1882 – 29 July 1967) was a British administrator in India. A member of the Indian Civil Service, he spent much of his career in the Bombay Presidency, before moving into the service of the Government of India. He was Home Member of the Governor-General's Executive Council from 1938 to 1944.

== Life and career ==
Reginald Maxwell was the son of John Maxwell, of Richmond, head of a London publishing firm. His grandfather, also John Maxwell, was also a publisher, while the novelist W. B. Maxwell was an uncle. On his mother's side, his grandparents were the long-time proprietors of the Theatre Royal, Edinburgh.

Maxwell was educated at Marlborough College and Corpus Christi College, Oxford. He passed into the Indian Civil Service by examination in 1905, arrived in India in November 1906, and spent the next 30 years in the Bombay Presidency. He was private secretary to the Governor of Bombay, Sir George Lloyd, from 1920 to 1921. He also served as private secretary to Sir Frederick Sykes from 1929 to 1931.

He retired from the ICS in 1944 and returned to the United Kingdom, where he was appointed Adviser to the Secretary of State for India, which he held until Indian independence in 1947.

Maxwell was also a noted collector of butterflies, giving 6,000 specimens to the Natural History Museum in London between 1950 and 1967.

== Honours ==
Maxwell was appointed CIE in 1923, CSI in 1933, knighted KCSI in 1939, and GCIE in 1944.
