= Cometh Up as a Flower =

1867 novel by Rhoda Broughton

Cometh Up as a Flower is the second novel by popular Victorian novelist and short story writer Rhoda Broughton. First published in 1867, the novel is often grouped with the sensation novels of the 1860s and 1870s, though Pamela K. Gilbert notes that "her novels were not characterized by the kind of dark secrets and heavily plotted crime stories that were common in the writing of more typical sensation authors such as Wilkie Collins or Mary Elizabeth Braddon".

Cometh Up as a Flower had been published in serial form prior to its publication in a single volume, and was considered somewhat "less racy" by publishers than her previous novel.
