= Portrait of Mary Elizabeth Braddon =

Painting by William Powell Frith

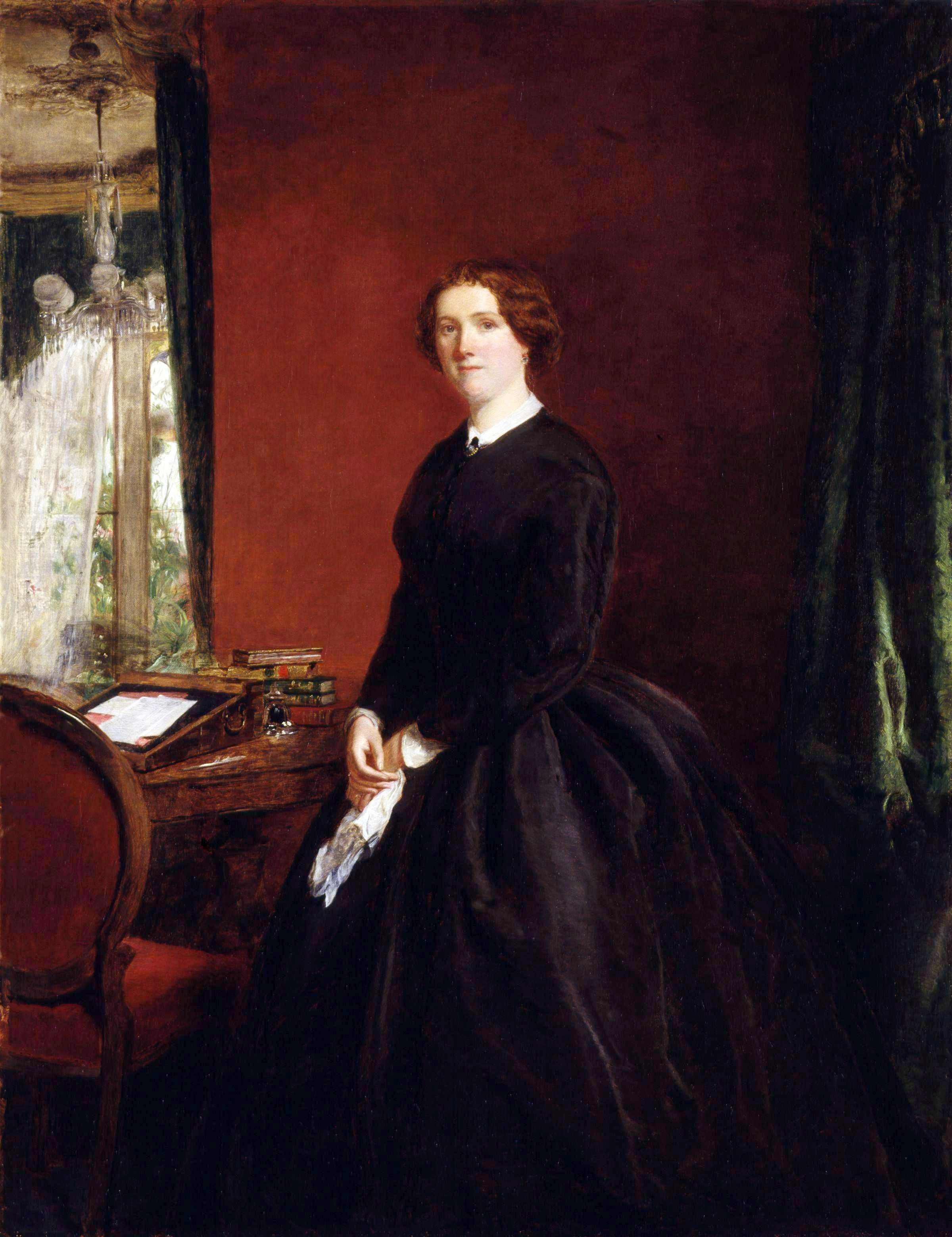
- Artist: William Powell Frith
- Year: 1865
- Type: Oil on canvas, portrait painting
- Dimensions: 91.4 cm × 71.8 cm (36.0 in × 28.3 in)
- Location: National Portrait Gallery; London

Portrait of Mary Elizabeth Braddon is an 1865 portrait painting by the British artist William Powell Frith. It depicts the author Mary Elizabeth Braddon.

Braddon had gained fame through her 1862 sensation novel Lady Audley's Secret. Frith was best known for his panoramic scenes of Victorian life such as The Derby Day. He was a close associate of Charles Dickens and was on friendly terms with Braddon as well. He also featured her in his later group painting A Private View at the Royal Academy, 1881.

The painting was displayed at the Royal Academy Exhibition of 1865 held at the National Gallery in London. It was later acquired by the neighbouring National Portrait Gallery in 1966.

== Bibliography ==
- Green, Richard & Sellars, Jane. William Powell Frith: The People's Painter. Bloomsbury, 2019.
- Ormond, Richard. Early Victorian Portraits, National Portrait Gallery, 1974.
- Saywell, David & Simon, Jacob. National Portrait Gallery: Complete Illustrated Catalogue. National Portrait Gallery, 2004.
