= John Maxwell (publisher) =

Irish businessman (1824–1895)

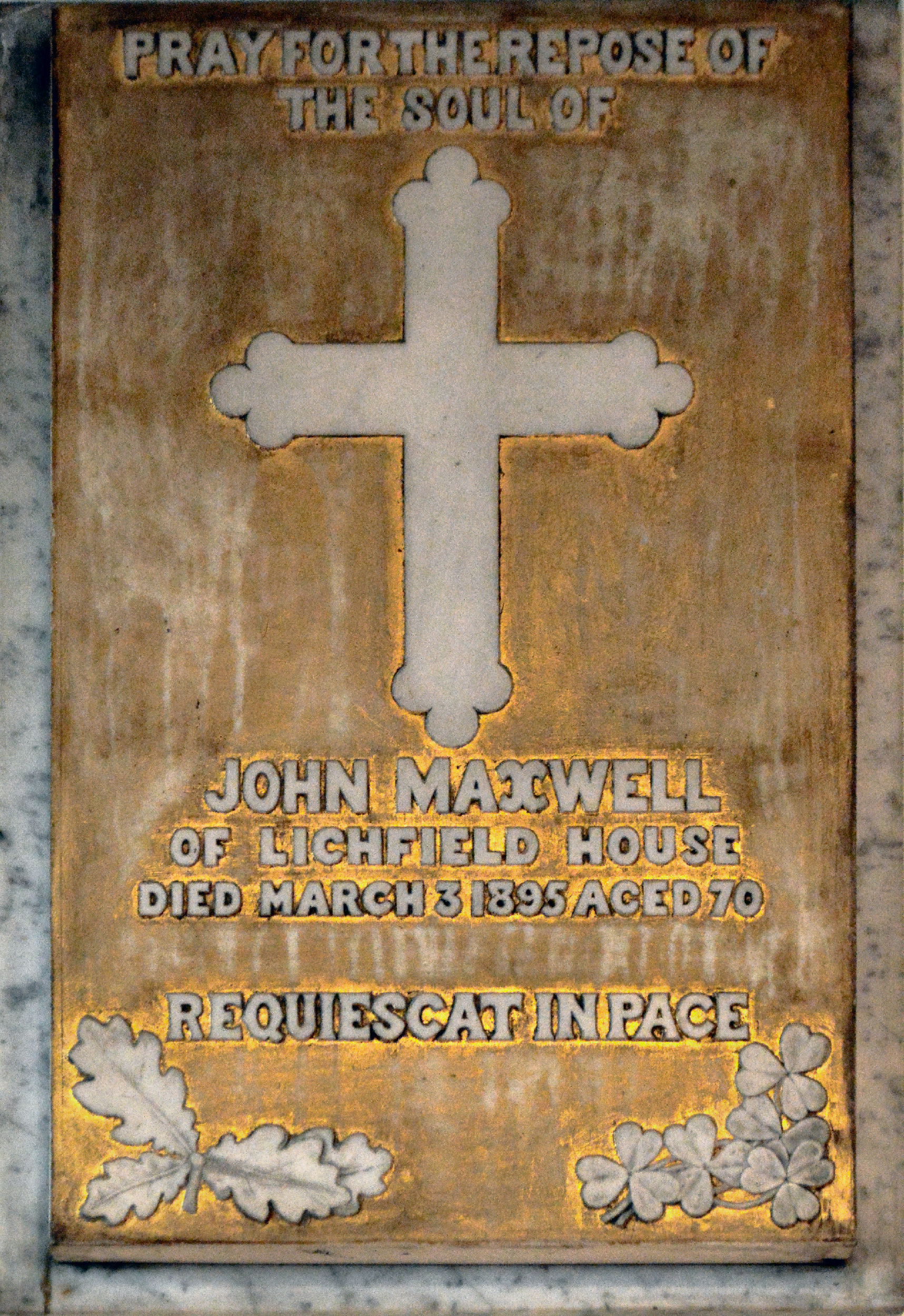
- Memorial to Maxwell in St Elizabeth of Portugal Church, Richmond, London
- Born: 1824; Ulster, Ireland
- Died: 1895 (aged 70–71)
- Occupations: Businessman, publisher and property developer
- Years active: 1850s–1895
- Spouses: Mary Anne Crowley (m. 1848; died 1874) Mary Elizabeth Braddon (m. 1874)
- Children: W. B. Maxwell and others

John Maxwell (1824–1895) was an Irish businessman and publisher. Known for his controversial publishing practices, and his work with Mary Elizabeth Braddon, he also worked as a property developer in London. He is known for his weekly magazines containing fiction and gossip aimed at a working-class audience, which he ran while also cultivating upmarket readers with monthly publications.

== Biography ==
Born in Ulster, Ireland, he was orphaned due to his parents dying at a young age. He came to London in 1842, making him 18 years old when he began his professional career, starting with the publication of Gerald Griffin's poetry.

Maxwell married twice. With his first wife, Mary Anne Crowley, whom he married in 1848, he had at least five surviving children. In a few years, their relationship had already begun to deteriorate, especially due to her mental illness after the birth of her seventh child. In the 1850's, she was later confined to a lunatic asylum, later dying in 1874. While still technically married, he was having an affair with Braddon starting in February 1861 while his wife was still in the asylum. From 1862-1870, Braddon and Maxwell had six children together and had even registered them as a married couple. He had even published about them being married in 1864 before they actually got married in 1874. The law during the time prevented Maxwell from divorcing his first wife, so he had to wait for Crowley's death before marrying Braddon. They first met at the Fleet Street offices of the Welcome Guests in April 1860 and Maxwell hired her. He was impressed with her ability to write for multiple audiences and rebranded her stories for higher class audiences. The couple supported and benefited each other financially. Braddon not only supported Maxwell and his five children, but their own children as well. She also appreciated Maxwell's business-oriented approach and it helped her be motivated and make business decisions. After others found out that they were not yet married and were having an affair, the couple faced public disapproval, with Mary possibly facing greater backlash due to her not having the respectability expected from a woman of this time. The actor Gerald Melbourne Maxwell, author W. B. Maxwell and barrister Edward Henry Harrington Maxwell were her sons.

== Publishing career ==
During the inception of Maxwell's publishing career, he had the goal of publishing the work of Gerald Griffin while simultaneously working as a newsagent. He began to gain traction after selling advertisements for the Illustrated Times, which was owned by Henry Vizetelly. He oversaw several publications that were printed and distributed once a week, also known as "weeklies." His publications included Town Talk (1858), the monthly Sixpenny Magazine (1861-1864), The Halfpenny Journal (1861-1865), and The Welcome Guest (1858-1864), which he purchased from Henry Vizetelly in 1859 for £500.

=== Sixpenny Magazine (1861-1864) ===
Sixpenny Magazine was founded after Maxwell's former Robin Goodfellow Magazine folded. It was a Victorian era illustrated monthly magazine that was published by Ward and Lock from 1861 until 1868 along with Halfpenny Journal, its cheaper weekly counterpart.

Sixpenny Magazine featured serialized novels. John Maxwell republished authors works in Sixpenny Magazine that he paid for contributions, a set rate of money per word or phrase. He often overstepped his payment and republished entire books or installments. Tenured at Illustrated Times, Maxwell likely adopted the lack of formality. (Jokes and news reports were often overlooked in legal action on copyright, but literary works were valued much higher). Following pressed charges at the Court of Chancery was the 1842 Copyright Act which gave authors more copyright protection for longer, and required more formal transference of ownership, posing an even bigger obstacle for Maxwell and Sixpenny's publication.

Lady Audley's Secret by Mary Elizabeth Braddon began serialization in 1861 in Robin Goodfellow and continued in Sixpenny. Braddon was Maxwell's partner and became his wife in 1874. Lady Audley's Secret became a Victorian literary phenomenon, which brought Braddon and Maxwell considerable fame. The success of this novel formed a turning point in Braddon's writing career and solidified her spot as an influential sensational fiction writer, calling more attention to Sixpenny Magazine in the process. Another one of Braddon's works, Captain of the Vulture, was also serialized in Sixpenny.

=== The Welcome Guest (1858-1864) ===
Maxwell hired Mary Elizabeth Braddon as a staff contributor for The Welcome Guest; he saw good fortune in her ability to rapidly write for multiple markets, as he would rebrand her cheap writings for more high-class audiences. During his number of financial struggles, Maxwell would heavily rely on her ability to produce an abundance of writings to survive, Braddon was said to have produced two or more 3-volume novels annually, not including her works for the Sixpenny serial. Overall, Maxwell saw the most success from The Halfpenny Journal. Using his knowledge from his hectic ownership of The Welcome Guest, he strived toward a more appealing magazine to gain traction and keep momentum going with The Halfpenny Journal.

Maxwell continued as a publisher, in particular of reprint fiction.

Maxwell also developed property in Richmond, where he and Braddon lived at Lichfield House. Two nearby streets that he developed are named after characters in Braddon's novels.

== Controversies ==
John Maxwell was a figure of both admiration and criticism, while some people saw him as energetic and determined, others said he was brash, demanding, and ethically questionable. He took works that had originally been published in his magazines and republished them in other formats, like books, without seeking new permission from or paying the authors. Maxwell believed once a writer was paid for the initial publication, the works were his to do whatever he saw fit. However this approach was conflicting with standard legal and ethical norms. At the same time, Maxwell used copyright law to prevent rival publishers from reprinting the same works that appeared in his publications, claiming exclusive rights to them. This financially exploited authors, as the purpose of copyright law is to protect and compensate creators for their original work.

== Financial problems ==
Looking at all of Maxwell's works, it is clear that he dealt with his share of ups and downs. John would lose money on various projects, such as his weekly 'Welcome Guest', which would end up costing about 2,000 pounds over a two year span. This would lead to a lack of financial stability that would cause problems for him and those he worked with. His firm that he shared with Robert Maxwell survived from 1860 to 1887, but along the way needed support. Very early on in 1862, John and Robert lost control of the firm since they could not meet financial obligations, causing him to declare bankruptcy, though they would eventually recover. Eventually, Braddon, his soon to be wife, would be able to support him with her own earnings. They would marry in 1874. He would continue to stay active in his works, and his earnings, along with Braddon's, were enough to provide overall stability.
