= Robin Goodfellow (magazine) =

1861 British literary periodical

Robin Goodfellow was a short-lived literary periodical published in London during 1861. Edited by Charles Mackay, the magazine featured serialized fiction, essays, poetry, and cultural commentary. It reflected the Victorian era's fascination with morality, class, and sensational storytelling. Robin Goodfellow was one of many literary magazines during the height of the Victorian publishing era. Its goal was to provide affordable literature, easily accessible for the majority of people during the time.

== Content and contributors ==
Robin Goodfellow is most notable for publishing early works by two well-known Victorian novelists:

- Lady Audley's Secret by Mary Elizabeth Braddon, serialized in the magazine from July 1861, to September 1861, in weekly installments.
- Which Wins, Love or Money? by Emma Robinson, serialized from July 6, 1861, to September 28, 1861, also on a weekly schedule.

Neither of these novels were completely published by Robin Goodfellow. The publications were halted and Robin Goodfellow entirely went under. The novels both finished their serializations in other periodicals.

== Impact and legacy ==
Robin Goodfellow stopped publication in September 1861, after less than a year in use. Although short-lived, it played a very important role in the early careers of Braddon and Robinson. The magazines brief existence reflects the volatility of the Victorian literary culture, where new publications often struggled to survive because of the intense market competition.
