= The Law and the Lady (novel) =

1875 novel by Wilkie Collins

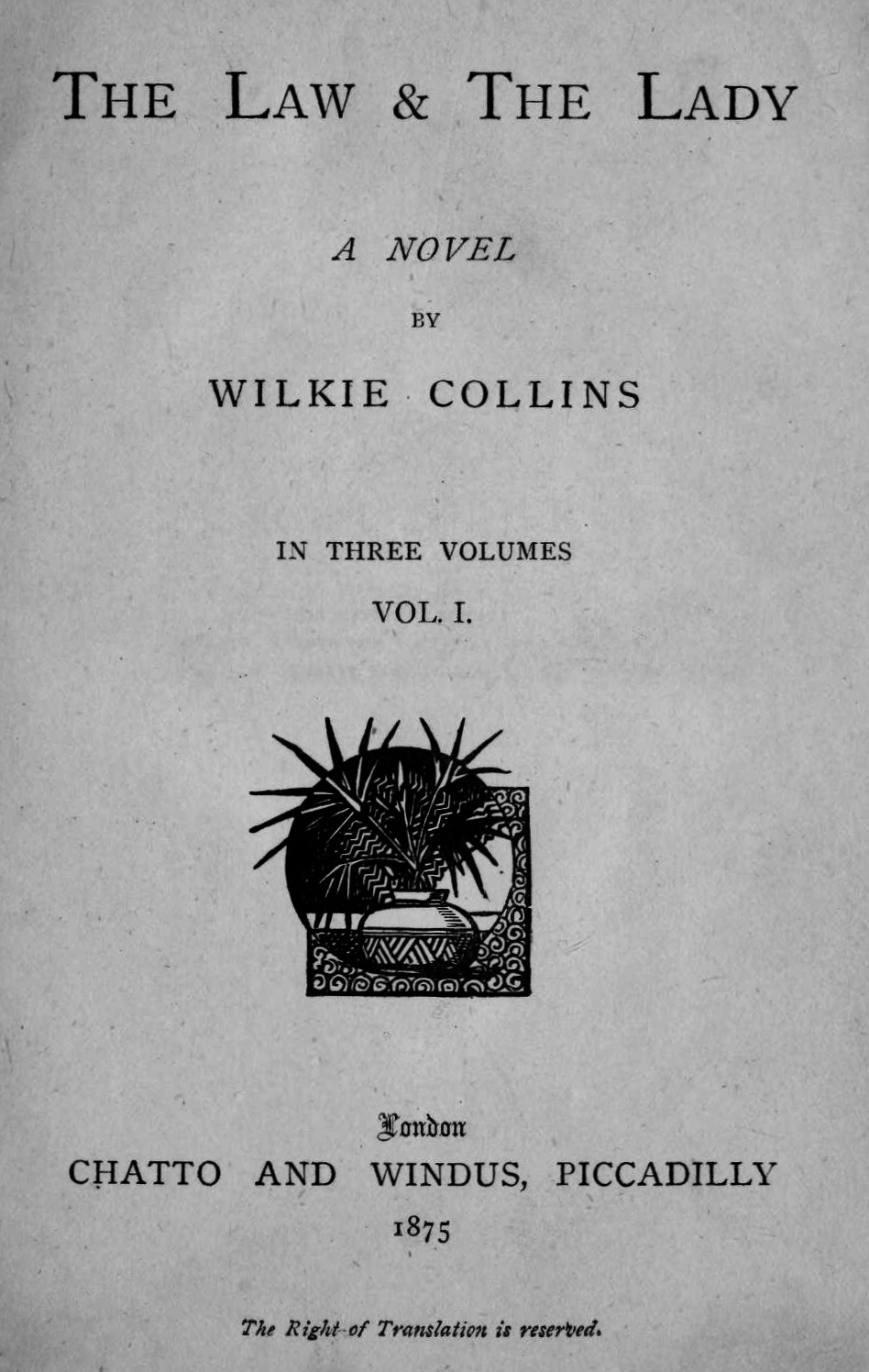
- First edition title page
- Author: Wilkie Collins
- Language: English
- Genre: Mystery, Sensation novel
- Publisher: Chatto & Windus
- Publication date: 1875
- Publication place: United Kingdom
- Media type: Print (Hardback)
- Pages: 3 vol.

The Law and the Lady is a detective story, and sensation novel published in 1875 by Wilkie Collins. It is not quite as sensational in style as The Moonstone and The Woman in White.

== Synopsis ==
Valeria Brinton marries Eustace Woodville despite objections from Woodville's family; this decision worries Valeria's family and friends.

Just a few days after the wedding, various incidents lead Valeria to suspect her husband of hiding a dark secret in his past. She discovers that he has been using a false name, "Woodville", when his true surname is "Macallan". Eustace refuses to discuss it, leading them to curtail their honeymoon and return to London where Valeria learns that he was on trial for his first wife's murder by arsenic. He was tried in a Scottish court and the verdict was 'not proven' rather than 'not guilty'. This implies that, though the jury believe Eustace to be guilty, it did not have enough proof to convict him.

Valeria sets out to save their happiness by proving her husband innocent of the crime. In her quest, she comes across the disabled character Miserrimus Dexter, a fascinating but mentally unstable genius, and Dexter's devoted female cousin, Ariel. Dexter will prove crucial to uncovering the disturbing truth behind the mysterious death.

== Characters ==
- Valeria Brinton. A resilient woman who attempts to prove her husband's innocence after he is accused of poisoning his first wife. She deliberately subverts the typical passivity of the Gothic heroine by acting as a detective. In this, she is a successor to Collins' earlier heroine Marian Halcombe in The Woman in White (1860).
- Eustace Macallan (Woodville). A Scottish individual whose life is destroyed when he is given the 'Scottish verdict' of not proven in his murder trial for his first wife. This causes him to leave his second wife, Valeria Brinton.
- Sara Macallan. Eustace Macallan's first wife who dies from arsenic poisoning.
- Helena Beauly. The cousin of Eustace Macallan with whom he was in love. She serves as a suspect for the murder of Sara Macallan.
- Lady Brydehaven. The aunt of Sara Macallan whose testimony incriminates Eustace Macallan in his murder trial.
- Mr Starkweather. The uncle and guardian of Valeria Brinton, who eventually officiates her marriage.
- Miserrimus Dexter. A disabled genius who was born without legs and lives in a house adorned with skulls. He was a rejected suitor of Sara Macallan, and stayed at her house at the time of her death. He serves as an outlandish portrayal of decadent aestheticism.
- Major Fitz-David. A womaniser who is the friend of Eustace Macallan. He provides Valeria Macallan with documents from her husband's trial.
- Miss Hoighty. A cheerful but untalented girl who is support in her musical career by Major Fitz-David, whom she eventually marries.
- Andrew Kirley. A pharmacist who testifies in Macallan's trial.
- Christina Ormsay. Sara Macallan's nurse who testifies at the trial.

== Themes ==
Wilkie Collins explores themes of disability with the character of Miserrimus Dexter, who is depicted as a handsome and highly intelligent dandy despite the loss of his lower limbs. It is his detective genius that brings the narrative to a conclusion. Despite popular perceptions of the disabled in Victorian society, Collins demonstrates that there are no clear divisions between the disabled and the able-bodied. In his decadence, Dexter also embodies the public views of sensation literature.
