= Lady Audley's Secret (1915 film) =

1915 US silent drama film directed by Marshall Farnum

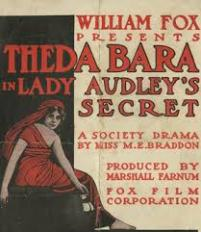
- Directed by: Marshall Farnum
- Written by: Mary Asquith; Mary Elizabeth Braddon (novel)
- Starring: Theda Bara; Riley Hatch; Clifford Bruce
- Cinematography: Norton Davis
- Production company: Fox Film Corporation
- Distributed by: Fox Film Corporation
- Release date: August 4, 1915
- Country: United States
- Language: Silent (English intertitles)

Lady Audley's Secret is a 1915 American silent drama film directed by Marshall Farnum and starring Theda Bara, Riley Hatch and Clifford Bruce. It was an adaptation of the 1862 British novel Lady Audley's Secret by Mary Elizabeth Braddon. It is now considered a lost film. The film was less successful than Bara's other films of the period, because it did not feature her in the wildly popular vamp role she had established.

== Cast ==
- Theda Bara as Helen Talboys
- Riley Hatch as Luke Martin
- Clifford Bruce as George Talboys
- Stephen Grattan as Undetermined Role
- Warner Richmond as Sir Michael Audley

== Bibliography ==
- Goble, Alan. The Complete Index to Literary Sources in Film. Walter de Gruyter, 1999.
- Krefft, Vanda. The Man Who Made the Movies: The Meteoric Rise and Tragic Fall of William Fox. HarperCollins, 2017.
