= The Ragged Messenger =

1917 film

- Directed by: Frank Wilson
- Based on: The Ragged Messenger by W.B. Maxwell
- Release date: 1917
- Country: United Kingdom
- Language: Silent

The Ragged Messenger is a 1917 British drama film directed by Frank Wilson and starring Violet Hopson, Gerald Ames, Basil Gill and George Foley. It was based on the 1904 novel The Ragged Messenger by W.B. Maxwell. A millionaire's mistress marries his nephew, but their relationship only leads to misery and heartbreak for all.

== Cast ==
- Violet Hopson as Mary Ainslee
- Gerald Ames as Walter Bowman
- Basil Gill as Reverend John Morton
- George Foley as Henry Vavasour
- Henry Gilbey
- Ruby Belasco
- John MacAndrews
- Marjorie West
