= The Cloven Foot =

1879 novel by Mary Elizabeth Braddon

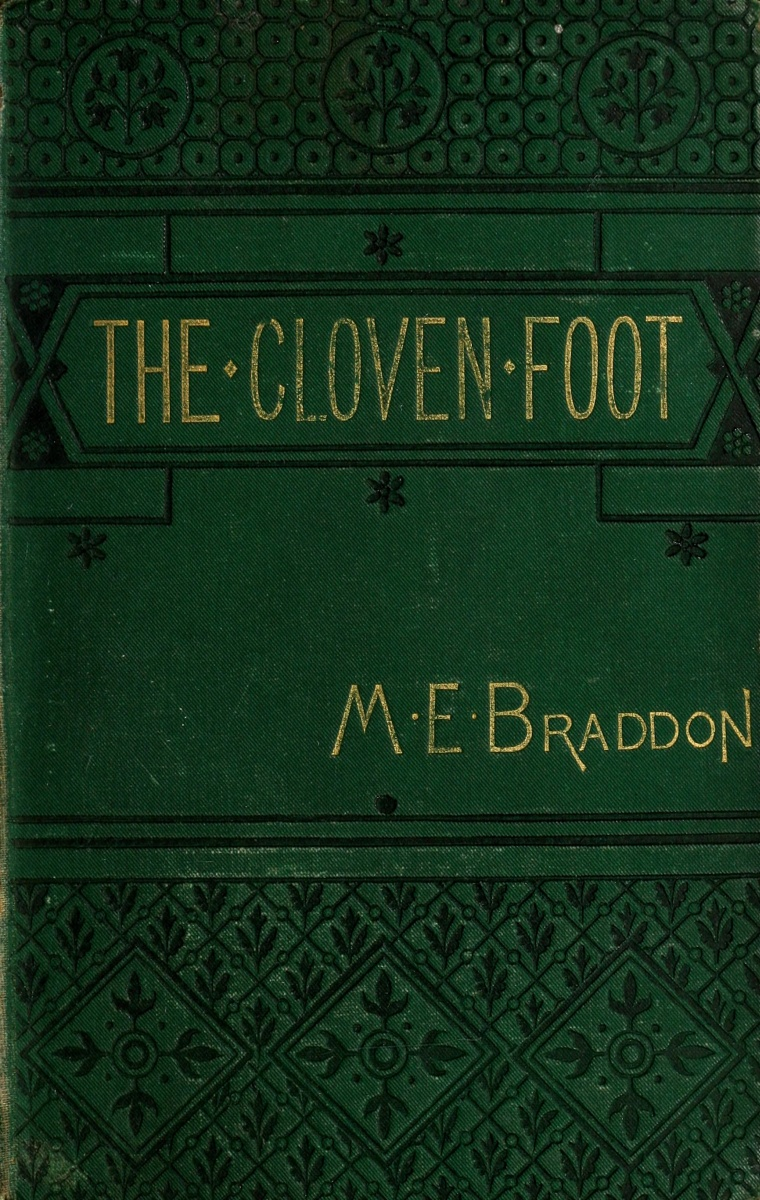
- Cover of the Maxwell edition
- Author: Mary Elizabeth Braddon
- Language: English
- Genre: Sensation novel, detective fiction
- Publisher: John and Robert Maxwell
- Publication date: 1879
- Media type: Print
- Pages: 352 pp (Maxwell edition)

The Cloven Foot is an 1879 novel by Mary Elizabeth Braddon that combines aspects of the sensation novel and detective novel, and may even be considered an early legal thriller.

== Plot summary ==
Jasper Treverton, a wealthy landowner, is dying. He summons his nephew and only living relative, John Treverton, who he has never met, to Hazlehurst Manor, his estate in Devon, where he lives with his adopted daughter, Laura Malcolm, the orphan of his late friend Stephen. After Jasper dies, his will reveals an unusual bequest: he leaves his entire estate to his nephew John, on the condition that John and Laura be married before the end of one calendar year; if this is not fulfilled, the estate will be donated to found a hospital, leaving John with nothing and Laura with a small trust.

John travels back and forth between London and Hazlehurst, wooing Laura (despite alluding repeatedly to a dark and awful past) and eventually marrying her on New Year's Eve, just in time to fulfill the conditions of the will. Despite gaining a vast estate and lovely wife, he is morose, and disappears shortly after the wedding "on business," after secretly creating a legal settlement that grants the entire Hazlehurst estate to Laura.

Meanwhile, in London, the beautiful French dancer La Chicot, recently moved from Paris, has become the latest sensation. She is married to an Englishman named Jack, who is so subordinate to his wife that he takes her name and is known as Jack Chicot. The couple is unhappy; La Chicot drinks too much and flies into rages, while Jack has fallen out of love with his wife and has failed as a painter, making a poor living selling caricatures to comic journals.

Although Jack has fallen out of love with La Chicot, she has gained the attention of two other men: Joseph Lemuel, a millionaire, and George Gerard, a poor but dedicated doctor. Jack disappears on a mysterious errand and puts his wife in the care of Mr. Desrolles, a degraded gentleman lodging upstairs.

In Jack's absence, La Chicot is injured in an accident on stage and nursed back to health by George Gerard; she is also plied with expensive gifts by Mr. Lemuel, who has secretly enrolled Desrolles as an ally in wooing her. After Jack returns, Mr. Lemuel gives La Chicot a necklace of enormous diamonds, which she hides from him, and is known only to Desrolles. Edward Clare, an aspiring poet from Hazlehurst who moved to London to seek his fortune, has a chance encounter with Jack Chicot, who he noticed has an exact likeness with John Treverton.

In the middle of the night, La Chicot is stabbed to death. Jack flees the scene of the crime and goes missing, and the newspapers quickly assume he is the killer. A mysterious man brings some loose diamonds to a merchant, who identifies them as fakes.

John reappears in Hazlehurst and seems strangely relieved. He takes Laura to an isolated village called Camelot to be secretly married a second time. Edward, meanwhile, believes Jack Chicot and John Treverton to be the same person, and therefore suspects John of murdering his wife in order to marry Laura and inherit his uncle's estate. Before he can accuse him publicly, however, John reveals his past to both his wife and the former trustees of the estate.

John now faces arrest for the murder of La Chicot, but also the loss of the estate, because his first marriage to Laura occurred when La Chicot was still alive, and is therefore invalid due to the legal proscription of bigamy. His only hope is to prove that his marriage to La Chicot was itself invalid.

John recalls an episode in Paris when La Chicot reacted strongly to the accidental death of a sailor from her home town, and suspects that she may have been married to him. He travels to France with his lawyer, Mr. Sampson, and finds evidence that La Chicot was indeed married to the sailor, meaning that John's marriage to her was never legal and therefore that the terms of the will were fulfilled.

On their return to England, John is arrested for murder, but is exonerated thanks to the acuity of his lawyer and the testimony of Mrs. Evitt, the landlady of the Chicots and Desrolles, who discovered grey hair in the victim's fist and a bloody gown in Desrolles's closet.

John thus secures his freedom and control of his estate, while Desrolles is tracked down in Paris and killed in a fight with the police.

== Characters ==
- John Treverton, also known as Jack Chicot: a former army officer who lived a bohemian life as an artist in Paris and London before being bequeathed an estate by his uncle Jasper. He is illegitimately married to Zaïre Chicot before her murder. The novel revolves around his dual identity and the difficulties of extricating himself from his old life.
- Laura Malcolm: a beautiful but serious woman adopted by Jasper Treverton as a child after the death of her parents. She marries John despite his mysterious past.
- Celia Clare: Laura's best friend, the vivacious but superficial vicar's daughter.
- Edward Clare: Celia's brother, a lazy, vain failure of a poet who becomes viciously jealous of John.
- Zaïre Chicot, called La Chicot: a dancer, originally from Auray. She marries John/Jack in Paris but their relationship quickly sours.
- Mr. Desrolles, a.k.a. Stephen Malcolm and Colonel Mansfield, real name Captain Desmond: a scoundrel and drunkard who murders La Chicot and blackmails Laura by posing as her deceased father.
- George Gerard: a poor but hardworking surgeon who falls in love with both La Chicot and Celia. He initially suspects John Treverton of being the murderer but eventually helps to exonerate him.
- Thomas Sampson: the Trevertons' lawyer and one of the trustees of the Treverton estate. He accompanies John on his exculpatory mission to France, despite not speaking French.
- Theodore Clare: the vicar of Hazlehurst and the other trustee of the estate. He is Edward and Celia's father.
- Mrs. Evitt: the landlady of the Chicots and Desrolles residence near Leicester Square, London. Her testimony helps prove Desrolles is the murderer.

== Background ==
Braddon began writing The Cloven Foot in April 1878, only two days after finishing her previous novel, Vixen.

== Reception ==
Contemporary reviews were generally positive, noting Braddon's skill in carefully weaving together a complicated plot of double identity and legal minutiae. The Glasgow Herald noted that the character of Edward Clare was sketched with a particular "skill and truthfulness of delineation." A lengthy review in The Observer compares the author to an "accomplished equestrian who not only rides several horses abreast, but as he guides them with one hand, keeps up with the other half-a-dozen glittering balls," but sarcastically notes that in the resolution of one bigamy plot by another, "apparently the only cure for bigamy is a homeopathic one."

== Analysis ==
The Cloven Foot has been identified as part of an 1870s trend in sensational novels towards middle-class criminals and "white-collar" crime such as fraud, in the midst of broadening property rights for married women. In this novel, the protagonist's embroilment in a scheme to fraudulently satisfy the terms of an eccentric will is as significant as the traditional "sensational" themes of bigamy and murder. Although John knowingly intended to commit fraud, he is saved by the legal system, unlike Desrolles, who committed the lower-class crime of murder.

== Adaptations ==
The Cloven Foot was adapted into an 1890 stage play by Frederick Mouillot, which reduces the character of the La Chicot (played by the same actress as Laura Malcolm) to a single act.
