= Aurora Floyd =

1863 novel by Mary Elizabeth Braddon

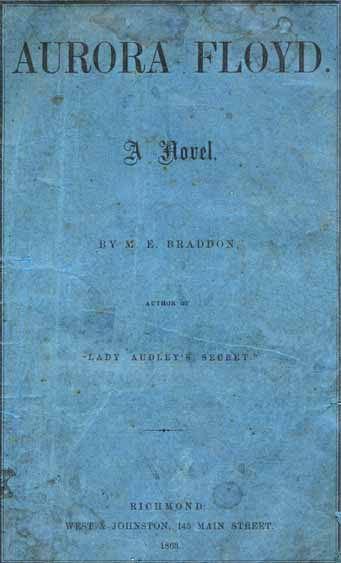
- Cover of an 1863 American edition
- Author: Mary Elizabeth Braddon
- Language: English
- Genre: Sensation novel
- Publisher: Tinsley Brothers
- Publication date: 1 January 1863
- Publication place: London, United Kingdom
- Media type: Print (hardcover)
- Pages: Volume I: 305; volume II: 327; volume III: 319
- OCLC: 35589211

Aurora Floyd is a sensation novel by Mary Elizabeth Braddon published on 1 January 1863. It is thematically similar to her highly popular novel Lady Audley's Secret (1862).

== Synopsis ==
Aurora Floyd is the spoiled but kind-hearted daughter of Archibald Floyd, a wealthy banker, and his wife, an actress who died shortly after Aurora's birth. At 17, she is sent to a Parisian finishing school and returns to her home, Felden Woods in Kent, after 15 months. At her 19th birthday ball, she meets Captain Talbot Bulstrode, a proud Cornish baron's son, and eventually falls in love with him. John Mellish, an old school friend of Talbot, also becomes enamored with Aurora, creating a rivalry between the two men. Talbot proposes, is initially rejected, but after reviving Aurora from a faint, they become engaged. However, Talbot later learns that Aurora ran away from school shortly after arriving and refuses to explain her actions, leading him to end the engagement despite still loving her.

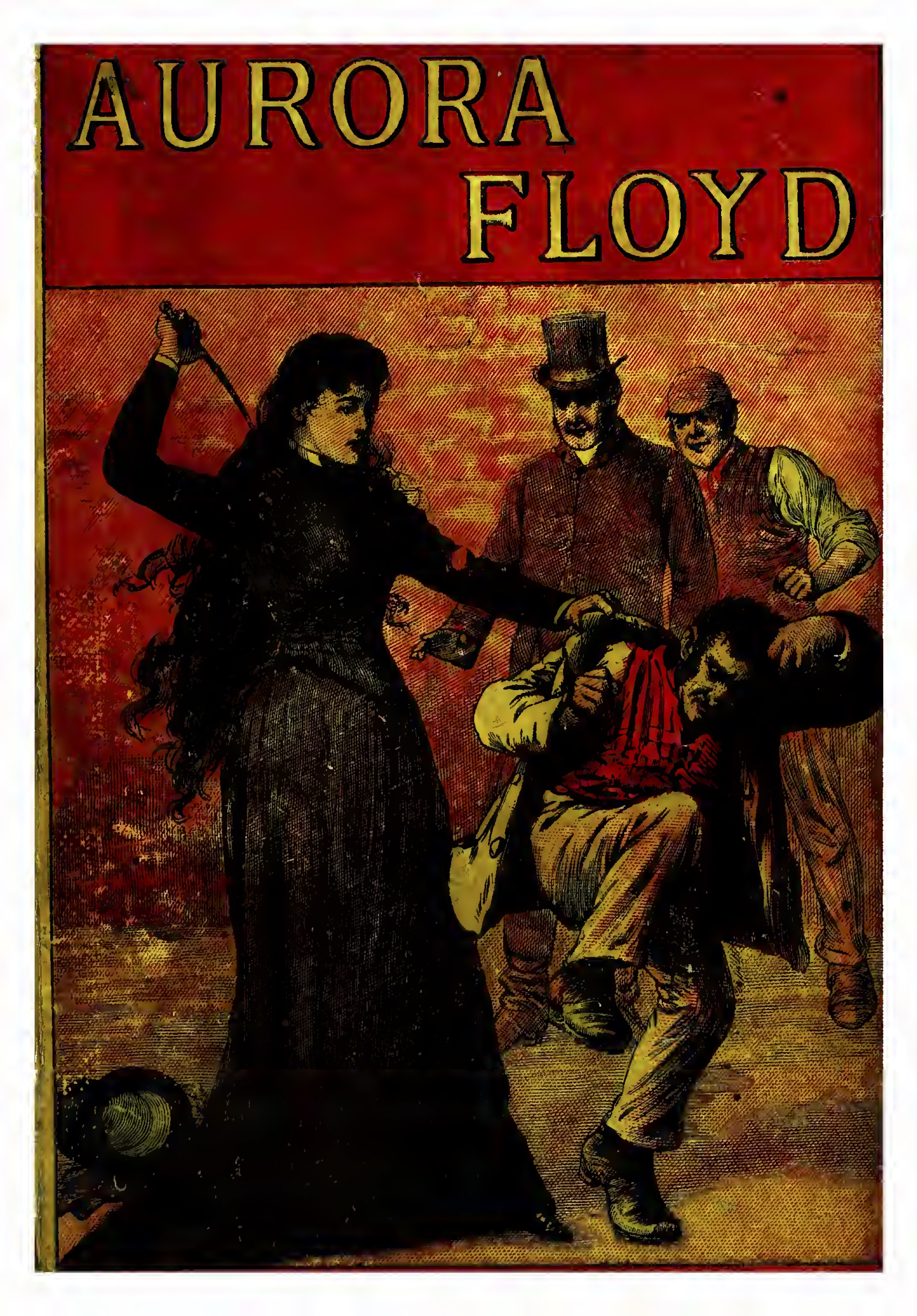
Cover of the 1892 edition. Aurora horsewhips Hargraves for kicking her dog. The scene shocked Victorian readers.

After the end of her engagement, Aurora falls ill for several months. During this time, John Mellish, who has become a favourite of her father, proposes again, and Aurora accepts. They marry and move to Mellish Park. Aurora encounters Stephen Hargraves, a former stable hand with a troubled past, and has him dismissed after he mistreats her dog. Later, James Conyers, a man connected to Aurora's past, arrives at Mellish Park. Conyers is subsequently found dead, revealing that Aurora had previously married him after running away from school, which temporarily renders her marriage to John invalid. Seeking guidance from Talbot Bulstrode, Aurora and John are legally remarried. Rumours of her connection to Conyers spread, causing tension, but the truth about the murder weapon is revealed, and John and Aurora are ultimately reunited.

A Scotland Yard detective, Joseph Grimstone comes to Mellish Park to investigate and finds clues which point to Hargraves as the murderer, but Grimstone is unable to find proof. Out walking one night by the lodge where Conyers was staying, Talbot sees a dim light inside and goes to investigate. He finds Hargraves who has returned to the lodge to retrieve the £2,000 that he took from Conyers after murdering him. After a struggle, Hargraves is subdued and, after confessing his crime, is eventually hanged.

== Characters ==
- Aurora Floyd – black-haired, beautiful daughter of Archibald Floyd and Eliza Floyd (née Prodder)
- Talbot Bulstrode – proud heir to a wealthy Cornish baronetcy and captain of Her Majesty's 11th Hussars; falls in love with Aurora, but rejects her when he learns of the secret stain on her reputation
- John Mellish – owner of Mellish Park in Yorkshire; a big man about 30 years old, but with a childish enthusiasm and innocence; he also falls in love with Aurora
- Archibald Martin Floyd – widowed father of Aurora; a wealthy Kentish banker of Scottish descent and owner of Felden Woods; married at the age of 47
- Lucy Floyd – Aurora's first-cousin-once-removed; eldest daughter of Archibald's nephew Alexander; she is Aurora's closest friend and confidante; angelic and well-educated, but rather simple and meek otherwise; she is secretly in love with Talbot
- Mrs. Alexander Floyd – Lucy's mother; she also acts as a mother-figure to Aurora
- Mrs. Walter Powell – widowed governess/chaperone to Aurora and later her housekeeper after Aurora's marriage; spiteful and envious of Aurora
- James Conyers – very handsome, but lazy, selfish and unscrupulous; he is able to play on his good looks to make people think well of him; lame due to a horse racing accident that nearly killed him; he is hired as the new groom and trainer at the stables of Mellish Park
- Stephen Hargraves – short, fat and ugly; he initially works in the stables at Mellish Park; has a brain injury suffered in a hunting accident years before
- Capt. Samuel Prodder – Aurora's maternal uncle, left England to go sailing when Aurora's mother was still a young girl
- Matthew Harrison – a dog-fancier who attempts to blackmail Aurora with knowledge of her secret
- Joseph Grimstone – a Scotland Yard detective who investigates the murder of James Conyers

== Publication ==
Aurora Floyd was first serialised in London's monthly Temple Bar magazine between January 1862 and January 1863; its success "caused an unprecedented run on the magazine". It was then published in 1863 in three volumes by William Tinsley. This was only a few months after the publication of Mary Elizabeth Braddon's other famous novel, Lady Audley's Secret, which was published in October 1862. The two novels not only helped to establish a literary genre but made Braddon a fortune, with which she purchased a stately home.

When the three volume set was published in 1863, the publishers announced her name for the first time as 'Mary Elizabeth Braddon' rather than the gender-neutral M.E. Braddon. The first single-volume edition of the text appeared at the end of 1863.

One of the inspirations for the eponymous Aurora Floyd was Catherine Walters, also known as "Skittles", an infamous high-class courtesan who made her debut in 1861. She became known for riding along Hyde Park in a pony carriage. Within the novel, Aurora Floyd is frequently described as donning a pork pie hat and having an affection for the stables, both traits which would have brought Catherine Walters to the mind of the Victorian reading public.

== Reception ==
Aurora Floyd is considered one of the pioneers of the sensation novel genre, containing as it does a sense of realism within its domestication of criminality. The rise of this genre concerned many conservative critics, who believed that it might represent the normalisation of vice within the middle classes, and an enthusiasm for the lurid and gruesome within published entertainment.

In an anonymous review published on 9 November 1865 edition of The Nation, Henry James argued that Aurora Floyd represents an improvement not only of Wilkie Collins' mode of the sensation novel, but also serves as a more complex and nuanced tale than Miss Braddon's previous book, Lady Audley's Secret:

Lady Audley was diabolically wicked; Aurora Floyd, her successor, was simply foolish, or indiscreet, or indelicate-- or anything you please to say of a young woman who runs off with a hostler. But as bigamy had been the cause of Lady Audley's crimes, so it is the cause of Aurora's woes.

Leo Tolstoy, who admired Braddon's works, is known to have read Aurora Floyd. According to his sister-in-law, it partly inspired the character Natasha in his War and Peace.

Although eminent Victorian critics derided these sensation novels as ephemeral nonsense, soon to pass into deserved oblivion, Braddon's work, far from being long-forgotten, has prompted a plethora of 21st-century critical studies. Thus Wiley-Blackell's A Companion to Sensation Fiction (2011), the first comprehensive guide to the sub-genre, while devoting three chapters to Wilkie Collins, gave five to Mary Elizabeth Braddon, one specifically to Aurora Floyd.

== Adaptations ==
In 1863, the same year as the novel was published, Aurora Floyd was adapted for the stage by Colin Henry Hazlewood and first performed at the Britannia Theatre Saloon in the Hoxton district just north of the City of London.

The script was subsequently published by Thomas Hailes Lacy as the 85th in his series Acting Edition of Plays. Tinsley also dramatised other works by Braddon, notably Lady Audley's Secret.

An American silent film adaptation of the book was released in 1912 to mixed reviews. It was directed by Theodore Marston and starred Florence La Badie in the title role.
