= The Venetians (novel) =

1893 novel by Mary Elizabeth Braddon

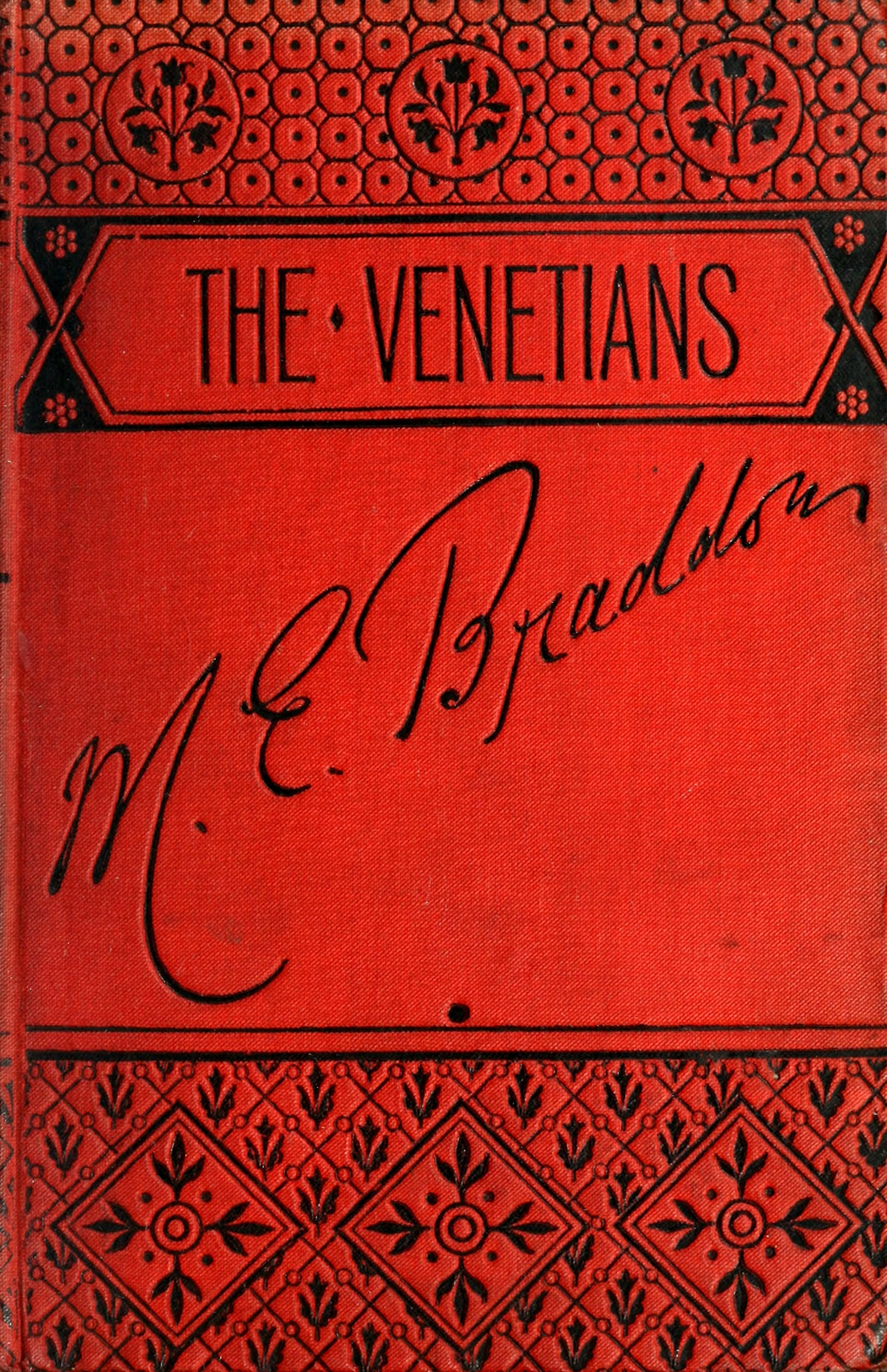
- Cover of the Simpkin, Marshall, Hamilton, Kent & Co. edition
- Author: Mary Elizabeth Braddon
- Language: English
- Genre: Sensation novel
- Publisher: Simpkin, Marshall, Hamilton, Kent & Co.
- Publication date: 1893
- Media type: Print
- Pages: 348 pp

The Venetians is an 1893 sensation novel by Mary Elizabeth Braddon. The plot follows the career of an English gentleman in the aftermath of a fatal brawl in Venice.

== Plot summary ==
John Vansittart is a young man of the landed gentry on a solo tour of Italy. In Venice during Carnival, he meets a beautiful peasant woman, Fiordelisa Vivanti, a lace-maker from Burano. She is the mistress of another Englishman, but tells John that her lover is away on business. While John and Lisa are dining at Caffè Florian, Lisa's lover suddenly appears and attacks John in a fit of jealousy. In the ensuing scuffle, John grabs a dagger he had just purchased as a souvenir, and stabs his rival, who dies instantly.

Shocked, John flees the scene, jumps into the lagoon, and climbs aboard a steamship just as it departs for Alexandria. On his way back to England, he finds that the murder attracted no significant attention and that he is apparently safe from prosecution. He feels regret and shame at his deed, more for the "ungentlemanly" use of a knife than the act of killing itself, and tells no one.

Three years later, at home in Sussex, John meets Eve Marchant and her sisters on the way to a ball. He is enchanted by the beautiful Eve and resolves to marry her, despite the fact that her dissolute father has squandered the family's fortunes. While courting Eve, John eavesdrops on a mysterious conversation between her and Wilfred Sefton, a wealthy but sinister neighbor. He learns that Sefton has been trying to trace the fate of Eve's elder brother Harold, who went missing after voyaging to Africa, and eventually learns that Harold was the man he killed in Venice, although Sefton wrongly believes that Harold was the murderer and does not realize John was involved. John marries Eve and resolves that Eve must never know that her husband is her brother's killer.

In London, John attends a performance of Faust and sees Lisa singing in the chorus. He discovers that she has moved to England to pursue a musical career, and forgives him for the murder. To assuage his guilt, John pays for a spacious flat for Lisa, her aunt, and the young child she bore after her lover's death, and hires a music teacher to train her voice. Meanwhile, Sefton has fallen in love with Lisa, who receives his overtures without committing herself. Sefton happens to see John with Lisa and wrongly assumes that they are lovers and that he is the father of Lisa's son. Lisa, on the other hand, is in love with John, but he rejects her advances, seeing her only as a friend.

John and Eve's life of wedded bliss is darkened by the illness of her little sister Peggy, a victim of consumption, who dies in spite of a medical evacuation to Cannes. When they return to London, John and Eve happen to cross paths with Sefton and Lisa on a river outing, and Eve becomes jealous after seeing Lisa's joyful recognition of John.

A complicated series of events - Eve's growing suspicion, Lisa's increasing success on the opera stage, Sefton's avowal of love to Lisa and her rejection of him, followed by his pursuit of Eve's sister Sophy - eventually lead to a crisis. Eve confronts Lisa and finally learns the truth of her brother's fate and her husband's complicity. Heartbroken, she declares she can no longer live with John.

Both John and Eve go into self-imposed exile - John to Mashonaland to lose himself in the African savannah, Eve to Normandy. Like her mother and sister, she develops consumption, and travels to Italy, eventually settling in Venice at the Hotel Danieli, where the police help her find her brother's grave. Dying, she learns that John is returning from Africa, and sends for him. He arrives in time for the two to reconcile and for him to nurse her in her last days.

== Analysis ==
Braddon's depiction of contemporary Venice has been compared to Ann Radcliffe's in The Mysteries of Udolpho as both a feminine object of male desire, and a source of women's artistic autonomy.
