= The Trail of the Serpent =

1861 novel by Mary Elizabeth Braddon

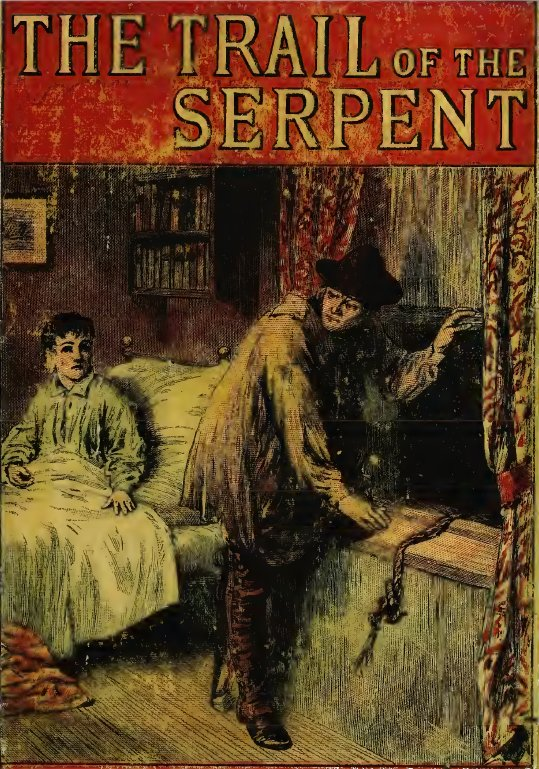
- 1890 cover of The Trail of the Serpent
- Author: Mary Elizabeth Braddon
- Original title: Three Times Dead; or, The Secret of the Heath
- Language: English
- Genre: Sensation novel
- Published: (As Three Times Dead) first published in 1860; (as The Trail of the Serpent) in March 1861, later serialized in the Halfpenny Journal from 1 August 1864 to 28 February 1865.
- Publisher: (As Three Times Dead) W&M Clark: London; (as The Trail of the Serpent) Ward, Lock: London.
- Publication place: England
- Media type: Print
- OCLC: 156851171
- Text: The Trail of the Serpent at Wikisource

The Trail of the Serpent is the first sensation novel by Mary Elizabeth Braddon, first published in 1861 as Three Times Dead; or, The Secret of the Heath. The story concerns the schemes of the orphan Jabez North to acquire an aristocratic fortune, and the efforts of Richard Marwood, aided by his friends, to prove his innocence in the murder of his uncle.

Portraying many themes associated with the sensation novel — including violence, potential bigamy and the lunatic asylum — it has also been hailed as the first British detective novel; plot devices and elements such as the detective's use of boy assistants, the planting of evidence on a corpse, and the use of disguise to fool the criminal, were later used by this school of fiction in the twentieth century.

The novel initially sold poorly. Braddon condensed and revised Three Times Dead on the advice of the London publisher John Maxwell; re-issued under its current title, the novel achieved greater success — it was serialized in 1864 and then reprinted several times in the following years.

== Synopsis ==
Richard Marwood returns to the home of his mother, Agnes, in Slopperton after an absence of seven years. His uncle, Montague Harding, having recently returned from the East Indies after amassing a large fortune, is also staying there. After a brief reconciliation, Richard leaves swiftly on the encouragement of Montague, who promises him help in turning around his hitherto dissolute lifestyle; on his train journey away from the town, however, he is apprehended by two detectives, Mr. Jinks and the mute Joseph Peters, who charge him with the murder of his uncle on the night of his departure. Peters comes to suspect that Richard is innocent of the murder, and in the trial that follows manages to arrange that he pleads insane; subsequently, Richard is interred in a lunatic asylum. Meanwhile, the orphaned schoolmaster Jabez North kills a child under his care after he threatens to reveal Jabez's suspicious activity on the night of the murder. Later encountering his twin brother, on his deathbed in a derelict neighborhood of Slopperton, he switches places with the dying man; after finding a body on the heath, the police declare Jabez North to have committed suicide.

In Paris, the Spanish heiress Valerie de Cevennes is discovered by Jabez (now under the name of Raymond de Marolles) in a secret marriage with an opera singer, Gaston de Lancy. With the assistance of the fortune-teller and chemist Laurent Blurosset and a mimic, Raymond manipulates Valerie into believing that Gaston has been unfaithful to her, and she poisons him for betraying her trust. In the aftermath of the poisoning, Raymond blackmails Valerie into marrying him.

Eight years later, Richard's confinement is interrupted by the arrival of Joseph Peters' son, Sloshy. (The child is in fact the offspring of Jabez, left to die by its mother when he abandoned her.) Together with Augustus Darley, a friend of Richard's, the pair effect an escape for the prisoner. Subsequently, Richard travels to London and rejoins his former compatriots, the 'Cherokees'; they are later joined by Joseph and the housemaid Kuppins, with whom the detective has brought up Sloshy. The group resolve to vindicate Richard's innocence in the murder of his uncle and to find the guilty person. Meanwhile, Raymond (now the Count de Marolles) has established a household in London with Valerie, now his wife, and her son from her former relationship with Gaston.

Richard and Joseph Peters make headway in confirming that Jabez and Raymond are the same person. Meanwhile, Raymond discovers that the Marquis de Cevennes, Valerie's uncle, is actually his father. Valerie uncovers Raymond's plot, including the use of the mimic to trick her; when she confronts Laurent, however, he reveals that she did not in fact poison Gaston but merely drugged him—after the incident he fled Paris for a military life in India, and goes under the name of Captain Lansdown. Valerie calls her uncle, the Marquis, to London; his paternal connection to Raymond is revealed when the pair confront one another, but the meeting is interrupted by an attempt to apprehend the latter (the evidence of his involvement in the murder having grown in the meantime). Raymond manages to escape them and flees London.

Joseph and Augustus gather more evidence from Slopperton, and visit the house where the murder took place (now vacated by Agnes). The group suspect that Raymond will be on board a ship bound for New York; they eventually find him inside a coffin due to be taken aboard, and he is apprehended. In the subsequent trial, Raymond is found guilty of Montague's murder and sentenced to be hanged; he kills himself before the sentence is carried out. Valerie again marries Gaston, now Captain Lansdown, whilst Richard marries Augustus' sister, Isabella, who supported him during the efforts to prove his innocence; the two couples travel to South America to start new lives there.

== Characters ==
- Jabez North — an orphaned schoolmaster in Slopperton. Later takes the assumed name of Raymond de Marolles, then the title of Count.
- Richard Marwood — the dissolute son of Agnes, who returns to her residence in Slopperton after an absence of seven years.
- Agnes Marwood — a widow and the mother of Richard.
- Montague Harding — Agnes' brother, who returns from the East Indies with a large fortune.
- Mr. Jinks — a detective with the Slopperton police force.
- Joseph Peters — a mute detective.
- Kuppins — stays with Joseph Peters to care for the abandoned orphan, Sloshy.
- Gaston de Lancy — an opera singer working in Paris; secretly married to Valerie de Cevennes. Later takes the name of Captain Lansdown after a period in India.
- Laurent Blurosset — a fortune-teller and chemist in Paris.
- Valerie de Cevennes — a Spanish heiress living in Paris.

== Composition ==
Braddon wrote about the composition and publication history of the novel in an essay that first appeared in 1893, entitled 'My First Novel: The Trail of the Serpent'.

== Reception ==
The Sporting Gazette remarked on the release of an 1866 edition of the novel by Ward, Lock, & Tyler:

Admirers of the highly wrought "sensational" school of novels, will find ample gratification in "The Trail of the Serpent," while the republication of this first essay is especially interesting as enabling readers of Miss Braddon's later novels to judge how much she has profited by time, study, and observation, and to note the progressive improvement in style and artistic construction so apparent in her more matured works.
