= Colin Henry Hazlewood =

English playwright

Colin Henry Hazlewood (1823– 31 May 1875) was an English playwright.

Hazlewood became a low comedian on the Lincoln, York and western circuits. In 1850, he wrote and produced at the City of London Theatre a farce entitled Who's the Victim? which was received with favour, and he commenced writing stories for the penny weekly publications. In 1851, he was engaged at the Surrey Theatre, appearing as Bob Blackberry in The Rover's Bride, and was next engaged by Nelson Lee and Johnson for the City of London Theatre as a low comedian. Here he remained ten years, producing numerous dramas, farces and burlesques, among his successes being The Bonnet Builders' Tea Party at the Royal Strand Theatre; Jenny Foster, the Sailor's Child and Jessie Vere, or the Return of the Wanderer, two dramas each in two acts, produced in 1854 and 1856 at the Britannia Saloon, where they had long runs; and Waiting for the Verdict, first given at the City of London Theatre.

Hazlewood wrote mainly for the Britannia and Pavilion Theatres, and is said to have been paid at the rate of about fifty shillings an act, with something extra for a very successful piece. He was the most prolific contributor of plays to the Britannia and his sources ranged from recently published novels and serialisations in such journals as The Family, The Herald and Bow Bells to juvenile literature, popular paintings and newspaper reports.

Among his most popular adaptations were versions of Mary Elizabeth Braddon's sensation novels Lady Audley's Secret (1862; dramatisation 1863) and Aurora Floyd (1863; dramatisation 1863).

He died at 44 Huntingdon Street, Haggerston, London, on 31 May 1875, aged 52, leaving two children, a son, Henry Colin Hazlewood (lessee and manager of the Star Theatre, Wolverhampton) and a daughter.

== Works ==
Thirty of Hazlewood's works were printed by Thomas Hailes Lacy's in his series Acting Edition of Plays).:

- Going to Chobham. A Farce, City of London Theatre, 1853 (No. 161)
- Jessie Vere, 1856 (No. 37)
- Jenny Foster, 1855 (No. 46)
- The Marble Bride, magical drama, Britannia Saloon (No. 47)
- The Chevalier of the Maison Rouge, drama, 1859 (No. 62)
- The House on the Bridge of Notre Dame, drama, Marylebone Theatre, 1861 (No. 74)
- The Harvest Storm, drama, Britannia Theatre, 1862 (No. 82)
- The Heart of Midlothian, drama, adjusted by C. Hazlewood, 1863 (No. 85)
- Aurora Floyd, drama, Britannia Theatre, 1863 (No. 85)
- The Mother's Dying Child, drama, Britannia Theatre, 1863 (No. 95)
- Clock on the Stairs, drama, Britannia Theatre, 1862 (No. 103)
- Capitola, or the Masked Mother and the Hidden Hand, drama, City of London Theatre, 1860 (No. 104)
- Poul a Dhoil, or the Fairy Man, drama, Britannia Theatre, 1865 (No. 114)
- Hop Pickers and Gipsies, drama, Britannia Theatre, 1869 (No. 126)
- Lizzie Lyle, or the Flower Makers of Finsbury, drama, Grecian Theatre, 1869 (No. 130)
- The Lost Wife, or a Husband's Confession, drama, Britannia Theatre, 1871 (No. 138)
- Leave it to Me, a farce, with Arthur Williams, Surrey Theatre, 1870 (No. 143)
- Waiting for the Verdict, or Falsely Accused, drama, City of London Theatre, 1859 (No. 147)
- Mary Edmondstone, drama, Britannia Theatre, 1862 (No. 1543
- The Staff of Diamonds, drama, Surrey Theatre, 1861 (No. 155)
- The Stolen Jewess, drama, Britannia Theatre, 1872 (No. 157)
- Ashore and Afloat, drama, Surrey Theatre, 1864;No. 158)
- Taking the Veil, or the Harsh Stepfather, drama, Britannia Theatre, 1870 (No. 158)
- The Bridal Wreath, drama, City of London Theatre, 1861 (No. 159)
- The Bitter Reckoning, drama, Britannia Theatre, 1871 (No. 160)
- The Headless Horseman, drama, Britannia Theatre, 1865 (No. 160)
- For Honour's Sake, drama, Britannia Theatre, 1873 (No. 161)
- Jessamy's Courtship, a farce, Philharmonic Theatre, 1875 (No. 163)
- Lady Audley's Secret, drama, Victoria Theatre, 1863 (Supplement No. 3)
- Never too Late to Mend, drama, Marylebone Theatre, 1859 (Supplement No. 1)

Others of his pieces had considerable popularity, viz.: Mary Price, Phillis Thorpe, Jerry Abershaw, Lilla, the Lost One, Our Tea Party, The Black Gondola, Trials of Poverty, Blanche and Perrinette, The Eagle's Nest, Lost Evidence, The Jewess of the Temple, The Traitor's Track, Life for a Life, The Forlorn Hope, Happiness at Home, Cast Aside, Aileen Asthore, The Lightning Flash, French Girl's Love and Inez Danton.
