= Sensation novel =

Literary genre of fiction that peaked in Great Britain in the 1850s-90s

The sensation novel, also sensation fiction, was a literary genre of fiction that achieved its peak popularity in Great Britain from the mid-1850s to the 1890s, centring on taboo material that was shocking to its readers. The material itself was a means of musing on contemporary social anxieties.

Its literary forebears included the melodramatic novels and the Newgate novels, which focused on tales woven around criminal biographies; it also drew on the Gothic, romance, and mass market genres. The genre's popularity paralleled an expanding book market and the growth of a reading public, by-products of the Industrial Revolution. Whereas romance and realism had traditionally been contradictory modes of literature, they were brought together in sensation fiction. The sensation novelists commonly wrote stories that were allegorical and abstract; the abstract nature of the stories gave the authors room to explore scenarios that wrestled with the social anxieties of the Victorian era. The loss of identity is seen in many sensation fiction stories because this was a common social anxiety; in Britain, there was an increased use in record keeping and therefore people questioned the meaning and permanence of identity. The social anxiety regarding identity is reflected in novels such as The Woman in White and Lady Audley's Secret.

Sensation fiction is commonly seen to have emerged as a definable genre in the wake of three novels: Wilkie Collins's The Woman in White (1860); Mrs. Henry Wood's East Lynne (1861); and Mary Elizabeth Braddon's Lady Audley's Secret (1862). Perhaps the earliest use of the term "sensation fiction" as a name for such novels appears in the 1861 edition of the Saunders, Otley, & co.'s Literary Budget.

Sensation novels were the precursor of pulp fiction, which were inexpensive fiction magazines that were published from 1896 until around 1955.

== Definition ==
The Victorian sensation novel has been variously defined as a "novel-with-a-secret" and as the sort of novel that combines "romance and realism" in a way that "strains both modes to the limit". More recently, Anna Peak has suggested that the Victorians themselves identified a wide range of works as "sensation novels" and that the connecting characteristic is the way such works represent lower-class characters: "one way of thinking of the sensation novel is as a genre that disrupts a middle-class perspective, whereas realist novels (that famously middle-class genre), even when including lower-class characters, deal with them in a way that usually does not similarly disrupt a middle-class perspective."

== Influences ==
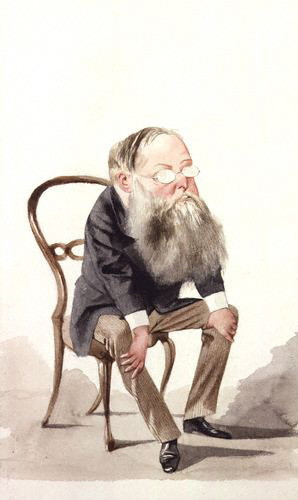
Captioned "The Novelist who invented Sensation", caricature of Wilkie Collins in Vanity Fair, 3 February 1872

Sensation novelists drew on the influences of melodrama, Gothicism, and the Newgate novel to explore themes considered provocative by societal norms and to question the artificiality of identity. In the 1860s, the sensation novels and theatre became closely intertwined; many of the famous sensation novelists also wrote for the stage. Dickens, Reade, and Collins all wrote and acted for the theatre, and the stage helped many novelists gain recognition as authors. Peter Brooks defines melodrama as an attempt "to find, to articulate, to demonstrate, to 'prove' the existence of a moral universe that, though put into question and masked by villainy and perversions of judgement, does exist and can be made to assert its presence."

The Gothic influence on the sensation novel is described by Laurence Talairach-Vielmas thus:

secrecy and the body go hand in hand, and the more sensation novels highlight the elusiveness or artificiality of human identity, the more hair-raising Gothic loci appear as the ultimate place where fragment of truth can be recollected and reunited and story rewritten.

A common Gothic influence seen in the sensation novels is the search for a secret. The sensation novel puts a modern spin on the classic Gothic stories by placing the stories in contemporary settings and this produces the effect of creating a terror that is real and believable.

Sensation novels also drew influence from the Newgate novels that were popular during the 1830s and 40s; similarly to the sensation novel, Newgate novels created much controversy and debate. Authors of both genres found inspiration in newspaper police reports; the crime mysteries of the sensation novels, however, were less interested in actually catching the criminal and instead focused more on the criminal's identity and how they became a criminal.

== Themes and reception ==
Typically the sensation novel focused on shocking subject matter including adultery, robbery, disguise, revenge, kidnapping, insanity, bigamy, forgery, seduction and murder. It distinguished itself from other contemporary genres, including the Gothic novel, by setting these themes in ordinary, familiar and often domestic settings, thereby undermining the common Victorian-era assumption that sensational events were something foreign and divorced from comfortable middle-class life. W. S. Gilbert satirised these works in his 1871 comic opera A Sensation Novel. For Anthony Trollope, however, the best novels should be "at the same time realistic and sensational...and both in the highest degree".

When sensation novels burst upon a quiescent England these novels became immediate best sellers, surpassing all previous book sales records. However, highbrow critics writing in academic journals of the day decried the phenomenon and criticised its practitioners (and readers) in the harshest terms; John Ruskin perhaps provided the most thoughtful criticism in his 'Fiction – Fair and Foul'. Some scholars speculate that the notoriety of the genre may have contributed to its popularity. Henry Longueville Mansel from the Quarterly described the sensation novel as "extremely provocative of that sensation in the palate and throat which is a premonitory symptom of nausea".

== Notable examples ==
Date	Title	Author
1854	Hide and Seek	Wilkie Collins
1857	The Dead Secret	Wilkie Collins
1860	The Woman in White	Wilkie Collins
1861	East Lynne	Mrs Henry Wood
1861	The Trail of the Serpent	Mary Elizabeth Braddon
1861	The Old Roman Well	Anonymous
1862	Lady Audley's Secret	Mary Elizabeth Braddon
1862	Ashcombe Churchyard	Evelyn Benson
1862	Passages in the Life of a Fast Young Lady	Elizabeth Caroline Grey
1862	No Name	Wilkie Collins
1863	Aurora Floyd	Mary Elizabeth Braddon
1863	Nobly False	James McGrigor Allan
1864	The Shadow of Ashlydyat	Mrs Henry Wood
1864	Uncle Silas	Sheridan Le Fanu
1865–1866	Griffith Gaunt	Charles Reade
1866	Armadale	Wilkie Collins
1867	Cometh Up as a Flower	Rhoda Broughton
1869	Foul Play	Charles Reade
1869	Cora, or, The Romance of Three Years	Gertrude Fenton
1870	Man and Wife	Wilkie Collins
1871	A Terrible Temptation	Charles Reade
1871	Desperate Remedies	Thomas Hardy
1875	The Law and the Lady	Wilkie Collins
1879	The Cloven Foot	Mary Elizabeth Braddon
1881	The Black Robe	Wilkie Collins
1893	The Venetians	Mary Elizabeth Braddon
1894	Trilby	George du Maurier

== Legacy ==
Neo-Victorian novels, such as Celia Fremlin's The Hours Before Dawn (1958) and Eleanor Catton's The Luminaries (2013), have been seen to draw on the conventions of sensation fiction. The Luminaries includes uses of "suspect wills and forged documents, secret marriages, illegitimacy and opium." Sarah Waters stated that her third novel Fingersmith (2002) is meant as a tribute to the sensation novel genre.

== See also ==
- Victorian literature
- Yellow-back
