= Mary Elizabeth Braddon =

English popular novelist (1835–1915)

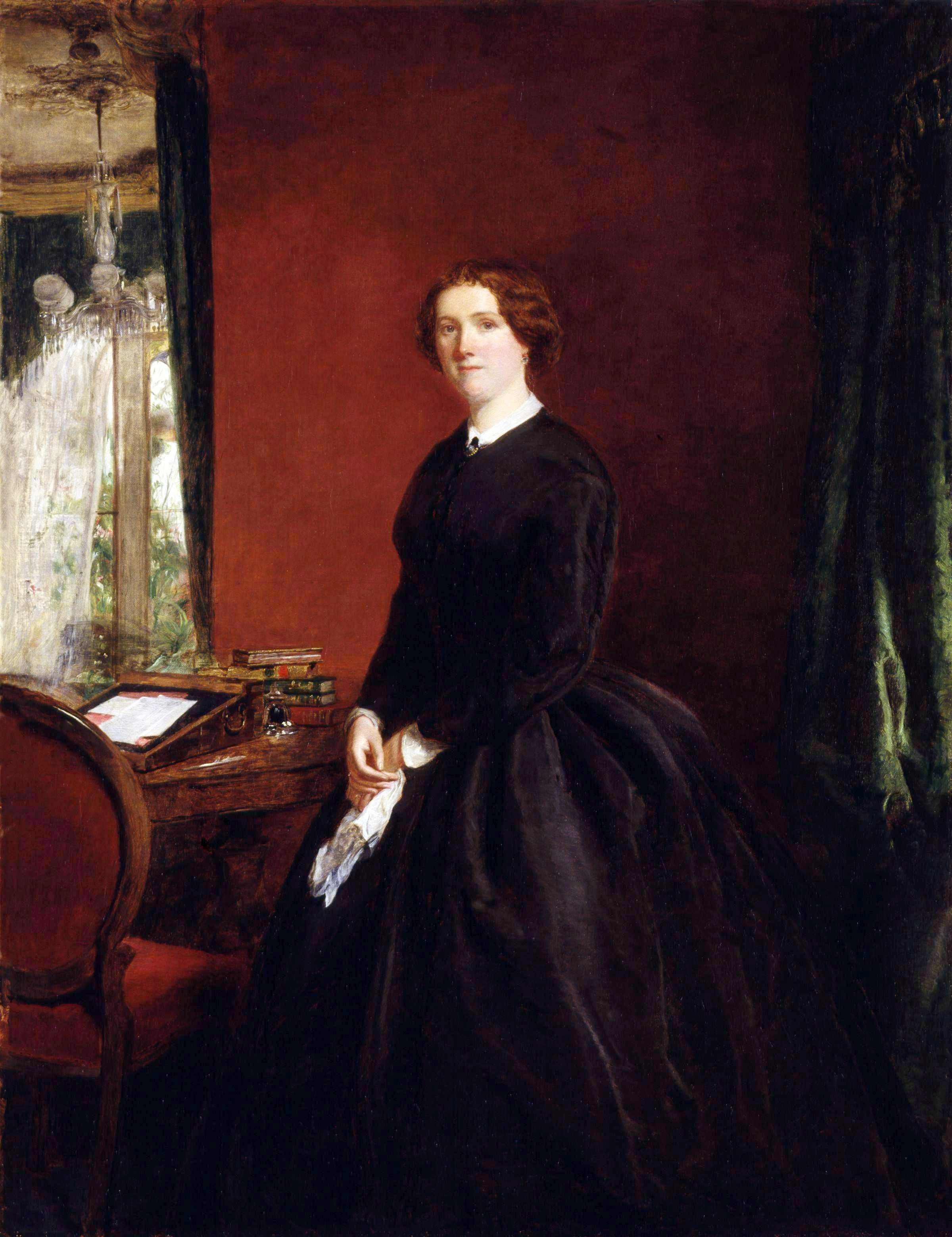
- Portrait of Mary Elizabeth Braddon by William Powell Frith, 1865
- Born: 4 October 1835; Soho, London, England
- Died: 4 February 1915 (aged 79); Richmond, Surrey
- Occupation: Novelist
- Spouse: John Maxwell
- Relatives: Edward Braddon (brother)
- Writing career
- Years active: 1860—1910
- Genre: Sensation novels
- Notable works: Lady Audley's Secret (1862); Aurora Floyd (1863)

Mary Elizabeth Braddon (4 October 1835 – 4 February 1915) was an English popular novelist of the Victorian era. She is best known for her 1862 novel Lady Audley's Secret, which is considered one of the foundational examples of sensation fiction. She is known for her focus on bigamous relationships in her novels, as well as her illegitimate marriage to John Maxwell.

Aside from writing, Braddon worked as an actress for eight years as a way to support herself and her mother. After establishing herself as a successful writer, she worked as a magazine editor and publisher. Braddon founded the magazine Belgravia in 1866.

The Mary Elizabeth Braddon Association was established in 2014 to pay tribute to Braddon's life and work. Various dramatisations have been made of her novels.

== Life and career ==
=== Early life and family ===
Mary Elizabeth Braddon was born the youngest of three children on 4 October 1835 in Soho, London. In 1840 her mother, Fanny (White) Braddon, left Braddon's father, Henry Braddon, due to his infidelities. Her brother, Edward Braddon, left for India in 1847. He eventually moved to Australia, where he became Premier of Tasmania. That same year her sister, Maggie Braddon, married Antonion Cartighoni and moved to Naples. Braddon and her mother moved to the English provinces in 1852, where she began a career in acting to support herself and her mother.

=== Acting ===
Between 1852 and 1860, Braddon worked as an actor. She travelled the provinces as an actress under the supervision of her mother. She acted in a variety of dramas, including Shakespearean plays, pantomimes, comedies, burlesques, and topical dramas about India and the Crimea. Braddon also took roles in well-known melodramas such as Black-Eyed Susan and Charles Reade's works, which would later be transformed into sensation novels. Despite her enthusiasm and dedication towards theatre, she gradually turned her focus towards writing novels due to a lack of leading roles and mixed performance reviews. Many of the roles she played were minor, yet profitable enough to support herself and her mother.

As an actress, Braddon befriended Clara and Adelaide Biddles. Adelaide noted that Braddon was an avid reader, and that her interest in acting waned as she began writing novels.

=== Relationship with John Maxwell ===
Braddon met John Maxwell (1824–1895), a publisher of periodicals, in April 1861 and moved in with him later that year. However, Maxwell was already married with five children to Mary Ann Crowley. Crowley lived with her family while Maxwell and Braddon lived as husband and wife. In 1864, Maxwell attempted to legitimize their relationship by telling the newspapers that they were legally married. However, Crowley's brother-in-law Richard Brinsley Knowles exposed Maxwell's lie by informing the papers that Crowley was alive. Crowley died in 1874, allowing Braddon and Maxwell to marry at St. Bride's Church on Fleet Street.

Braddon acted as a stepmother to Maxwell and Crowley's five children, and had six additional children with Maxwell. Their names were Gerald, Fanny, Francis, William, Winifred Rosalie, and Edward Herry Harrington.

=== Death and legacy ===
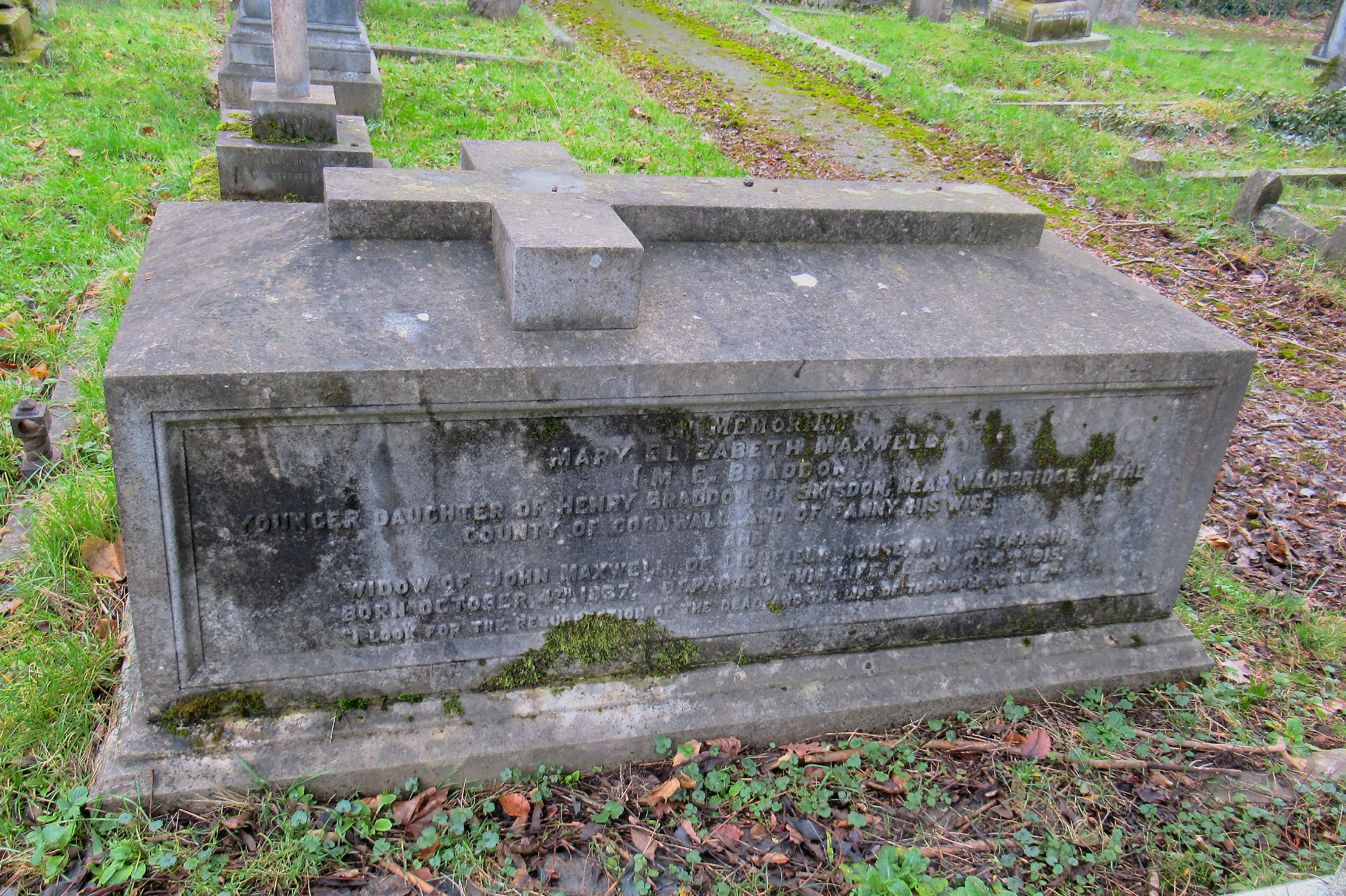
Tomb of Mary Elizabeth Maxwell in Richmond Cemetery

Braddon died on 4 February 1915 in Richmond (then in Surrey) and is interred in Richmond Cemetery. Richmond parish church has a commemorative plaque in Braddon's honor titled "Miss Braddon". In 1936, her home, Lichfield House, was replaced by a block of flats known as Lichfield Court. A number of nearby streets are named after characters in her novels – her husband was a property developer in the area.

Her eldest daughter, Fanny Margaret Maxwell (1863–1955), married the naturalist Edmund Selous on 13 January 1886. In 1923, Fanny founded and became the first president of a local branch of the Woman's Institute in Wyke Castle.

Her second eldest son was the novelist William Babington Maxwell (1866–1939).

Michael Sadleir wrote a critical essay on Braddon's work in his book Things Past in 1944. In 2014, the Mary Elizabeth Braddon Association was founded to pay tribute to Braddon's life and work.

== Writing and publishing ==
Braddon wrote more than eighty novels. She is most famous for her bestselling novel Lady Audley's Secret (1862). In July of 1861, Braddon published the first chapters of the novel serially in Robin Goodfellow, a literary magazine owned by Maxwell. Later chapters were published in Sixpenny Magazine. Lady Audley's Secret was then republished as a novel. In its first year of publication, the novel sold through nine editions. It has remained in print since its publication. The novel has been adapted into films and plays several times. The first stage adaptation opened in London during the winter of 1863. Braddon's other best-known novel, Aurora Floyd, was published serially the same year in Temple Bar. Because both novels featured a woman trapped in a bigamous relationship, they have been referred to as Braddon's "bigamy novels".

=== Magazine editing ===
Braddon was a magazine publisher in addition to her position as a writer. She founded the magazine Belgravia in 1866, which presented readers with serialised sensation novels, poems, travel narratives, biographies, and essays on fashion, history and science. The magazine also featured illustrations and was accessible to a broader audience. Braddon's work in Belgravia improved the reputation of the sensation genre by showcasing it in an intentional way. Literary scholar Kate Mattacks argues that Braddon was trapped in the sensational formula of Lady Audley's Secret-- stories that maintained her income but hurt her artistic credibility. However, some scholars have argued that examining Braddon's work in Belgravia makes it clear that Braddon's use of sensation was a deliberate and empowering choice rather than a limitation to her authorship.

Braddon also edited the Temple Bar magazine.

== Literary themes and styles ==
In the essay "Fictions of Sensation" in the Steel True, Blade Straight 2023 Annual, the formula of Braddon's sensation novels is summarised in the following terms: "The books begin with a wedding, usually between a mysterious heroine and a wealthy countryman, before rambling off into country-house romance, and being interrupted by a horrible crime, the solution of which is always clearer to the reader than to the characters, before a final explanation involving some form of bigamy is given. The bigamy is most crucial, and Braddon carries this theme to such a point of obsession that the reader begins to wonder."

Braddon wrote across multiple genres. She wrote several works of supernatural fiction, including the pact with the devil story Gerard or The World, the Flesh, and the Devil (1891), and the ghost stories "The Cold Embrace", "Eveline's Visitant" and "At Chrighton Abbey". From the 1930s onwards, these stories were often anthologised in collections such as Montague Summers's The Supernatural Omnibus (1931) and Fifty Years of Ghost Stories (1935). Braddon also wrote historical fiction: In High Places depicts the youth of Charles I; London Pride focuses on Charles II; Mohawks is set during the reign of Queen Anne; Ishmael is set at the time of Napoleon III's rise to power.

Revealing key plot twists—or spoilers—became a tactic used to undermine the sensation fiction's reputation and popularity. Braddon and other sensation novelists such as Wilkie Collins attempted to counter these criticisms by urging reviewers not to reveal their stories' hidden secrets.

== Works ==
This list is not exhaustive. It is based on Robert Lee Wolff's biography of Braddon, the British Library catalogue, the Jarndyce catalogue Women's Writers 1795–1927. Part I: A–F (Summer 2017), and other sources. Braddon's work is in the public domain and much of it has been transcribed by Project Gutenberg. Several contemporary French translations have been digitised by Gallica.

- Three Times Dead, or The Trail of the Serpent (1860), known since the 1861 reissue as The Trail of the Serpent
- Ralph the Bailiff, novella (1861 in St. James's Magazine, 1867 in book form with other short fiction)
- The Lady Lisle, novella (1861 in The Welcome Guest, 1862 in book form)
- The Lawyer's Secret, novella (1861 in The Welcome Guest, 2009 in book form)
- The Black Band, or The Mysteries of Midnight (1861–1862 in The Halfpenny Journal, 1877 in book form)
- The Octoroon, or The Lily of Louisiana (1861–1862 in The Halfpenny Journal, 1878 in book form, U.S. only)
- Lady Audley's Secret (1862)
- John Marchmont's Legacy (1862–1864 in Temple Bar, 1863 in book form, 1866 in a new edition with minor revisions)
- The Captain of the Vulture (1863)
- Aurora Floyd (1863)
- Eleanor's Victory (1863)
- The Factory Girl, or All Is Not Gold that Glitters, A Romance of Real Life (1863 in The Halfpenny Journal, 2025 in book form — a scholarly edition from the University of Wales Press)
- Henry Dunbar: The Story of an Outcast (1864)
- The Doctor's Wife (1864)
- Only a Clod (1865)
- Sir Jasper's Tenant (1865)
- The Lady's Mile (1866)
- Birds of Prey (1867)
- Circe (1867)
- Rupert Godwin (1867)
- Run to Earth (1868)
- Dead-Sea Fruit (1868)
- Charlotte's Inheritance (1868)
- Fenton's Quest (1871)
- To the Bitter End (1872)
- Robert Ainsleigh (1872)
- Lucius Davoren, or Publicans and Sinners (1873)
- Milly Darrell, and Other Tales (1873)
- Griselda (1873, drama)
- Strangers and Pilgrims (1873)
- Lost For Love (1874)
- Taken at the Flood (1874)
- A Strange World (1875)
- Hostages to Fortune (1875)
- Joshua Haggard's Daughter (1876)
- Weavers and Weft, or In Love's Nest (1876)
- Dead Men's Shoes (1876)
- An Open Verdict (1878)
- The Cloven Foot (1879)
- Vixen (1879)
- Just as I am (1880)
- The Story of Barbara: Her Splendid Misery, and Her Gilded Cage (1880)
- Asphodel (1881)
- Mount Royal (1882)
- Phantom Fortune (1883)
- The Golden Calf (1883)
- Ishmael (1884)
- Flower and Weed and other tales (1884)
- Wyllard's Weird (1885)
- Mohawks (1886)
- One Thing Needful (1886)
- Aunt Belinda (1886), later reissued as The Good Hermione: A Story for the Jubilee Year
- Under the Red Flag and Other Tales (1886)
- Cut by the County (1887)
- Like and Unlike (1887)
- The Fatal Three (1888)
- The Day Will Come] (1889)
- One Life, One Love (1890)
- Gerard, or The World, the Flesh and the Devil (1891)
- The Venetians (1893)
- All Along the River (1893)
- The Christmas Hirelings (1894)
- Thou Art The Man (1894)
- Sons of Fire (1895)
- London Pride, or When the World was Younger (1896)
- Good Lady Ducayne (1896)
- Rough Justice (1898)
- In High Places (1898)
- His Darling Sin (1899)
- The Infidel (1900)
- A Lost Eden (1904)
- The Rose of Life (1905)
- The White House (1906)
- Dead Love Has Chains (1907)
- During Her Majesty's Pleasure (1908)
- Our Adversary (1909)
- Beyond These Voices (1910)
- Miranda (1913)

Braddon serialised other novels anonymously in The Halfpenny Journal that have not, so far, appeared in book form: The White Phantom (1862–1863); Oscar Bertrand, or The Idiot of the Mountain (1863–1864), sequel to The Black Band; The Banker's Secret (1864–1865); and possibly Woman's Revenge, or The Captain of the Guard (1862), although her authorship of the last is not certain.

Her novel Circe (1867) was published under the pseudonym Babington White.

R. D. Blackmore's anonymous sensation novel Clara Vaughan (1864) has been wrongly attributed to Braddon by some critics.

== Dramatisations ==
Several of Braddon's works have been dramatised, including:

- Aurora Floyd, by Colin Henry Hazlewood, first performed at Britannia Theatre Saloon, London, 1863.
- "The Cold Embrace", starring Jonathan Firth, BBC Radio 4, 2009.
- Lady Audley's Secret, by Colin Henry Hazlewood, first performed at the Victoria Theatre, London, 1863.
- Lady Audley's Secret, starring Theda Bara, Fox Film Corp., 1915.
- Lady Audley's Secret, starring Neve McIntosh, Kenneth Cranham, and Steven Mackintosh, PBS Mystery! 2000.
