= Rhoda Broughton =

Welsh novelist and short story writer (1840-1920)

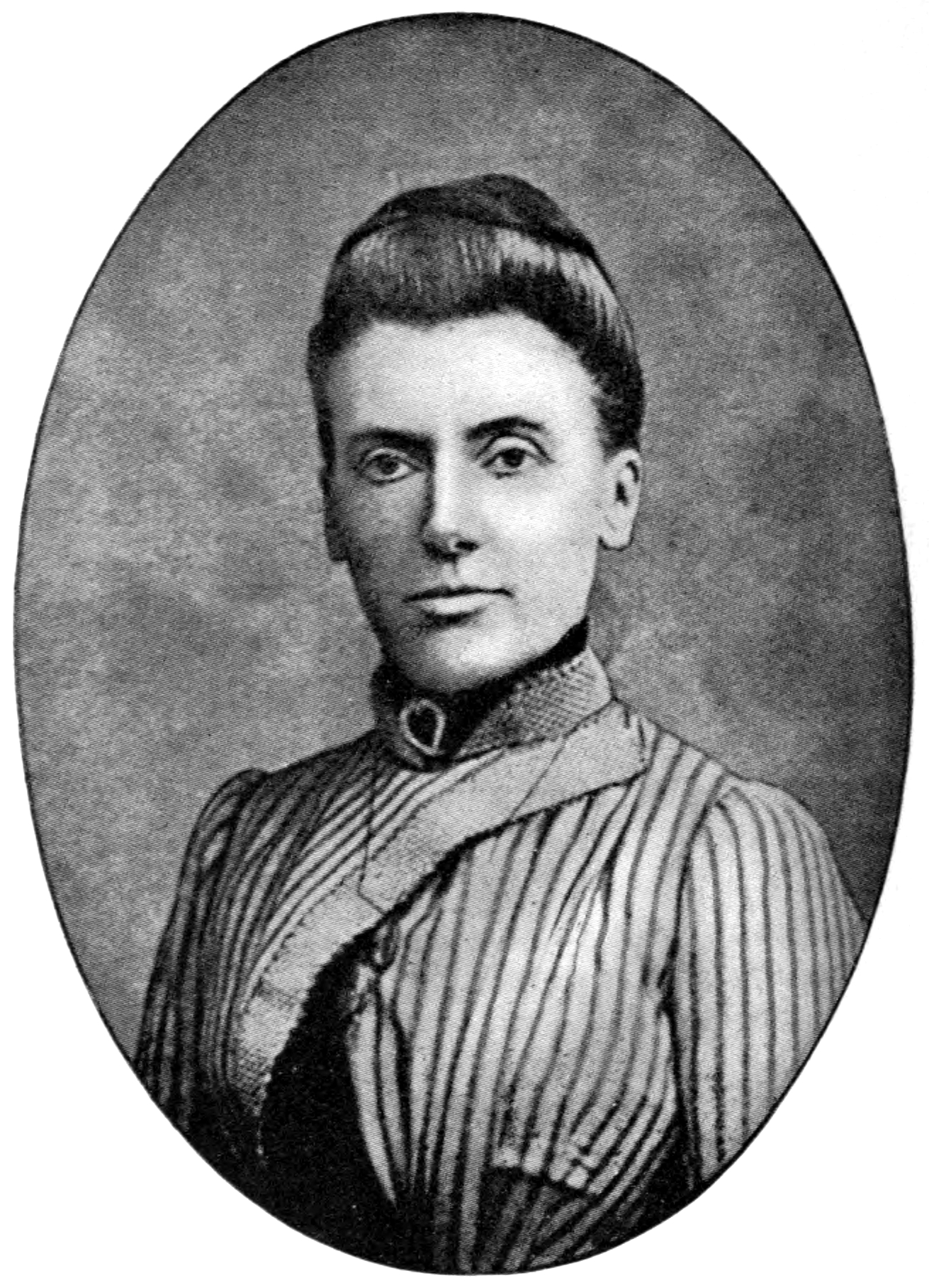
- Born: 29 November 1840; Denbigh, Wales
- Died: 5 June 1920 (aged 79); Headington Hill, Oxfordshire, England
- Occupation: Author
- Years active: 1867–1920

Rhoda Broughton (29 November 1840 – 5 June 1920) was a Welsh novelist and short story writer. Her early novels earned a reputation for sensationalism, so that her later, stronger work tended to be neglected by critics, although she was called a queen of the circulating libraries. Her most famous novel is probably Cometh Up as a Flower (1867). Her novel Dear Faustina (1897) has been noted for its homoeroticism. Her novel Lavinia (1902) depicts a seemingly "unmanly" young man, who wishes he had been born as a woman. Broughton descended from the Broughton baronets, as a granddaughter of the 8th baronet. She was a niece of Sheridan le Fanu, who helped her to start her literary career. She was a long-time friend of fellow writer Henry James and was noted for her adversarial relationship with both Lewis Carroll and Oscar Wilde.

== Life ==
Rhoda Broughton was born in Denbigh in North Wales on 29 November 1840, the daughter of the Rev. Delves Broughton, youngest son of the Rev. Sir Henry Delves-Broughton, 8th baronet, and Jane Bennett, daughter of a leading Irish barrister, George Bennett. Her aunt, Susanna Bennett, married the well-known fiction writer Sheridan le Fanu.

Rhoda Broughton developed a taste for literature as a young girl, especially poetry. She was influenced by William Shakespeare, as frequent quotations and allusions throughout her works show. Presumably, after reading The Story of Elizabeth by Anne Isabella Thackeray Ritchie, she had the idea of trying her own talent. She produced her first work within six weeks. Parts of this novel she took with her on a visit to her uncle Sheridan le Fanu, himself a successful author, who was highly pleased with it and assisted her in having it published – her first two novels appeared in 1867 in his Dublin University Magazine. Le Fanu also introduced her to the publisher Richard Bentley, who refused her first novel on the grounds of it being improper material, but accepted the second. Broughton in turn introduced Mary Cholmondeley to her publishers in about 1887. Broughton's writing style was to influence other writers like Mary Cecil Hay, who is thought to have a similar style of dialogue.

Bentley also published a novel of hers which he had initially rejected. She made an effort to employ the popular three-decker form and adapt it to the assumed taste of Bentley's readers. Their professional relationship lasted until the Bentley publishing house was taken over by Macmillan in the late 1890s. By then Broughton had published 14 novels over a period of 30 years. Ten of these were in the three-volume form, which she found hard to comply with. After the commercial failure of Alas!, for which she received her highest-ever payment at the height of her career, she decided to write one-volume novels instead. This was the form for her finest works. However, she never shed her early reputation for creating fast heroines with easy morals, as in her early novels, and was still dismissed as merely slight and sensational.

After the take-over, Broughton remained with Macmillan and published another six novels there, but by then her popularity was declining. In a review published in The New York Times of 12 May 1906, a certain K. Clark complained that her latest novel was hard to procure and wondered why such a fine writer was so little appreciated.

After 1910 she moved to Stanley, Paul & Co, which published three novels of hers. Her last, A Fool in Her Folly (1920), was printed posthumously with an introduction by a long-time friend and fellow writer, Marie Belloc Lowndes. This work can be seen as partially autobiographical and may have been written at an earlier time, but suppressed for personal reasons. It deals with the experiences of a young writer and reflects her own, as does her previous novel A Beginner. The manuscript is in her own handwriting, which is unusual, as some previous work had been dictated to an assistant.

Broughton's final years were spent at Headington Hill, near Oxford where she died on 5 June 1920, aged 79. A blue plaque was unveiled on her home there on 22 October 2020.

== Works ==
Somerset Maugham, in his short story "The Round Dozen" (1924, also known as "The Ardent Bigamist") observes: "I remember Miss Broughton telling me once that when she was young people said her books were fast and when she was old they said they were slow, and it was very hard since she had written exactly the same sort of book for forty years."

Rhoda Broughton never married, and some critics assume that a disappointed attachment was the impulse that made her try her pen instead of some other literary work like that of Mrs Thackeray Ritchie. Much of her life she spent with her sister, Eleanor Newcome, until the latter's death in Richmond in 1895. In this she followed the tradition of great lady novelists like Maria Edgeworth, Jane Austen or Susan Ferrier. But there are other merits that cause her to be placed in such high company. In his article on her Richard C. Tobias calls her "the leading woman novelist in England between the death of George Eliot and the beginning of Virginia Woolf's career". He compares her work with other novelists of the time and concludes that hers reaches a much higher quality.

The Game and the Candle (1899) is like Jane Austen's Persuasion (1818) rewritten: this time the heroine has married for rational reasons and is freed in the beginning for her true love, which reason forbade her to marry years before. Her dying husband's last will obliges her to decide between love and fortune. However, a renewed encounter with her former lover forces her to see it was actually a good thing she had not married him. His love turns out to be too shallow for her happiness. The novel is one written by a mature and wise woman, who has seen the world.

In A Beginner (1894) Broughton devises a young writer who has her work secretly published and then later torn apart by unknowing people right in front of her face. The novel deals with the moral issues of writing and whether it is appropriate for a young woman to write romantic or even erotic fiction. Scylla or Charybdis? (1895) has a mother hiding her infamous past from her son and obsessing about his love even to the extent of being jealous of other women, a plot to some extent anticipating Lawrence's Sons and Lovers (1913). The novel questions social conventions in revealing how destructive they can be to quiet people who might have once stepped aside from the proper path. In a different way the same criticism is being made in Foes in Law (1900), where the main question is which lifestyle is the one productive of the highest degree of happiness: the conventional one or one that accords with private needs.

Her next novel, Dear Faustina (1897), deals with a heroine drawn to a girl of the New Woman type. This New Woman Faustina cares nothing for social conventions and dedicates her time to fighting social injustice. Or so it seems at first sight, but the reader gets the feeling that Faustina is more interested in getting to know and impress other young women, which can also be interpreted as criticism of the New Woman as a type. The homoerotic touch reappears in Lavinia (1902), but this time it is a young man who is frequently made to appear unmanly and even utter the wish to have been born a woman. That novel also concerns itself with Britain's craze for war heroes. Very subtly it questions dominant notions of masculinity.

Always an important feature in all her novels is criticism of woman's role and position in society. Very often Broughton's women are strong characters and with them, she manages to subvert traditional images of femininity. This culminates in A Waif's Progress (1905), in which Broughton creates a married couple who turn everything traditional upside down, with the wife fulfilling the stereotype of an older, rich husband.

Broughton's collection Tales for Christmas Eve (1873, also known as Twilight Stories) was a collection of five ghost stories. Robert S. Hadji describes her "short ghost fiction as not as terrifying as her uncle's, but it is skilfully wrought". Hadji also describes Broughton's story "Nothing But the Truth" (1868, vt. "The Truth, the Whole Truth, and Nothing but the Truth") as "one of her cleverest stories".

During her lifetime, Broughton was one of the queens of the circulating libraries. Her fame and success was such that some found it worthwhile to satirise her in works like "Groweth Down Like A Toadstool" or "Gone Wrong" by "Miss Rody Dendron". It is a pity we do not know how she took such things. Perhaps she stood up to them as she did to people like Oscar Wilde or Lewis Carroll, who bore her no love. The latter is said to have declined an invitation because Broughton would be present. The former found a match in her when it came to ironical comments in Oxford society, where she was not liked much, either, due to her ridicule of that set in her novel Belinda (1883). Nevertheless, she also had many friends in literary circles, the most prominent of them being Henry James, with whom she stayed friends until his death in 1916. According to Helen C. Black, James visited Broughton every evening, when they were both in London.

== Cultural allusion ==
"Black Sheep retreated to the nursery and read Cometh up as a Flower with deep and uncomprehending interest. He had been forbidden to open it on account of its 'sinfulness'..." From Rudyard Kipling's short story, Baa Baa Black Sheep, published 1888.

== Partial bibliography ==
- Not Wisely, But Too Well – (1867)
- Cometh Up as a Flower – (1867)
- Red as a Rose is She – (1870)
- Good-bye, Sweetheart! – (1872)
- Nancy – (1873)
- Tales for Christmas Eve – (1873); republished as Twilight Stories (1879)
- Joan – (1876)
- Second Thoughts – (1880)
- Belinda – (1883)
- Doctor Cupid – (1886)
- Alas! – (1890)
- A Widower Indeed (With Elizabeth Bisland) – (1891)
- Mrs. Bligh – (1892)
- A Beginner – (1893)
- Scylla or Charybdis? – (1895)
- Dear Faustina – (1897)
- The Game and the Candle – (1899)
- Foes in Law – (1900)
- Lavinia – (1902)
- A Waif's Progress – (1905)
- Mamma – (1908)
- The Devil and the Deep Sea – (1910)
- Between Two Stools – (1912)
- Concerning a Vow – (1914)
- A Thorn in the Flesh – (1917)
- A Fool in her Folly – (1920)

=== Short stories ===
- "The Truth, the Whole Truth, and Nothing But the Truth". By the author of "Cometh Up as a Flower". 1868 February, Temple Bar, Vol. 22, pp. 340–348
- "The Man with the Nose". By Rhoda Broughton, author of "Cometh Up as a Flower." 1872 October, Temple Bar, Vol. 36, pp. 328–342
- "Behold, it was a Dream!" Unsigned. 1872 November, Temple Bar, Vol. 36, pp. 503–516
- "Poor Pretty Bobby". By Rhoda Broughton. 1872 December, Temple Bar, Vol. 37, pp. 61–78
- "Under the Cloak". By Rhoda Broughton. 1873 January, Temple Bar, Vol. 37, pp. 205–212
- Tales of Christmas Eve. 1873 Bentley; Twilight Stories. 1879 Bentley
  - The Truth, the Whole Truth, and Nothing But the Truth (1868)
  - The Man with the Nose (1872)
  - Behold, it was a Dream! (1872)
  - Poor Pretty Bobby (1872)
  - Under the Cloak (1873)
- "What it Meant". By Rhoda Broughton. 1881 September, Temple Bar, Vol. 63, pp. 82–94
- Betty's Visions. By Rhoda Broughton, author of "Nancy," "Red as a Rose is She," &c. 1883 December 15, 22, 29, The Bristol Mercury and Daily Post, p. 6
- Mrs. Smith of Longmains. By Rhoda Broughton, author of "Cometh Up as a Flower," "Good-Bye Sweetheart," "Not Wisely, But Too Well," "Nancy," "Red as a Rose is She," &c., &c. 31 October, 7 November 1885, Sheffield and Rotherham Independent, Supplement pp. 2–3, p. 3
- Betty's Visions and Mrs. Smith of Longmains. 1886, Routledge Paperback; 1889, Blackett
- "Betty's Visions" (1883)
- "Mrs. Smith of Longmains" (1885)
- "Was She Mad?" By Rhoda Broughton. 1888 December 26, The Belfast News-Letter, p. 3
- "A Home of Rest". By Rhoda Broughton [article]. 1891 September, Temple Bar, Vol. 93, pp. 68–72
- Across the Threshold. By Rhoda Broughton, author of "Red as a Rose is She," "Nancy," &c. 1892 June 11, The Penny Illustrated Paper Vol. 62, pp. 372–373
- His Serene Highness. Signed Rhoda Broughton. 1893 May, in The Pall Mall Magazine Vol.1, pp. 8–19
- "Rent Day". By Rhoda Broughton, author of "Good-Bye Sweetheart", etc. 1893 June, Temple Bar, Vol. 98, pp. 228–248
- "A Christmas Outing" 1895, The Lady's Pictorial Christmas Number
- "A Stone's Throw" 1897 May, The Lady's Realm Vol. 2, pp. 11–17
- "In Five Acts". By Rhoda Broughton. 1897 July 10, The Scranton Republican, p. 10. 1901 February, The Ludgate Series 2, Vol. 11, pp. 340–351
