= Marshall Farnum =

American actor

- Marshall Farnum in 1916
- Born: December 19, 1879; Natick, Massachusetts, United States
- Died: February 19, 1917 (aged 37); Prescott, Arizona, United States
- Other name: "Ding"
- Occupations: Actor, Director
- Years active: 1913–1917 (film)
- Family: William Farnum (brother); Dustin Farnum (brother)

Marshall Farnum (December 19, 1879 – February 19, 1917) was an American actor and film director. Marshall was the youngest of the three Farnum boys, Dustin Farnum and William Farnum. Having directed first on stage, from 1913 he established himself as a film director at prominent companies such as Fox Film and World Film. He died of Tuberculosis at the age of thirty seven.

== Selected filmography ==
- The Spoilers (1914, actor)
- Lady Audley's Secret (1915)
- Driftwood (1916)
- The House of Mirrors (1916)
- The Tides of Fate (1917)

== Bibliography ==
- Roy Liebman. Broadway Actors in Films, 1894-2015. McFarland, 2017.
