= Jarndyce Antiquarian Booksellers =

Bookseller in London

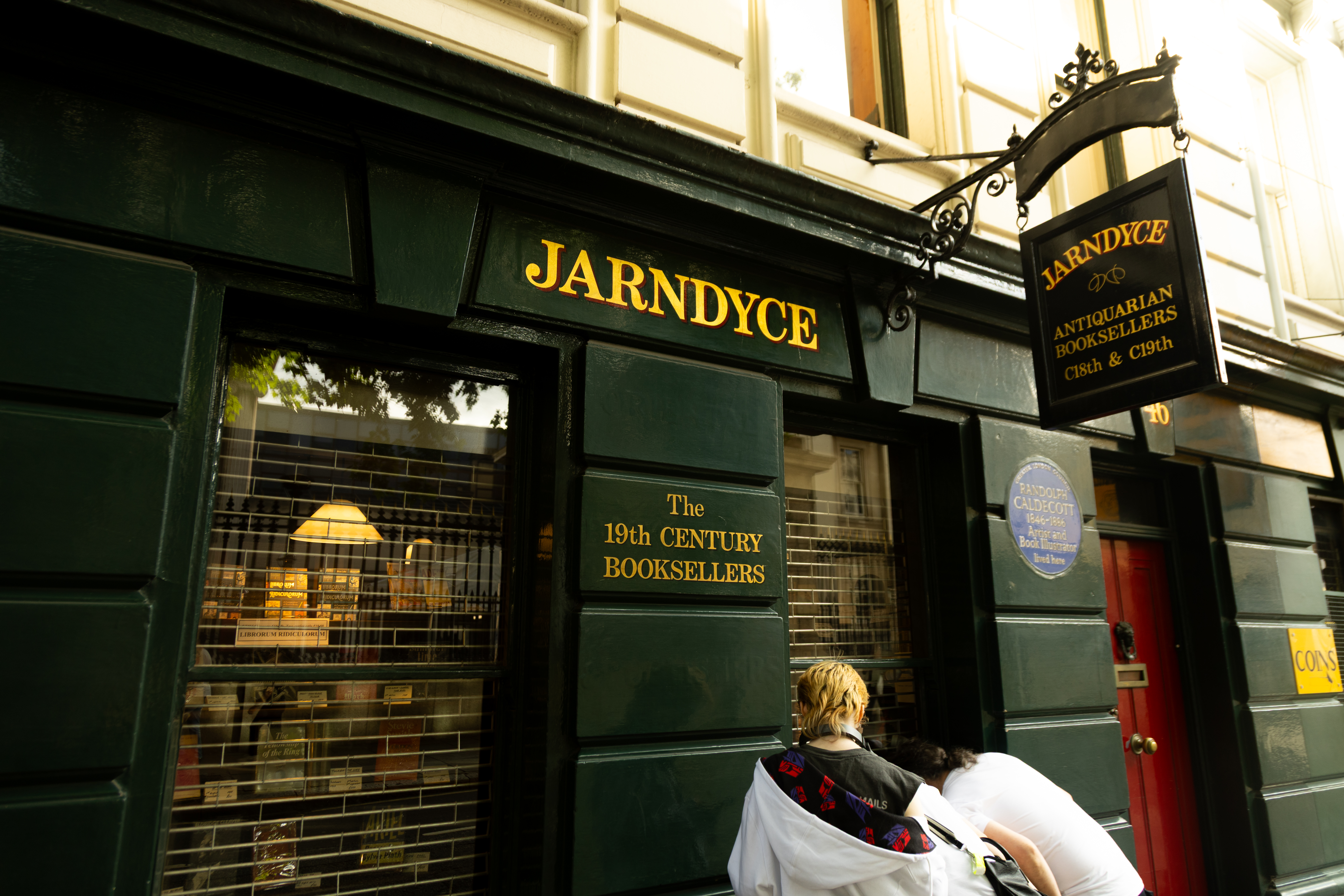
- The storefront in 2025
- Interactive map of Jarndyce Antiquarian Booksellers

General information
- Location: 46 Great Russell Street, London WC1B 3PA, United Kingdom
- Coordinates: 51.518128595763166°N 0.12640508922449437°W

Jarndyce Antiquarian Booksellers is a bookseller and bookstore in London. It is located opposite from the British Museum and sells rare books mostly from the nineteenth century, with an emphasis on Charles Dickens. The Times named it one of the best bookshops in London for rare books, and Londonist called it one of London's most fabulous literary bookshops.

== History ==
In 1969, Brian Lake and Christopher Johnson founded Jarndyce Antiquarian Booksellers; in the seventies, Lake's wife, Janet Nassau, also joined the company.

In 1980, the bookseller paid for its building outright. The building had been built in the 1730s, and Randolph Caldecott had formerly taken residence in it; it still has a small bedroom that staff members occasionally stay in temporarily.

In 2021, Lake and Nassau's son, Edward Nassau Lake, joined as a partner.

== Name ==
The bookseller's name is a reference to the court case Jarndyce and Jarndyce from Bleak House by Dickens.
