= W. B. Maxwell =

British writer (1866–1938)

William Babington Maxwell
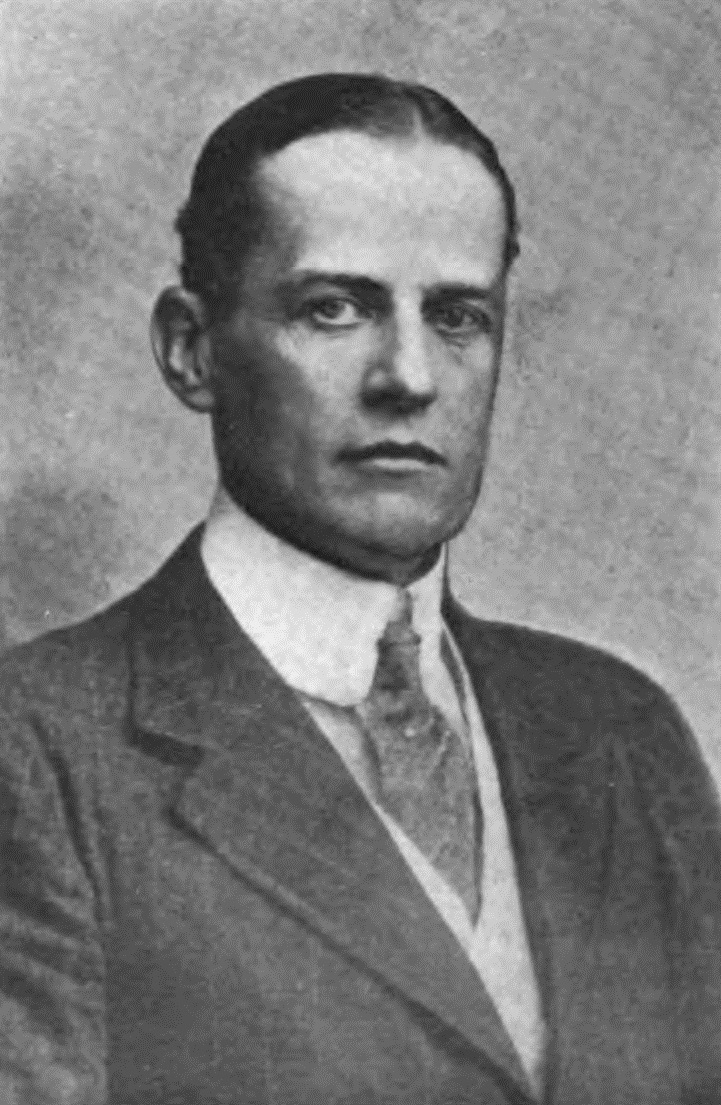
- W.B. Maxwell, The Bookman
- Born: 4 June 1866; Richmond, England
- Died: 4 August 1938 (aged 72)
- Occupations: Novelist and playwright
- Years active: 1880s–1938
- Spouse: Sydney Constance Brabazon (m. 1906–1938)
- Children: Henry Maxwell; Barbara Maxwell
- Relatives: Mary Elizabeth Braddon (mother); John Maxwell (father); Fanny Margaret Maxwell (sister)

William Babington Maxwell (1866–1938) was a British novelist and playwright.

== Early life ==
Born on 4 June 1866, William Babington Maxwell was the son of novelist Mary Elizabeth Braddon and Irish businessman John Maxwell. The family lived at Lichfield House, Richmond, spending holidays in the New Forest. Maxwell's formal education ended at the age of 14 as his mother had a fear of 'over-education'.

== Career ==
Originally training as an artist, Maxwell turned his back on art and began to write short stories to help cope with depression. His first story was published in The World by Edmund Yates for £5. He also wrote stories for Truth and Temple Bar. On his coming of age, his father gave him control of the failing magazine Mistletoe Bough which he tried unsuccessfully to turn around. He wrote The Last Man In, a drama, produced 14 March 1910, at the Royalty Theatre, Glasgow, by the Scottish Repertory Company; and, with George Paston (i.e. Emily Morse Symonds), a farce, The Naked Truth, which was first played at Wyndham's Theatre, London in April 1910, and in which Charles Hawtrey played Bernard Darrell. His 1913 novel The Devil's Garden was banned by the Libraries Association.

He was a friend of Edward VII whom he described as "the biggest swell in Europe".

== First World War ==
Though nearly 50 years old at the outbreak of the First World War, Maxwell was accepted as a lieutenant in the Royal Fusiliers and served in France until 1917. His military career began at a recruitment station in a building under Govett and Sons in Throgmorton Street, London. He was tasked with recruiting 1000 men but was successful in recruiting 1300. From there onwards, the battalion he helped form was sent to Colchester for training. Maxwell was given care of the battalion funds which related to officers, rations and weights. In his notebook dated 1916, he noted a list of rations and weights for soldiers and animals. Maxwell was promoted to Lieutenant on 3 September 1914. From Colchester, Maxwell continued training, moving to Andover and Salisbury Plain before being sent to the front line in 1915. In his autobiography, Time Gathered, under the chapter 'Wasted Years', Maxwell talks about his time as a Regimental Transport Officer, transporting men, equipment, bombs and machine guns to the front line, alongside food and water. He was stationed at Berles-Aux-Bois, a mile from the front line and fought in the Battle of the Somme.

Later, Maxwell was promoted to Honorary Captain for his duties to crown and country. He then moved to Mametz Wood which he nicknames 'Death Valley'. In a routine transportation of equipment, a shell exploded a bomb pile which had previously been dropped off at the front line by Maxwell. Luckily, he reported being uninjured in the blast, without a scratch to his uniform. This was his first brush with death. His second brush with death happened in the trenches with his commanding officer. They hit the floor as the shell hit the trench, and the two men landed down in the dirt. Maxwell discusses in his autobiography how he was sure he had a hole in his back, although yet again escaped unscathed. He was recommended for the military cross by Major General Barnes in October 1917.

In 1917, Maxwell's military career came to an end when he was ordered home by his commander and friend, Reggie Barnes, on the grounds of health; as Barnes was concerned that Maxwell would not survive another winter on the western front. In 1918, Maxwell was officially out of the army.

He served from August 1914 to 1915 in training; shortly after being sent to the western front in 1915–1917 without a break or a return to home.

== Later life ==
Maxwell was the chairman of the Society of Authors until 1928 and later chairman of the National Book Council. He had strong views on modern novelists, believing that they lacked any understanding of the motivations of men and women. He described their portrayal of love-making as having "no more charm and enticement than cattle-farming". Maxwell liked to collect 'detail' on his subjects and was particularly interested in the prevailing conditions of English shop-life and employment of girls in towns.

Maxwell was taken ill at a committee meeting of the Royal Literary Fund and died three week later at his home in Ashley Gardens, Westminster, London on the 4 August 1938.

== Bibliography ==
Maxwell wrote his first novel at the age of 35 and produced 38 novels over the next 37 years.

(Please note: some of the publication dates may not be for the original British edition, but for a later American edition; most, if not all, of Maxwell's works were published on both sides of the Atlantic, some have been translated as well).

All works are in chronological order.

=== Novels ===
- The Countess of Maybury (1901)
- The Ragged Messenger (1904) (filmed in 1917, 1924, and 1930)
- Vivien (1905)
- The Guarded Flame (1906)
- Hill Rise (1907)
- Seymour Charlton (1909)
- The Rest Cure; a novel (1910)
- Honour in Pawn (1911) (filmed in 1916)
- Mrs. Thompson (1911) (filmed in 1919)
- In Cotton Wool (1912)
- The Devil's Garden (1913) (later a 1920 silent film The Devil's Garden)
- General Mallock's Shadow (1913)
- The Mirror and the Lamp (1918)
- A Man and His Lesson (1919)
- Glamour (1919)
- A Remedy Against Sin, a novel (1920)
- For Better, For Worse (1920)
- A Little More (1922) (filmed in 1926 as The Gilded Highway)
- Spinster of This Parish (1922)
- The Day's Journey (1923)
- Elaine at the Gates (1924)
- Fernande (1925)
- Children of the Night (1925)
- Life; a study of self (1925)
- Gabrielle (1926)
- The Case of Bevan Yorke (1927)
- We Forget Because We Must, A Story of Decades and Lustres (1928)
- Himself and Mr. Raikes (1929)
- The Man Who Pretended (1929)
- To what green altar? (1930)
- The concave mirror (1931)
- Amos the Wanderer (1932)
- This Is My Man (1933)
- And Mr. Wyke Bond (1934)
- The People of a House (1934)
- Tudor Green (1935)
- The Emotional Journey (1936)
- Everslade; Men and Women III (1938)

=== Plays ===
- The Last Man In (1910)
- The Naked Truth (1910)

=== Short stories ===
- 'There is a Tide' Belgravia (June 1885)
- 'The Good St. Anthony' Belgravia (Apr 1886)
- 'Poor Mrs. Carrington' Temple Bar (May 1890)
- 'The Pretenders' The Badminton magazine (May 1899)
- 'The Princess – a recollection' The Badminton magazine (Oct 1899)
- Fabulous Fancies (1903)
- Grange and Son Strand magazine (Dec 1906)
- Odd Lengths (1907)
- 'The Cousins' 'Strand Magazine' (1908)
- 'The Devil's Luck' 'Strand Magazine' (1910)
- 'An Impossible Person' 'Strand Magazine' (1912)
- 'The Longest Day of Her Life' 'Strand Magazine' (1913)
- 'The Widow' 'Strand Magazine' (1918)
- 'Joan of Arc' 'Strand Magazine' (1919)
- Life Can Never Be The Same (1919)
- 'Would You Believe It?' 'Strand Magazine' (1921)
- 'Their Last Quarrel' 'Strand Magazine' (1921)
- 'Jacob's Ladder' 'Strand Magazine' (1923)
- 'What Cured Him' 'Strand Magazine' (1923)
- 'The First Man' 'Strand Magazine' (1923)
- 'Suspicion' 'Strand Magazine' (1923)
- '"Mine Eyes Have Seen the Glory"' 'Strand Magazine' (1924)
- 'Can a Mother's Tender Care?' 'Strand Magazine' (1930)
- 'Three Generations' 'Strand Magazine' (1933)
- 'Cleaning the Slate' 'Strand Magazine' (1933)
- 'Joyce and the Unexpected' 'Strand Magazine' (1934)
- 'The Dice-Throwers' 'Strand Magazine' (1936)

=== Other works ===
- Time Gathered: autobiography (1938)
