= William Harrison Ainsworth bibliography =

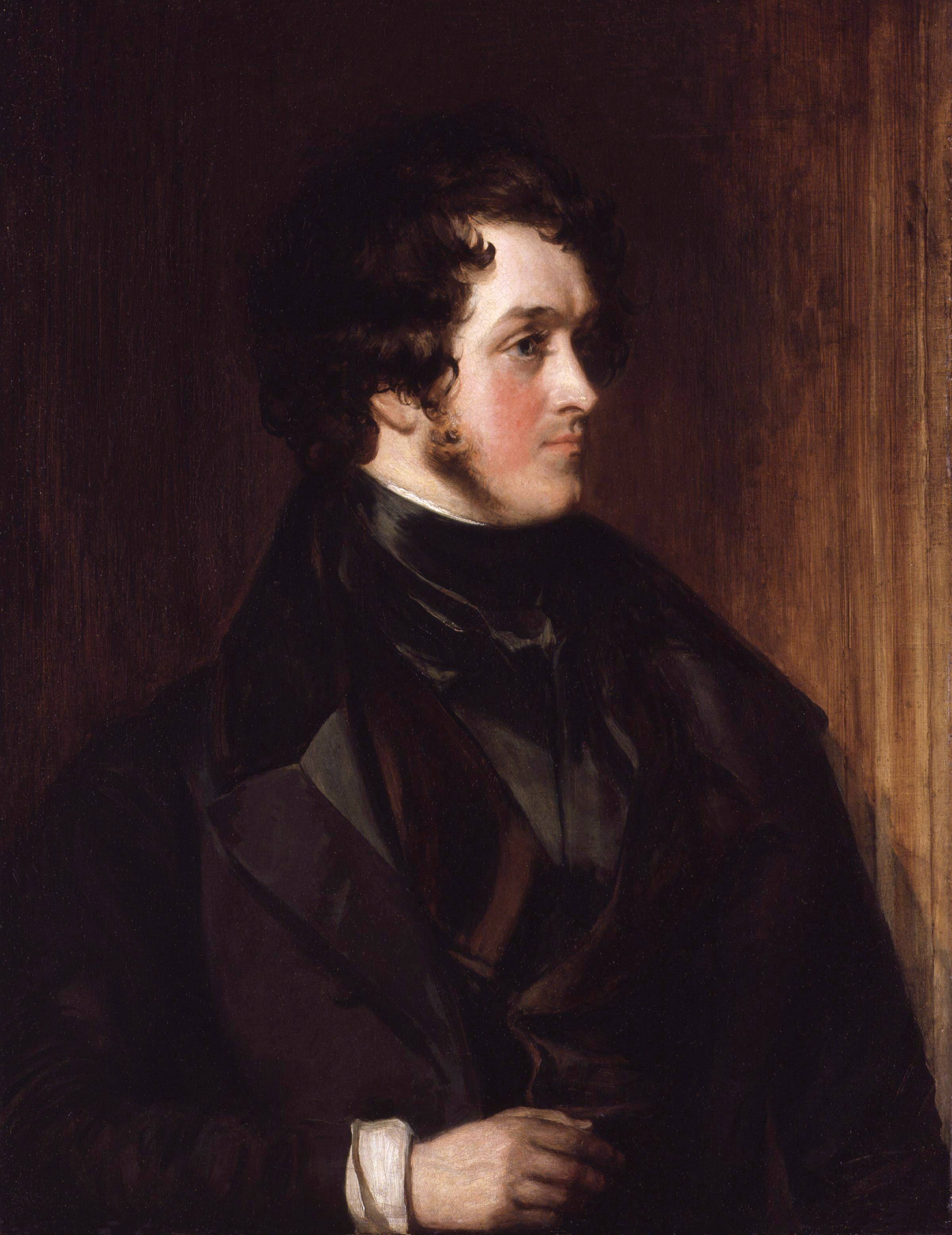
Portrait of William Harrison Ainsworth by Daniel Maclise, 1834

This is a list of works by the English historical novelist William Harrison Ainsworth (1805–1882).

== Novels ==
Title	First publication	Publication Type	Online text
Sir John Chiverton	London: Ebers, 1826	Single volume	
Rookwood	London: Bentley, 1834	Three volumes	Gutenberg
Crichton	London: Bentley, 1837	Three volumes	1898 edition at the Internet Archive
Jack Sheppard	London: Bentley, 1839	Three volumes	Gutenberg
The Tower of London	London: Bentley, 1840	Two volumes	
Guy Fawkes	London: Bentley, 1841	Three volumes	Gutenberg
Old Saint Paul's	London: Cunningham, 1841	Three volumes	Gutenberg
The Miser's Daughter	London: Cunningham, 1842	Three volumes	
Windsor Castle	London: Colburn, 1842	Three Volumes	Gutenberg
St James's	London: John Mortimer, 1844	Three volumes	1865 edition at the Internet Archive
James the Second	London: Colburn, 1848	Three volumes	1865 edition at the Internet Archive
The Lancashire Witches	London: Colburn, 1849	Three Volumes	Gutenberg
Auriol	London: Chapman & Hall, 1850	Single volume	1865 edition at the Internet Archive
The Flitch of Bacon	London: Routledge, 1854	Single volume	
The Star-Chamber	London: Routledge, 1854	Two volumes	Volume 1 ,Gutenberg; Volume 2 ,Gutenberg
The Spendthrift	London: Routledge, 1857. Set in the 18th century	Single volume	
The Life and Adventures of Mervyn Clitheroe	London: Routledge, 1858	Single volume	
Ovingdean Grange	London: Routledge, 1860	Single volume	
The Constable of the Tower	London: Chapman & Hall, 1861	Three volumes	1880 edition at the Internet Archive
The Lord Mayor of London	London: Chapman & Hall, 1862. Set in the reign of George III of the United Kingdom	Three volumes	1880 edition at the Internet Archive
Cardinal Pole	London: Chapman & Hall, 1863	Three volumes	1865 edition at the Internet Archive; 1876 edition at the Internet Archive
John Law	London: Chapman & Hall, 1864	Three volumes	1867 edition at the Internet Archive
The Spanish Match	London: Chapman & Hall, 1865	Three volumes	1883 edition at the Internet Archive
The Constable de Bourbon	London: Chapman & Hall, 1866	Three volumes	1878 edition at the Internet Archive
Old Court	London: Chapman & Hall, 1867	Three Volumes	
Myddleton Pomfret	London: Chapman & Hall, 1868	Three Volumes	1878 edition at the Internet Archive
Hilary St. Ives	London: Chapman & Hall, 1870	Three Volumes	
Talbot Harland	London: John Dicks, 1870	Single volume	
The South-Sea Bubble	London: John Dicks, 1871	Single volume	
Tower Hill	London: John Dicks, 1871	Single volume	
Boscobel	London: Tinsley, 1872	Three Volumes	Gutenberg; 1875 edition at the Internet Archive
The Good Old Times	London: Tinsley, 1873	Three Volumes (reissued as The Manchester Rebels London: Tinsley, 1874)	
Merry England: or, Nobles and Serfs	London: Tinsley, 1874	Three volumes	
The Goldsmith's Wife	London: Tinsley, 1875	Three volumes	
Preston Fight: or, The Insurrection of 1715	London: Tinsley, 1875	Three Volumes	1877 edition at the Internet Archive
Chetwynd Calverley	London: Tinsley, 1876	Three volumes	1877 edition at the Internet Archive
The Leaguer of Lathom	London: Tinsley, 1876	Three volumes	1878 edition at the Internet Archive
The Fall of Somerset	London: Tinsley, 1877	Three volumes	
Beatrice Tyldesley	London: Tinsley, 1878, set in the reign of James II of England	Three volumes	
Beau Nash	London: Routledge, 1879	Three volumes	
Stanley Brereton	London: Routledge, 1881	Three volumes	
Sources: A Dictionary of Writers and their Works; Sadleir's XIX Century Fiction

== Other works ==
- December Tales. London: G. & W. B. Whittaker, 1823
- The Combat of the Thirty: From a Breton lay of the fourteenth century; with an introduction, comprising a new chapter of Froissart. London: Chapman & Hall, 1859
