= Boscobel (novel) =

1872 novel

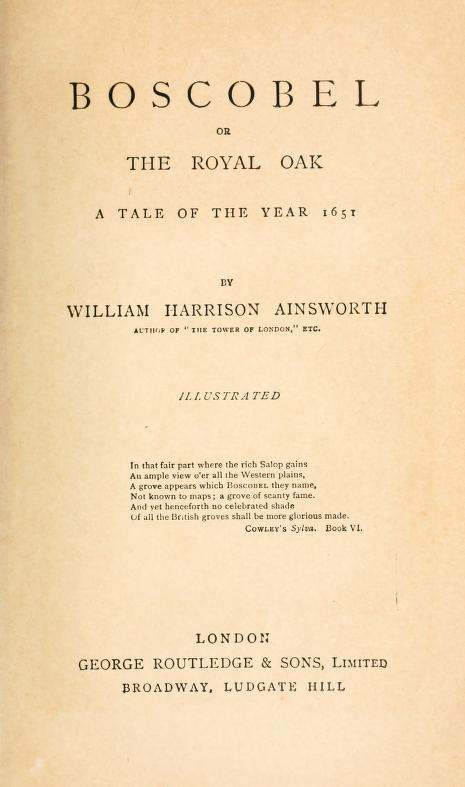
- Author: William Harrison Ainsworth
- Language: English
- Genre: Historical
- Publisher: Tinsley Brothers
- Publication date: 1872
- Publication place: United Kingdom
- Media type: Print

Boscobel is an 1872 historical novel by the British writer William Harrison Ainsworth. It first appeared as a serial in The New Monthly Magazine before being published in three volumes by the London publishing house Tinsley Brothers. It marked a return to the historical subjects he was best known for, after producing three novels with contemporary settings such as Old Court (1867) and Myddleton Pomfret (1868). It takes place in the weeks before and following the Battle of Worcester in 1651, in which Charles II avoided capture after his defeat by his republican enemies under Oliver Cromwell. His escape included hiding in the royal oak at Boscobel House in Shropshire, from which the novel takes its title. It also formed the first of a trio of "Jacobite" novels sympathetic to the Stuart Dynasty, followed by The Manchester Rebels (1873) and Preston Fight (1875).

== Bibliography ==
- Carver, Stephen James. The Life and Works of the Lancashire Novelist William Harrison Ainsworth, 1850-1882. Edwin Mellen Press, 2003.
- Ellis, Stewart Marsh. William Harrison Ainsworth and His Friends, Volume 2. Garland Publishing, 1979.
- Slater, John Herbert. Early Editions: A Bibliographical Survey of the Works of Some Popular Modern Authors. K. Paul, Trench, Trubner, & Company, 1894.
