= 1868 in literature =

Events from the year 1868 in literature .

== Events ==
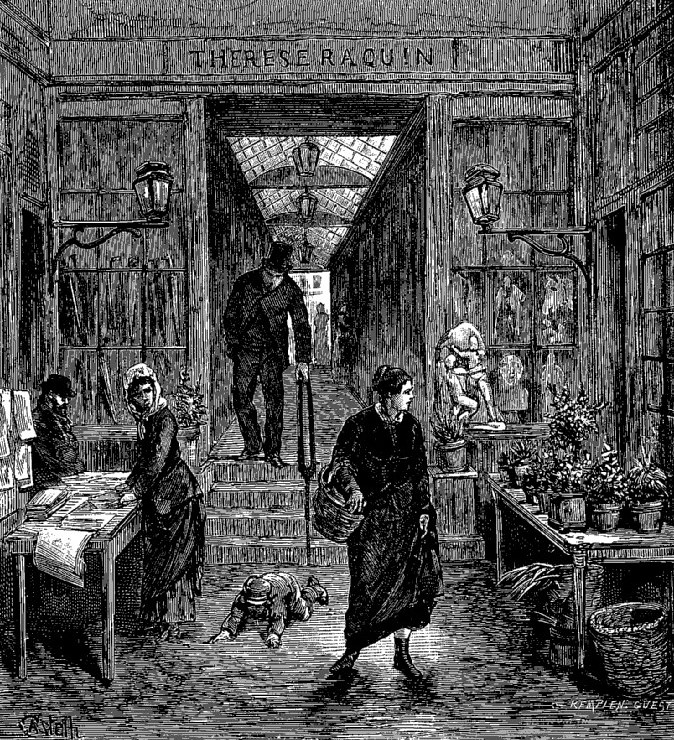
The Passage du Pont-Neuf in Thérèse Raquin (illustration by Horace Castelli, 1883)

- January – Émile Zola defends his first major novel, Thérèse Raquin (1867), against charges of pornography and corruption of morals.
- January 4–August 8 – Wilkie Collins' epistolary novel The Moonstone: a Romance is serialised in All the Year Round (U.K.), being published in book format in July by Tinsley Brothers of London. It is seen as a precursor of full-length mystery fiction (with its introduction of the police detective Sergeant Cuff) and the psychological thriller.
- January 9 – John William De Forest, writing for The Nation, calls for a more specifically American literature; the essay's title, "The Great American Novel", is the first known use of the term.
- April 29 – The Court of King's Bench (England) decides on appeal the legal case Regina v. Hicklin on interpretation of the word "obscene" in the Obscene Publications Act 1857, applying the "Hicklin test": that any part of a publication with a "tendency... to deprave and corrupt those whose minds are open to such immoral influences, and into whose hands a publication of this sort may fall" makes the whole publication obscene, regardless of the author's intentions.
- September – The first volume of Louisa May Alcott's novel for girls Little Women is published by Roberts Brothers of Boston, Massachusetts.
- November
  - Robert Browning's narrative poem The Ring and the Book begins four-part publication by Smith, Elder & Co. in London. It is a major commercial and critical success.
  - Norman MacLeod, editor of Good Words (U.K.), begins publishing its companion juvenile version, Good Words for the Young. The first issue begins the serial publication of George MacDonald's At the Back of the North Wind.
- November 15–24 – United Kingdom general election, the first under the extended franchise of the Reform Act 1867. English novelist Anthony Trollope runs as a Liberal candidate for Beverley. He finishes last, and the seat is held by the Conservatives although the general election returns the Liberal Party to a parliamentary majority. The Beverley election is subsequently set aside and the seat voided because of bribery, touching on some of the central issues of his political novel Phineas Finn which is being serialized at this time. The fictional Percycross election in Trollope's Ralph the Heir (1871) and the Tankerville election in Phineas Redux (1874) are closely based on the Beverley campaign.
- December – The Globe Theatre (Newcastle Street) in London opens with the premiere of the recently bankrupted Henry James Byron's semi-autobiographical comedy Cyril's Success.
- unknown dates
  - The first edition of The World Almanac and Book of Facts is published by the New York World.
  - The first substantial translation into English from Dream of the Red Chamber is made by Edward Charles Bowra.
  - Tauchnitz publishers of Leipzig begin their Collection of German Authors, a series of cheap, authorized paperback reprints.

== New books ==
=== Fiction ===
- William Harrison Ainsworth – Myddleton Pomfret
- R. M. Ballantyne – Deep Down
- Henry Ward Beecher – Norwood, or Village Life in New England
- Mary Elizabeth Braddon – Dead-Sea Fruit
- Mary Elizabeth Braddon – Run to Earth
- Mortimer Collins – Sweet Anne Page
- Wilkie Collins – The Moonstone
- Alphonse Daudet – Le Petit Chose
- Comte de Lautréamont (anonymously as "***") – Les Chants de Maldoror, Chant premier
- Fyodor Dostoevsky – The Idiot («Идио́т»)
- Émile Gaboriau – Slaves of Paris (Les Esclaves de Paris)
- Hermann Goedsche – Biarritz
- Bret Harte – The Luck of Roaring Camp
- Sheridan Le Fanu – Haunted Lives
- George MacDonald – Robert Falconer
- Caroline Norton – Old Sir Douglas
- Anthony Trollope – Linda Tressel
- Elizabeth Stuart Phelps Ward – The Gates Ajar
- Émile Zola – Madeleine Ferat, "Therese Raquin"

=== Children and young people ===
- Louisa May Alcott – Little Women (Vol. 1; Vol. 2 in 1869)
- Horatio Alger Jr.
  - Fame and Fortune
  - Ragged Dick (book publication)
  - Struggling Upward
- Rosa Nouchette Carey – Nellie's Memories
- James Greenwood – The Purgatory of Peter the Cruel
- Hesba Stretton – Little Meg's Children
- Jules Verne – In Search of the Castaways (Les Enfants du capitaine Grant)

=== Drama ===
- Samson Bodnărescu – Rienzi
- Henry James Byron – Cyril's Success
- Aleksandr Ostrovsky – Enough Stupidity in Every Wise Man (Na vsyakogo mudretsa dovolno prostoty)
- Hendrik Jan Schimmel – Struensee
- Aleksey Konstantinovich Tolstoy – Tsar Fyodor Ioannovich

=== Poetry ===
- William Morris – The Earthly Paradise Volume 1

=== Non-fiction ===
- Elizabeth Keckley – Behind the Scenes: Thirty Years a Slave and Four Years in the White House
- Eliza Lynn Linton – The Girl of the Period
- Edward A. Pollard – The Lost Cause Regained
- John Wisden – Cricket and How to Play it
- World Almanac (first edition)

== Births ==
- January 1 – Sophia Alice Callahan, American Muscogee novelist and teacher (died 1894)
- January 5 – Edward Garnett, English writer, critic and literary editor (died 1937)
- February 4 – Miyake Kaho (三宅花圃), Japanese novelist, essayist and poet (died 1943)
- February 10 – William Allen White, American journalist (died 1944)
- February 23 – W. E. B. Du Bois, American sociologist, historian and Pan-Africanist (died 1963)
- March 28 – Maxim Gorky, Russian novelist and dramatist (died 1936)
- April 1 – Edmond Rostand, French poet and novelist (died 1918)
- May 6 – Gaston Leroux, French journalist and novelist (died 1927)
- May 7 – Stanisław Przybyszewski, Polish novelist, dramatist and poet (died 1927)
- July 10 – Afevork Ghevre Jesus, Ethiopian novelist and linguist (died 1947)
- July 14 – Gertrude Bell, English archaeologist, writer, spy and administrator (died 1926)
- July 17 – Henri Nathansen, Danish writer and stage director (died 1944)
- August 1 - Hjalmar Bergström, Danish playwright, novelist, and short story writer (died 1914)
- August 6 – Paul Claudel, French poet, dramatist and diplomat (died 1955)
- August 23 – Edgar Lee Masters, American poet, biographer, dramatist and lawyer (died 1950)
- September 9 – Mary Hunter Austin, American writer of fiction and non-fiction (died 1934)
- September 14 – Théodore Botrel, French poet and dramatist (died 1925)
- October 18 – Ernst Didring, Swedish novelist (died 1931)
- November 5 – Kassian Bogatyrets, Rusyn priest, politician and historian (died 1960)
- November 14 – Steele Rudd, Australian author (died 1935)
- November 30 – Angela Brazil, English writer of schoolgirl fiction (died 1947)
- c. December 12 – Stephen Hudson (born Sydney Schiff), English novelist, translator and arts patron (died 1944)
- December 14 – Louise Hammond Willis Snead, American writer, artist and composer (died 1958)
- December 19 – Eleanor H. Porter, American novelist (died 1920)
- December 25 – Ahmed Shawqi, Egyptian poet (died 1932)
- December 28 – Bucura Dumbravă, Romanian novelist and spiritualist (died 1926)

== Deaths ==
- January 6 – Scarlat Vârnav, Romanian journalist, educationist and librarian (digestive illness, year of birth unknown)
- January 24 – John David Macbride, English Arabist and academic (born 1778)
- March 8 – Jón Thoroddsen elder, Icelandic poet and novelist (born 1818 or 1819)
- June 6 – Daniel Pierce Thompson, American novelist and lawyer (born 1795)
- June 15 – Robert Vaughan, English historian and religious writer (born 1795)
- June 18 – Charles Harpur, Australian poet (tuberculosis, born 1813)
- July 6 – Samuel Lover, Irish writer and composer (born 1797)
- July 30 – Mihály Tompa, Hungarian lyric poet (born 1819)
- August 24 – Constantin Negruzzi (Costache Negruzzi), Romanian poet, novelist and playwright (born 1808)
- August 25 – Jacob van Lennep, Dutch poet and novelist (born 1802)
- September 24 – Henry Hart Milman, English historian (born 1791)
- November 30 – August Blanche, Swedish journalist, novelist and statesman (heart attack; born 1811)

== Awards ==
- Newdigate Prize – John Alexander Stewart
