= Hilary St. Ives =

1870 novel

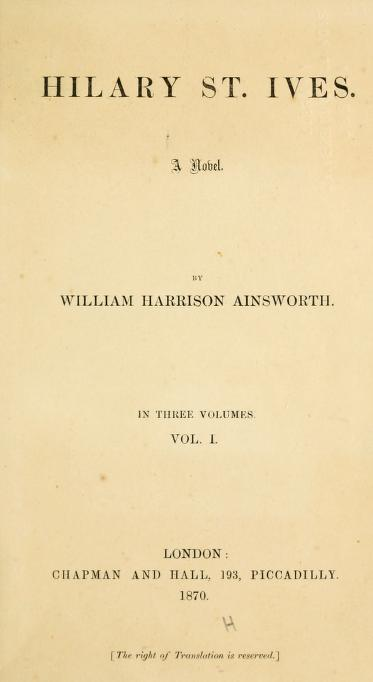
- Author: William Harrison Ainsworth
- Language: English
- Genre: Drama
- Publisher: Chapman and Hall
- Publication date: 1870
- Publication place: United Kingdom
- Media type: Print

Hilary St. Ives is an 1870 novel in three volumes by the British writer William Harrison Ainsworth. Originally serialised in The New Monthly Magazine during 1869, it was then published in London by Chapman and Hall. Although Ainsworth was best known for his historical novels, this was one of three novels in a row with contemporary settings along with Old Court (1867) and Myddleton Pomfret (1868). Stylistically it borrows from the sensation novels popular at the time. He then returned to his more usual historical settings with Boscobel (1872) which takes place in the mid-seventeenth century.

== Bibliography ==
- Carver, Stephen James. The Life and Works of the Lancashire Novelist William Harrison Ainsworth, 1850-1882. Edwin Mellen Press, 2003.
- Slater, John Herbert. Early Editions: A Bibliographical Survey of the Works of Some Popular Modern Authors. K. Paul, Trench, Trubner, & Company, 1894.
- Sutherland, Joan. The Stanford Companion to Victorian Fiction. Santford University Press, 1989.
