= Beatrice Tyldesley =

1878 novel

- Author: William Harrison Ainsworth
- Language: English
- Genre: Historical
- Publisher: William Tinsley
- Publication date: 1878
- Publication place: United Kingdom
- Media type: Print

Beatrice Tyldesley is an 1878 historical novel by the British writer William Harrison Ainsworth, originally published in three volumes by William Tinsley having been serialised in the magazine Bow Bells. It revolves around the aftermath of the Glorious Revolution of 1688 and the Manchester Trials of suspected Jacobites in 1694. Plots featuring Jacobites became a major feature of Ainsworth's writing in his later years.

== Synopsis ==
Following his loss in the war in Ireland, James II has withdrawn into exile at Saint-Germain outside Paris. His loyal supporters including Walter Crosby and Beatrice Tyldesley, a lady-in-waiting to Mary of Modena, plan to restore him to the throne through an uprising in the North of England.

== Bibliography ==
- Carver, Stephen James. The Life and Works of the Lancashire Novelist William Harrison Ainsworth, 1850-1882. Edwin Mellen Press, 2003.
- Newbolt, Peter. William Tinsley (1831-1902): Speculative Publisher. Taylor & Francis, 2019.
- Poole, Robert (ed.) The Lancashire Witches: Histories and Stories. Manchester University Press, 2013.
- Worth, George John. William Harrison Ainsworth. Twayne Publishers, 1972.
