= Spanish match =

Proposed marriage between the future Charles I of England and Infanta Maria Anna

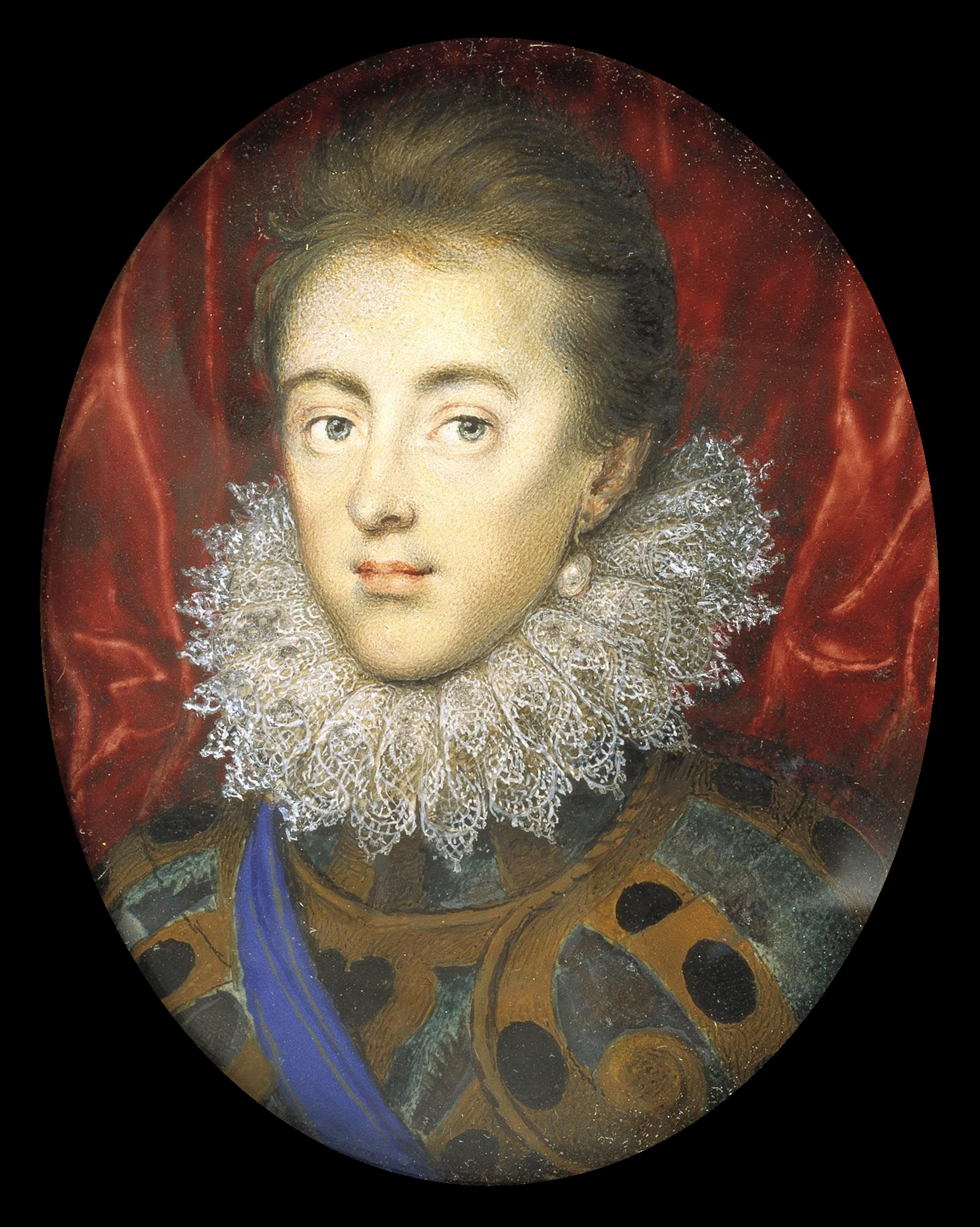
Charles, Prince of Wales (1615 portrait by Isaac Oliver)

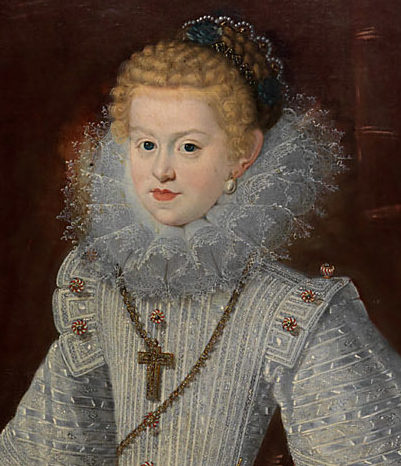
The Infanta Maria Anna (1617 portrait by Bartolomé González y Serrano)

The Spanish match was a proposed marriage between Prince Charles (b. 1600), the only surviving son of James VI and I, King of Scotland, Ireland and England; and the Infanta Maria Anna (b. 1606), daughter of Philip III, King of Spain and Portugal. Negotiations took place over the period 1614 to 1623, and during this time became closely related to aspects of British foreign and religious policy, before breaking down completely.

The policy, unpopular with England's Protestant House of Commons, where the recent Anglo-Spanish War (1585–1604) had not been forgotten, was initiated during the embassy to England of Diego Sarmiento de Acuña, conde de Gondomar, who arrived in London in 1614 with the offer that Spain would not interfere with James's troubled rule in Ireland if James would restrain the English "privateers" in Spanish American waters. Further, he proposed a marriage alliance, offering a dowry of £500,000 (later increased to £600,000), which seemed especially attractive to James after the failure of the Parliament of 1614 to provide him with the financial subsidies he requested.

The climax of the ensuing decade of high-level negotiation to secure a marriage between the leading Protestant and Catholic royal families of Europe occurred in 1623 in Madrid, with the embassy of the Prince Charles and James's favourite, George Villiers, 1st Duke of Buckingham. The wedding never took place despite the signing of a marriage contract by King James; criticism instead led to the dissolution of Parliament.

== Background ==
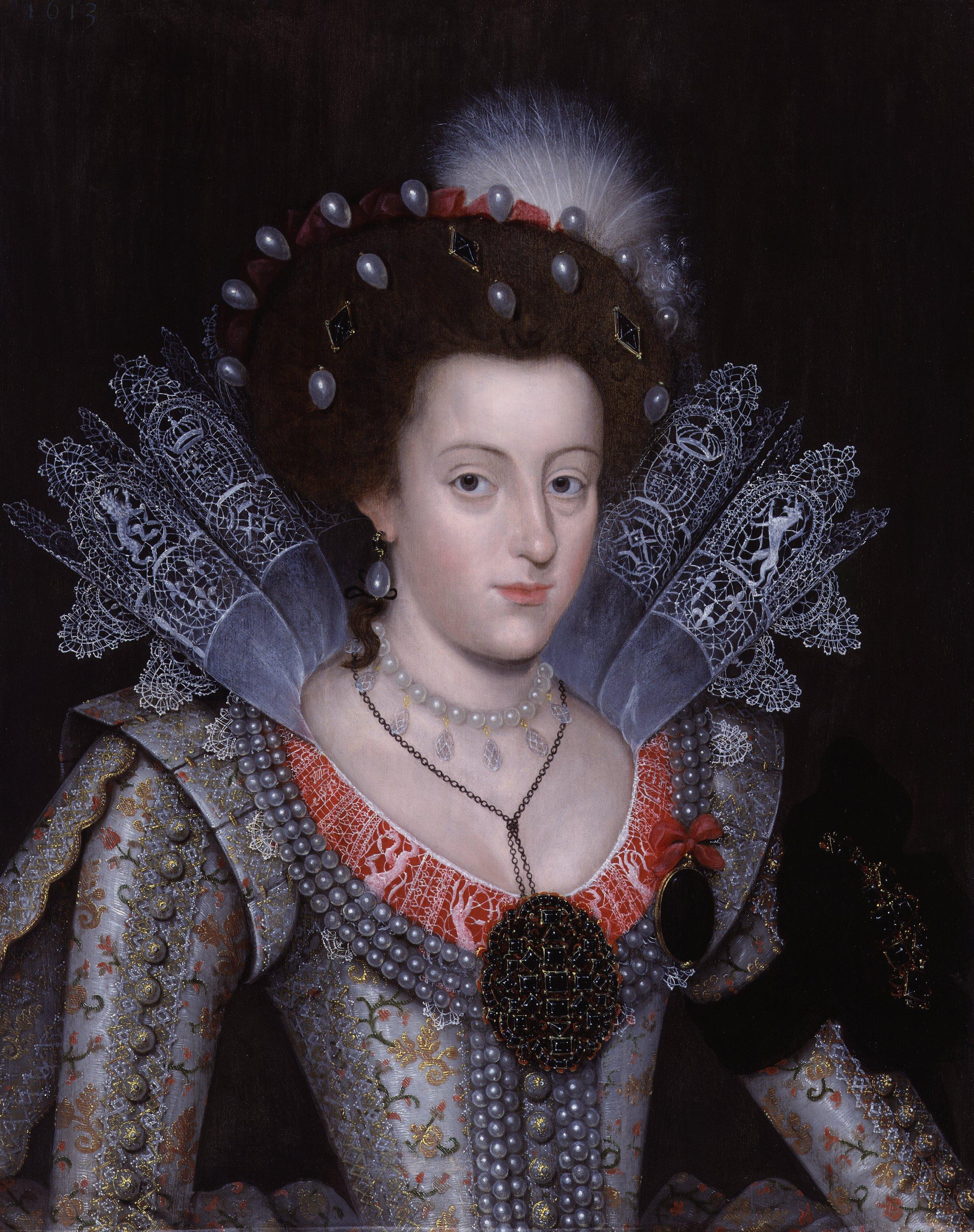
Portrait of Princess Elizabeth Stuart, later Queen of Bohemia, called the Winter Queen. The black armband is thought to be a sign of mourning for her brother Henry Frederick.

A Spanish marriage for Henry Frederick, Prince of Wales, Charles's elder brother who had died in 1612, had been proposed by his mother Anne of Denmark. After his death she supported the idea of a Spanish marriage for her daughter Elizabeth, but in 1613 Elizabeth married a prominent Protestant German prince. For her second son Charles, there were candidate marriages mooted from Savoy and Tuscany, as well as Spain and France. From 1614 to her own death in 1619, Queen Anne gave some support to a Spanish match, preferring at times a French marriage, and recognising that the Spanish proposals were entirely based on self-interest. A point brought up against it in 1620 was that the previous "Spanish matches", those that had brought Catherine of Aragon to England, and Philip II of Spain to marry Mary I, had in the popular memory turned out badly.

== James I's policy ==
At the beginning of 1618 James I and VI was in a strong diplomatic position. His efforts against wars in Europe had been largely effective, and his own status as a Protestant ruler who was on good terms with Catholic powers was high. Success in reducing the religious factor in international relations then deteriorated for James, in parallel with the failure of the Spanish match, with the onset of the Thirty Years' War. In 1618 he was still concerned with detailed moves to improve his relationship with Spain, such as the translation of the anti-Calvinist Bishop Lancelot Andrewes, and the execution of the buccaneering Sir Walter Raleigh.

On the domestic front, the prospect of a Spanish dowry from a marriage between his heir Charles, Prince of Wales from 1616, and Infanta Maria Anna of Spain, was a potential source of income for James, who sought ways to rule without depending on the Commons for subsidies. The policy of the Spanish match was supported by the Howards and other Catholic-leaning ministers and diplomats—together known as the "Spanish Party"—but deeply distrusted by some Protestant groups in England. Sentiment was voiced vociferously in the Commons when James called his first parliament for seven years in 1621 to raise funds for a military expedition in support of Frederick V, Elector Palatine, his son-in-law.

There was in fact no chance that Pope Paul V would have issued the required dispensation for the Infanta to marry a Protestant. This fact was known to the Spanish king, but apparently Gondomar was kept in ignorance of the correspondence. Paul V died early in 1621, and his successor Pope Gregory XV was thought amenable to the idea of the match. James sent George Gage to Rome to lobby, putting the case on behalf of English Catholics. The matter was passed to a small group of cardinals, who emphasised that improved treatment for English Catholics was a prerequisite.

== Political opposition ==
By the 1620s, events on the continent had stirred up anti-Catholic feeling to a new pitch. A conflict had broken out between the Catholic Holy Roman Empire and the Protestant Electoral Palatinate, when the Bohemians deposed Ferdinand II, Holy Roman Emperor as their king and elected James's son-in-law, Frederick V, Elector Palatine, in his place, triggering the Thirty Years' War. James reluctantly summoned parliament as the only means to raise the funds necessary to assist his daughter Elizabeth and Frederick, who had been ousted from Prague by Emperor Ferdinand in 1620. The Commons on the one hand granted subsidies inadequate to finance serious military operations in aid of Frederick, and on the other called for a war directly against Spain.

In November 1621, led by Sir Edward Coke, the Commons framed a petition asking not only for a war with Spain but for Prince Charles to marry a Protestant, and for enforcement of the anti-Catholic laws. When James heard of the petition, he is said to have cried, "God give me patience". James flatly told them not to interfere in matters of royal prerogative or they would risk punishment; to which provocation they reacted by issuing a statement protesting their rights, including freedom of speech. James wrote: "We cannot with patience endure our subjects to use such anti-monarchical words to us concerning their liberties, except they had subjoined that they were granted unto them by the grace and favour of our predecessors." Urged on by Buckingham and the Spanish ambassador Gondomar, James ripped the protest out of the record book and dissolved Parliament.

== Opposition literature, censorship and imprisonment ==
Outside the political process, feelings that were both anti-Spanish and anti-Catholic ran high. Pamphleteering attacks aimed at the Spanish match through the court, deploying "defamation, forgery and partisan distortion". Smears in the form of fabricated personal details about figures associated with the Spanish Party were published, especially by the Puritan faction. Thomas Scott is particularly noted for his part in this campaign, from 1619.

In 1620, and again in 1621, James issued decrees against writing or speaking on state affairs. John Everard preached against the match in February 1621, at St Martin-in-the-Fields, and spent about half a year in the Gatehouse Prison. When Robert Mason wrote in 1622 to his friend Thomas Hobbes about public opinion on the match, criticising James's policy and noting Gondomar's skill in gaining support for it by holding out the prospect of the Palatinate being returned to Frederick V, he hedged his comments with pleas for secrecy.

Thomas Middleton's 1624 play A Game at Chess allegorized the events surrounding the Spanish match. It was particularly harsh on Gondomar, represented by the Black Knight. Plays were in any case censored, and Henry Herbert as Master of the Revels passed it for performance; it was a short-lived succès de scandale in August 1624. It has been suggested that Herbert connived at the unheard-of dramatic liberties taken in portraying members of the royal family, in a court now dominated by the anti-Spanish party. Plays of the previous two years that had Spanish settings, Thomas Middleton and William Rowley's The Changeling and Thomas Dekker's Match Me in London, have been given readings that set them against the match, necessarily more covertly.

== Charles in Spain ==
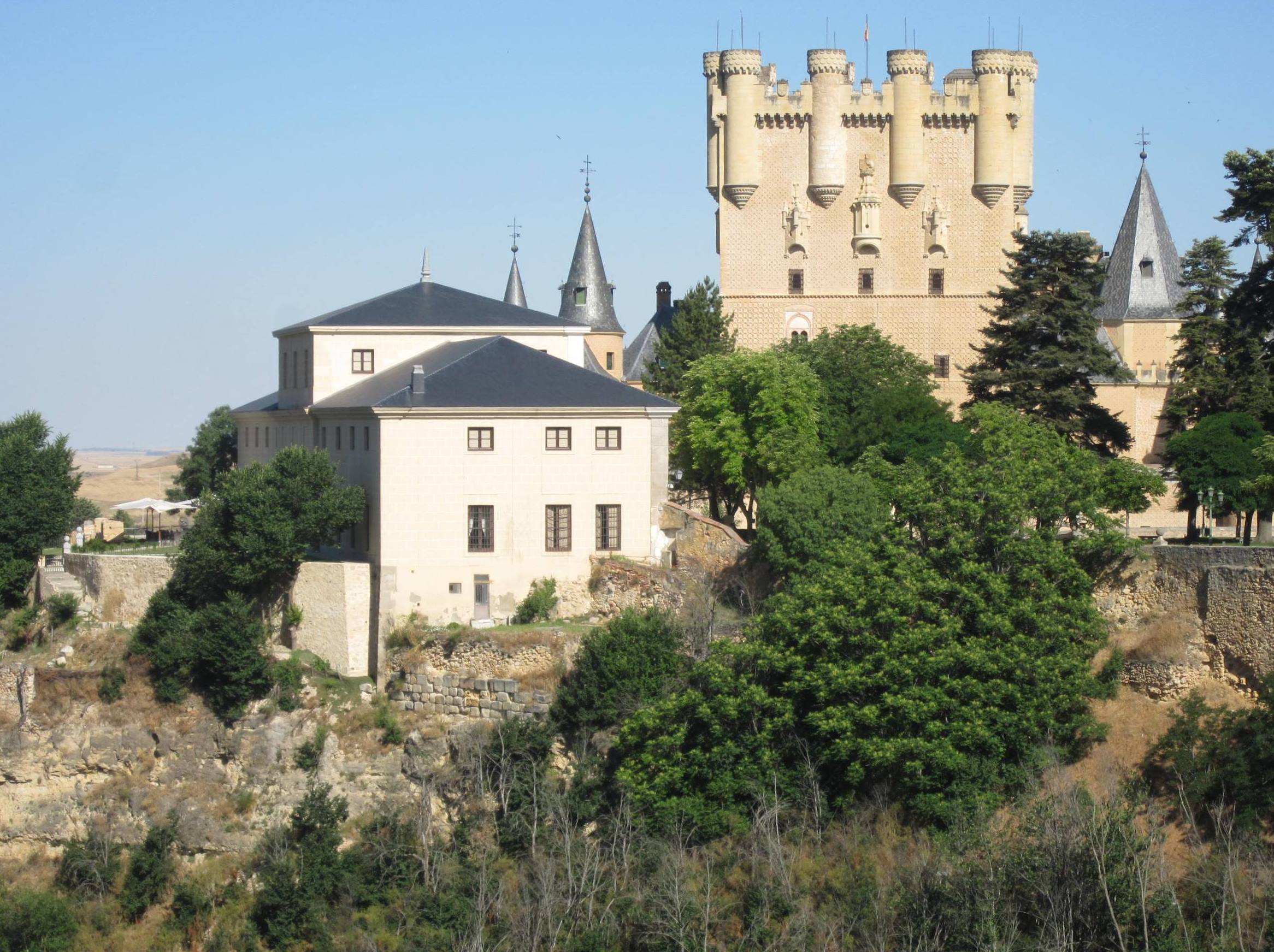
Prince Charles was entertained at the Alcázar of Segovia on his journey from Madrid to Santander.

Denied the military option, James ignored public opinion and returned to the Spanish match as his only hope of restoring the possessions of Elizabeth and Frederick. The position was altered, however, by the death of Philip III of Spain, in 1621. With the accession of Philip IV of Spain the Spanish proponent of the marriage, Gondomar, lost influence to Gaspar de Guzmán, Count-Duke of Olivares.

When negotiations began to drag, Prince Charles, now 22, and Buckingham decided to seize the initiative and travel to Castile incognito, to win the Infanta directly. Travelling under the names Thomas and John Smith, they arrived at the residence of the English ambassador in Madrid, the "House of the Seven Chimneys" on the Plaza de Rey, on 7 March 1623 (OS). The ambassador, John Digby, 1st Earl of Bristol, had been given no warning of the Prince's intentions, and Philip IV was astonished. Charles and Buckingham were ignorant of the key facts, that Maria Anna was strongly averse to marrying a non-Catholic, and that the Spanish, who had been protracting the marriage negotiations to keep English troops out of the war, would never agree to such a match unless James and Charles pledged to repeal the anti-Catholic Penal Laws.

They were welcomed at the Royal Alcázar of Madrid. The reception at court and the journey was described by the author Andrés de Almansa y Mendoza. Richard Wynn, a Gentleman of the Bedchamber, sailed with other members of the royal household in the Adventure from Portsmouth to join the Prince. Wynn's account of the journey describes the costumes of Spanish country people and aristocrats, and the difficulties and uncertainties of the journey.

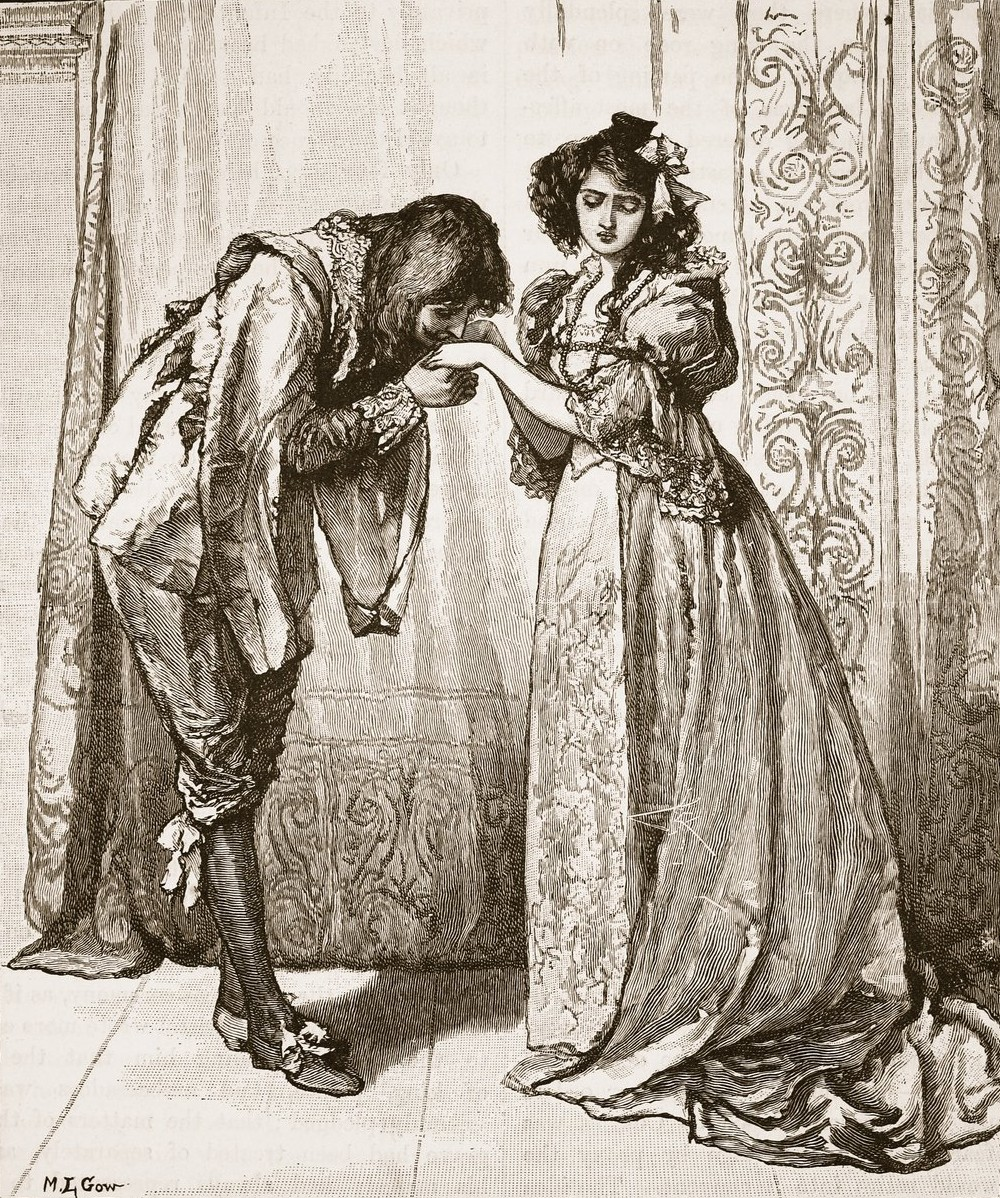
Prince Charles bids farewell to the Infanta (Mary Gow, c. 1909)

During the visit, Spanish national poet Pedro Calderón de la Barca made his debut as a playwright with Amor, honor y poder ("Love, honor, and power"), a verse drama about the life of King Edward III of England, which was performed before the Prince at the Royal Alcázar of Madrid on 29 June 1623.

Francis Stuart sailed to Castile in the St George bringing the patent creating the titles Duke of Buckingham and Earl of Coventry. He also brought a parcel of jewels for Prince Charles, many of which had belonged to Anne of Denmark. These included; the jewelled sword given to Henry Frederick, Prince of Wales during the masque Tethys' Festival; the "Portugal diamond"; the "Cobham pearl"; jewelled head attires; and a ring with a diamond frog and a ruby set in its head.

Though a secret treaty was signed, the Prince and Duke returned to England in October without the Infanta. On their way to Santander they visited El Escorial, the Palace of Valsain, the Alcázar of Segovia, Valladolid, Palencia, and Frómista. There was open delight shown by sections of the British people.

== The Privy Council ==
From 1617 the negotiations for the match had been handled by the Privy Council. In fact it was considered that there was a need for confidential dealings with Spanish counterparts, and a subcommittee of the council was set up for that reason; which later became a vehicle for discussion of foreign policy more generally, and persisted into the next reign. The last word on the Spanish Match was the vote in the Privy Council to reject the Spanish terms, taking place in January 1624.

== Aftermath ==
Affronted by their treatment in Spain, Charles and Buckingham now turned James's Spanish policy on its head: they called for a French match and a war against the Habsburg Spanish Empire. To raise the necessary finance, they prevailed upon James to call another Parliament, which met in February 1624. For once, the outpouring of anti-Catholic sentiment in the Commons was echoed in court, where control of policy had shifted from James to Charles and Buckingham, who pressured the King to declare war and engineered the impeachment and imprisonment of the Lord Treasurer, Lionel Cranfield, 1st Earl of Middlesex, when he opposed the idea on grounds of cost.

Lord Bristol, though entirely blameless, was made the scapegoat for the failure of the match: he was recalled in disgrace, ordered to remain on his estates and later imprisoned for a time in the Tower of London. Charles thus antagonised one of his most gifted and trustworthy public servants, and they were not fully reconciled until the outbreak of the English Civil War.

The outcome of the Parliament of 1624 was ambiguous: James still refused to declare war, but Charles believed the Commons had committed themselves to financing a war against Spain, a stance which was to contribute to his problems with Parliament in his own reign. Charles eventually married Henrietta Maria of France.

== Gifts of jewels ==
Charles was supplied with various jewels from the English royal collection to give as gifts. King James sent advice on this gift giving to his son in Spain. When Charles gave his farewells to the Spanish court, his presents included; to the King, a sword set with diamonds; to the Queen, two large diamonds, and a pair of earrings including diamonds as big as a bean; to the Infanta, a string of 250 pear shaped pearls; to Don Carlos, a pointed diamond; to the Cardinal, a pectoral of topazes, diamonds, and pearls; to Gaspar de Guzmán, Count-Duke of Olivares, the "Portugal diamond" set with a pendant pearl, as a substitute for the famous La Peregrina pearl; to the Countess of Olivares, a diamond cross; to her daughter, Lady Maria de Guzman, a ring; four jewels each to the Duke of Híjar, the Marquis of Mondéjar, the King's Confessor, and the Bishop of Segovia; diamond rings for the gentlemen of the King's chamber; chains of gold for 14 pages, gold rings for the royal archers; to the Conde de la Puebla Maestre a chain of diamonds and a miniature of portrait of himself set with diamonds.

A ship, the Mary Rose, was sent to Spain to collect jewels returned to the English ambassador in July 1624. The ship was threatened by a storm during the return voyage.

== In popular fiction ==
William Harrison Ainsworth's 1865 novel The Spanish Match concerns itself with the journey to Spain and the negotiations. The visit of Prince Charles is the background of the novel El capitán Alatriste (1996) by Arturo Pérez-Reverte and its film adaptation.

In 2011, Sophia Institute Press released a novel based on historical events entitled The Spanish Match.

The Spanish Match is a large part of the plot in episode 7 of the Starz miniseries Mary & George.
