= The Flitch of Bacon =

The Flitch of Bacon may refer to:

- The Flitch of Bacon (opera), a 1778 comic opera composed by William Shield
- The Flitch of Bacon (novel), an 1854 novel by William Harrison Ainsworth

== See also ==
- Flitch of bacon custom, a traditional custom in England
