= St. James's (novel) =

1844 novel by William Harrison Ainsworth

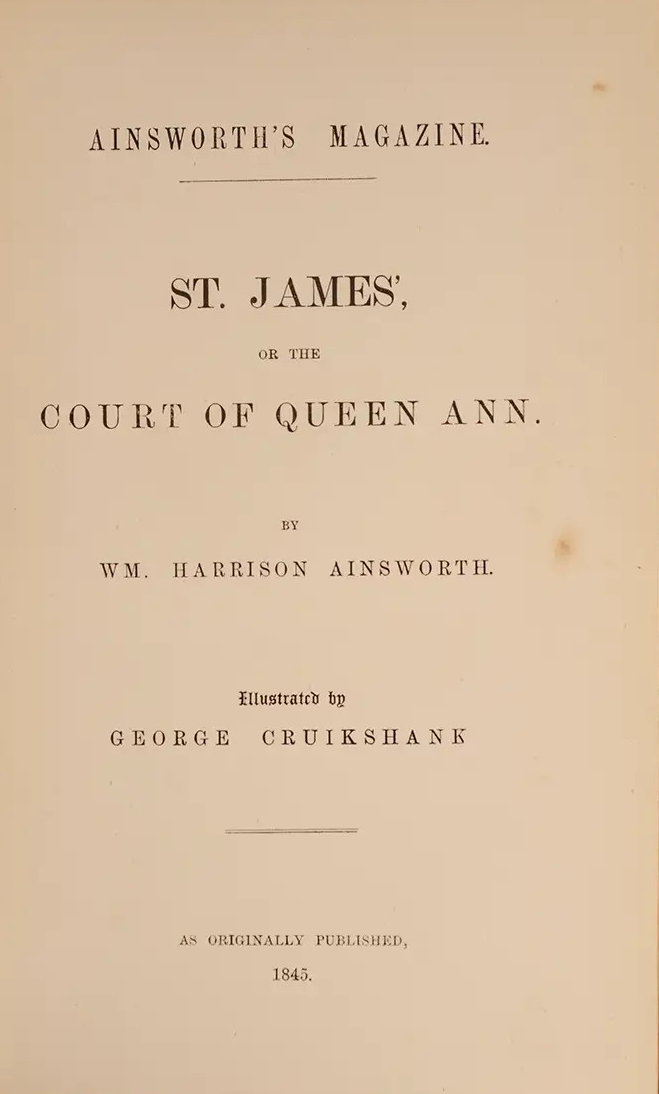
- Author: William Harrison Ainsworth
- Illustrator: George Cruikshank
- Language: English
- Genre: Historical
- Publisher: John Mortimer
- Publication date: 1844
- Publication place: United Kingdom
- Media type: Print

St. James's (also written as Saint James's) is a historical novel by William Harrison Ainsworth serially published in 1844. It describes the events surrounding the end of Queen Anne's reign and the dispute between the Duke and Duchess of Marlborough with two Tories for influence over the queen.

== Background ==
While Ainsworth served as editor for his own magazine, Ainsworth's Magazine, he included many of his own works. Of these, Saint James's or the Court of Queen Anne, An Historical Romance ran from January 1844 until December 1844. It was also published as a three volume set in 1844 by John Mortimer. The work was illustrated by George Cruikshank, which marks the last time that Ainsworth and Cruikshank collaborated on a novel.

== Story ==
Of all of Ainsworth's novels, the plot of St. James's is almost non-existent. The story takes place during the end of Queen Anne's reign. She was friends with the Duchess of Marlborough, and two Tories, Robert Harley and Henry St John, want to separate the Duchess and the queen. After plotting, they are finally able to separate the two, which allows them to remove the Duke of Marlborough from the queen's favour. Without the Duke around, Harley is made Earl of Oxford and St. John made Viscount of Bolingbroke. When Queen Anne dies, Harley and St. John turn against each other and soon lose their status at court.

=== Characters ===
- Queen Anne
- John Churchill, 1st Duke of Marlborough
- Sarah Churchill, Duchess of Marlborough
- Robert Harley, 1st Earl of Oxford and Earl Mortimer
- Henry St John, 1st Viscount Bolingbroke

=== Illustrations ===
The Ainsworth's Magazine edition of St. James's included 14 illustrations by Cruikshank. However, only seven appeared in the 3-volume edition of the work. Two of the illustrations not carried over in the book edition were of Cruikshank's best depictions: one titled "The Double Duel" and another titled "Sergeant Scales's Drum". A rift developed between Cruikshank and Ainsworth, and St. James's was the last work of Ainsworth that Cruikshank illustrated. It is possible that the rift came as Ainsworth was giving up his ownership of the Ainsworth's Magazine, but the cause is unknown. It is also possible that the dropping of illustrations from the three volume edition was either a cause or an effect of the rift.

== Themes ==
In terms of characters, Ainsworth's Queen Anne in Saint James's is controlled by fate and by others. When the novel starts, she is controlled by the Duchess of Marlborough. After the Duchess loses status, Queen Anne comes under the sway of Abigail Hill, a woman that is controlling the queen for Harley. Ainsworth uses the same kind of depiction for King James II, Queen Anne's father, in James the Second. In the opposite manner, King Henry VIII in Windsor Castle operates as the dominant figure and is unable to be controlled by others.

St. James's contains a seemingly contradictory stance in Ainsworth's political views; Ainsworth had Jacobite sympathies but he favours the Duke of Marlborough, even though the real individual betrayed the Stuarts and the Jacobite cause many times. This defence carried over to Ainsworth's criticism of William Makepeace Thackeray's depiction of the duke within the novel Esmond. In a letter to G. P. R. James on 26 October 1844, Ainsworth wrote, "One word as to my story. I know not whether my portraiture of Marlborough will please you. Very likely not. If I have painted him too much en beau, it is because almost every other writer has shaded his character too deeply; underrating his brilliant service, and dwelling upon his few failings, rather than upon his many and exalted qualities."

== Sources ==
St. James's is based on the events during Queen Anne's reign. In particular, it deals with the real events surrounding the Duke of Malborough and the political intrigue of Harley and St. John against him. Queen Anne's character reflects the description by the Duchess of Marlborough: "she certainly ... meant well and was not a fool; but nobody can maintain that she was wise, nor entertaining in conversation. she was in everything what I described her: ignorant in everything but what the parsons had taught her as a child." Other notable historical figures make minor appearances in the novel, including a dinner party hosted by St John in which those like William Congreve, John Vanbrugh, Joseph Addison, Richard Steele, Anne Oldfield and other notable politicians, writers, and actors attend.

== Critical response ==
In 1911, S. M. Ellis claims that the work "is in a very different category to the fine romances written by Ainsworth previously and to two, at least, that followed it; it has but little pretensions to literary merit, and the romantic glamour so characteristic, as a rule, of the author's work is lacking". This was followed by Worth as he explains that the work was "A relatively plotless and formless novel." Stephen Carver claims that Worth's description was correct and that it the problems could stem from history itself: "Perhaps it was the essentially wishy-washy nature of the reign of Queen Anne, the last Stuart sovereign, which made for such a dreary account of the Tories's successful strategy [...] to curv the political influence of the Duke and Duchess of Marlborough."
