= The Spanish Match (novel) =

1865 novel

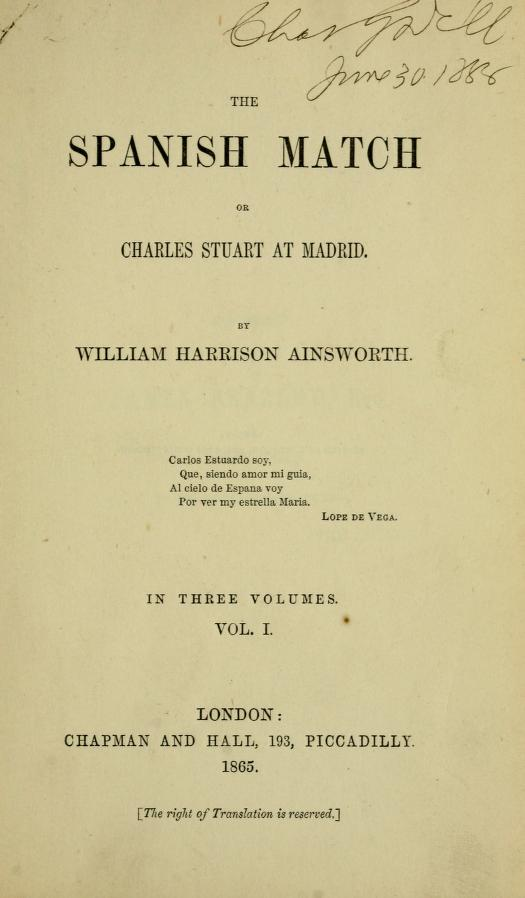
- Author: William Harrison Ainsworth
- Language: English
- Genre: Historical
- Publisher: Chapman and Hall
- Publication date: 1865
- Publication place: United Kingdom
- Media type: Print

The Spanish Match is an 1865 three-volume historical novel by the British writer William Harrison Ainsworth. It was originally serialised in Bentley's Miscellany under the alternative title House of the Seven Chimneys, a reference to the English Embassy in Spain. It was then published in London by Chapman and Hall. It is based on the historic Spanish match, a proposed marriage between the English and Spanish royal families in the 1620s.

== Synopsis ==
Charles, Prince of Wales travels incognito to Madrid in the company of his father's favourite the Duke of Buckingham in order to arrange a dynastic match with the Infanta Maria Anna, the sister of Philip IV of Spain. Complications ensue when they finally reach their destination, and the proposed marriage proves very controversial back in England.

== Bibliography ==
- Carver, Stephen James. The Life and Works of the Lancashire Novelist William Harrison Ainsworth, 1850-1882. Edwin Mellen Press, 2003.
- Ellis, Stewart Marsh. William Harrison Ainsworth and His Friends, Volume 2. Garland Publishing, 1979.
- Slater, John Herbert. Early Editions: A Bibliographical Survey of the Works of Some Popular Modern Authors. K. Paul, Trench, Trubner, & Company, 1894.
- Sutherland, John. The Longman Companion to Victorian Fiction. Routledge, 2014.
