= Preston Fight (novel) =

1875 novel

- Author: William Harrison Ainsworth
- Language: English
- Genre: Historical
- Publisher: Tinsley Brothers
- Publication date: 1875
- Publication place: United Kingdom
- Media type: Print

Preston Fight is an 1875 historical novel by the British author William Harrison Ainsworth, released in three volumes by the London publishing house Tinsley Brothers. Like his earlier novel The Manchester Rebels, it was set against the backdrop of a Jacobite uprising in this case the 1715 Jacobite rebellion. The main focus of the story is the rising in Northumberland and northern England rather than that in Scotland, although Scottish commander William Mackintosh plays a major role in the plot. It features an apocryphal visit by James Francis Edward Stuart to Northumberland in the period before the rising.

== Synopsis ==
In opposition to the Hanoverian Succession in 1714 a number of English northern landowners many of them Roman Catholic, lead a rebellion in support of the exiled Jacobite claimant to the throne against the reigning House of Hanover headed by George I. It culminates in the Battle of Preston and defeat for the Jacobites, several of whose leaders including Henry Oxburgh and the Earl of Derwentwater are taken to London for execution.

== Bibliography ==
- Carver, Stephen James. The Life and Works of the Lancashire Novelist William Harrison Ainsworth, 1850-1882. Edwin Mellen Press, 2003.
- Ellis, Stewart Marsh. William Harrison Ainsworth and His Friends, Volume 2. Garland Publishing, 1979.
- Slater, John Herbert. Early Editions: A Bibliographical Survey of the Works of Some Popular Modern Authors. K. Paul, Trench, Trubner, & Company, 1894.
