= Hablot Knight Browne =

British artist (1815–1882)

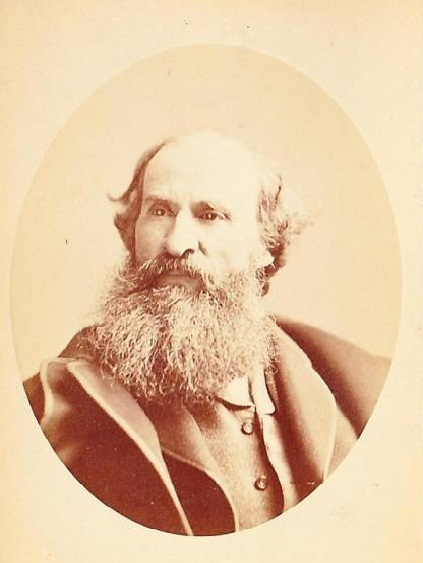
- Browne photographed by Sarony c.1870s
- Born: 10 July 1815; Lambeth, South London, England
- Died: 8 July 1882 (aged 66)
- Other names: Phiz
- Occupations: Artist; illustrator

Hablot Knight Browne (10 July 1815 – 8 July 1882) was a British artist and illustrator. Well known by his pen name, Phiz, he illustrated books by Charles Dickens, Charles Lever, Augustus Septimus Mayhew and Harrison Ainsworth.

== Early life ==
Of French Huguenot ancestry (the Browne surname was originally Bruneau), Hablot Knight Browne was born in England, in Lambeth (near London) on Kennington Lane. He was the fourteenth of Catherine and William Loder Browne's fifteen children. According to his biographer Valerie Browne Lester, Phiz was in fact the illegitimate son of his putative eldest sister Kate and Captain Nicholas Hablot of Napoleon's Imperial Guard. There is some uncertainty regarding the exact date of birth. 10 July 1815 is the date given by Valerie Browne Lester, his great-great-granddaughter. John Buchanan-Brown in his book Phiz!: Illustrator of Dickens' World says 12 July 1815. The date on his Christening record of 21 December 1815 at St Mary's Church, Lambeth, Surrey, England gives 11 June 1815, as does the Encyclopædia Britannica Eleventh Edition and 15 June 1815 (Dictionary of National Biography). A copy of the programme from his burial service, which is still owned by the Browne family, says he was born 10 July 1815.

When he was 7 years old, his father William Browne abandoned the family, changed his name to Breton and sailed with embezzled funds to Philadelphia where he became known for his watercolour paintings. William Browne was then declared dead by his wife Catherine.

Thomas Moxon, husband of William's sister Ann Loder Browne, helped to support the family, who were left badly off.

Browne was apprenticed to William Finden, an engraver, in whose studio he obtained his only artistic education. However, he was unsuited for engraving, and having during 1833 secured an important prize from the Society of Arts for a drawing of John Gilpin, he abandoned engraving in the following year and began other artistic work, with the ultimate object of becoming a painter.

== Career ==
In early 1836, he met Charles Dickens. It was at the time when Dickens was looking for someone to illustrate Pickwick. Browne became the illustrator of his little pamphlet Sunday under Three Heads. In the original edition of Pickwick, issued in shilling monthly parts from early in 1836 until the end of 1837, the first seven plates were drawn by Robert Seymour, who committed suicide in April 1836. The next two plates were by Robert William Buss.

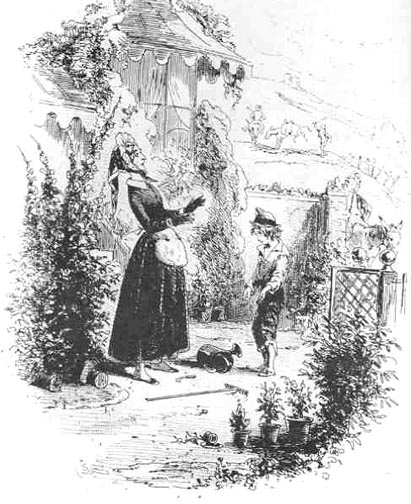
1849 etching for David Copperfield, titled "I make myself known to my aunt"

Browne and William Makepeace Thackeray visited the publishers' office with specimens of their work for Dickens's inspection. The novelist preferred Browne. Browne's first two etched plates for Pickwick were signed "Nemo", but the third was signed "Phiz", a pseudonym which was retained in future. When asked to explain why he chose this name he answered that the change from "Nemo" to "Phiz" was made to harmonize better with Dickens's "Boz".

Phiz developed the character Sam Weller graphically just as Seymour had developed Pickwick. Dickens and Phiz became good friends and in 1838 travelled together to Yorkshire to see the schools of which Nicholas Nickleby became the hero. They later made several other journeys together to facilitate the illustrator's work. Other Dickens characters illustrated by Phiz were Squeers, Micawber, Guppy, Major Bagstock, Mrs Gamp, Tom Pinch and David Copperfield.

Of the ten books by Dickens which Phiz illustrated, he is most known for David Copperfield, Pickwick, Dombey and Son, Martin Chuzzlewit and Bleak House. Browne made several drawings for Punch in his early days and also towards the end of his life. He designed the wrapper which was used for eighteen months from January 1842. He also contributed to Punch's Pocket Books.

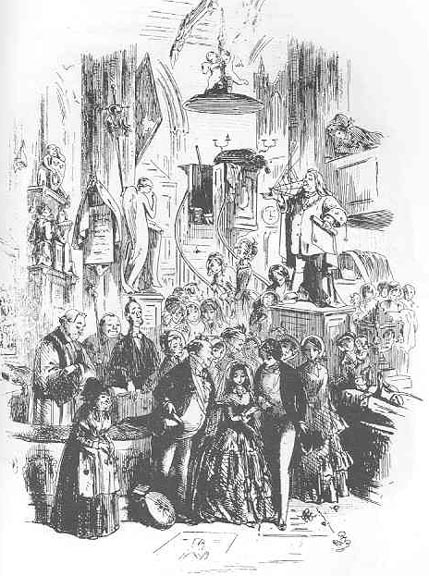
1850 etching for David Copperfield, titled "I am married"

In addition to his work for Dickens, Phiz illustrated more than twenty of Charles Lever's novels (among them The Confessions of Harry Lorrequer, Charles O'Malley, the Irish Dragoon, Jack Hinton, the Guardsman and The Knight of Gwynne). He also illustrated Harrison Ainsworth's and Frank Smedley's novels. Mervyn Clitheroe by Ainsworth is one of the most accomplished of the artist's works.

Most of Browne's work was etched on steel plates because these yielded a far larger edition than copper. Browne was annoyed at some of his etchings being transferred to stone by the publishers and printed as lithographic reproductions. Partly with the view to prevent this treatment of his work, he employed a machine to rule a series of lines over the plate in order to obtain what appeared to be a tint; when manipulated with acid this tint gave an effect somewhat resembling mezzotint, which at that time it was found practically impossible to transfer to stone.

== Death ==
Browne was in continual employment by publishers until 1867, when he suffered an illness that caused a degree of paralysis. After recovering, he produced many woodcuts. In 1878 he was awarded an annuity by the Royal Academy. His health gradually worsened until he died on 8 July 1882.

== Legacy ==
Four of his illustrations were issued as stamps by the Royal Mail in 2012 to mark the 200th anniversary of the birth of Charles Dickens.

== Gallery ==
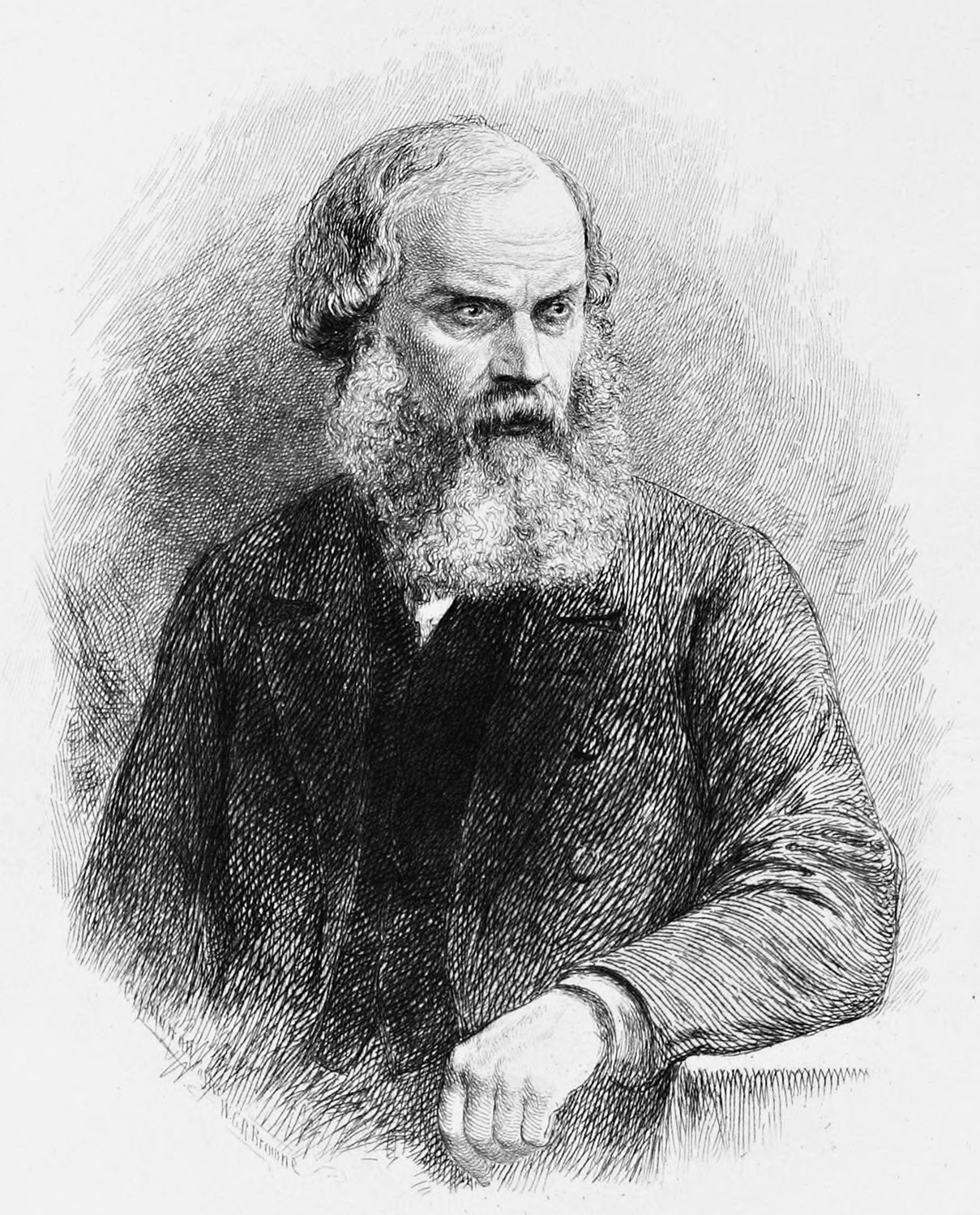
Portrait engraving

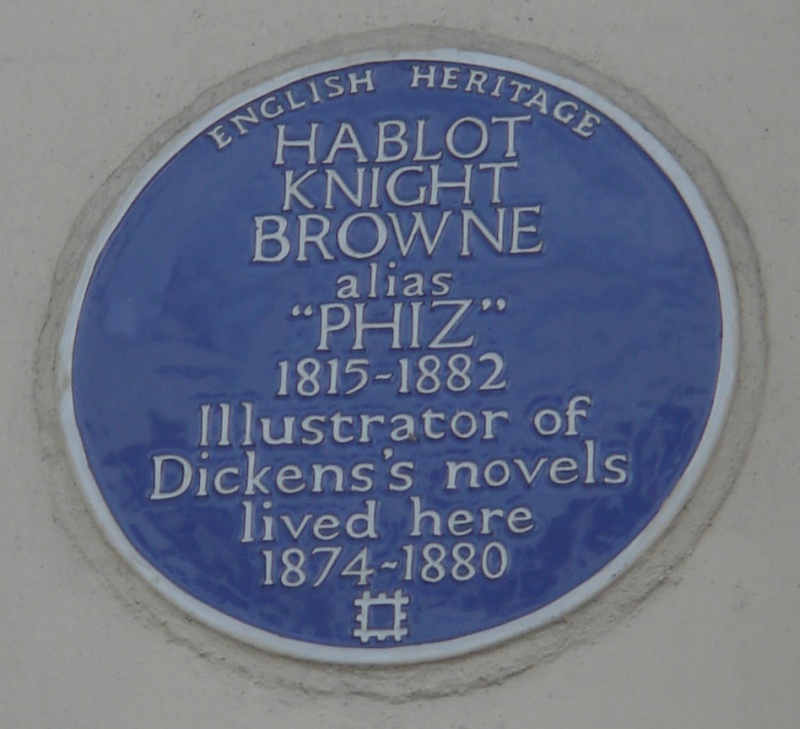
Blue plaque, Ladbroke Grove, London

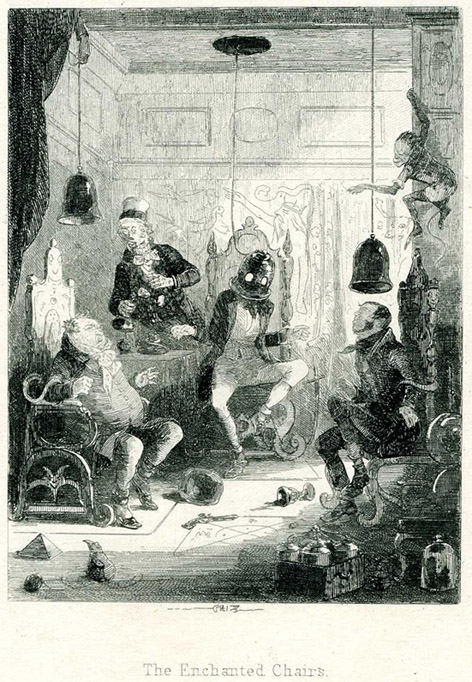
Scene from Auriol by Harrison Ainsworth, 1844

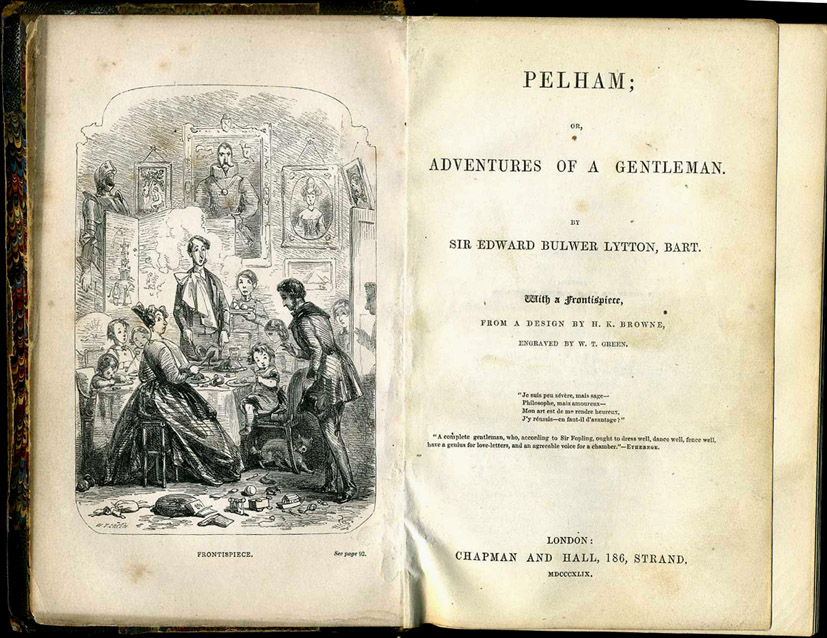
Frontispiece to Pelham by Edward Bulwer-Lytton, 1849

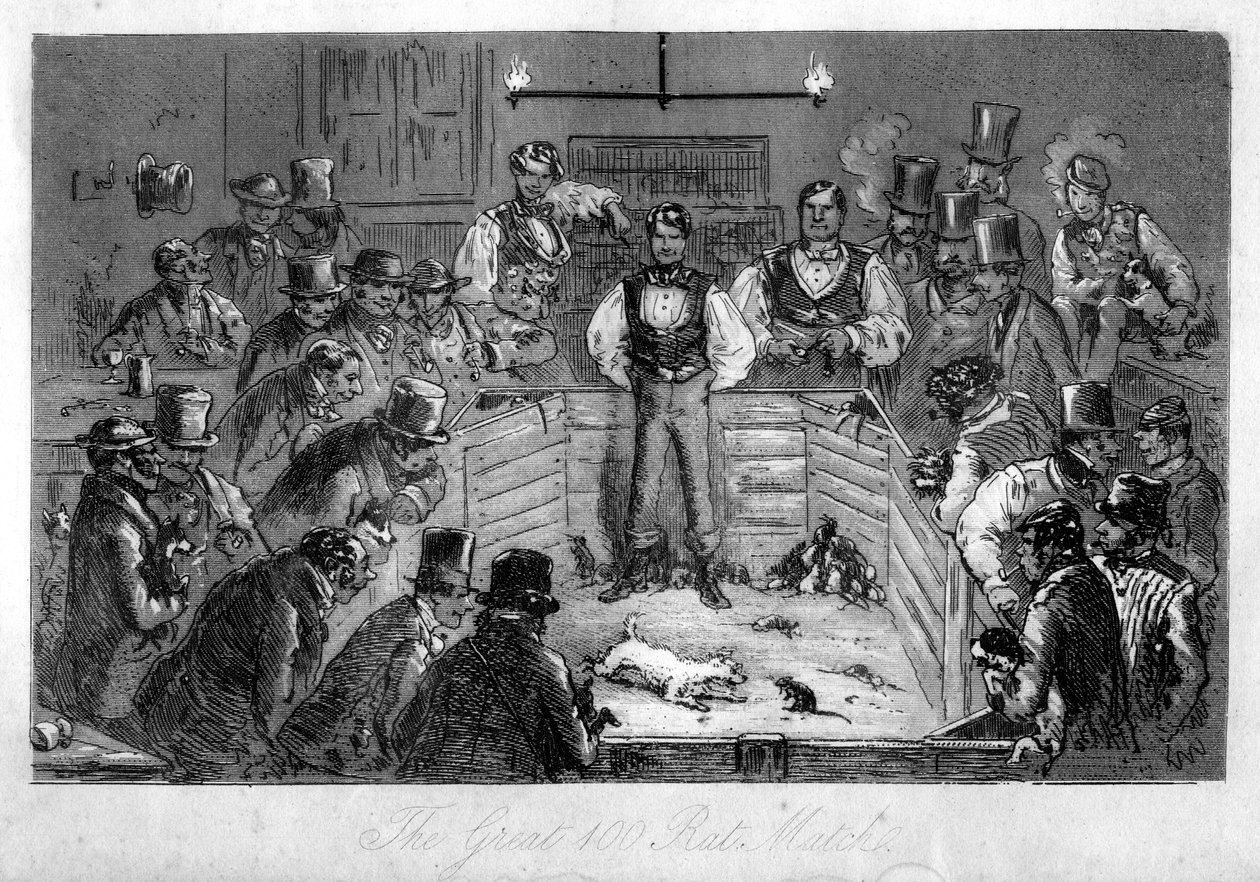
The Great 100 Rat Match, c.1858
