= Auriol (novel) =

1844 novel by William Harrison Ainsworth

Auriol: or, The Elixir of Life
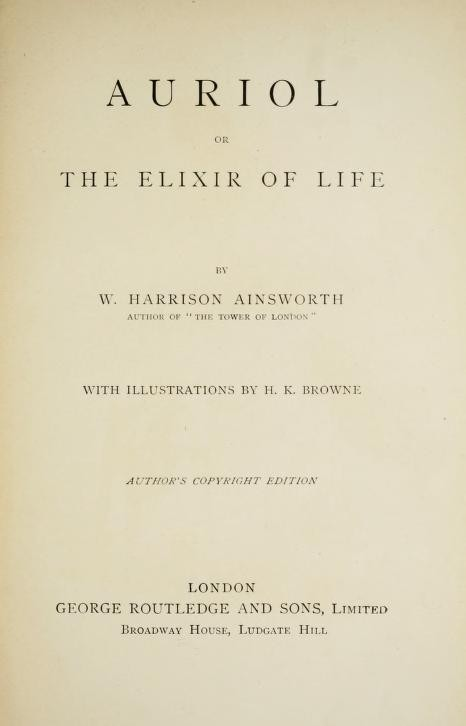
- Author: William Harrison Ainsworth
- Language: English
- Genre: Historical novel
- Publisher: Routledge
- Publication date: 1844
- Publication place: United Kingdom
- Media type: Print (hardback)
- Pages: 246 pp

Auriol: or, The Elixir of Life is a historical and gothic novel by British novelist William Harrison Ainsworth. It was first published in 1844 in serial form, under the title Revelations of London.

Auriol differs from Ainsworth's other works because the action is presented entirely as a fantasy, so that the supernatural element (which also occurs in Guy Fawkes and Windsor Castle) is more prominent. The story takes influence from the gothic romance and Faust genres. There is also a distinct connection with The Cabinet of Dr. Caligari, in the kidnapping of girls theme, and in that the story concludes in the atmosphere of the lunatic's confinement (and possible recovery), and the villain of the story is his keeper. Indeed, the use of the phantasmagorical aspects of the story to create a nightmarish commentary on contemporary society of the 1830s and 1840s anticipates (in the early 19th century) the expressionism of Robert Wiene's Caligari. German interest in English literature of this period is also suggested in the works of Edward Bulwer-Lytton (Rienzi and The Coming Race). Similarly it was John Gay and Dr Pepusch who provided the source-structure in The Beggar's Opera for Bertolt Brecht's Threepenny Opera. There is a characteristic series of illustrations by "Phiz".

== Plot ==
The novel opens in 1599, when Auriol Darcy is caught attempting to remove the heads of executed traitors from the Southwark Gateway of Old London Bridge. He is injured by the warder, Baldred, and carried to the house of Dr Lamb, an alchemist and Auriol Darcy's grandfather, who is assisted by his faithful dwarf Flapdragon. Lamb, on the point of discovering the elixir of life, has a seizure and dies as his ungrateful grandson consumes the draught.

The first book, set in 1830 and titled Ebba, shifts the narrative to London. Two criminals, known as Tinker and Sandman, attempt to rob an unidentified gentleman near Vauxhall Bridge Road, but are interrupted, and the injured man is carried unconscious to the home of Mr Thorneycroft, a scrap-iron dealer. While he convalesces and falls in love with Ebba, the iron-dealer's daughter, Tinker and Sandman and their associate Ginger (a 'dog-fancier' who steals dogs and resells them) discover in the gentleman's pocket-book the private diary of a man who has lived for over two hundred years, and has committed nameless crimes. Auriol (for it is he) seeks to dissuade Ebba from her love, for he bears an awful doom. A tall sinister stranger has Auriol in his power, and employs a dwarf (who is Flapdragon) to recover the pocket-book. The stranger confronts Auriol and informs his that Ebba must be surrendered to him according to their contract. Auriol refuses, but Ebba is snatched from him, and he is imprisoned, during a nocturnal assignation at a picturesque ruin near Millbank Street. Tinker, Sandman and Ginger offer their services to Mr Thorneycroft to attempt her rescue. Ebba is conveyed to a mysterious darkened chamber where the stranger demands that she sign a scroll surrendering herself body and soul to him. She calls to heaven for protection: in the darkness a tomb is revealed and opened by menacing cowled figures, and Auriol is brought forth. Ebba hurls herself into the tomb to precede him and save him, but then re-emerges silent and cowled to sign the scroll.

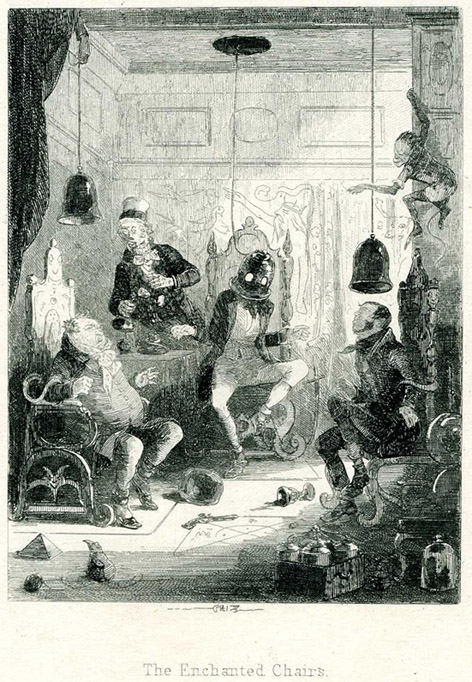
Phiz illustration: Mr Thorneycroft, Sandman and Tinker in the enchanted chairs, observed by Ginger.

An intervening section set in 1800 recounts the earlier history of Cyprian Rougemont. He visits a deserted mansion at Stepney Green and discovers a hidden ancestral vault. There, he finds the portrait of his ancestor of the same name, a Rosicrucian brother of the 16th century and a member of the Illuminati. Satan has appeared to him in a dream and promised him an ancestral treasure, the price for which is his own soul, or that of Auriol Darcy. Cyprian strikes the portrait and a plaque falls away, revealing the access to the ancestral tomb. There in a seven-sided vault lit by the ever-burning lamp and painted with kabbalistic symbols he finds the uncorrupt body with a book of mysteries, a vial of infernal potion, and a series of chests filled with gold, silver and jewels. With use of the potion, he lures Auriol into a compact whereby he is given a magnificent mansion in St James's Square and £120,000, in exchange for a female victim whenever Rougemont requires one from him. Thus, Auriol can win the woman he loves, Elizabeth Talbot; but Rougemont, once the contract is signed, demands Elizabeth Talbot as his first victim, in a week's time. Auriol seeks to defy him and to marry her within the week, but he is thwarted and Elizabeth is abducted on the seventh night.

In the second book, also set in 1830 and titled Cyprian Rougemont, the narrative follows Thorneycroft and his companions as they enter a series of traps within Rougemont’s mansion. Thorneycroft, Sandman and Tinker (with Ginger) continue their pursuit led by another, who is the brother of Rougemont's second victim, Clara Paston. They enter a mysterious mansion, and becoming trapped in a chamber and locked into enchanted or mechanically contrived chairs three of them are muffled by bell-masks which descend from the ceiling, and then plunged through traps in the floor. Flapdragon appears and attempts to help them find Ebba, while Paston, Ginger and Thorneycroft find Rougemont and confront him with pistols, but Rougemont is impervious to the bullets. Thorneycroft, Tinker and Sandman are trapped in a pit over which an iron roof closes by a giant mechanical contrivance, and Ebba is never found again. Auriol, meanwhile, awakes to find himself in Elizabethan costume, chained in a vaulted dungeon. The voice of Rougemont addresses him, telling him that he has been mad, but that he has given him a potion to heal him, and is his keeper. James I is now the King of England. Old Dr Lamb is still living, and his dwarf Flapdragon, and Auriol is taken to him, where they begin to hope that Auriol's cure has been effected. He becomes convinced that he has lived centuries in a few nights and has awakened from a delusion... but even in the last sentence, addressing Dr Lamb, the author relates what he says to his supposed grandsire.
