= Myddleton Pomfret =

1868 novel by William Harrison Ainsworth

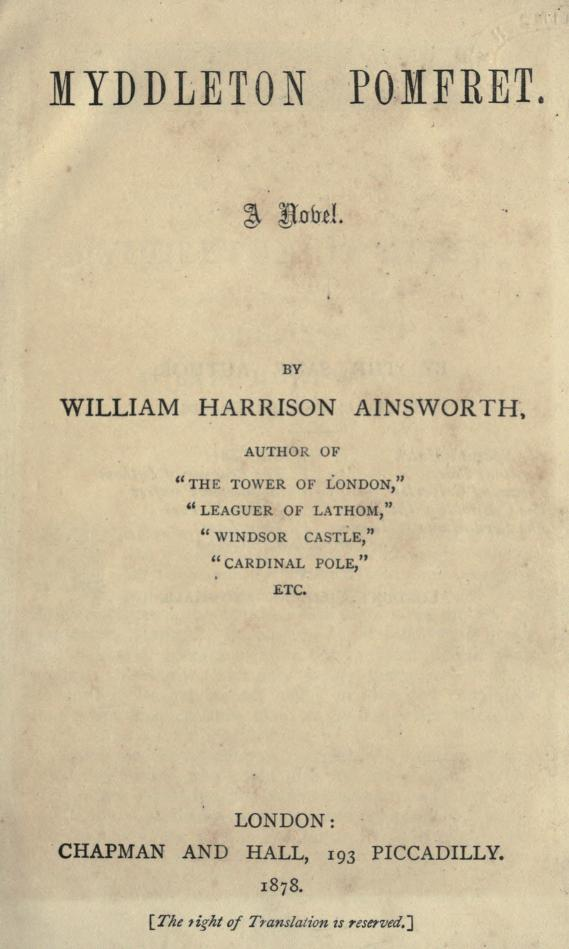
- Author: William Harrison Ainsworth
- Language: English
- Genre: Drama
- Publisher: Chapman and Hall
- Publication date: 1868
- Publication place: United Kingdom
- Media type: Print

Myddleton Pomfret is an 1868 novel by the British writer William Harrison Ainsworth, published in three volumes by Chapman and Hall. It was originally serialised in Bentley's Miscellany between July 1867 and March 1868. This was the last of his novels to feature in the magazine which ceased publication in 1868.

Ainsworth was known for historical novels, but in the late 1860s in an effort to counter flagging sales he produced three novels with contemporary settings including Old Court (1867) and Hilary St Ives (1870). Only three other novels in his large body of work, including Mervyn Clitheroe (1858), are set in the present.

== Bibliography ==
- Carver, Stephen James. The Life and Works of the Lancashire Novelist William Harrison Ainsworth, 1850-1882. Edwin Mellen Press, 2003.
- Slater, John Herbert. Early Editions: A Bibliographical Survey of the Works of Some Popular Modern Authors. K. Paul, Trench, Trubner, & Company, 1894.
- Sutherland, Joan. The Stanford Companion to Victorian Fiction. Santford University Press, 1989.
