= John Ebers =

British operatic manager

John Ebers (baptised 1778 – 8 December 1858) was an English operatic manager, notable for his promotion of Italian opera in London in the 1820s.

== Early life ==
Ebers was born in Hertford, and was baptised there at St. Andrew's Church on 24 July 1778. Around 1810 he took over his father's bookselling business at 27 Old Bond Street, He seems to have been commercially successful, as he is described, at the beginning of his career as a manager, as 'an opulent bookseller in Bond Street, who has been largely engaged in the interests of the holders of property-boxes for some years'. From this it would seem that he had acted as a kind of ticket agent.

== First Italian opera season ==
In 1820 the London season of Italian opera at the King's Theatre had come to a premature end, after its director had fled the country leaving the orchestra unpaid. Ebers, who had lent money to the theatre and had the assignment of several of the opera' s boxes as part of his ticket-selling business, took on the task of theatre management, but relied on his musical director, William Ayrton, to bring matters into a more satisfactory state.

At first Ebers became the lessee of the theatre for one year only, and on 10 March 1821 the house opened with La gazza ladra, the first time that it had been heard in England. As compared with the former seasons, this year was eminently successful, although it seems to have been the general opinion that the manager's promises with regard to the excellence of the singers had not been fulfilled. Violante Camporese, who appeared as Donna Anna in Don Giovanni with the greatest success, had been engaged at a salary of 1,550l. Giuseppina Ronzi de Begnis, her husband, the bass Giuseppe de Begnis, and Alberico Curioni seem to have been the only other singers whose performances gave unmingled satisfaction. Rossini's Il turco in Italia was the only other novelty produced during the season; but in spite of this somewhat modest inauguration of his management, Ebers seems to have been commercially successful.

== Second season ==
In 1822, Ebers ventured to take a four years' lease of the theatre from a banker named Chambers, who owned the theatre at the time. Ayrton seems to have been uniformly unfortunate in his relations with managers, for the connection between him and Ebers was dissolved that year. A Signor Petracchi, conductor at La Scala, Milan, was summoned to succeed him, and a board of directors, consisting of various noblemen, was associated with the management of the undertaking. The strength of the company was increased by the addition of Maria Caterina Rosalbina Caradori-Allan and Pierre Begrez. The productions of the year were Rossini's Pietro l'eremita (i.e. Mosè in Egitto) and Otello, Giuseppe Mosca's I pretendenti delusi, and Giovanni Pacini's Il barone di Dolsheim, both of which last failed. In spite of this, the season was on the whole successful. In 1823 the management was placed in the hands of a committee, under a certain guarantee to Ebers. Rossini's La donna del lago, Ricciardo e Zoraide, Matilde di Shabran and Saverio Mercadante's Elisa e Claudio were produced. Although the bad accounts of the season which are to be read in the 'Harmonicon' for 1823 must be taken with a grain of salt (Ayrton was the editor of the paper, which appeared first in that year), it is still to be perceived that the affairs of the theatre were in an unsatisfactory state. Lucia Elizabeth Vestris was the only addition to the company, and Violante Camporese retired at the end of the season.

== Subsequent seasons ==
Ebers now sublet the theatre for two years to Giovanni Battista Benelli, who had been assistant stage manager. In January 1824 the season opened with Rossini's Zelmira with Isabella Colbran in the principal part, the composer himself being advertised to be present. He had undertaken to write an opera, Ugo, re d'Italia, but it was never finished. Pasta made her appearance on 24 April, and the season lasted, in spite of enormous losses, until 14 August, shortly after which Benelli decamped, leaving Rossini and the artists unpaid. The matter came before the courts, with Ebers appealing to the Lord Chancellor to put him again into the management of the theatre. The particulars of the actions may be read in the 'Quarterly Musical Magazine,’ vi. 516–521. It was generally considered that the engagement of Rossini was unwise; but the patronage bestowed by the fashionable world had been so great that Ebers felt justified in announcing a new season, returning again to the directorship of Ayrton. The fact that the leases of the 'property-boxes' were to fall in at the end of 1825 gave a prospect of success. His prospectus is more or less apologetic, but he had secured the services of a fairly good company, and in the course of the season Pasta was prevailed on to accept a portion of the salary due to her from the previous year in lieu of the whole amount, and to return to London.

The board of works declaring the King's Theatre to be unsafe, the Haymarket Theatre was taken for a time, from the beginning of March until the middle of April. Rossini's Semiramide was brought out on 20 June, and Giacomo Meyerbeer's Il crociato in Egitto on 23 July, for the first appearance of Giovanni Velluti, the castrato, who was one of the great attractions of the year. At the end of the season Ayrton again retired, possibly on account of a difficulty which the management had had with Manuel García, the correspondence relating to which is published in the 'Quarterly Musical Magazine,’ vii. 188–91. In November, Velluti was appointed director, and the new season was announced to begin on the last day of the old year. It began on 7 January 1826, when great dissatisfaction was caused by the substitution of many inexperienced orchestral performers for those who had played for many seasons. Francesco Morlacchi's Tebaldo ed Isolina was produced without success on 25 February. In May Pasta appeared, and drew large audiences. Velluti's voice began to give out at the end of the season, and Ebers's choice of Rossini's Aureliano in Palmira for his benefit, 22 June, did not add to his popularity. He got into trouble concerning the pay to the chorus on this occasion, and the matter was decided against him in the sheriff's court. On 12 August the season came to an abrupt end, several performances being still due. In the next season Carlo Coccia, the conductor, resigned his post, and after considerable difficulty his place was taken by Nicolas-Charles Bochsa, who had undertaken two seasons of oratorios at the King's Theatre without any success, was now appointed director, and on 2 December the house opened with Gasparo Spontini's La vestale. Pacini's La schiava in Bagdad and Coccia's Maria Stuarda were produced, and on 7 August the theatre again closed prematurely. At the end of the year Ebers, being unable to pay the enormous rent demanded of him by the assignees of Chambers, became a bankrupt.

== Ainsworth ==
In 1826, the young Harrison Ainsworth, having qualified as a lawyer, joined Ebers's bookselling business as a partner. Ebers had earlier published Ainsworth's first novel (Sir John Chiverton, written in collaboration with J. Ashton). In October 1826 Ainsworth married Ebers's daughter Anne Frances (Fanny), and the couple moved in with Ebers. Ainsworth almost certainly assisted Ebers in writing his memoirs, Seven Years of the Kings Theatre (1828). However he quit his business partnership with Ebers in 1829.

== Later years ==
Messrs. Chambers at first intended to carry on the undertaking themselves, but they ultimately let the theatre to a certain Laurent, who was also lessee of the Théâtre Italien in Paris. After a year he was succeeded by Pierre François Laporte. In 1828 Ebers published his Seven Years of the King's Theatre, a book put together with some skill, and in its way an entertaining history of his career. He lays before the public all his accounts, in order to justify his own position, and on the whole it must be admitted to be a valuable contribution to the history of the Italian opera in England. After his failure as a manager, he resumed his business as a bookseller and stationer. His name appears in the directories as the proprietor of the business at 27 Old Bond Street down to 1830; in 1831 the style is John Ebers & Co., and from 1836 onwards the name is given as S. Ebers & Co. An Emily S. Ebers, who may have been his daughter, carried on the business, being called in the directory 'opera agent,’ until 1863.

Ebers died on 8 December 1858 in Kensington, London, and was buried in Kensal Green Cemetery.

== See also ==
- Her Majesty's Theatre
