= Sir John Chiverton =

1826 novel

- Author: William Harrison Ainsworth
- Language: English
- Genre: Historical
- Publisher: John Ebers
- Publication date: 1826
- Publication place: United Kingdom
- Media type: Print

Sir John Chiverton is an 1826 historical novel by the British writer William Harrison Ainsworth. His debut novel it was published anonymously by the London publisher John Ebers whose daughter Anne he would marry the same year. Ainsworth later acknowledged authorship of it. He was twenty years old when he wrote it, drawing inspiration from Hulme Hall which he had grown up near, although his schoolfriend John Partington Aston claimed to have co-written the book and is sometimes credited as co-author. It is a Gothic tale set during the Elizabethan era and strongly resembles the Waverley series of novels by Walter Scott, a leading figure of the Romantic movement who was then at the height of his success. Scott was aware of the book and noted it in his diary as one of the more notable "imitators" of his work. He followed it with another Gothic novel Rookwood in 1834

== Bibliography ==
- Carver, Stephen James. The Life and Works of the Lancashire Novelist William Harrison Ainsworth, 1850-1882. Edwin Mellen Press, 2003.
- Maxwell, Richard. The Historical Novel in Europe, 1650-1950. Cambridge University Press, 2009.
- Williams, Anthony. The Representation of London in Regency and Victorian Drama. Edwin Mellen Press, 2000.
- Worth, George John. William Harrison Ainsworth. Twayne Publishers, 1972.
