= James the Second (novel) =

1848 novel

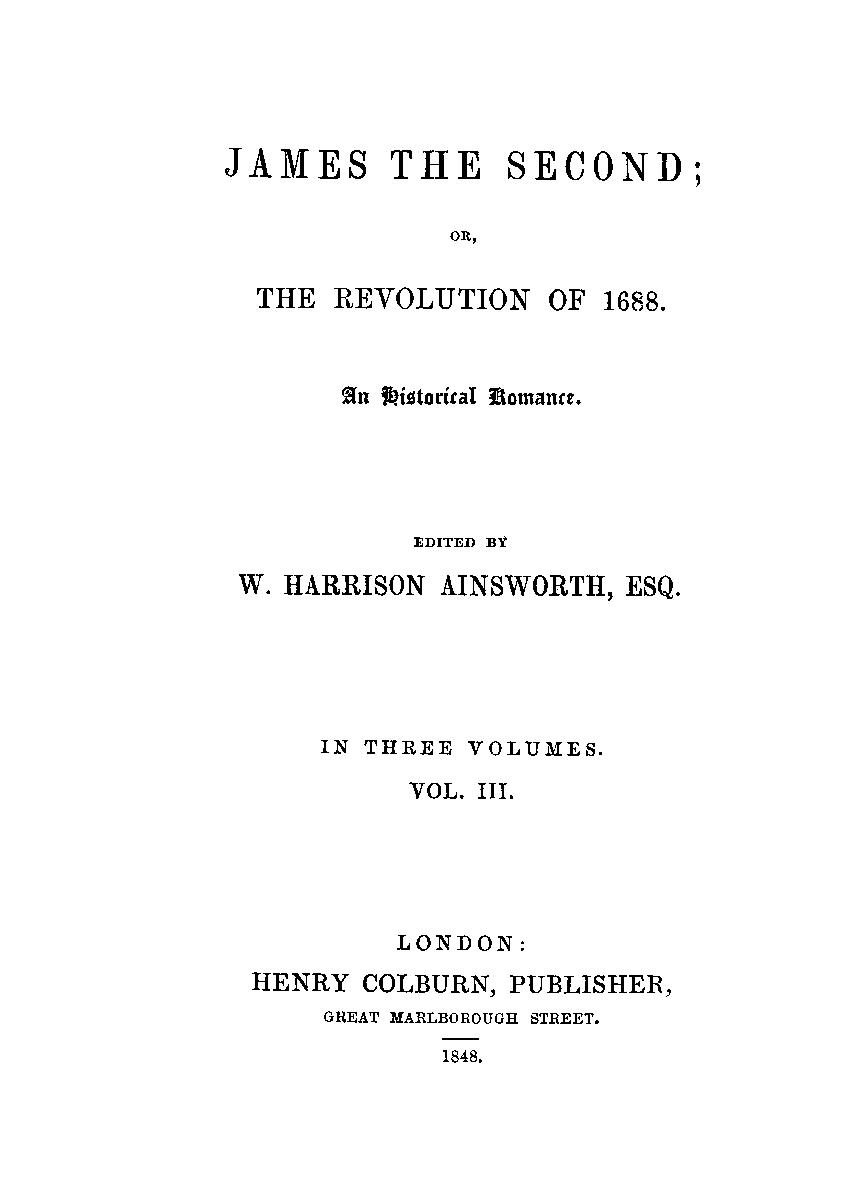
- Author: William Harrison Ainsworth
- Language: English
- Genre: Historical
- Publisher: Henry Colburn
- Publication date: 1848
- Publication place: United Kingdom
- Media type: Print

James the Second is an 1848 historical novel by the British writer William Harrison Ainsworth. It was published in three volumes by Henry Colburn. It is set during the reign of James II and the Glorious Revolution of 1688. It was published the same year as a series of European revolutions broke out.

== Bibliography ==
- Bloom, Harold (ed.) The Victorian Novel. Infobase Publishing, 2004.
- Carver, Stephen James. The Life and Works of the Lancashire Novelist William Harrison Ainsworth, 1850–1882. Edwin Mellen Press, 2003.
- Ellis, Stewart Marsh. William Harrison Ainsworth and His Friends, Volume 2. Garland Publishing, 1979.
- Slater, John Herbert. Early Editions: A Bibliographical Survey of the Works of Some Popular Modern Authors. K. Paul, Trench, Trubner, & Company, 1894.
