= The Flitch of Bacon (novel) =

1854 novel

- Author: William Harrison Ainsworth
- Language: English
- Genre: Historical
- Publisher: Routledge
- Publication date: 1854
- Publication place: United Kingdom
- Media type: Print

The Flitch of Bacon is an 1854 historical novel by the British writer William Harrison Ainsworth. It was originally serialised in The New Monthly Magazine. He based it on the tradition of the Flitch of Bacon at Little Dunmow in Essex, awarded to the happiest married couple. It inspired a revival of the practice, with Ainsworth judging a competition the following year.

== Bibliography ==
- Bragg, Tom. Space and Narrative in the Nineteenth-Century British Historical Novel. Routledge, 2016.
- Carver, Stephen James. The Life and Works of the Lancashire Novelist William Harrison Ainsworth, 1850-1882. Edwin Mellen Press, 2003.
- Simpson, Jacqueline. Green Men and White Swans: The Folklore of British Pub Names. Random House, 2011.
