= Old Court (novel) =

1867 novel

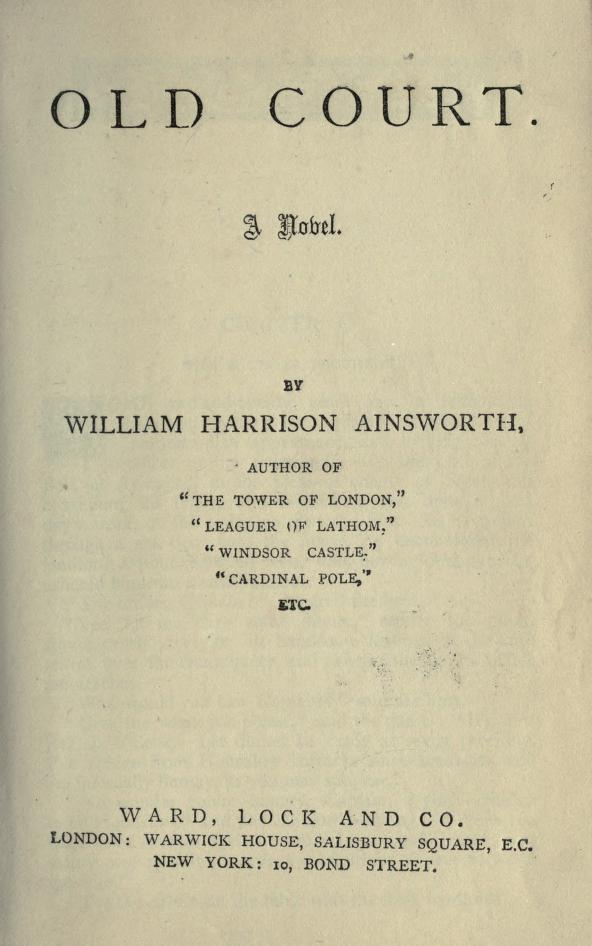
- Author: William Harrison Ainsworth
- Language: English
- Genre: Drama
- Publisher: Chapman and Hall
- Publication date: 1867
- Publication place: United Kingdom
- Media type: Print

Old Court is an 1867 novel by the British writer William Harrison Ainsworth. It was initially serialised in Bentley's Miscellany before being published in three volumes by Chapman and Hall of London. It was the first of three novels in a row with present-day settings, in contrast to the historical novels for which the author was known for.

== Bibliography ==
- Carver, Stephen James. The Life and Works of the Lancashire Novelist William Harrison Ainsworth, 1850-1882. Edwin Mellen Press, 2003.
- Slater, John Herbert. Early Editions: A Bibliographical Survey of the Works of Some Popular Modern Authors. K. Paul, Trench, Trubner, & Company, 1894.
- Sutherland, Joan. The Stanford Companion to Victorian Fiction. Santford University Press, 1989.
