= 1866 in literature =

This article contains information about the literary events and publications of 1866.

== Events ==
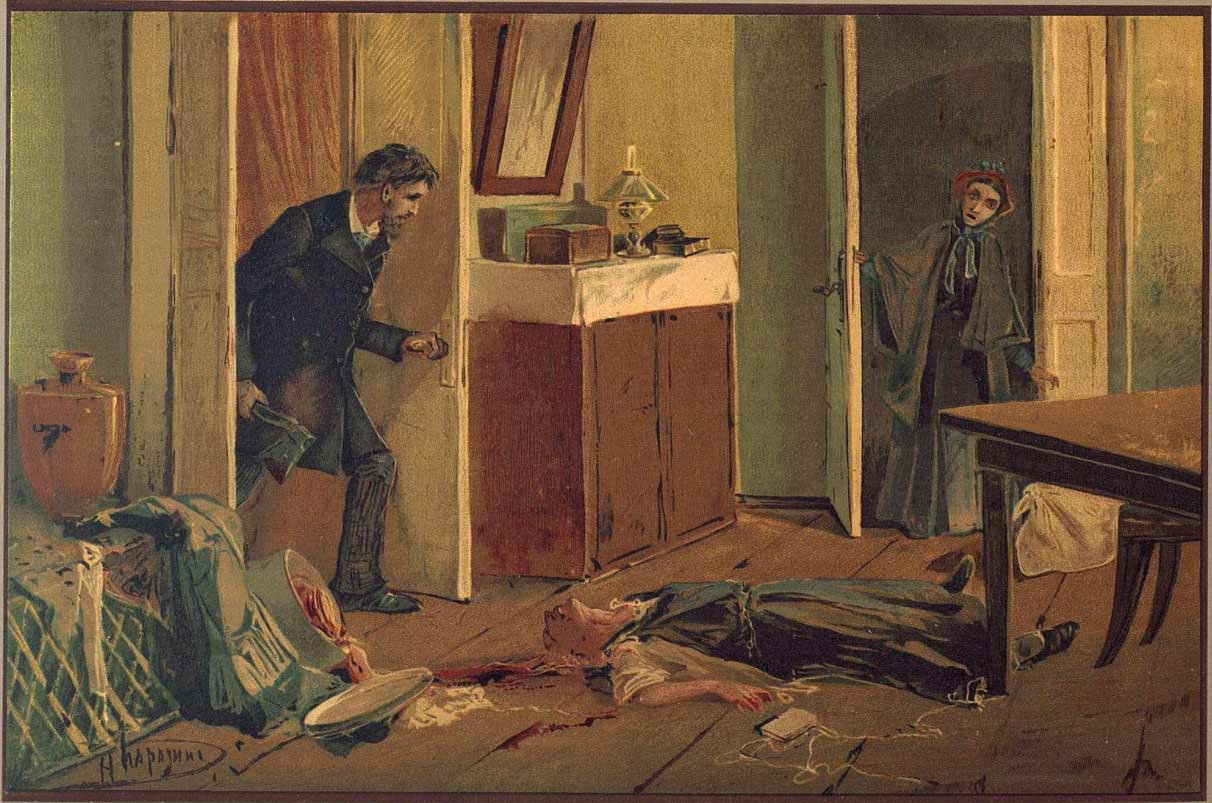
Rodion Raskolnikov kills the pawnbroker in Crime and Punishment(illustration by Nikolay Karazin, 1893)

- January – Fyodor Dostoyevsky's novel Crime and Punishment («Преступлéние и наказáние», Prestupleniye i nakazaniye) is serialized through the year in the monthly literary magazine Russkiy Vestnik («Русскій Вѣстникъ», The Russian Messenger). His novella The Gambler («Игрок», Igrok) is dictated to his future wife to meet a publisher deadline of November 1. The novella was dictated to one of the first stenographers in the Russian Empire, the 19-year-old Anna Grigorevna Snitkina, who transcribed the writer's notes and copied it neatly out for him. With her help, Dostoyevsky was able to finish the book in time. Dostoyevsky later married Snitkina.
- July – Anthony Trollope's novel Nina Balatka: The Story of a Maiden of Prague is initially published anonymously (serialisation in Blackwood's Magazine July 1866–January 1867). Trollope is interested in discovering whether his books sell on their own merits or as a consequence of the author's name and reputation.
- September 8 – London publisher Samuel Orchart Beeton is obliged by the financial panic of 1866 to settle all his debts by selling his property. He sells his titles and name to Ward Lock & Co.
- November – The American magazine for children Children's Hour publishes its first issue.
- unknown dates
  - Ludwig Anzengruber returns to Vienna after working as a travelling actor.
  - Charles Baudelaire's collection Les Épaves is published in Belgium, containing poems from Les Fleurs du mal (Paris, 1857) that were suppressed for outraging public morality.
  - Luigi Capuana becomes a theatre critic for the Italian newspaper The Nation.
  - Josip Jurčič has Deseti brat ("The Tenth Brother") published, as the first full-length novel in Slovene.
  - Nandshankar Mehta publishes Karana Ghelo ("The Idiot King Karana"), the first novel in Gujarati.
  - Hesba Stretton's children's story Jessica's First Prayer is serialized in Sunday at Home (U.K.) As a book, it sells one and half million copies.
  - Algernon Charles Swinburne's first collection Poems and Ballads causes a sensation on publication in London, especially the ones written in homage to Sappho and the sadomasochistic "Dolores (Notre-Dame des Sept Douleurs)". Under threat of prosecution, his original publisher, Moxon and Co., transfers publication rights to the more liberal John Camden Hotten.
  - The Stockholm Reading Parlor (Stockholms läsesalong) is co-founded by Sophie Adlersparre in Sweden; it becomes a free library for women to improve their access to education.
  - The first detective fiction by women authors is published: the dime novel The Dead Letter, an American Romance by "Seeley Regester" (Metta Victoria Fuller Victor) in New York City as the first full-length American work of crime fiction, having begun to appear serially in the January Beadle's Monthly; Mary Fortune's story "The Dead Witness, or the Bush waterhole" is published in the Australian Journal on January 20.
  - Charles Dickens publishes "Mugby Junction" as a Christmas supplement to his magazine All the Year Round (London), containing short stories by himself (including "The Signal-Man") and by Charles Collins, Amelia B. Edwards, Andrew Halliday and Hesba Stretton.

== New books ==
=== Fiction ===
- Louisa May Alcott (as A. M. Barnard) – "Behind a Mask, or A Woman's Power" (novella published in The Flag of Our Union)
- R. D. Blackmore – Cradock Nowell
- Bankim Chandra Chattopadhyay – Kapalkundala
- Wilkie Collins – Armadale (serialization completed and in book form)
- John Esten Cooke – Surry of Eagle's-Nest
- Alphonse Daudet – Letters From My Windmill (Lettres de mon moulin)
- Fyodor Dostoyevsky – Crime and Punishment
- Alexandre Dumas, fils – L'Affaire Clemenceau
- George Eliot – Felix Holt, the Radical
- Augusta Jane Evans – St. Elmo
- John William De Forest – Miss Ravenel's Conversion from Secession to Loyalty
- Émile Gaboriau – L'Affaire Lerouge
- Elizabeth Gaskell (died 1865) – Wives and Daughters (serialization completed and in book form)
- Victor Hugo – Toilers of the Sea (Les Travailleurs de la mer)
- George MacDonald – Annals of a Quiet Neighbourhood
- John Neal — Little Moccasin, or Along the Madawaska: A Story of Life and Love in the Lumber Region
- Mrs Oliphant – Miss Marjoribanks
- Ouida – Chandos
- Charles Reade – Griffith Gaunt
- Emmanuel Rhoides – Ἡ Πάπισσα Ἰωάννα (I Papissa Ioanna, Pope Joan)
- Felicia Skene (anonymously) – Hidden Depths
- Anthony Trollope – Nina Balatka and "The Belton Estate"
- Frances Eleanor Trollope – Aunt Margaret's Trouble
- José Milla y Vidaurre – La Hija del Adelantado

=== Children ===
- Anna Harriett Drury – The Three Half-Crowns : a story for boys
- James Greenwood – The True History of a Little Ragamuffin
- Hesba Stretton – Jessica's First Prayer

=== Drama ===
- Dion Boucicault – Rip van Winkle or The Sleep of Twenty Years
- Alexandre Dumas, fils – Heloise Paranquet
- Henrik Ibsen – Brand
- T. W. Robertson – Ours
- Dobri Voynikov – Princess Rayna

=== Poetry ===
- Charles Baudelaire – Les Épaves
- Algernon Charles Swinburne – Poems and Ballads
- Paul Verlaine – Poèmes saturniens, including "Chanson d'automne"

=== Non-fiction ===
- Teodor Boldur-Lățescu – Adivărul adivărat (Truth and Nothing But)
- William Wells Brown – The Negro in the American Rebellion
- Edward Bruce Hamley – The Operations of War Explained and Illustrated
- Friedrich Albert Lange – History of Materialism and Critique of its Present Importance (Geschichte des Materialismus und Kritik seiner Bedeutung in der Gegenwart, published October 1865 but dated 1866)
- Edward A. Pollard – The Lost Cause
- John Robert Seeley (anonymously) – Ecce Homo: A Survey in the Life and Work of Jesus Christ
- Charles Haddon Spurgeon – The Wordless Book
- Benjamin Thorpe assisted by Elise Otté (translator) – Edda Sæmundar Hinns Frôða: the Edda of Sæmund the Learned, from the old Norse or Icelandic

== Births ==
- January 2 (December 21, 1865 OS) – Gheorghe Bogdan-Duică (Gheorghe Bogdan), Romanian literary critic (died 1934)
- January 29 – Romain Rolland, French dramatist, novelist and Nobel Prize-winner (died 1944)
- February 9 – George Ade, American columnist and playwright (died 1944)
- February 24 – Arthur Pearson, English writer and newspaper publisher (died 1921)
- March 2
  - John Gray, English poet (died 1934)
  - Sibyl Marvin Huse, French-born American author and teacher (died 1939)
- March 7 – Walter Howard, English playwright (died 1922)
- March 16 – E. K. Chambers, English literary scholar (died 1954)
- May 2 – Paul Kretschmer, German linguist (died 1956)
- July 28 – Beatrix Potter, English children's writer and illustrator (died 1943)
- August 12 – Jacinto Benavente, Spanish dramatist and Nobel Prize-winner (died 1954)
- August 16 – Dora Sigerson, Irish poet (died 1918)
- September 7 – Tristan Bernard, French writer (died 1947)
- August 31 – Elizabeth von Arnim, née Mary Annette Beauchamp, Australian-born novelist (died 1941)
- September 21 – H. G. Wells, English novelist and social commentator (died 1946)
- October 28 – Ramón del Valle-Inclán, Spanish dramatist and novelist (died 1936)
- November 4 – Jane Findlater, Scottish novelist (died 1946)
- November 21 – Dusé Mohamed Ali, Egyptian-born political activist, journalist and dramatist (died 1945)
- unknown date – Edith Escombe, English fiction writer and essayist (died 1950)

== Deaths ==
- January 23 – Thomas Love Peacock, English satirical novelist (born 1785)
- February 2 – François-Xavier Garneau, French Canadian historian and civil servant (born 1809)
- March 6 – William Whewell, English polymath and cleric (born 1794)
- March 29 – John Keble, English poet and cleric (born 1792)
- May 5 – John Critchley Prince, English poet (born 1808)
- June 16 – Joseph Méry, French satirist and librettist (born 1797)
- August 1 – Luigi Carlo Farini, Italian historian (born 1812)
- August 12 – Philip Stanhope Worsley, English poet and translator (born 1835)
- September 10 – Charles Maclaren, Scottish founding editor of The Scotsman (born 1782)
- September 14 – Léon Gozlan, French novelist and dramatist (born 1803)
- September 19 – Christian Hermann Weisse, German philosopher (born 1801)
- September 26 – Carl Jonas Love Almqvist, Swedish-born novelist (born 1793)
- October – Evan Bevan, Welsh writer of satirical verse (born 1803)
- December 20 – Ann Taylor, English poet and critic (born 1782)

== Awards ==
- Newdigate Prize – George Yeld
