= 1867 in literature =

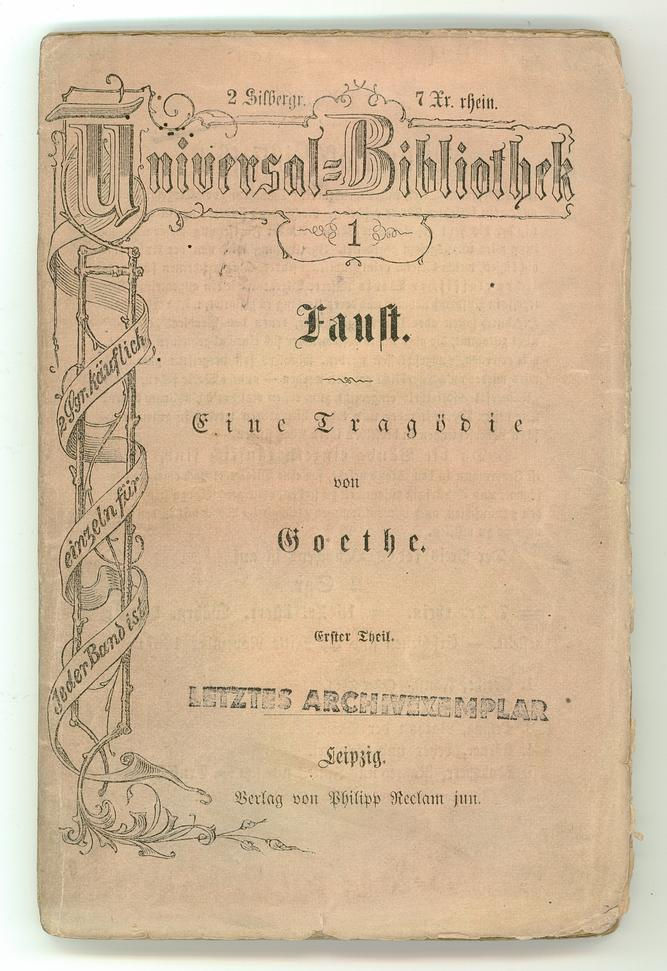
Faust I. Copy of the first edition of No. 1 of "Reclams Universal-Bibliothek" from the Stadtgeschichtliches Museum Leipzig

This article contains information about the literary events and publications of 1867.

== Events ==
- By February – The first blue plaque is erected in London by the Society of Arts on the birthplace (1788) of poet Lord Byron (later demolished).
- October 3 – Anthony Trollope resigns from a senior administrative position in the British General Post Office, to write full-time.
- November – The Leipzig publisher Reclam launches its Universal-Bibliothek series of cheap reprints with an edition of Goethe's Faust following the lifting of copyright restrictions in the new North German Confederation for authors dead for more than 30 years.
- December 2 – Charles Dickens begins a U.S. reading tour in New York City.
- December – After publication of Leo Tolstoy's 1805, an early version of War and Peace, concludes in The Russian Messenger, an advertisement appears for the revised complete novel.
- unknown dates
  - The première of Aleksey Konstantinovich Tolstoy's historical drama The Death of Ivan the Terrible (Russian: Смерть Иоанна Грозного, romanized: Smert Ioa′nna Gro′znogo, written in 1863 and first published in 1866) is held at the Alexandrinsky Theatre in Saint Petersburg, the first of a trilogy.
  - Mrs. Henry Wood purchases and begins editing the U.K. fiction magazine Argosy.
  - Three American periodicals for children – Oliver Optic's Magazine, Frank Leslie's Boys' and Girls' Weekly, and the Riverside Magazine for Young People – are launched.

== New books ==
=== Fiction ===
- William Harrison Ainsworth – Old Court
- Horatio Alger, Jr. – Ragged Dick; or, Street Life in New York with the Boot Blacks (serialization in Student and Schoolmate)
- Mary Elizabeth Braddon – Circe
- Rhoda Broughton
  - Cometh Up as a Flower
  - Not Wisely, But Too Well
- Thomas Bulfinch - Bulfinch's Mythology
- Charles Theodore Henri de Coster – The Legend of Thyl Ulenspiegel and Lamme Goedzak (La Légende et les aventures héroïques, joyeuses et glorieuses d'Ulenspiegel et de Lamme Goedzak au pays de Flandres et ailleurs)
- John William De Forest – Miss Ravenel's Conversion from Secession to Loyalty
- Anna Hanson Dorsey – Coaina: The Rose of the Algonquins
- Fyodor Dostoyevsky – The Gambler («Игрок», Igrok, novella)
- Augusta Jane Evans – St. Elmo
- Émile Gaboriau – The Mystery of Orcival (Le Crime d'Orcival)
- Goncourt brothers – Manette Salomon
- Jorge Isaacs – María, A South American Romance
- Ippolito Nievo – Le confessioni di un ottagenario (translated as The Castle of Fratta)
- Caroline Norton – Old Sir Douglas (serialization concluded)
- Ouida – Under Two Flags
- Anthony Trollope
  - The Last Chronicle of Barset (sixth of the Chronicles of Barsetshire; serial publication concludes July 6; book publication in 2 vols, March–July)
  - The Claverings (serial publication concludes in The Cornhill Magazine, May, and book publication)
  - Phineas Finn (second of the Palliser novels; serial publicatioin begins in Saint Paul's Magazine, October)
- Frances Eleanor Trollope – Mabel's Progress
- Ivan Turgenev – Smoke («Дым», Dym)
- Mark Twain – The Celebrated Jumping Frog of Calaveras County (collected short stories

=== Children and young people ===
- Ada Cambridge – Little Jenny
- George Manville Fenn – Hollowdell Grange
- G. A. Henty – A Search for a Secret
- Hesba Stretton – Jessica's First Prayer

=== Drama ===
- Erckmann-Chatrian – Le Juif Polonais
- W. S. Gilbert – Harlequin Cock Robin and Jenny Wren
- Henrik Ibsen – Peer Gynt (first published)
- Navalram Pandya – Bhatnu Bhopalu
- Thomas William Robertson – Caste

=== Poetry ===
- Matthew Arnold – New Poems, including "Dover Beach"
- William Morris – The Life and Death of Jason
- Jan Neruda – Knihy veršů (Books of Verses)
- Piet Paaltjens (François Haverschmidt) – Snikken en grimlachjes: poëzie uit den studententijd ("Sobs and Bitter Grins: poetry of student days")
- Henry Timrod – "Ode: Sung on the Occasion of Decorating the Graves of the Confederate Dead at Magnolia Cemetery, Charleston, S.C., 1867"

=== Non-fiction ===
- Walter Bagehot – The English Constitution (in book form)
- Augusta Theodosia Drane – Christian Schools and Scholars
- Edward Augustus Freeman – The History of the Norman Conquest of England (completed in six volumes in 1879)
- William Carew Hazlitt – Handbook to the Popular, Poetical and Dramatic Literature of Great Britain, from the Invention of Printing to the Restoration
- Francis Marrash – Rihlat Baris
- Karl Marx – Das Kapital
- Henry Maudsley – The Physiology and Pathology of Mind
- Marius Nygaard – Kortfattet Fremstilling af det norske Landsmaals Grammatik (Brief introduction to Norwegian Landsmål Grammar)
- William Makepeace Thackeray – The English Humorists of the Eighteenth Century: a series of lectures
- William Thomson – Treatise on Natural Philosophy

== Births ==
- January 6 – Robert Murray Gilchrist English author (died 1917)
- January 18 – Rubén Darío, Nicaraguan poet (died 1916)
- February 7 – Laura Ingalls Wilder, American novelist (died 1957)
- February 9 – Natsume Sōseki, Japanese novelist (died 1916)
- February 18 – Hedwig Courths-Mahler (Ernestine Friederike Elisabeth Mahler), German novelist (died 1950)
- February 27 – George Diamandy, Romanian journalist, dramatist and political figure (died 1917)
- April 5 – Frances Nimmo Greene, American novelist, short story writer, children's writer, playwright (died 1937)
- April 19 – Zinaida Vengerova, Russian literary critic and translator (died 1941)
- May 1 – Harry Leon Wilson, American author and playwright (died 1939)
- May 7 – Władysław Reymont, Polish novelist, Nobel laureate (died 1925)
- May 8 – Margarete Böhme, German novelist (died 1939)
- May 27 – Arnold Bennett, English novelist (died 1931)
- May 31 – Ieremia Cecan, Bessarabian journalist and Christian polemicist (shot 1941)
- June 8 – Dagny Juel, Norwegian writer (murdered 1901)
- June 28 – Luigi Pirandello, Italian dramatist, novelist, poet, and short story writer, Nobel laureate (died 1936)
- August 9 – H. E. Marshall, Scottish history writer for children (died 1941)
- August 23 – Marcel Schwob, French writer (died 1905)
- September 25 – Katharine Glasier (born Katharine Conway), English writer and socialist (died 1950)
- October 2 – Timrava (Božena Slančíková), Slovak novelist, short story writer and playwright (died 1951)
- October 31 – David Graham Phillips, American journalist and novelist (died 1911)
- November 1 – Mulshankar Mulani, Gujarati playwright (died 1957)
- December 21 – Margaret Cameron, American novelist, humorist, playwright, non-fiction writer (died 1947).
- December 24 – Tevfik Fikret, Ottoman Turkish poet and journalist (died 1915)
- December 25 – Alfred Kempner, German-Jewish theatre critic (suicide 1948)

== Deaths ==
- February 5 – Henry Crabb Robinson, English man of letters and diarist (born 1775)
- April 12 – Robert Bell, British man of letters (born 1800)
- May 27 – Thomas Bulfinch, American collector of myths and legends (born 1796)
- July 31 – Catharine Sedgwick, American novelist (born 1789)
- August 8 – Sarah Austin, English editor and translator (born 1793)
- August 31 – Charles Baudelaire, French poet, critic and translator (stroke, born 1821)
- October 7 – Henry Timrod, American poet (tuberculosis, born 1829)
- October 29 – Frederick Chamier, English novelist and Royal Navy captain (born 1796)
- November 19 – Fitz-Greene Halleck, American poet (born 1790)
- unknown date – Charlotte Barton, Australian children's author (born 1797)

== Awards ==
- Newdigate Prize – Robert Campbell Moberly
