= W. H. Wills =

W. H. Wills may refer to:

- William Henry Wills (1810-1880), a journalist, newspaper editor and friend of Charles Dickens
- William Henry Wills (1882 – 1946), a politician in the U.S. state of Vermont
- William Henry Wills, 1st Baron Winterstoke (1830 – 1911), British businessman and peer
- Wirt Henry Wills, an American Southwest archaeologist and a retired Virginia Tech Emeritus Professor of anthropology at the University of New Mexico
