= Mugby Junction =

1866 set of short stories by multiple authors

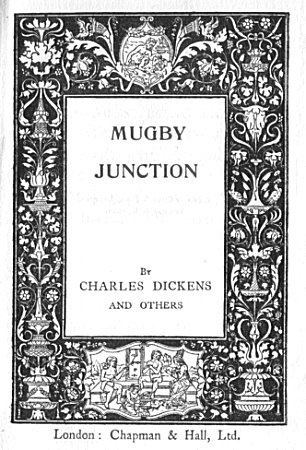
- Cover, first edition
- Author: Charles Dickens
- Language: English
- Published: December 1866
- Publisher: Chapman & Hall
- Publication place: United Kingdom
- Media type: Print

Mugby Junction is a set of railway-themed short stories written in 1866 by Charles Dickens and collaborators Charles Allston Collins, Amelia B. Edwards, Andrew Halliday, and Hesba Stretton. It was first published as a Christmas edition of the magazine All the Year Round. Dickens penned a majority of the volume, including the frame narrative in which "the Gentleman for Nowhere," who has spent his life cloistered in the firm Barbox Brothers & Co., makes use of his new-found freedom in retirement to explore the rail lines that connect with the (fictional) Mugby Junction. Dickens's collaborators each contributed an individual story to the collection.

== Overview ==
Mugby Junction includes the famous ghost story "The Signal-Man" concerning a spectre seen beside a tunnel entrance. The signal-man of the title tells the narrator of a ghost that has been haunting him. Each spectral appearance precedes, and is a harbinger of, a tragic event on the railway on which the signalman works. The signal-man's work is at a signal box in a deep cutting near a tunnel entrance on a lonely stretch of the line, and he controls the movements of passing trains. When there is danger, his fellow signal-men alert him via telegraph and alarms. Three times, he receives phantom warnings of danger when his bell rings in a fashion that only he can hear. Each warning is followed by the appearance of the spectre, and then by a terrible accident. The first accident involves a terrible collision between two trains in the tunnel. Dickens may have based this incident on the Clayton Tunnel rail crash that occurred in 1861, five years before he wrote the story. Readers in 1866 would have been familiar with this major disaster. The second warning involves the mysterious death of a young woman on a passing train. The final warning is a premonition of the signal-man's own death.

Another story features, in a thinly disguised form, the town of Rugby, Warwickshire and Rugby railway station. This was inspired by an incident in April 1866, when Charles Dickens was travelling from London to Liverpool. Dickens's train made an unscheduled stop at Rugby due to one of the carriages catching fire. While waiting for his journey to resume, he went into the refreshment room for a cup of coffee, and the proprietress, clearly not recognising the celebrity author, treated him rudely. Inspired by this, in the story "Main Line: The Boy at Mugby" he made a scathing attack on railway refreshment rooms and their staff.

== List of stories ==
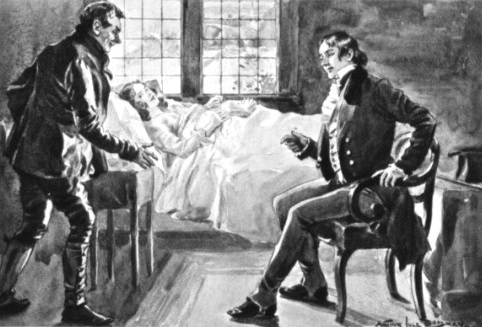
The frontispiece for Mugby Junction, featuring the characters of Mr. Lamps (left), Phœbe (centre) and "the Gentleman for Nowhere" (right) in a scene from the story "Barbox Brothers".

Title	Author
Barbox Brothers	Charles Dickens
Barbox Brothers & Co	Charles Dickens
Main Line: The Boy at Mugby	Charles Dickens
No. 1 Branch Line: The Signal-Man	Charles Dickens
No. 2 Branch Line: The Engine Driver	Andrew Halliday
No. 3 Branch Line: The Compensation House	Charles Collins
No. 4 Branch Line: The Travelling Post-Office	Hesba Stretton
No. 5 Branch Line: The Engineer	Amelia B. Edwards
