= Signalman (disambiguation) =

Signalman is a person who historically gave signals using flags and light.

Signalman may also refer to:

- Signalman (rank), the military rank
- Signalman (rail), a railwayman who operates the points and signals in a railway signal box
- The Signal-Man, an 1866 short story by Charles Dickens
- The Signalman (film), a 1976 BBC television adaptation
- Signalman (comics), a villain in the Batman comics
- A ranger-like ally in Gekisou Sentai Carranger
