= All the Year Round =

Magazine edited by Charles Dickens

All The Year Round
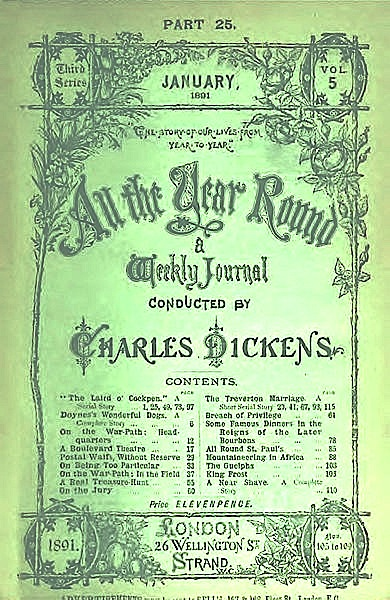
- Cover of third series, January 1891 issue
- Author: Editor: Charles Dickens
- Original title: All The Year Round, A Weekly Journal conducted by Charles Dickens
- Language: English
- Series: Weekly: 1859–1895
- Genre: Magazine, Social criticism
- Publisher: Chapman & Hall
- Publication date: 1859
- Publication place: England
- Media type: Print (Serial)
- Preceded by: Household Words
- Followed by: Household Words, new series

All the Year Round was a British weekly literary magazine founded and owned by Charles Dickens, published between 1859 and 1895 throughout the United Kingdom. Edited by Dickens, it was the direct successor to his previous publication Household Words, abandoned due to differences with his former publisher.

It hosted the serialisation of many prominent novels, including Dickens's own A Tale of Two Cities. After Dickens's death in 1870, it was owned and edited by his eldest son Charles Dickens Jr., and a quarter-share was owned by the editor and journalist William Henry Wills.

== History ==
=== 1859–1870 ===
In 1859, Charles Dickens was the editor of his magazine Household Words, published by Bradbury and Evans; their refusal to publish Dickens' defensive "personal statement" on his divorce in their other publication, Punch, led Dickens to create a new weekly magazine that he would own and control entirely.

In 1859, Dickens founded All the Year Round, taking William Henry Wills with him from Household Words as part-owner and sub-editor. As with his previous magazine, the author searched for a title that could be derived from a Shakespearean quotation. He found it on 28 January 1859 (in Othello, act one, scene three, lines 128–129), to be displayed before the title:

'The story of our lives, from year to year.' – Shakespeare.

ALL THE YEAR ROUND.

A weekly journal.

Conducted by Charles Dickens.

The new weekly magazine had its debut issue on Saturday 30 April 1859, featuring the first instalment of Dickens's A Tale of Two Cities. The launch was an immediate success.

So well has All the Year Round gone that it was yesterday able to repay me, with five per cent. interest, all the money I advanced for its establishment (paper, print etc. all paid, down to the last number), and yet to leave a good £500 balance at the banker's!

— Charles Dickens

One month after the launch, Dickens won a lawsuit in the Court of Chancery against his former publisher Bradbury and Evans, giving him back the trade name of his previous journal. On Saturday 28 May 1859, five weeks after the launch of All the Year Round, Dickens terminated Household Words, publishing its last issue with a prospectus for his new journal and the announcement that, "After the appearance of the present concluding Number of Household Words, this publication will merge into the new weekly publication, All the Year Round, and the title, Household Words, will form a part of the title-page of All the Year Round." AYR's full title then acquired a fourth item: "All the Year Round. A Weekly Journal. Conducted by Charles Dickens. With Which Is Incorporated Household Words."

All the Year Round contained the same mixture of fiction and non-fiction as Household Words but with a greater emphasis on literary matters and less on journalism. Nearly 11 per cent of the non-fiction articles in All the Year Round dealt with some aspect of international affairs or cultures, discounting the American Civil War, which Dickens instructed his staff to avoid unless they had specifically cleared a topic with him first. Old tales of crime (especially with a French or Italian setting), new developments in science (including the theories of Charles Darwin), lives and struggles of inventors, tales of exploration and adventure in distant parts, and examples of self-help among humble folk, are among the topics which found a ready welcome from Dickens.

After 1863, although Dickens continued to micromanage the editorial department, scrupulously revising copy, his own contributions fell off considerably, largely because he spent more and more time on the road with his public readings. He serialised the novels Aunt Margaret's Trouble (1866) and Mabel's Progress (1867) by Frances Eleanor Trollope in the magazine. She was the sister of his secret lover Ellen Ternan.

A few weeks before 28 November 1868, Dickens announced a new series for All the Year Round: "I beg to announce to the readers of this Journal, that on the completion of the Twentieth Volume on the Twenty-eighth of November, in the present year, I shall commence an entirely New Series of All the Year Round. The change is not only due to the convenience of the public (with which a set of such books, extending beyond twenty large volumes, would be quite incompatible), but is also resolved upon for the purpose of effecting some desirable improvements in respect of type, paper, and size of page, which could not otherwise be made."

=== 1870–1895 ===
After hiring him as the subeditor of the magazine a year earlier, Dickens bequeathed All the Year Round to his eldest son Charles Dickens, Jr. ("Charles Dickens the younger" in the testament) one week before his death in June 1870. After Dickens's death, his son would own and edit the magazine from 25 June 1870 until the end of 1895 (or possibly just until 1888).

In 1889, the magazine started a "Third series". It is unclear how much Dickens Jr. was involved with the new series, but a number of stories were contributed by Mary Dickens.

In 1895, All the Year Round ended. It had its last issue on 30 March 1895, after three series.

== Series ==
Each volume was 26 numbers long, half a year (thus Vol. 1 was Nos 1 to 26, Vol. 2 was Nos 27 to 52, Vol. 3 was Nos 53 to 78, but the annuals and seasonal extras counted for additional numbers.)

1. "First Series": Vol. 1 (30 April 1859) to Vol. 20 (28 November 1868)
2. "New Series" : Vol. 1 (5 December 1868) to Vol. 43 (29 December 1888)
3. "Third Series": Vol. 1 (5 January 1889) to Vol. 13 (30 March 1895)

== Collaborative works ==
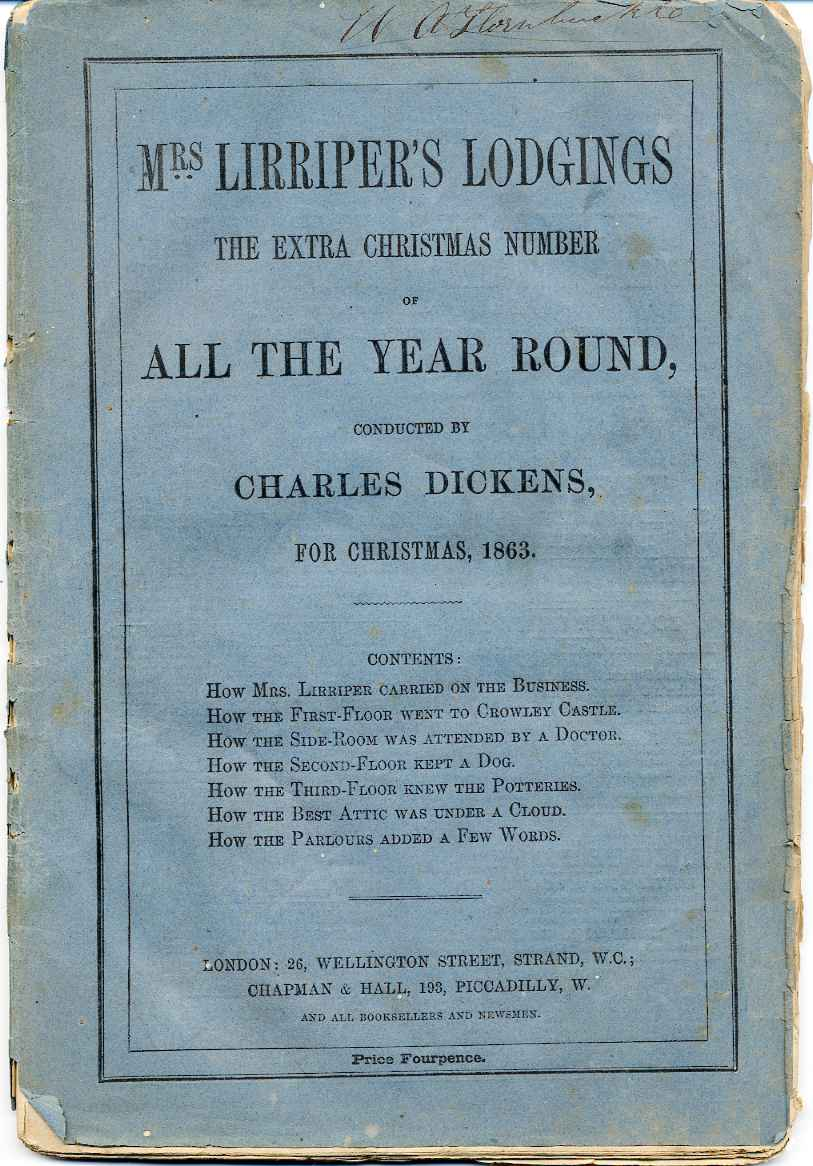
Cover of the Christmas issue for 'Mrs. Lirriper's Lodgings'

Dickens collaborated with other staff writers on a number of Christmas stories and plays for seasonal issues of the magazine, including:

- The Haunted House in the Extra Christmas Number (13 December 1859) with Wilkie Collins, Elizabeth Gaskell, Adelaide Anne Procter, George Augustus Henry Sala, and Hesba Stretton.
- A Message from the Sea in the Extra Christmas Number (13 December 1860) with Wilkie Collins, Henry F. Chorley, Charles Allston Collins, Amelia Edwards, and Harriet Parr.
- Tom Tiddler's Ground in the Extra Christmas Number (12 December 1861) with Wilkie Collins, John Harwood, Charles Collins, and Amelia Edwards.
- Somebody's Luggage (1862).
- Mrs. Lirriper's Lodgings in the Extra Christmas Number (12 December 1863) with Elizabeth Gaskell, Charles Lever, Amelia Edwards, Charles Allston Collins, & Edmund H. Yates.
- Mrs. Lirriper's Legacy in the Extra Christmas Number (1 December 1864) with Charles Allston Collins, Rosa Mulholland, Henry Spicer, Amelia Edwards, & Hesba Stretton.
- Doctor Marigold's Prescriptions in the Extra Christmas Number (12 December 1865). The most famous story in Doctor Marigold's Prescriptions is one of Dickens's own contributions, The Trial for Murder (aka To Be Taken with a Grain of Salt).
- Mugby Junction in the Extra Christmas Number (12 December 1866) which includes a masterpiece of short fiction, The Signal-Man (aka No. 1 Branch Line: The Signalman).
- No Thoroughfare in the Extra Christmas Number (12 December 1867) with Wilkie Collins.

== Contributors ==
A number of prominent authors and novels were serialised in All the Year Round, including:

- Charles Dickens
  - A Tale of Two Cities (June 1859 to December 1859)
  - Great Expectations (1 December 1860 to August 1861)
  - The Uncommercial Traveller (28 January 1860 to 13 October 1860, plus 1863–65 and 1868–69)
- Wilkie Collins
  - The Woman in White (29 November 1859 to 1860)
  - No Name (15 March 1862 to 17 January 1863)
  - The Moonstone (1868)
- Anthony Trollope
  - The Duke's Children (1879 to 1880)
- Edward Bulwer-Lytton
  - A Strange Story (10 August 1861 to 8 March 1862) then anonymous
- Elizabeth Cleghorn Gaskell
- Charles Lever
- Charles Reade
  - Very Hard Cash (28 March to 26 December 1863)
- Frances Trollope

Other contributors included:

- Sheridan Le Fanu – 6 short stories in 1870 (later collected in Madam Crowl's Ghost)
- Adelaide Anne Procter – poems (later collected in Legends and Lyrics)
- Hesba Stretton – children's literature
- Walter Goodman – humorous sketches
- George Augustus Sala – travel sketches from Constantinople, Rome and St Petersburg
- Sarah Doudney – poetry and fiction
- Mary Angela Dickens – fiction

Staff writers included:

- Henry Morley – informative though rather congested articles on historical, political, economic and literary topics, including the background to the American Civil War
- Charles Allston Collins (younger brother of Wilkie Collins and son-in-law to Dickens) – reportage and articles on art and architecture, marked by a distinctive vein of melancholy humour. He wrote as 'David Fudge' and 'Our Eye-Witness'
- Eliza Lynn Linton

Most articles were printed without naming their author; only the editor, "Conducted by Charles Dickens", was mentioned on the first page and the head of every other page. While a complete key to who wrote what and for how much in Household Words was compiled in 1973 by Anne Lohrli (using an analysis of the office account book maintained by Dickens's subeditor, W. H. Wills), unfortunately the account book for All the Year Round has not survived. Ella Ann Oppenlander has attempted to provide something comparable in a 1984 book not easily procured, but only manages to identify less than a third of the contributors: Dickens' All the Year Round: Descriptive Index and Contributor List. In July 2015 antiquarian bookseller and Dickens scholar Jeremy Parrott announced at a conference in Belgium that he had discovered Dickens's own annotated set of All the Year Round, naming all the contributors. A full guide to the magazine is now in progress and should be published in 2018.

Noted anonymous articles include:

- 1861 – "The Morrill Tariff", 28 December 1861 (cited in the Morrill Tariff article)
- 1871 – "Vampyres and Ghouls" (aka "Vampires and Ghouls"), 20 May 1871, pp. 597–600 (later collected in: Gilbert, William (2005). The Last Lords of Gardonal. Dead Letter Press)
