= Ada Nisbet =

American literary scholar (1907–1994)

- Born: May 7, 1907; Chicago, Illinois, U.S.
- Died: September 16, 1994 (aged 87); California, U.S.
- Occupation: Literary scholar
- Awards: Guggenheim Fellowship (1948, 1954)

Academic background
- Education: Dominican University of California; University of California, Los Angeles
- Thesis: Some letters of Thomas Hughes to James Russell Lowell: a chapter in Anglo-Americana (1947)

Academic work
- Sub-discipline: Dickens studies
- Institutions: Mount Saint Mary's University, Los Angeles; College of the Holy Names; University of California, Los Angeles

Ada Blanche Nisbet (May 7, 1907 – September 16, 1994) was an American literary scholar. A scholar of Dickens studies, she was author of Dickens and Ellen Ternan (1952) and co-editor of Dickens Centennial Essays (1972), as well as a two-time Guggenheim Fellow. She was a professor at University of California, Los Angeles, working at their English department for almost three decades.

== Biography ==
Ada Blanche Nisbet was born on May 7, 1907, in Chicago. Her parents were Bessie (née Kelley) and James Robert Nisbet, the latter of whom was a pharmacist. She obtained her BA from the Dominican University of California in 1929.

After working as an English instructor at Mount Saint Mary's University, Los Angeles from 1937 to 1939, Nisbet went to the University of California, Los Angeles, where she got her MA in 1939 and her PhD in 1946 or 1947; her doctoral dissertation was titled Some letters of Thomas Hughes to James Russell Lowell: a chapter in Anglo-Americana. She was a 1945-1946 American Association of University Women May Treat Morrison Fellow. She also worked at the College of the Holy Names as an English instructor (1939–1941).

Remaining at UCLA, Nisbet started working as an instructor in 1946. She was promoted to assistant professor in 1948, associate professor in 1954, and full professor of English in 1961. She became professor emeritus in 1970 and retired from UCLA in 1974. A member of the English department during her time at UCLA, she served as that department's vice-chair of graduate studies, as well as president of UCLA's Phi Beta Kappa chapter and Faculty Women's Association. She also worked for University of California Press as an editorial board member.

As an academic, Nisbet was interested in Dickens studies. In 1952, she published her first book Dickens and Ellen Ternan, focusing on Charles Dickens' relationship with actress Ellen Ternan. She later published Newman the Man (1960) and co-edited Dickens Centennial Essays (1972) with Blake Nevius. She also spent more than two decades working on British Comment on the United States: A Chronological Bibliography, 1832-1899; it was posthumously published in 2001, edited by Elliot J. Kanter. She was an associate editor for the journal Nineteenth-Century Fiction (1960–1974).

In 1948, Nisbet was awarded a Guggenheim Fellowship "for a study of the basic trends in the social and intellectual relations between England and America in the early Victorian period". She was awarded another Guggenheim Fellowship in 1954. She received a 1963 American Council of Learned Societies Fellowship for her work in Dickensian studies.

Nisbet was a Democrat. Blake Nevius, a close friend, recalled that she would drive an MG car down the Southern California freeways, and that "Dickens would have loved Ada".

Nisbet died on September 16, 1994, in California, (Note: Sources conflict on the exact city, namely whether it is Berkeley or Oakland.) aged 87. The University of California, Santa Cruz acquired her private collection of works and memorabilia related to Dickens and Victorian literature, calling it the Ada Nisbet Archive.

== Bibliography ==
- Dickens and Ellen Ternan (1952)
- Newman the Man (1960)
- (ed. with Blake Nevius) Dickens Centennial Essays (1972)
- (ed. by Elliot J. Kanter) British Comment on the United States: A Chronological Bibliography, 1832-1899 (2001)
