= Mabel's Progress =

1867 novel

- Author: Frances Eleanor Trollope
- Language: English
- Genre: Sensation novel
- Publisher: Chapman & Hall
- Publication date: 1867
- Publication place: United Kingdom
- Media type: Print

Mabel's Progress is an 1867 sensation novel by the British author Frances Eleanor Trollope. It was originally serialised in the magazine All the Year Round, edited by Charles Dickens. It was then published as a book in a three volumes by Chapman & Hall. It was her second novel, building on the success of her debut Aunt Margaret's Trouble. She received 500 guineas from Dickens for the rights to the novel, possibly a particularly generous sum as he wanted to encourage her silence regarding his relationship with her sister Nelly Ternan. When it subsequently appeared in the American magazine Harper's Magazine it was incorrectly described to by Dickens own daughter.

== Bibliography ==
- Delafield, Catherine. Serialization and the Novel in Mid-Victorian Magazines. Taylor & Francis, 2016.
- Morris, Emily & Scholl, Lesa (ed.) The Palgrave Encyclopedia of Victorian Women's Writing. Springer International Publishing, 2022.
- Tomalin, Claire. Charles Dickens: A Life. Penguin Books, 2012.
