= Cora Harrison =

Irish author

Cora Harrison is an Irish author. She writes critically acclaimed historical detective novels primarily based in Ireland, and has also written many books for children of all ages. Her mystery series include The Burren Mysteries set in 16th-century West Ireland; the Reverend Mother Mystery series set in the 1920s Cork during the Irish Civil War; the Gaslight series based on the real life friendship between Charles Dickens and Wilkie Collins, acting as amateur detectives in 19th century London; and many others.

== Early life ==
Harrison was born in Cobh, in County Cork. However, she grew up mostly in Cork, until she was 21. At the age of 7 she became sick, and had hardly visited school until she was 13. She had been bed-ridden for weeks at a time, and entertained herself by making up stories and drawing matching historical figures and clothes. She rarely wrote down these stories because of her bad hand writing and spelling.

She recovered at the age of 14 and returned to school. Her favorite subject was History, and yet, she chose to study German and French at University College Cork.

After she graduated, she moved to London, where she worked at the Linguaphone language school. She married Frank, bore two children, and moved to Kent, where she started teaching at a primary school as their children were growing up. She later became a Head teacher. She taught for 25 years.

== Career as an author ==
In the 1990s, the Harrisons retired to a cottage they bought in Kilfenora, in County Clare, which borders The Burren. The cottage had 20 acres of land, including a river and an Iron Age Fort. They planned on setting up an Autarky farm there, but failed.

Harrison has always liked mystery novels, but had never considered writing them herself. When she got infected with a Mrsa bacteria while visiting a hospital, she fell ill for months. She was weak and depressed, and suffered pains. Her son suggested that she write a book. This suggestion, combined with the fact that the nearby Cahermacnaghten ringfort used to host an Early Irish law school at the 16th century, lead to her first book, My Lady Judge.

Since then, she has written dozens of books, for various ages. Harrison also regularly visited Irish schools, giving readings from her books, with the purpose of encouraging children to write.

== Works ==
In the Burren mysteries, the heroine is Mara, a judge acting under the Brehon law. The first book takes place in 1509, in The Burren, County Clare, Ireland, in Henry VIII's first year reigning as King.

The Burren series, while a murder mystery series, is set against the background of Irish Brehon law. Harrison saw Brehon law as less violent, or more just: "very egalitarian". Punishment was mostly through fines. England's invasion of Ireland replaced the Brehon law, which was a community law, with the laws of the English king. By comparison to capital punishment of the English king's law, its most severe punishment, given for the murder of a family member, was to be put to sea and left to drift on the tide in a boat with no oars.

The proximity of the ancient Brehon law school to her cottage in Ireland captured Harrison's imagination. The first draft of the first book was written with a male hero judge, but following her agent's advice, she converted the hero to the heroine Mara. These books were published mostly by Severn House, though the first was sold to Macmillan Books and the second to Minotaur Books.

The Reverend Mother Mysteries series takes place in Cork during the Irish War of Independence in the 1920s. The heroine is a Catholic abbess. Asked 'Why did you choose a religious figure as the protagonist?', in an interview with Publishers Weekly, Harrison states that she: "chose a woman of power, and a very highly respected person in the city." She describes the background setting of the series: "Up to a decade or two previously, the Catholic church was subject to serious restrictions in Ireland, which were only completely lifted when Ireland attained complete freedom in the 1920s."

The result of this persecution was that "religious figures who had suffered, and even died for their faith, were held in very high esteem in the Ireland of the 1920s, and they had a very strong influence, especially amongst the working class."

Harrison adds, "The problem, I’ve always felt, with Agatha Christie’s Miss Marple lies in her credibility, in the respect which is accorded to her opinions. That would not have been the case with the Reverend Mother."

The Gaslight mysteries take place in 19th century London, with Charles Dickens and Wilkie Collins as the amateur detectives. The series has drawn interest from historians that study Charles Dickens because, as Helena Kelly notes in her speculative biography, Harrison supports the novel view that Ellen Ternan, widely thought to be Dickens’s mistress, is actually his illegitimate daughter.

In an interview with Crime Time, Harrison presents in detail the view that her third novel in the series, Summer of Secrets, is:

inspired by my interest, not just in Charles Dickens and his friends, but also in Ellen Ternan whose name is so connected with his. So, who was Ellen Ternan? A huge majority of the English-speaking population of the world would probably say that she was an actress who became Charles Dickens’ mistress, but I am convinced that she was not his mistress, but his daughter.

This theory is backed by Dickens scholar Brian Ruck.

The Jane Austen historical series, published by Pan Macmillan UK in 2010, is intended for girls.

The Debutante series takes place in London, 1920s.

In addition to writing adult novels, Harrison wrote many children's novels, the most important of which was the Drumshee chronicles and Drumshea Timeline series. She also wrote the London Mysteries, and the Wolfcub series. She also wrote single books: Gorgeous, Two mad dogs, The cardinal's court, and False accusations.
