= A Message from the Sea =

"A Message from the Sea" is a set of short stories by Charles Dickens, Wilkie Collins, Robert Buchanan, Charles Allston Collins, Amelia Edwards and Harriet Parr, written in 1860 for the Christmas issue of All the Year Round.

== Plot summary ==
Chapter 1 - The Village: The narrative begins with Captain Jorgan's arrival on Steepsteps, a British fishing village near Devon, seeking to deliver a letter he found in a bottle on a tropical island during his travels. The letter charged the finder to take it to Alfred Raybrock to read.

Chapter 2 - The Money: Captain Jorgan finds Alfred Raybrock, a young sailor living on the island with his family, and gives him the letter to read. It was written by his lost brother Hugh, believed lost at sea, and reveals a story of stolen money, appearing to have been stolen by their recently deceased father, a shocking revelation they keep secret from the women of the family. Hugh wants Alfred to clear their family's name by revealing the story of the money, perhaps known by the people in old Mr. Raybrock's hometown, Lanrean. Alfred was about to marry Kitty on the strength of the father's legacy, but he puts the wedding aside to investigate the vague accusations in the letter. Captain Jorgan insists on joining Alfred as he is young and less experienced in the ways of the world. They interview Alfred's fiance's father Mr. Tregarthen, also from Lanrean, to provide names of possible witnesses who may know of the story. They then leave for Lanrean.

Chapters 3-4: Once in Lanrean, Captain Jorgan and Alfred quickly come upon a King Arthur's Arms inn and tavern. Entering, they unintentionally interrupt a meeting of a private club of local storytellers. By happy coincidence, all of the men named by Mr. Tregarthen are present, so after each tells a colorful tale of ghosts and strange adventures, the Captain and Alfred ask them if they know anything about a story about a stolen 500 pounds; none claim knowledge. After all the storytelling, Captain Jorgan and Alfred stay over at the inn on the top floor near to one referred to as "the Seafaring Man" (already asleep). [Ed. note: These chapters feature unrelated picaresque stories written by Dickens collaborator Wilkie Collins, too complex to neatly summarize here.]

Chapter 5 - The Restitution In the morning, Captain Jorgan sets out to interview more of the village elders. When he returns to the inn, Alfred meets him standing with his lost brother, Hugh, the afore-mentioned Seafaring Man. Hugh recounts his difficult adventures and rescue to the Captain.

The ship that Hugh was serving on was wrecked upon a reef, and just five of its sailors survived to swim to the island. After much misfortune, only Hugh and fellow sailor Lawrence Clissold survived the immediate deprivations of the island. They are discovered and enslaved by pirates. Sick and dying, Clissold became delirious and raved a story about money and Mr. Raybrock, such that son Hugh thought he meant that Mr. Raybrock had been involved in stealing that amount with Clissold. He wrote the letter to his brother to investigate, but it in a bottle and tossed it into the sea, never expecting to survive and tell the tale himself. But he does and escapes servitude, and makes his way to Lanrean to investigate his father's case, where he accidentally (by more wondrous coincidence) meets his brother Alfred.

Now a trio, the Captain and the brothers go to meet their father's former lawyer in Barnstable not far from Lanrean. From him they learn that father had made a speculative loan of 500 pounds to one Lawrence Clissold, then a clerk at a London firm, and that only after much pressure Clissold repaid it with "money from a relative". They parted ways.

Armed with this information, the trio return to Steepsteps to question Mr. Tregarthen further. He recognizes the name of Clissold as being a fellow clerk in a London firm. While they were there, 500 pounds went missing from the bank deposit of the day - a deposit handled by Clissold. Because Tregarthen's ledger was missing the page with the entry of said 500 pounds, he was held responsible and made to pay the money to the firm. Unable to prove his innocence, Tregarthen left the firm in shame, and returned home to Lanrean.

The investigators decide that the missing ledger sheet must have been hidden in the furniture of the old firm. On the closing of the firm, the office furniture had been sold to the salvage firm of Captain Jorgan's steward, Tom Pettifer, when he was in such business with his brother. Tom recalls a desk and taking a paper from it. The Captain realizes that it was the missing page of the ledger, and where Tom put it. All is clear, and the Raybrock's pay the 500 pound legacy to Mr. Tregarthen as long-delayed compensation. He immediately settles it upon his daughter Kitty as a dowry, and the wedding is back on for the happy couple.
