= The Signal-Man =

1866 short story by Charles Dickens

- Short story by Charles Dickens
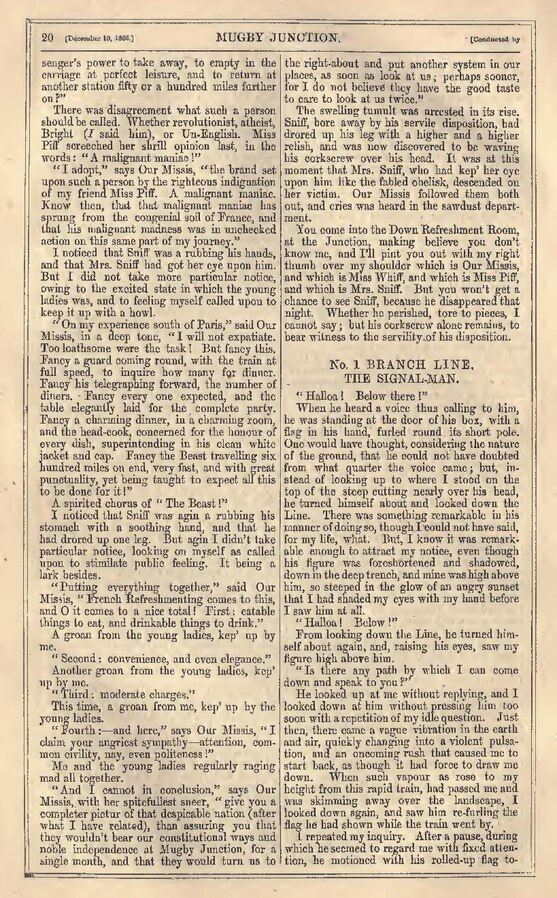
- The first page of "The Signal-Man" as it appeared in Mugby Junction

Text available at Wikisource
- Original title: No. 1 Branch Line. The Signal-Man.
- Country: United Kingdom
- Language: English
- Genre: Horror fiction

Publication
- Published in: Mugby Junction
- Publisher: Chapman & Hall
- Publication date: December 1866

"The Signal-Man" is a horror mystery story by Charles Dickens, first published as part of Mugby Junction, the 1866 Christmas edition of All the Year Round, as "No. 1 Branch Line. The Signal-Man." The story is told from a fictional first-person perspective.

The railway signal-man of the title tells the narrator of an apparition that has been haunting him. Each spectral appearance precedes a tragic event on the railway on which the signalman works. The signalman's work is at a signal-box in a deep cutting near a tunnel entrance on a lonely stretch of the railway line, and he controls the movements of passing trains. When there is danger, his fellow signalmen alert him by telegraph and alarms. Three times, he receives phantom warnings of danger when his bell rings in a fashion that only he can hear. Each warning is followed by the appearance of the spectre, and then by a terrible accident.

The first accident involves a terrible collision between two trains in the tunnel. Dickens may have based this incident on the Clayton Tunnel rail crash that occurred in 1861, five years before he wrote the story. Readers in 1866 would have been familiar with this major disaster. The second warning involves the mysterious death of a young woman on a passing train. The final warning is a premonition of the signalman's own death.

== Plot ==
The story begins with the narrator calling "Halloa! Below there!" into a railway cutting. The signalman standing on the railway below does not look up, as the narrator expects, but rather turns about and stares into the railway tunnel that is his responsibility to monitor. The narrator calls down again and asks permission to descend. The signalman seems reluctant.

The railway hole is a cold, gloomy, and lonely place. The signalman still seems to be in fear of the narrator, who tries to put him at ease. The signalman feels that he had seen the narrator before, but the narrator assures him that this is impossible. Reassured, the signalman welcomes the newcomer into his little cabin, and the two men speak of the signalman's work. The narrator describes that the signalman seems like a dutiful employee at all times, except when he twice looks at his signal bell when it is not ringing. There seems to be something troubling the signalman, but he will not speak of it. Before the narrator leaves, the signalman asks of him not to call for him when he's back on the top of the hill or when he sees him the following day.

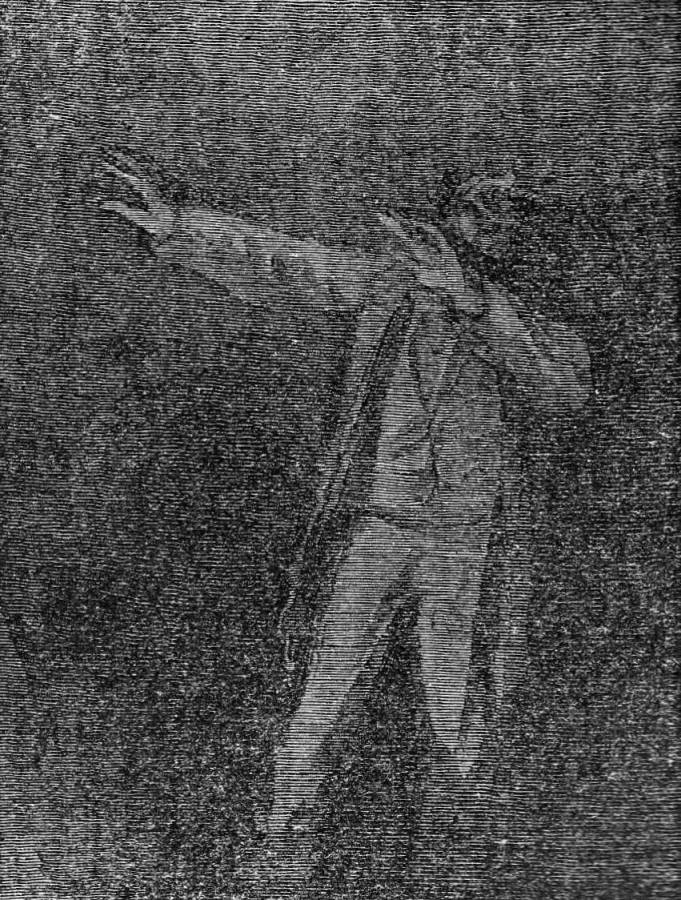
A wood engraving by Sol Eytinge Jr.

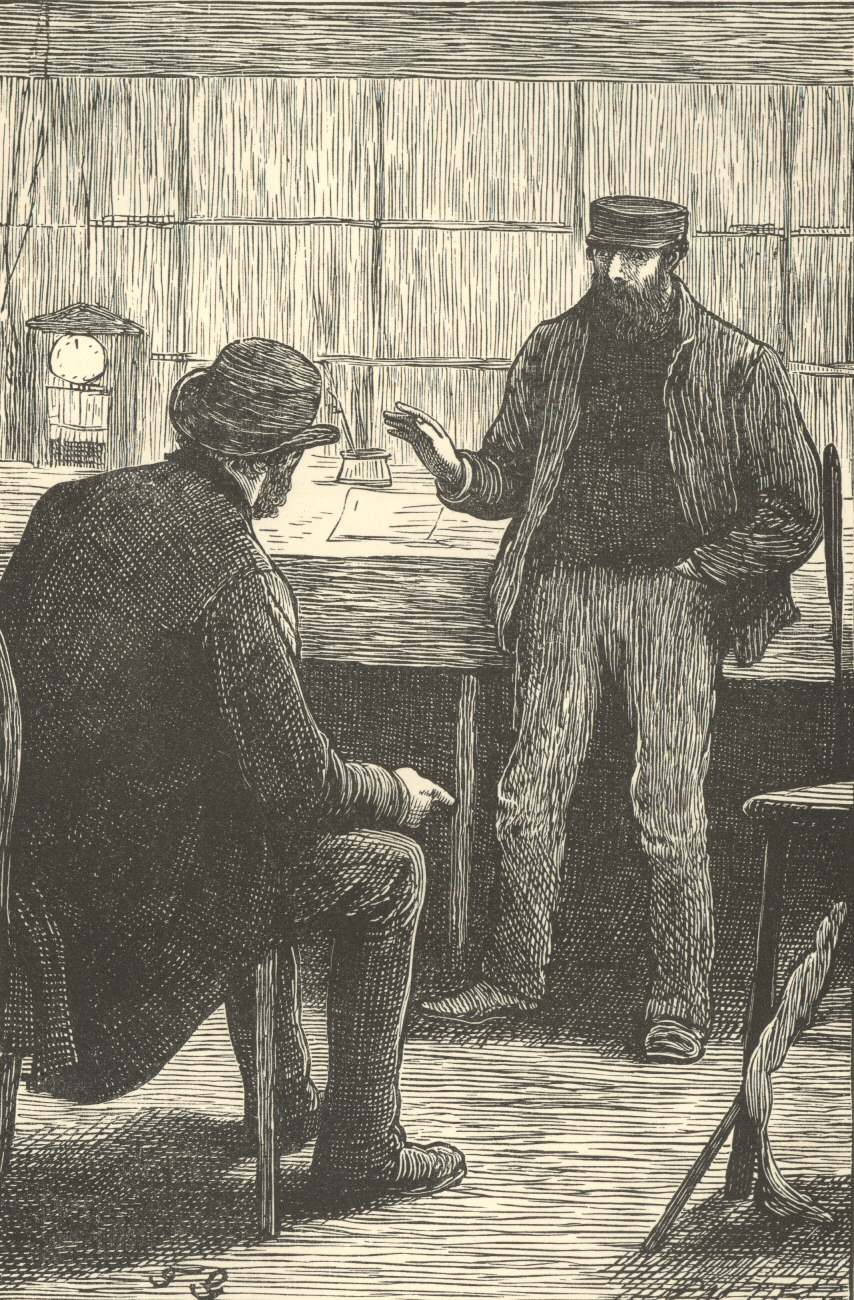
A illustration by an unknown author.

The next day, as directed by the signalman, the narrator returns and does not call. The signalman tells the narrator that he will reveal his troubles. He is haunted by a recurring spirit which he has seen at the entrance to the tunnel on separate occasions, and, with each appearance, there has followed a tragedy. In the first instance, the signalman heard the same words which the narrator said and saw a figure with its left arm across its face, while waving the other in desperate warning; he questioned it, but it vanished. He then ran into the tunnel, but found no-one; a few hours later, there was a terrible train crash with many casualties. During its second appearance, the figure was silent, with both hands before the face in an attitude of mourning; then, a beautiful young woman died in a train passing through. Finally, the signalman admits that he has seen the spectre several times during the past week.

The narrator is sceptical about the supernatural, and suggests that the signalman is suffering from hallucinations. During their conversation, the signalman witnesses a ghost and hears his bell ring eerily, but the narrator sees and hears nothing. The signalman is sure that these supernatural incidents are presaging a third tragic event waiting to happen, and is sick with fear and frustration: he does not understand why he should be burdened with knowledge of an incipient tragedy when he, a minor railway functionary, has neither the authority nor the ability to prevent it. The narrator believes that his new friend's imagination has been overtaxed and suggests taking him to see a doctor.

The next day, the narrator visits the railway cutting again and sees a mysterious figure at the mouth of the tunnel. This figure is not a ghost, however; it is a man, one of a group of officials investigating an incident on the line. The narrator discovers that the signalman is dead, having been struck by an oncoming train. He had been standing on the line, looking intently at something, and failed to get out of the way. The driver of the train explains that he attempted to warn the signalman of his danger: as the train bore down on the signalman the driver called out to him, "Below there! Look out! For God’s sake, clear the way!" Moreover, the driver waved his arm in warning even as he covered his face to avoid seeing the train strike the hapless signalman. The narrator notes the significance of the similarity between the driver's words and actions and those of the spectre as the signalman had earlier described them, but leaves the nature of that significance to the reader.

== Adaptations ==
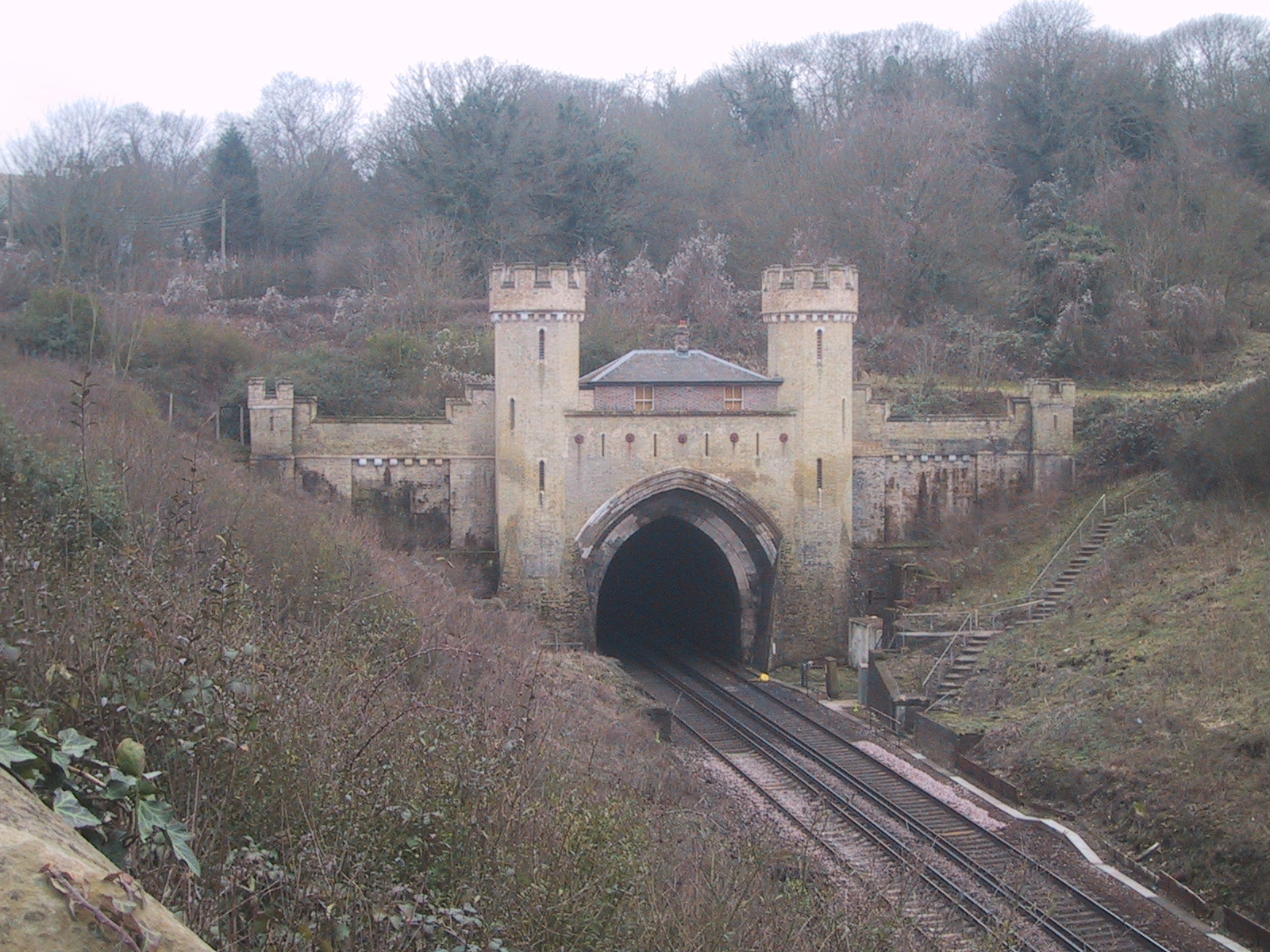
An 1861 train crash at the Clayton Tunnel entrance near Brighton in West Sussex (here seen from the north) may have inspired the story

The American television programme Suspense adapted "The Signal Man" in 1953, starring Boris Karloff and Alan Webb. The same story was also adapted in the radio format of the same franchise.

The story was adapted as The Signalman by Andrew Davies and broadcast as the BBC's Ghost Story for Christmas for 1976, with Denholm Elliott playing the principal character. This production was filmed on the Severn Valley Railway; a fake signal box was erected in the cutting on the Kidderminster side of Bewdley Tunnel, and the interiors were filmed in Highley signal box. The setting appears to have been moved forward in time from the 1860s to the 1900s, judging by the fashion and technology visible. At one point the Signal-Man whistles "Tit Willow", a song from the Gilbert and Sullivan operetta The Mikado (1885).

Elements of "The Signal-Man" are used in Andrew Lloyd Webber's 2004 musical The Woman in White (which is also based on the Wilkie Collins novel of the same name). Lloyd Webber had previously attempted to adapt the short story in 1979 as a double bill for his song-cycle Tell Me on a Sunday, but abandoned it, feeling the story's gloomy tones unsuitable to be paired with the upbeat Tell Me. The following year, Lloyd Webber again attempted to adapt "The Signal-Man" for the stage, offering it as an operatic work for English National Opera's 1980–81 season. However, the opera's board rejected the proposal, fearing that the story, having few characters, would leave most of the ensemble with nothing to do.

In 2014, the story was adapted, along with M.R. James' "'Oh, Whistle, and I'll Come to You, My Lad'", for the double bill Classic Ghosts by Middle Ground Theatre Company. The production toured the UK with Jack Shepherd as The Signalman. In 2015, the play was revived for a second tour, with Shepherd reprising his role as The Signalman and "Whistle" being replaced with an adaptation of Robert Aickman's "The Waiting Room". In 2025 Middle Ground Theatre Company created an extended adaptation of The Signalman.

In 2015, Brazilian filmmaker Daniel Augusto adapted the short story into a 15-minute short film starring Fernando Teixeira in the title role. The film was shown as part of the Short Cuts programme during the Toronto International Film Festival.

BBC Radio 4 broadcast a version on Christmas Day 2022 starring Samuel West and James Purefoy, written by Jonathan Holloway, and directed by Andy Jordan. In this adaptation, the narrator is explicitly Dickens himself, and he tells the signalman of his experience of the Staplehurst rail crash. The following year, Holloway adapted his version into a stage play for Creation Theatre Company. The play was staged as a site specific production at Wesley Memorial Church, Oxford, and starred Anna Tolputt as The Signalman and Nicholas Osmond as The Visitor.
