= William Henry Wills (journalist) =

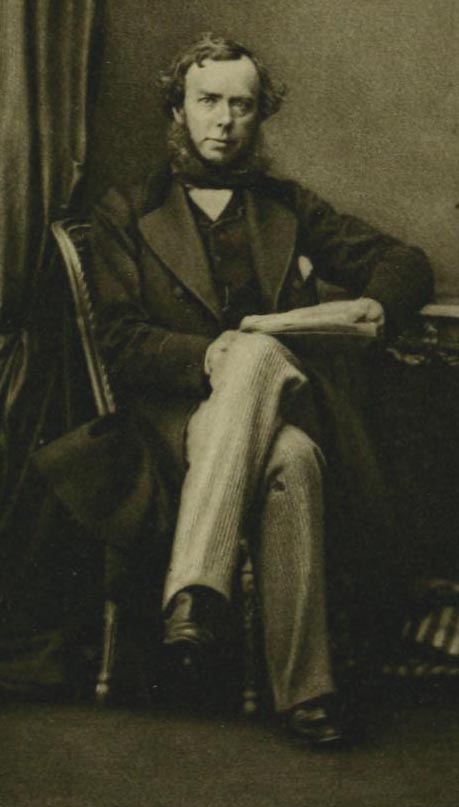
William Henry Wills in about 1862

William Henry Wills JP (13 January 1810 – 1 September 1880) was a British journalist, playwright, a newspaper editor and a close friend and confidant of the author Charles Dickens, who entrusted Wills with the task of forwarding his letters to his mistress Ellen Ternan.

== Early career ==
Born in Plymouth in 1810, his father, at one time a wealthy ship-owner and prize-agent, met with misfortunes, and the family moved to London in 1819. On the death of his father the responsibility of supporting his mother and brother and sister fell on William Henry, or Harry Wills as he was always called. After leaving school he became a wood-engraver in the office of J. H. Vizetelly before becoming a journalist, contributing to periodicals such as the Penny Magazine and Saturday Magazine, John Ramsay McCulloch's A Dictionary, Geographical, Statistical, and Historical before being appointed sub-editor of The Monthly Magazine. His play The Law of the Land was produced at the Surrey Theatre in 1837. In the same year he first met Charles Dickens who was then the editor of Bentley's Miscellany.

He was one of the original writers on Punch, and had some share in the composition of the draft prospectus. He contributed to the first number (17 July 1841) the satiric verse on Lord Cardigan called To the Blackballed of the United Service Club. He was for some time the regular drama critic, in which capacity he ridiculed Louis Antoine Jullien, the introducer of the promenade concerts at the Theatre Royal, Drury Lane, and severely criticised the acting of Charles Kean. Among his other contributions in prose and verse were Punch's Natural History of Courtship (illustrated by Sir John Gilbert), Punch's Comic Mythology, Information for the People, and skits such as The Burst Boiler and the Broken Heart, and The Uncles of England, in praise of pawnbrokers. From 1842 to 1845 Wills was in Edinburgh where he was assistant editor of Chambers's Edinburgh Journal; in April 1846 he married Janet Chambers (1812–1892), the youngest sister of William and Robert Chambers, the Edinburgh publishers for whom he had been working.

== Association with Dickens ==
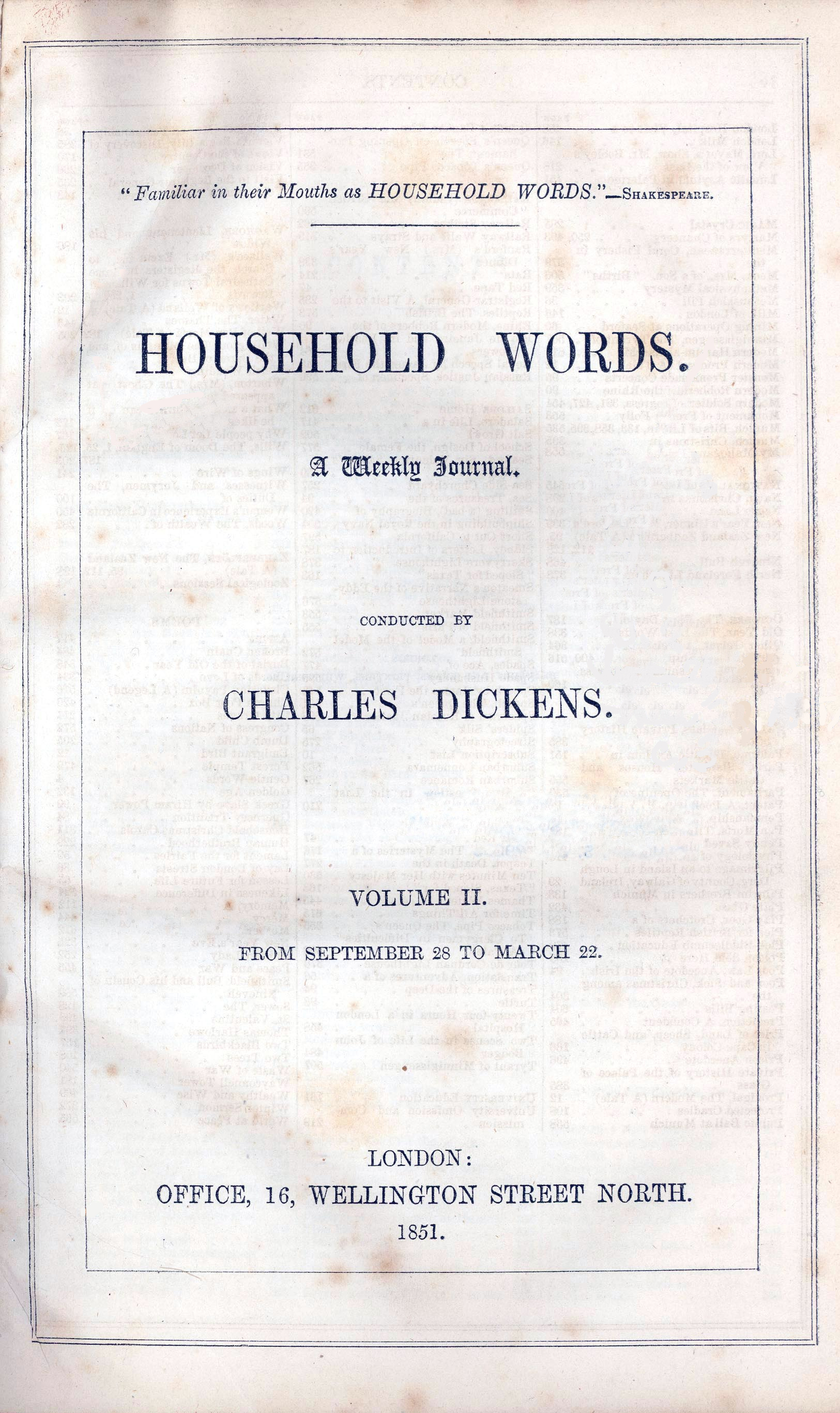
Front cover of Household Words from 1851

On his return to London he wrote for the Punch Almanack in 1846, but his contributions were thenceforth infrequent. Also in 1846 Harry Wills began his lifelong association with Charles Dickens, when he became one of the sub-editors of The Daily News under Dickens' editorship. He continued in this role when John Forster replaced Dickens as editor. In 1850, on Forster's suggestion, Wills joined Dickens as secretary, sub-editor and proprietor of the new journal Household Words, Wills holding an interest of one-eighth share, which was increased to three-sixteenths in 1856. He was given the same position by Dickens when, ten years later, All the Year Round was incorporated with it, but by now Wills had a quarter share.

His business capacity was invaluable to Dickens, and he was one of the most intimate friends of the novelist in later life. Despite this, Dickens accorded him no higher title than "subeditor". But as far as the reading public was concerned, Wills was as much a part of the two periodicals as was Dickens. Of Household Words (or at times of both Household Words and All the Year Round), he was variously referred to as "acting editor" (Wills' obituary in Athenaeum, 4 September 1880), "working editor" (John Hollingshead, My Lifetime, vol. I, p. 98), "assistant editor" (Lady Priestley, Story of a Lifetime, p. 95), "co-editor" (Athenaeum, 29 October 1892), and "editor" (W. J. Linton, Memories, p. 161). Dickens realised Wills's importance in making his periodicals a success. At various times he referred to Wills as his "fellow-workman", even as his "colleague" but also as his "factotum". However, Dickens was under few illusions regarding Wills's literary capabilities, on 15 May 1861 writing to Edward Bulwer Lytton, "Wills has no genius, and is, in literary matters, sufficiently commonplace to represent a very large proportion of our readers".

In 1850 Wills edited Sir Roger de Coverley by the Spectator, illustrated with engravings from designs by Frederick Taylor (Boston, Massachusetts, 1851; reissued in the Traveller's Library, 1856). At the end of 1851 Wills accompanied Dickens on his theatrical tour in connection with the Guild of Literature and Art, a philanthropic organisation founded by Dickens, Augustus Egg and Edward Bulwer Lytton, intended to provide welfare payments to struggling artists and writers who had fallen on hard times. Wills was honorary secretary of the Guild.

Wills also published Old Leaves Gathered from Household Words (1860), dedicated to Dickens. In 1861 he issued Poets' Wit and Humour, illustrated by a hundred engravings from drawings by Charles Bennett and G. H. Thomas. Two pieces, A Lyric for Lovers and an Ode to Big Ben, the latter of which originally appeared in Punch, were from his own pen. The book was republished in 1882. Wills also republished under the title Light and Dark some of his contributions to Chambers's Edinburgh Journal.

He was a fluent writer both in prose and verse, with a faint tinge of pedantry, which afforded Dickens much amusement. Douglas Jerrold was fond of exercising his wit at his expense, and Wills had enough humour to enjoy the situation. In 1855 Wills was asked to edit the Civil Service Gazette in addition to editing Household Words. Dickens refused him permission to hold these dual roles, but realising that Wills needed both positions because he was short of money suggested that he become part-time secretary to Baroness Burdett-Coutts who for many years had the advantage of Wills's judgement and experience in the conduct of her philanthropic undertakings.

Wills was a highly trusted friend to Dickens, who entrusted Wills with the task of forwarding his letters to Ellen Ternan during Dickens's 1867–8 American reading tour. In 1868, while Dickens was still in America, Wills suffered a concussion from an accident while hunting when he was thrown from his horse, and was disabled from his duties as editor of All the Year Round. He never recovered, and retired from active work. The remaining years of his life Wills spent at his home, Sherrards at Welwyn in Hertfordshire. In Welwyn he acted as magistrate and Chairman of the Board of guardians. He died there on 1 September 1880, and was buried on 6 September. In 1883 his widow Janet Hills left Welwyn and moved to London.

== Personal life ==
Wills married Janet Chambers (1812–1892), the youngest sister of William and Robert Chambers, the Edinburgh publishers. There were no children of the marriage. Janet Wills was a woman of strong character, and a great favourite with Dickens, in whose correspondence her name frequently appears and who wrote the part of Nurse Esther in The Frozen Deep (1857) for her; she played the role "to much acclaim", in one of Dickens's amateur theatricals held at Tavistock House.

She had an extensive knowledge of Scottish literature, and a large fund of anecdotes, and was for many years the centre of a wide literary and social circle. She died on 24 October 1892. At her death the sum of £1,000 accrued to the newspaper press fund, in which Wills had interested himself after the failure of the Guild of Literature and Art.
