= Aunt Margaret's Trouble =

1866 novel by Frances Eleanor Trollope

- 1880 edition of the novel
- Author: Frances Eleanor Trollope
- Language: English
- Genre: Domestic fiction
- Publisher: Chapman & Hall
- Publication date: 1866
- Publication place: United Kingdom
- Media type: Print

Aunt Margaret's Trouble is an 1866 novel by the British author Frances Eleanor Trollope. It was originally serialised in the magazine All the Year Round, edited by Charles Dickens. It was then released as a book in a single volume by the London publishing house Chapman & Hall. Frances was a former actress and the elder sister of Dickens' secret lover Ellen Ternan. She was paid out of Dickens' personal funds rather than the magazine's. The same year she married Thomas Adolphus Trollope and became the sister-in-law of Anthony Trollope. The couple lived in Florence for many years where she continued to write novels. Two further novels by her were serialised by Dickens in All the Year Round including her next Mabel's Progress.

== Bibliography ==
- Sutherland, Joan. The Stanford Companion to Victorian Fiction. Stanford University Press, 1989.
- Schlicke, Paul (ed.) The Oxford Companion to Charles Dickens. OUP Oxford, 2011.
- Tomalin, Claire. Charles Dickens: A Life. Penguin Books, 2012.
