= Frances Eleanor Jarman =

English actress (1802–1873)

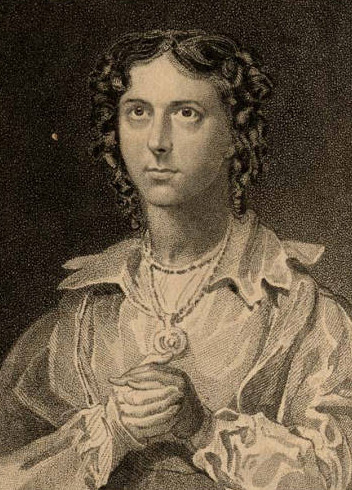
- Portrait of Frances Eleanor Jarman, 1827
- Born: 8 February 1802; Hull, Yorkshire, England
- Died: 30 October 1873 (aged 71); Oxford, England
- Other name: Frances Eleanor Ternan
- Spouse: Thomas Lawless Ternan
- Children: Ellen Ternan; Frances Eleanor Trollope; Maria Ternan

Frances Eleanor Jarman (8 February 1802 – 30 October 1873) was an English actress who performed in Ireland, Scotland, England, the United States and Canada. She is most known for her daughter Nelly Ternan's association with author Charles Dickens. Jarman's second daughter, also named Frances, was a novelist who married her fellow novelist Thomas Adolphus Trollope.

== Life ==
Jarman was born in Hull in 1802. Her mother, Martha Maria Mottershed, was a successful actress and after her marriage she continued to appear and from 1812 she appeared with her daughter. Her father, John Jarman, had been trained as a lawyer, but he worked in Tate Wilkinson's Yorkshire acting company as a prompter whilst his wife appeared in major roles as Maria Errington before her marriage even though her maiden name was Mottershed.

Jarman was almost immediately part of the cast and she appeared in one role before she was christened. She continued to be employed in juvenile roles.

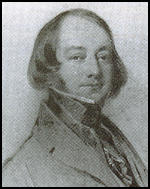
Thomas Lawless Ternan (1790–1846) husband and father to the Ternans

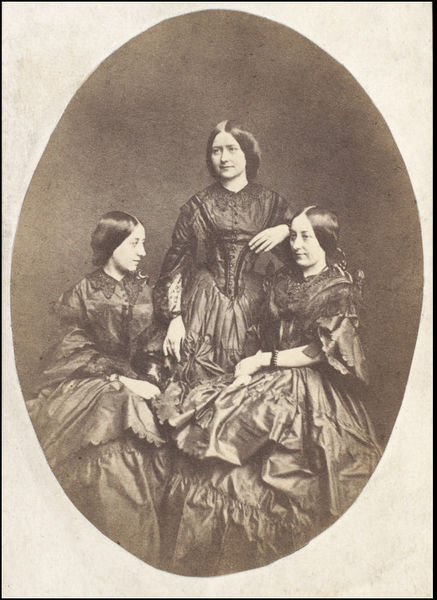
Her three daughters: Maria Ternan, Ellen Ternan and Frances Eleanor Trollope

Whilst she was appearing in Edinburgh she met an Irish actor named Thomas Lawless Ternan and they were married in 1834. They set off immediately on a long working honeymoon and in 1835 she was on a three-year tour of cities in Canada and the United States. There she gave birth to a daughter Frances Eleanor Ternan on board a paddle steamer in Delaware Bay. According to Tom Ternan the tour was a great success making £500 in two nights in Boston. The Ternans returned to Britain where she found work in major cities before appearing at Drury Lane in 1837 to 1838. If Frances' daughter, Ellen 'Nelly' Ternan was indeed the daughter of Charles Dickens, then their affair may have taken place while the Ternans were appearing on the London stage. The Ternans' daughters appeared as "Infant Phenomena" on the stage. Thomas Ternan became the manager of the Theatre Royal in Newcastle upon Tyne where his wife became the lead actress and all of his daughters acted on the stage. Thomas Ternan had a mental breakdown in 1844 and he lived for two years in an asylum in Bethnal Green before he died in 1846.

In 1865, whilst writing Our Mutual Friend, Charles Dickens was abroad with Frances and her daughter Ellen Ternan. Dickens' relationship with the Ternans was not public knowledge, though he travelled openly with them in first class. Dickens had booked three first-class tickets and they boarded the train for London. During the journey there was the Staplehurst rail crash when the train was derailed and some carriages ended up in the river and ten people were killed. Their carriage came close to falling, and remained in an unstable condition. Dickens was involved with rescuing several passengers including the Ternans. Dickens made substantial efforts not to give evidence at the following enquiry, keeping the identity of his travelling companions a secret. Dickens talks of this incident at the end of Our Mutual Friend, but again he fails to mention the full list of those with which he was traveling. An illicit relationship between her daughter Nelly and Dickens first gained public attention when an account, attributed to Dickens' eldest daughter Katey, appeared in a 1939 Dickens biography.

Jarman died in Oxford in October 1873. Her daughter Maria was an actress, her daughter Frances was a novelist and Ellen is mentioned above.
