= Nineteenth-Century Literature =

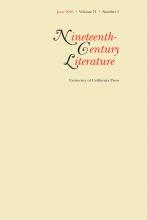
- Discipline: Literature
- Language: English
- Edited by: Jonathan H. Grossman, Saree Makdisi

Publication details
- Former name(s): The Trollopian, Nineteenth-Century Fiction
- History: 1945–present
- Publisher: University of California Press
- Frequency: Quarterly

Standard abbreviations
- ISO 4: Ninet.-Century Lit.

Indexing
- ISSN: 0891-9356 (print); 1067-8352 (web)
- LCCN: 87643024
- JSTOR: 08919356
- OCLC no.: 13799808

Links
- Journal homepage; Online access (3 year wall) at JSTOR

Nineteenth-Century Literature is a literary journal published by University of California Press. It publishes articles dealing with British and American literature of the 19th century. The journal was established in 1945 as The Trollopian, changing its name to Nineteenth-Century Fiction in 1949, before being renamed Nineteenth-Century Literature in 1985. It features articles that span across disciplines and explore related themes in the fields of gender studies, history, military studies, psychology, cultural studies, and urbanism. The journal is available online through JSTOR. The editors-in-chief are Michael C. Cohen, Jonathan H. Grossman (University of California, Los Angeles) and Saree Makdisi.
