= Wirt H. Wills =

Wirt Henry Wills is an American Southwest archaeologist and a professor of anthropology at the University of New Mexico. He has written papers and books on the archaeology of the prehistoric southwest. He is most known for investigations and excavations in or near New Mexico, including the prehistoric site at Bat Cave in Catron County, New Mexico, the Mogollon Su site in western New Mexico, and Pueblo Bonito located in Chaco Culture National Historical Park.

== Early life and education ==
Wills grew up in Virginia on his father's farm which contained many prehistoric and historic sites. He attributes growing up around old things as a probable stimulus for a desire to work in archeology. The first site he ever worked was in a salt marsh in Lewes, Delaware, at the age of 12.

Wills began teaching at the University of New Mexico in 1986, and his fieldwork has continued within the state of New Mexico.

Chaco Canyon is the center of Wills' work. For his dissertation, Wills wrote an article that was later published in the journal of field archaeology entitled The Preceramic to Ceramic Traditions in the Mongollon Highlands of Western New Mexico that focused on his excavation of a pit house on the SU site.

Excavations at Pueblo Bonito, Chaco Canyon's most famous site, is what sets him apart from most American anthropologists. Dated roughly from 919-1067 C.E., this vast structure consists of over 800 rooms that took 150 years to construct. The rooms served as living areas, religious centers and even storage units.

== Career and research ==
An essential part of Wills' economic theory separates a site's storage capacity and intensification. Wills' ecological interests focused on analyses of prehistoric subsistence, agriculture, and storage practices. Wills' work on the “Archaeology of Gender in the American Southwest” focused on both time allocation and economic intensification. His contributions to economic intensification were key to identifying some of the origins of southwestern ceramic containers.

Wills has been actively involved in the Chaco Stratigraphy project from 2006 to the present. The Chaco Stratigraphy Project is an interdisciplinary research program at the University of New Mexico involving field investigations in Chaco Canyon, New Mexico.

Wills has written and co-authored articles and books dealing with Southwestern Archaeology. The first book co-written by Wills was entitled “The Archaeological Correlates of Hunter-Gatherer Societies: Studies From the Ethnographic Record” in 1980. Wills has also written articles that have been published by the journal of field archaeology. In 2006, Wills wrote “The Late Archaic Across the Borderlands: From Foraging to Farming” which described the transition of foraging for food to the use of agriculture for food development.

== Selected publications ==
- (1980) Archaeological Correlates of Hunter-Gatherer Societies: Studies From the Ethnographic Record.
- (1994) The Ancient Southwestern Community: Models and Methods for the Study of Prehistoric Social Organization.
- (2006) The Late Archaic Across the Borderlands: From Foraging to Farming.
- (1988) Wills, W. H. (Wirt Henry) (1988). Early prehistoric agriculture in the American Southwest (1st ed.). Santa Fe, N.M.: School of American Research Press; [Seattle] : Distributed by University of Washington Press. pp. xii, 184 p. : ill., 27 cm. ISBN 0-933452-25-X. LCCN 88023591.

=== With others ===
- (1994) W.H. Wills and Robert D. Leonard., ed. (1994). The Ancient southwestern community : models and methods for the study of prehistoric social organization (1st ed.). Albuquerque: University of New Mexico Press. pp. xvi, 256 p. : ill., maps, 27 cm. ISBN 0-8263-1476-7. LCCN 93036796.
- Wills, Wirt H. And Crown, Patricia.
  - (1996) The Preceramic to Ceramic Traditions in the Mongollon Highlands of Western New Mexico
  - (1995) “The Archaeology of Gender in the American Southwest ” Journal of Anthropological Research, Vol. 51, No. 2.
