= Staplehurst rail crash =

Railway accident in Kent, England, in 1865

Coordinates: 51°10′9″N 0°34′49″E

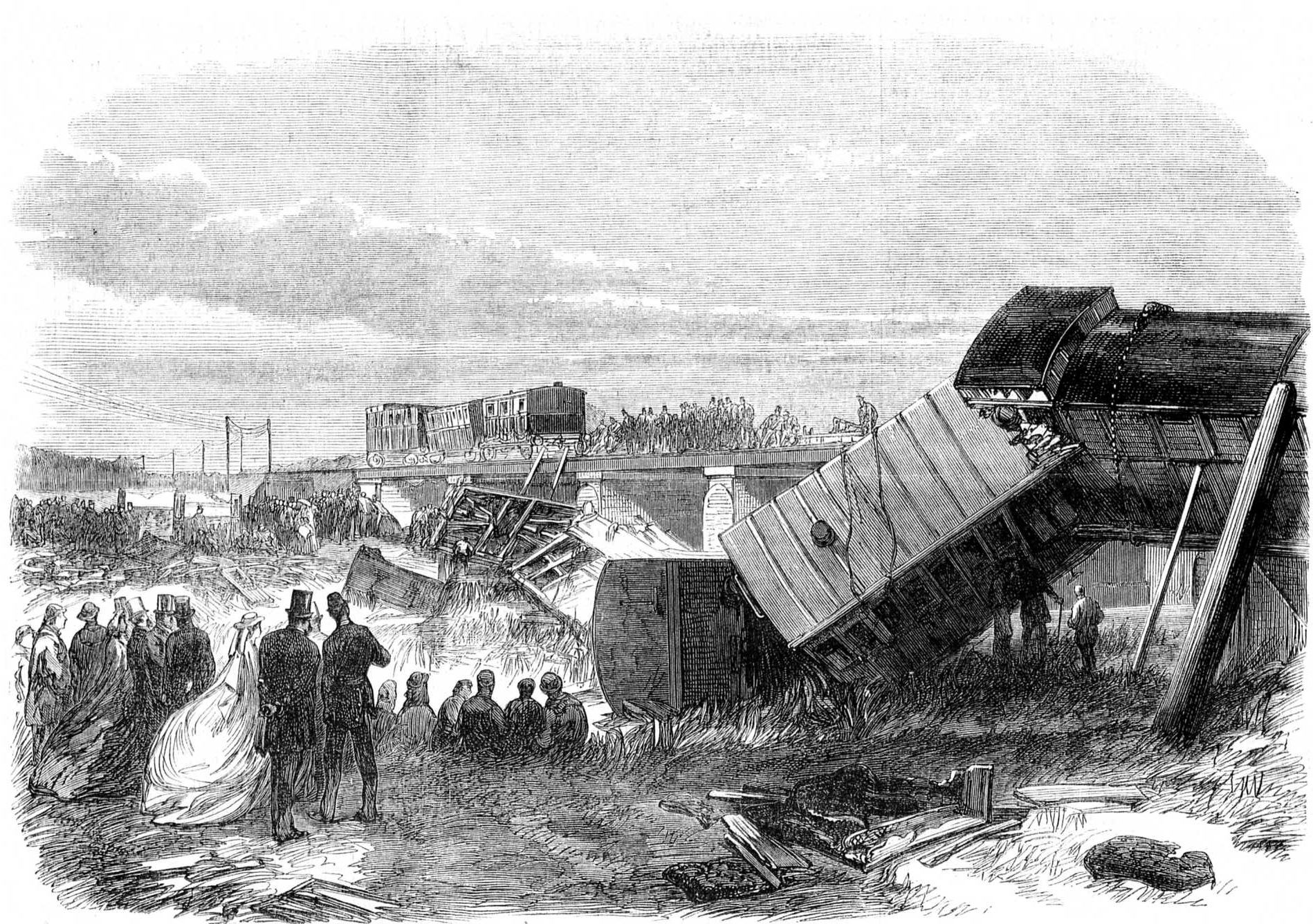

Details
- Date: 9 June 1865; 3:13 pm
- Location: Staplehurst, Kent
- Country: England
- Line: South Eastern Main Line
- Operator: South Eastern Railway
- Cause: Engineering possession error

Statistics
- Trains: 1
- Deaths: 10
- Injured: 40

The Staplehurst rail crash was a derailment at Staplehurst, Kent, on 9 June 1865 at 3:13 pm. The South Eastern Railway Folkestone to London boat train derailed while crossing a viaduct where a length of track had been removed during engineering works, killing ten passengers and injuring forty. In the Board of Trade report it was found that a man had been placed with a red flag 554 yards (507 m) away but the regulations required him to be 1,000 yards (910 m) away and the train had insufficient time to stop.

Charles Dickens, 53 years old at the time, was travelling with Ellen Ternan and her mother on the train; they all survived the derailment, with Dickens suffering significant psychiatric injury.

== Derailment ==
On 9 June 1865 the daily boat train to London left Folkestone between 2:36 pm and 2:39 pm, having taken on board passengers from the tidal cross-channel ferry from France. Tender locomotive No. 199 hauled the train comprising a brake van, a second-class carriage, seven first-class carriages, two second-class carriages and three brake vans, carrying a total of eighty first-class and thirty-five second-class passengers. Three of the brake vans were staffed with guards, with whom the driver was able to communicate using a whistle on the engine. Just after the train passed Headcorn railway station at 45–50 miles per hour (72–80 km/h), the driver saw a red flag. He whistled for the brakes and reversed his engine, but the locomotive and brakesmen only managed to slow the train to around 30 miles per hour (48 km/h) before it derailed at 3:13 pm crossing the Beult viaduct, where a length of track had been removed during engineering works.

The 10-foot (3.0 m) high viaduct, with eight openings each 21 feet (6.4 m) wide, crossed over a river bed, mostly dry at the time of the accident. The locomotive, tender, van and leading second-class carriage made it across and remained coupled to the first-class carriage, the other end of which rested in the dry river bed. The next seven carriages ended up likewise in the muddy river bed; the last second-class carriage remained coupled to the trailing vans, the last two of which remained on the eastern bank. There were ten fatalities and 40 people injured; seven carriages were destroyed, either in the derailment or during the rescue operation.

The Board of Trade report, published on 21 June 1865, found that for the previous eight to ten weeks a team of eight men and a foreman had been renewing the timbers under the track on viaducts between Headcorn and Staplehurst railway stations. The track would be removed when no train was due. However, on 9 June the foreman, John or Henry Benge, had misread his timetable as to the schedule that day of the tidal boat train, which ran at a different time depending on the tide in the English Channel. Regulations required a man with a red flag to be 1,000 yards (910 m) away, but the labourer was only 554 yards (507 m) away, having counted telegraph poles that were unusually close together, and the train had insufficient time to stop. There had also been no notification to the driver about the track repairs in the area.

Benge was subsequently tried for manslaughter.

== Witnesses ==
The accident had several witnesses. One described the derailment as "two terrible jolts and in an instant ... all became darkness ... and chaos". Another reported trapped bodies inside the wreckage, hearing "the groans of the dying and wounded, the shrieks of frantic ladies and the shrill cries of young children".

Charles Dickens was with Ellen Ternan, commonly believed to be his mistress, and her mother, Frances Ternan, in the first-class carriage which did not completely fall into the river bed and survived the derailment. He climbed out of the compartment through the window, rescued the Ternans and, with his flask of brandy and his hat full of water, tended to the victims, some of whom died while he was with them. Before he left with other survivors in an emergency train to London, he retrieved the manuscript of the episode of Our Mutual Friend that he was working on.

Although several passengers recognised Dickens, he did not make himself known to the South Eastern Railway, possibly because he did not want publicity about Ternan. The directors of the South Eastern Railway presented him with a piece of plate (i.e. a silver-plated trophy) as a token of their appreciation for his assistance in the aftermath of the accident. The experience affected Dickens greatly; he lost his voice for two weeks and was two and a half pages short for the sixteenth episode of Our Mutual Friend, published in August 1865. Dickens acknowledged the incident in the novel's postscript:

On Friday the Ninth of June in the present year, Mr and Mrs Boffin (in their manuscript dress of receiving Mr and Mrs Lammle at breakfast) were on the South-Eastern Railway with me, in a terribly destructive accident. When I had done what I could to help others, I climbed back into my carriage — nearly turned over a viaduct, and caught aslant upon the turn — to extricate the worthy couple. They were much soiled, but otherwise unhurt. [...] I remember with devout thankfulness that I can never be much nearer parting company with my readers for ever than I was then, until there shall be written against my life, the two words with which I have this day closed this book: — THE END.

Afterwards Dickens was nervous when travelling by train, using alternative means when available. He died five years to the day after the accident; his son said that "he had never fully recovered".
