= Theatre Royal, Newcastle =

Theatre in Newcastle upon Tyne, England

Theatre Royal
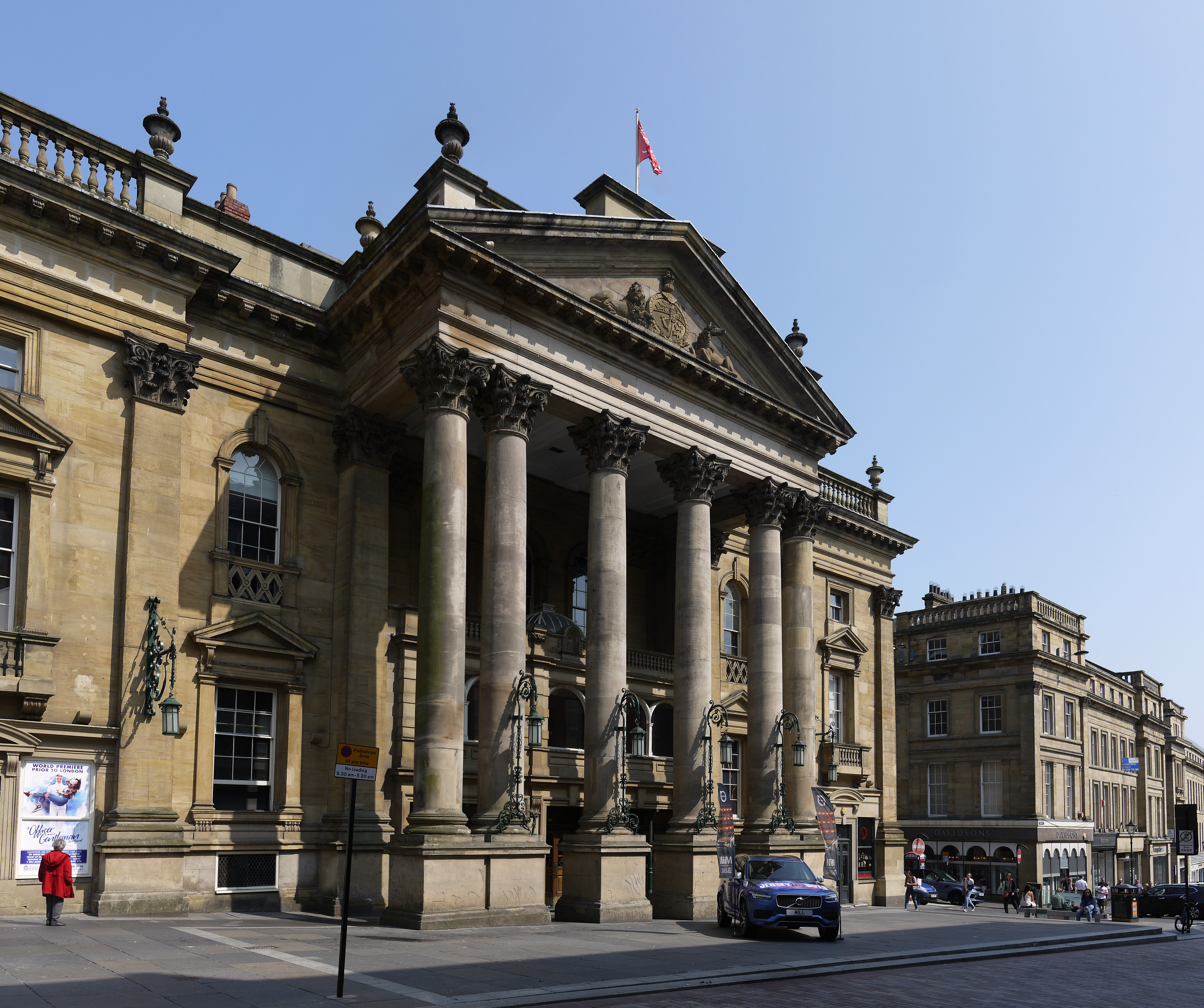
- Façade of the Theatre Royal
- Interactive map of Theatre Royal
- Address: Grey Street; Newcastle upon Tyne
- Coordinates: 54.97278°N 1.61194°W
- Owner: Theatre Royal Trust
- Capacity: 1,249 total seat capacity across four levels
- Type: Major regional theatre
- Designation: Grade I
- Production: Visiting productions

Construction
- Opened: 20 February 1837
- Rebuilt: 1901 Frank Matcham
- Architects: John and Benjamin Green

Listed Building – Grade I
- Official name: Theatre Royal
- Designated: 14 June 1954
- Reference no.: 1145840

Website
- http://www.theatreroyal.co.uk

The Theatre Royal is a historic theatre, a Grade I listed building situated on Grey Street in Newcastle upon Tyne.

== History ==
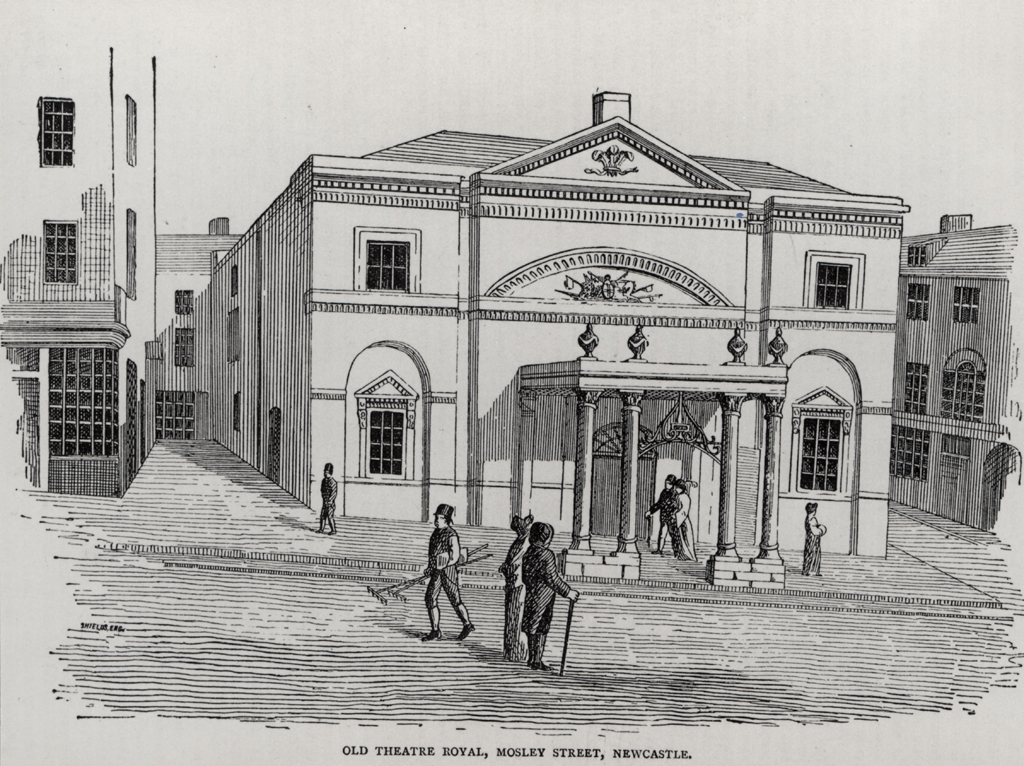
The original Theatre Royal c. 1827

George III authorised the founding of a theatre in Newcastle upon Tyne in the 1780s. Newcastle's original Theatre Royal opened on 21 January 1788. Its location on Mosley Street obstructed plans for the redevelopment of the city centre (as it was on the route of Grey Street), so it was demolished to make way for the present building. One of the theatre's most successful managers at this time was Stephen Kemble of the famous Kemble family, who managed the theatre from 1791 to 1806. The original theatre was demolished in 1834.

The current theatre was designed by local architects John and Benjamin Green as part of Richard Grainger's grand design for the centre of Newcastle, and was opened on 20 February 1837 with a performance of The Merchant of Venice. One of the first managers here was Thomas Ternan who employed his wife, Frances Ternan as the main actress.

The shareholders of the Proprietors' Committee appointed lessees to manage and programme the theatre. The longest running individual lessee, before Ltd companies, was Edward D. Davis from 1845 to 1870 during which in 1867 the interior was redesigned by architect Charles J. Phipps. William Glover and George Francis, both of the Theatre Royal, Glasgow took over from 1871 to 1878; to be followed by Charles Bernard of the Gaiety Theatre, Glasgow until 1882. James Howard and Fred Wyndham of Edinburgh and Glasgow became lessees from 1883 to 1887. Due to their intention, carried out, of also leasing the Tyne Theatre and Opera House, the shareholder committee did not renew their lease of the Royal.

Instead, Robert Arthur of Glasgow and now lessee of Her Majesty’s Theatre, Dundee took over in 1888.

Following a performance of William Shakespeare's play Macbeth in 1899, a huge fire destroyed the interior of the building in 1899. The interior was redesigned by Frank Matcham and reopened on 31 December 1901.

The venues of Robert Arthur Theatres Ltd in Scotland and England, which had many shareholders in Tyneside, prospered until losses overwhelmed the company in 1911. At this point the Arthur shareholders, led by the family of Joseph Cowen MP, appointed a new chairman of the lessee company, Michael Simons, of Glasgow, who in 1895 had created Howard & Wyndham Ltd.

From 1912 onwards the Theatre Royal Newcastle was an important part of the Howard & Wyndham group, led successfully by chairman Simons, followed by the Cruikshank family, whose King's Theatre, Edinburgh joined the group in 1928. Newcastle City Council took over ownership in 1967.

Newcastle, Glasgow and Edinburgh formed a triangle of industry, commerce and entertainment business from the 1870s onwards. From 1962 and increasingly from the 1970s the interchange of shows and pantomimes was joined by tours each year of Scottish Opera and of Scottish Ballet. Opera North joined in.

It underwent a major refurbishment and restoration in the latter part of the 1980s, reopening on 11 January 1988 with a performance of A Man For All Seasons starring Charlton Heston.

The Theatre Royal went dark on 14 March 2011 due to a major restoration of the auditorium, box office, bars and restaurant. The restoration restored the theatre to the original 1901 Frank Matcham Edwardian interior. The whole interior was stripped apart from the original plasterwork which was carefully preserved. The proscenium arch, tiers and boxes were gold leafed and the plasterwork restored. On all levels the seats were replaced with Edwardian-style theatre seats in keeping with the restoration. The amphitheatre which was removed during previous renovations was restored to offer more leg room and better views than the gallery. This took the theatre to five distinct seating areas, the stalls, grand circle, upper circle, amphitheatre and gallery. Wheelchair spaces were installed on levels which had previously been inaccessible. As well as the boxes near the stage, boxes at the rear of the grand and upper circles were also restored taking the total number of boxes up to ten. The stage lift and orchestra pit were replaced to offer better facilities for opera and musicals. A new ventilation system was put in place to improve comfort levels in the theatre. New frescos for the lobby and upper circle were commissioned and put in place. This £4.75m project introduced higher standards of comfort and improved energy. The Theatre Royal reopened on 12 September 2011 with Alan Bennett's epic period drama The Madness of George III.

== Description ==
The current theatre has a proscenium stage, and accommodates a variable orchestra pit on 2 lifts, which reduces the stall seating. The audience is seated on four levels: stalls (501), grand circle (252), upper circle (249) and gallery (247).

The theatre currently hosts a variety of shows, including ballet, contemporary dance, drama, musicals and opera. Almost all of the shows that come to the Theatre Royal are part of national British tours, and in a typical year the theatre will have 30 to 35 visiting shows. For the annual pantomime, and any visiting musicals and opera performances, there is a sizeable orchestra pit available which can seat 60 musicians if necessary. The stage itself is also of substantial size, and can house 50 singers, dancers, actors and musicians. The Royal Shakespeare Company have very strong ties to the theatre and are involved with the programme heavily in the second term.
