= Frances Eleanor Trollope =

English novelist (1835–1913)

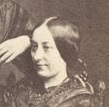
- Frances Eleanor Trollope - crop of a carte d visite, c. 1870
- Born: Frances Eleanor Ternan; 1 August 1835; Delaware Bay, United States
- Died: 14 August 1913 (aged 78); Southsea, England
- Occupation: Novelist
- Spouse: Thomas Adolphus Trollope (m. 1866; died 1892)
- Parent(s): Frances Eleanor Jarman; Thomas Lawless Ternan
- Relatives: Ellen Ternan (sister); Anthony Trollope (brother-in-law); Cecilia Tilley (sister-in-law); Frances Milton Trollope (mother-in-law)

Signature
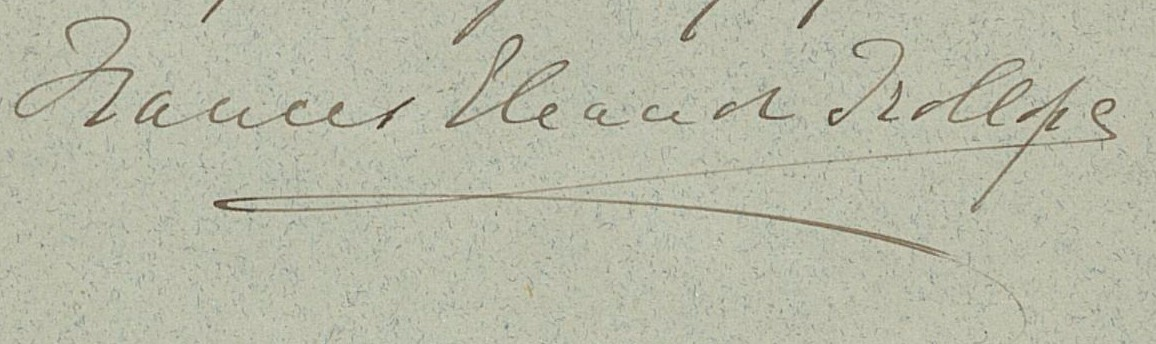

Frances Eleanor Trollope (née Ternan; 1 August 1835 – 14 August 1913) was an English novelist. She was best known for her biography of her mother-in-law, Frances Milton Trollope, who was famous for her book, Domestic Manners of the Americans, as well as her novels.

== Life ==
Ternan was born aboard a paddle steamer in Delaware Bay, the eldest of three surviving daughters of the actors Thomas Lawless Ternan and Frances Eleanor Ternan (née Jarman). Her mother and father were on a three-year tour of North America after their marriage in Edinburgh in 1835. Her father became the manager of the Theatre Royal in Newcastle upon Tyne where her mother was a leading actress. The three daughters including Frances were put on stage to show off their skills.

Her younger sister Ellen Ternan became the mistress of Charles Dickens and because of his intercession she was recommended as a prospective governess to the child of his widowed friend Thomas Trollope, following the death of his wife Theodosia Trollope. Ternan soon married Thomas Trollope despite an age difference of 25 years. The marriage took place within five months of her becoming a governess in Florence. She became his second wife. She also became the sister-in-law of Anthony Trollope and daughter-in-law of Frances Milton Trollope, whose biography, Frances Trollope: Her Life and Literary Work from George III to Victoria, she authored.

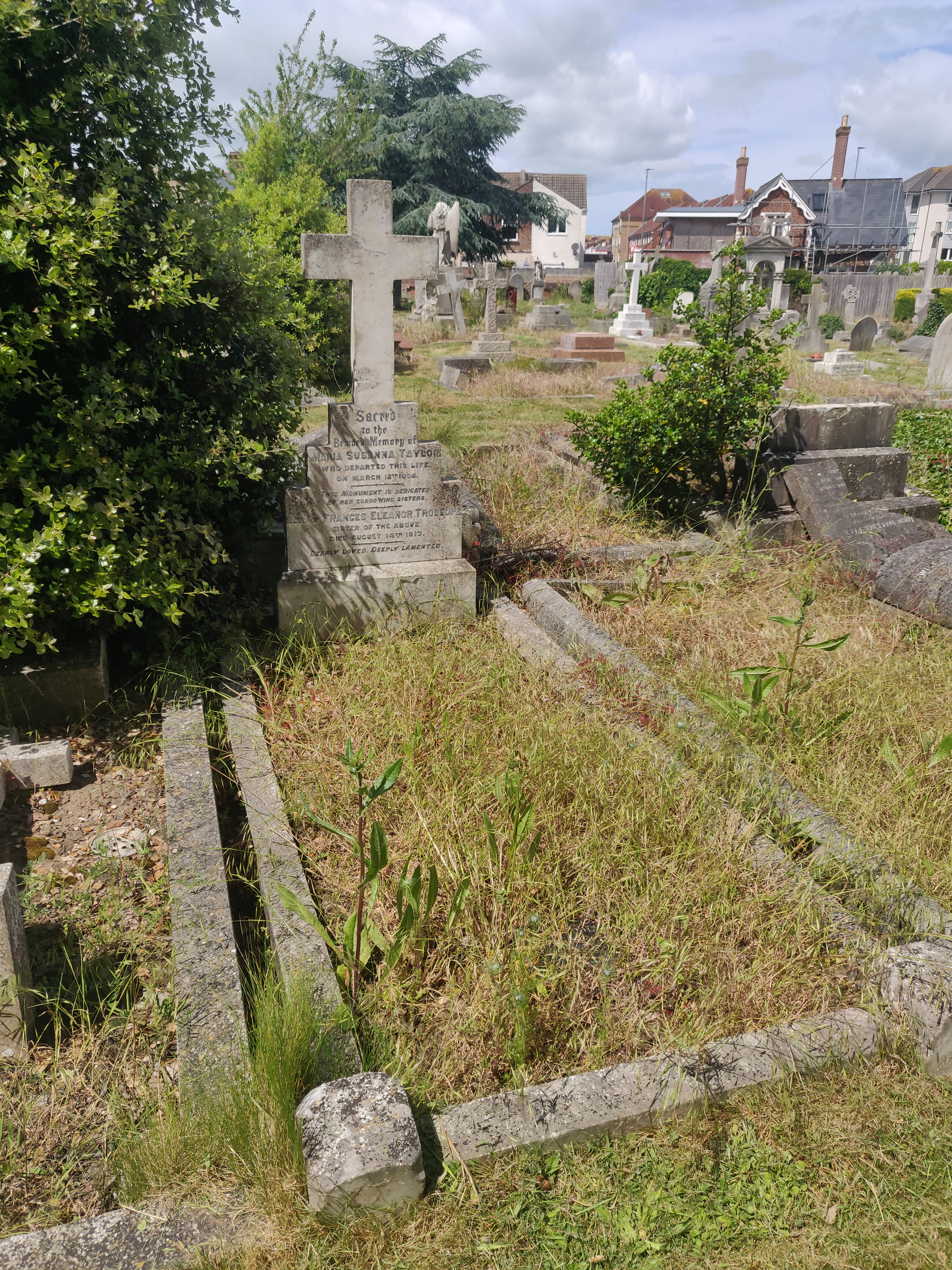
Grave of Frances and her sister Maria Susanna Taylor in Highland Road Cemetery, Southsea.

She and her husband lived in Italy from their marriage in 1866 until 1890, when they returned to England. Thomas died in 1892. Frances died 14 August 1913 at Southsea, where she had been living with her sister Ellen.

== Novels ==
- Aunt Margaret's Trouble (1866) (as by "A New Writer"; all Frances Eleanor Trollope's other books carried her own name)
- Mabel's Progress (1867)
- The Sacristan's Household (1869)
- Veronica (1870)
- Anne Furness (1871)
- A Charming Fellow (1876)
- Black Spirits and White (1877)
- Like Ships Upon the Sea (1883)
- That Unfortunate Marriage (1888)
- Among Aliens (1890)
- Madame Leroux (1890)
- That Wild Wheel (1892)
- The Fate of Fenella (co-written, 1892)
