= Charles James Collins =

English journalist and novelist

Charles James Collins (c. 1820 – 31 December 1864) was an English journalist and novelist.

== Life ==
Charles James Collins was a native of Worcester, but was connected with the London press for more than twenty years, having been on the parliamentary staff of The Sun, The Daily Telegraph, and the Evening Standard. He projected and edited the Racing Times, where he wrote under the pen name of "Priam." At one period, he was also an editor of the Comic News.

He married a widow, Phoebe Chopping, on 27 August 1841 at St Luke's Church, Chelsea and their only known child, Edward James Bruges Collins, was born in the second quarter of 1847 at Lambeth.

Collins was becoming increasingly well known for his novels when he died prematurely at his Brixton home on 31 December 1864. He was buried at West Norwood Cemetery on 7 January 1865.

== Works ==
He was the author of Kenilworth, a burlesque, and other dramas of a similar character; and of the following novels:

- The Life and Adventures of Dick Diminy, London [1854], reprinted under the title of Dick Diminy, or the Life and Adventures of a Jockey, London, 1855 [1875]
- Sackville Chase, 3 vols., London, 1863 and 1865
- Matilda the Dane, a Romance of the Affections, London, 1863
- Singed Moths, a City Romance, 3 vols., London, 1864
- The Man in Chains, 3 vols., London, 1864
