= Hesba Stretton =

English religious writer (1832–1911)

Sarah Smith
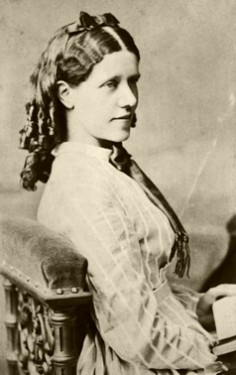
- Sarah Smith
- Born: 27 July 1832; Wellington, Shropshire, England
- Died: 8 October 1911 (aged 79); Ham, London, England
- Occupation: Writer (novelist)
- Writing career
- Pen name: Hesba Stretton
- Period: 19th century
- Genre: Children's literature

Hesba Stretton was the pseudonym of Sarah Smith (27 July 1832 – 8 October 1911), an evangelical English author of highly popular religious books for children. By the late 19th century Jessica's First Prayer had sold a million and a half copies – ten times more than Alice in Wonderland. She concocted "Hesba Stretton" from the initials of herself and four surviving siblings, along with the name of a Shropshire village she visited, All Stretton, where her sister Anne owned a house, Caradoc Lodge.

== Early life ==
Sarah Smith was the daughter of a bookseller, Benjamin Smith (1793–1878) of Wellington, Shropshire and his wife Anne Bakewell Smith (1798–1842), a noted Methodist. She and her elder sister attended the Old Hall, a school in the town, but were largely self-educated.

About 1867, Sarah Smith moved south to live at Snaresbrook and Loughton near Epping Forest, and at Ham, near Richmond, Surrey.

== Writing ==
Smith was one of the most popular Evangelical writers of the 19th century, who used her "Christian principles as a protest against specific social evils in her children's books." Her moral tales and semi-religious stories, chiefly for the young, were printed in huge numbers and often chosen as school and Sunday-school prizes. She became a regular contributor to Household Words and All the Year Round under Charles Dickens's editorship, after her sister had successfully submitted a story of hers without her knowledge. Altogether she wrote more than 40 novels.

The book that won widespread fame for "Hesba Stretton" was Jessica's First Prayer, first published in the journal Sunday at Home in 1866 and the following year in book form. By the end of the 19th century it had sold at least a million and a half copies. Critic Brian Alderson notes that its sales were "nearly ten times as many as those of Alice in Wonderland." The book gave rise to a genre of waif literature, stories about homeless children "that successfully combined elements of the sensational novel and the religious tract and helped introduce the image of the poor, urban child into the Victorian social conscious." It has been published in the United States as part of the Lamplighter Family Collection, under the title Jessica's Journey.

A sequel, Jessica's Mother, was published in Sunday at Home in 1866 and as a book in 1904. Jessica is a homeless girl in Victorian London, abandoned by an alcoholic actress mother, but who finds comfort and religious support in a friendship with Daniel Standring, owner of a coffee stall. She appears as a child actress, but when she becomes too big for such parts, she is beaten by her mother, receives little to eat, and wanders about London. The act of humanity by Standring, a chapel keeper in a Methodist chapel, helps him too, by re-evaluating his concept of religion and respectability. Other authors who followed the tradition of stories about "street arabs" and the importance of philanthropy to the poor include Georgina Castle Smith.

Smith became the chief writer for the Religious Tract Society. Her experience of working with slum children in Manchester in the 1860s gave her books a greater sense of authenticity, for they "drive home the abject state of the poor with almost brutal force."

== Social work ==
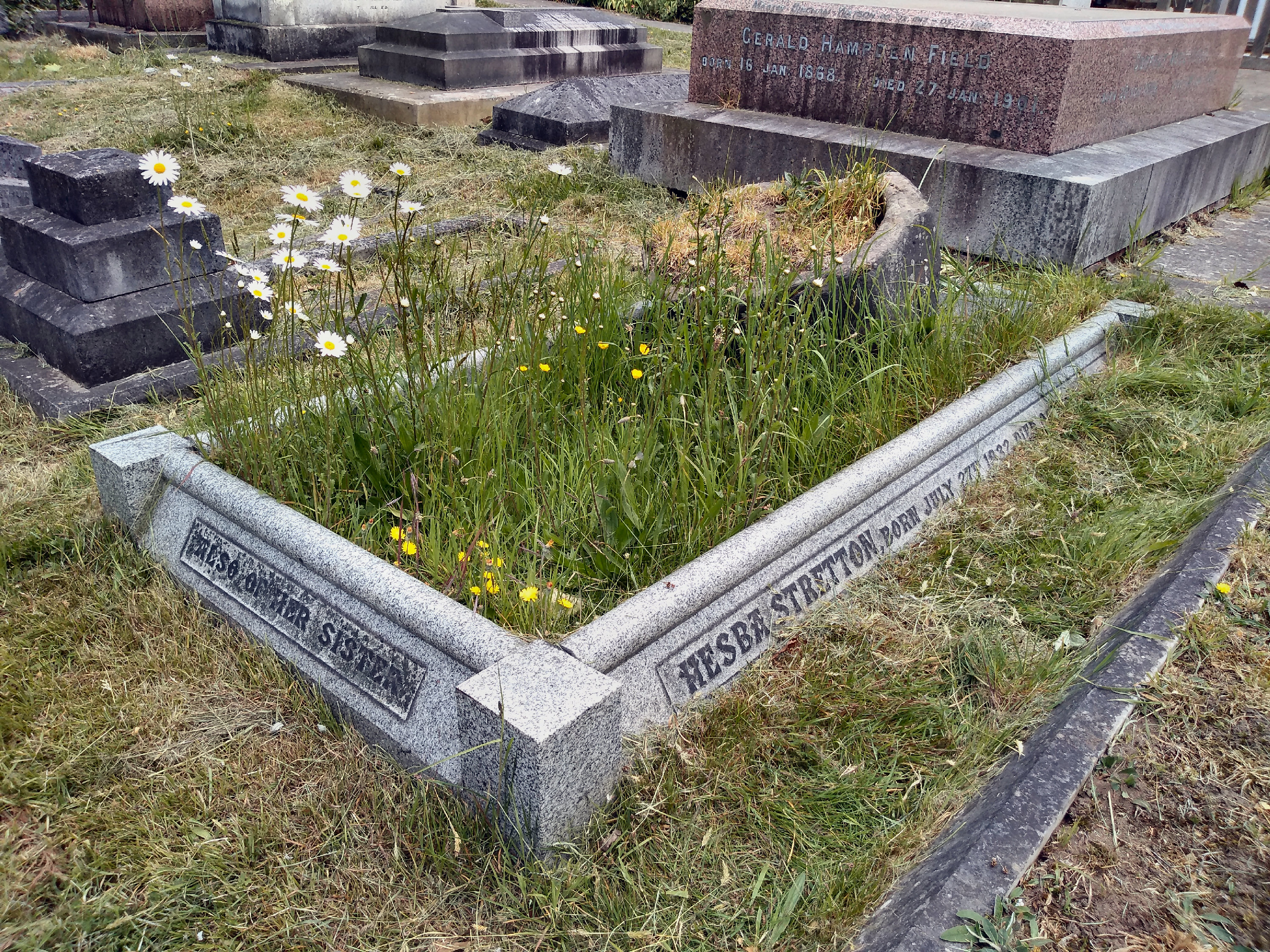
Grave at St Andrew's Church, Ham

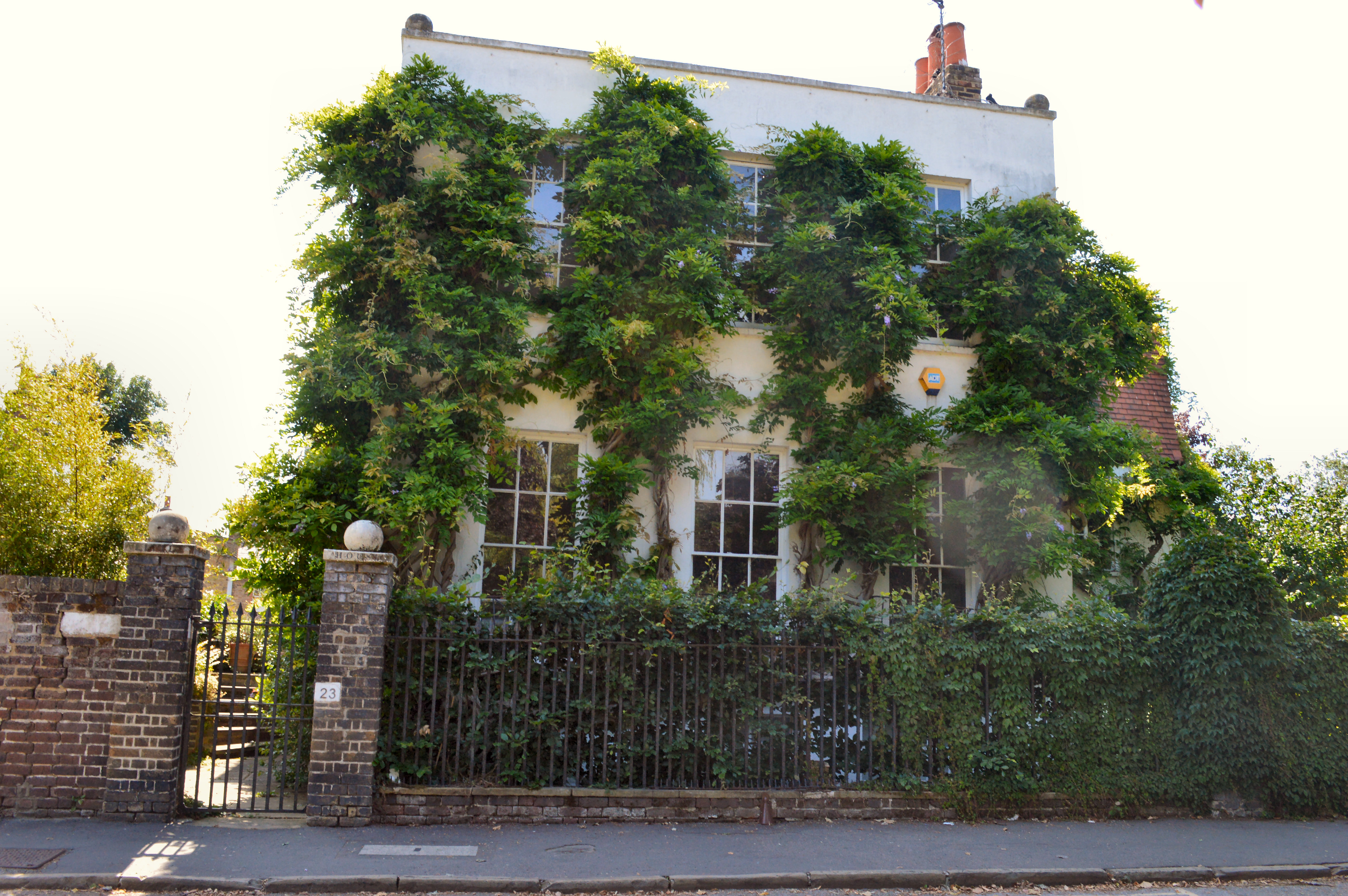
Ivycroft, Ham Common

In 1884, Smith was one of the co-founders (with Benjamin Waugh, Baroness Burdett-Coutts, Lord Shaftesbury and others) of the London Society for the Prevention of Cruelty to Children, which combined with similar societies in other cities such as Manchester to form the National Society for the Prevention of Cruelty to Children some five years later. However, she (and Burdett-Coutts) resigned after a decade in protest against what she saw as financial mismanagement.

In retirement in Richmond, Surrey, the Smith sisters ran a branch of the Popular Book Club for working-class readers. Sarah died after a long illness at home at Ivycroft on Ham Common, to which she moved in 1890, on 8 October 1911, surviving her sister Elizabeth by only eight months. She is buried at St Andrew's Church, Ham. Stretton Road in Ham is named after her.

== Bibliography ==
- Fern's Hollow (1864)
- Enoch Roden's Training (1865)
- The Children of Cloverly (1865)
- Jessica's First Prayer (1866, 1867)
- Jessica's Mother (1867, 1904)
- Pilgrim Street, a Story of Manchester Life (1867)
- Paul's Courtship (1867)
- Little Meg's Children (1868)
- David Lloyd's Last Will (1869)
- Alone in London (1869)
- Max Krömer: a Story of the Siege of Strasbourg, 1870 (1871)
- The Doctor's Dilemma (1872)
- Pilgrim Street (1872)
- Bede's Charity (1872)
- Lost Gip (1873)
- Michel Lorio's Cross (1873)
- Hester Morley's Promise (1873)
- Cassy (1874)
- Brought Home (1875)
- Through a Needle's Eye (1879)
- Cobwebs and Cables (1881)
- Under the Old Roof (1882)
- Half Brothers (1892)
- Little Meg's Children (1905)
- The Christmas Child (1909)

== Sources ==
- Lee, Sidney, ed. (1912). "Smith, Sarah" . Dictionary of National Biography (2nd supplement). Vol. 3. London: Smith, Elder & Co.
