= Ellen Ternan =

English actress (1839–1914)

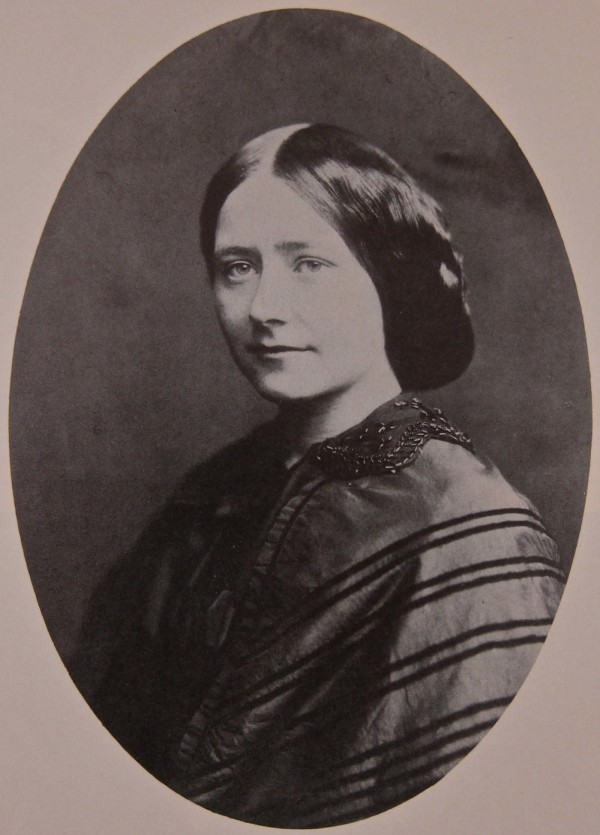
- Ternan at age 19 in 1858
- Born: Ellen Lawless Ternan; 3 March 1839; Rochester, Kent, England
- Died: 25 April 1914 (aged 75); Fulham, London, England
- Resting place: Portsmouth, England
- Occupation: Actress
- Spouse: George Wharton Robinson (m. 1876; died 1910)
- Partner: Charles Dickens (1857–1870; his death)
- Children: 2 or 3
- Parent: Frances Eleanor Jarman (mother)
- Relatives: Frances Eleanor Ternan (sister); Thomas Adolphus Trollope (brother-in-law)

Ellen Lawless Ternan (3 March 1839 – 25 April 1914), also known as Nelly Ternan or Nelly Wharton-Robinson, was an English actress known for her relationship with the older Charles Dickens.

== Birth and family life ==
Ellen Ternan was born in Rochester, Kent, which directly adjoins the town of Dickens' childhood, Chatham. She was the third of four children; she had a brother who died in infancy and two sisters named Maria and Frances (later the second wife of Thomas Adolphus Trollope, the brother of Anthony Trollope). Her parents, Thomas Lawless Ternan and Frances Eleanor Ternan (née Jarman), were both actors of some distinction.

== Theatre ==
Ternan made her stage debut in Sheffield at the age of three, and she and her two sisters were presented as "infant phenomena". Ellen was considered the least theatrically gifted of the three sisters, but she worked extensively in the provinces, particularly after her father died in October 1846 in the Bethnal Green Insane Asylum.

In 1857, she was spotted by Charles Dickens performing at London's Haymarket Theatre. He cast her, on the recommendation of his friend, actor and playwright Alfred Wigan, along with her mother and sister Maria, in three performances of The Frozen Deep by Wilkie Collins in Manchester in August 1857. It was not unusual for professional actresses to be invited to appear with amateur gentlemen; Mrs Ternan played a Scottish nurse; Maria, the heroine Clara; and Nelly (Ellen) took over the girl's part from Katey Dickens, Dickens's seventeen-year-old daughter.

== Association with Charles Dickens ==
In mid-September 1857, Charles Dickens went with Wilkie Collins to Doncaster to see Ellen Ternan perform in The Pet of the Petticoats at the Theatre Royal. At the time, he had written to John Forster that his relationship with his wife was disintegrating; 'Poor Catherine and I are not made for each other [-] What is now befalling I have seen steadily coming'.

Dickens was 45 years old when he met Ternan. She was 18 at the time, only 6 months older than his youngest daughter Katey. In two books published in 1935 and 1936, Thomas Wright alleged that they had an affair, stating that he had heard it from Canon Benham, who claimed that Ternan had confessed all. If so, Dickens kept his affair with Ternan secret from the general public.

There is little evidence pertaining to the nature of Charles Dickens and Ellen Ternan's relationship because neither Dickens, Ternan, nor Ternan's sisters left any account of it, and they destroyed most correspondence relevant to the relationship. We "simply do not know", asserts Michael Slater, the professor of Victorian literature with a special interest in Charles Dickens, in his 2009 biography of Dickens. On the "many speculations about the exact relationship between Dickens and Ellen in this period" biographer Peter Ackroyd writes, "it has to be said at once that no evidence has been found for any of these more dramatic possibilities." Writers prior to the scholarship of Ackroyd and Slater have largely assumed the truth of Wright's and other authors' assertions that Ternan was Dickens's mistress.

In 2021, the Irish author of historical fiction Cora Harrison suggested that Ternan might be Dickens's illegitimate daughter, rather than his mistress. This hypothesis was also proposed by Brian Ruck in The Dickensian in 2022. In 2025, Ruck published a book, Charles Dickens's Secret Lovechild: An Untarnished Portrait of Ellen Ternan, giving more detailed reasoning to support this alternative explanation of the relationship between Dickens and Ternan. Helena Kelly questioned this theory in her 2023 book.

Ternan was clever, charming, a force of character, and interested in literature and the theatre. Dickens referred to Ternan as his "magic circle of one." According to a "gossipy tale", matters came to a head in 1858 when Catherine Dickens opened a packet delivered by a London jeweller. It contained a gold bracelet meant for Ternan, with a note written by her husband. Charles and Catherine Dickens separated that May, after 22 years of marriage.

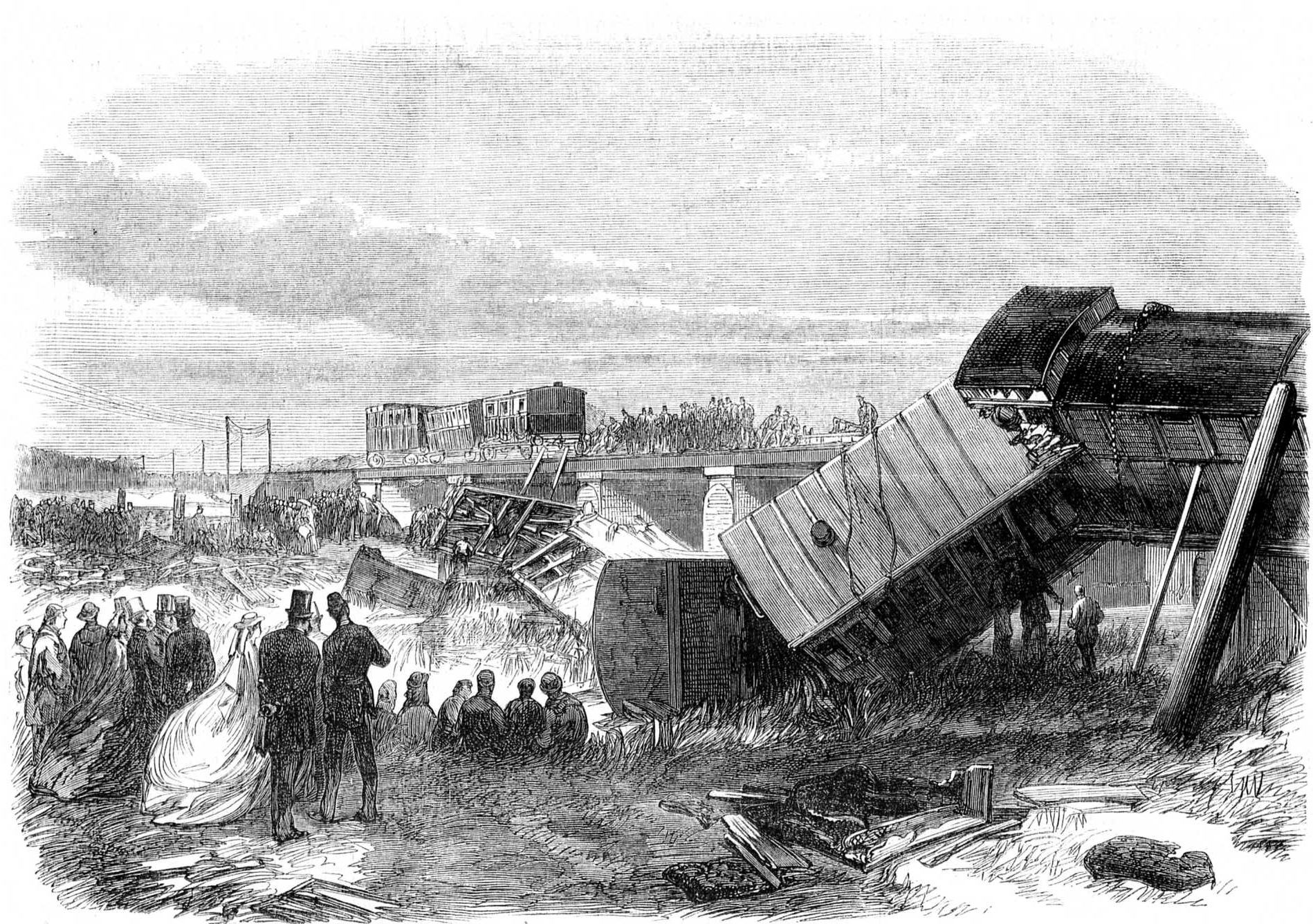
Ellen Ternan was travelling with Dickens when they were involved in the Staplehurst rail crash.

Ternan left the stage in 1860, and was financially supported by Dickens from that point onward. She sometimes travelled with him, which was the case in the event of the Staplehurst rail crash in Kent on 9 June 1865 as they and Ternan's mother were returning from a visit to France. Allegedly, he abandoned a plan to take her on his visit to America in 1867 for fear that their relationship would be publicized by the American press.

Ternan and her mother lived in houses Dickens took under false names at Slough in Berkshire and later at Nunhead in Southwark. There has been speculation that Ternan gave birth to a son who died in infancy. However, biographer Peter Ackroyd asserts that it is "inconceivable" that theirs was "in any sense a 'consummated' affair". Ackroyd's strength of feeling on this point is taken up by Harrison. A subplot of her 2020 fiction, Summer of Secrets, featuring Ternan, her mother, and Dickens, reveals her fictional Charles Dickens as the secret father of Ellen Ternan.

Dickens is thought by many scholars and commentators to have based several of his female characters on Ternan, including Estella in Great Expectations, Bella Wilfer in Our Mutual Friend and Helena Landless in The Mystery of Edwin Drood. Others may have been inspired by her, particularly Lucie Manette in A Tale of Two Cities. The close and loving relationships between fathers and daughters in some of the novels may support the suggestion that Ternan was Dickens's daughter. Dickens left a legacy of £1,000 to Ternan in his will on his death in 1870, precisely the same amount as to his unmarried daughter, and sufficient income from a trust fund to ensure that she would never have to work again.

== Later life and marriage ==
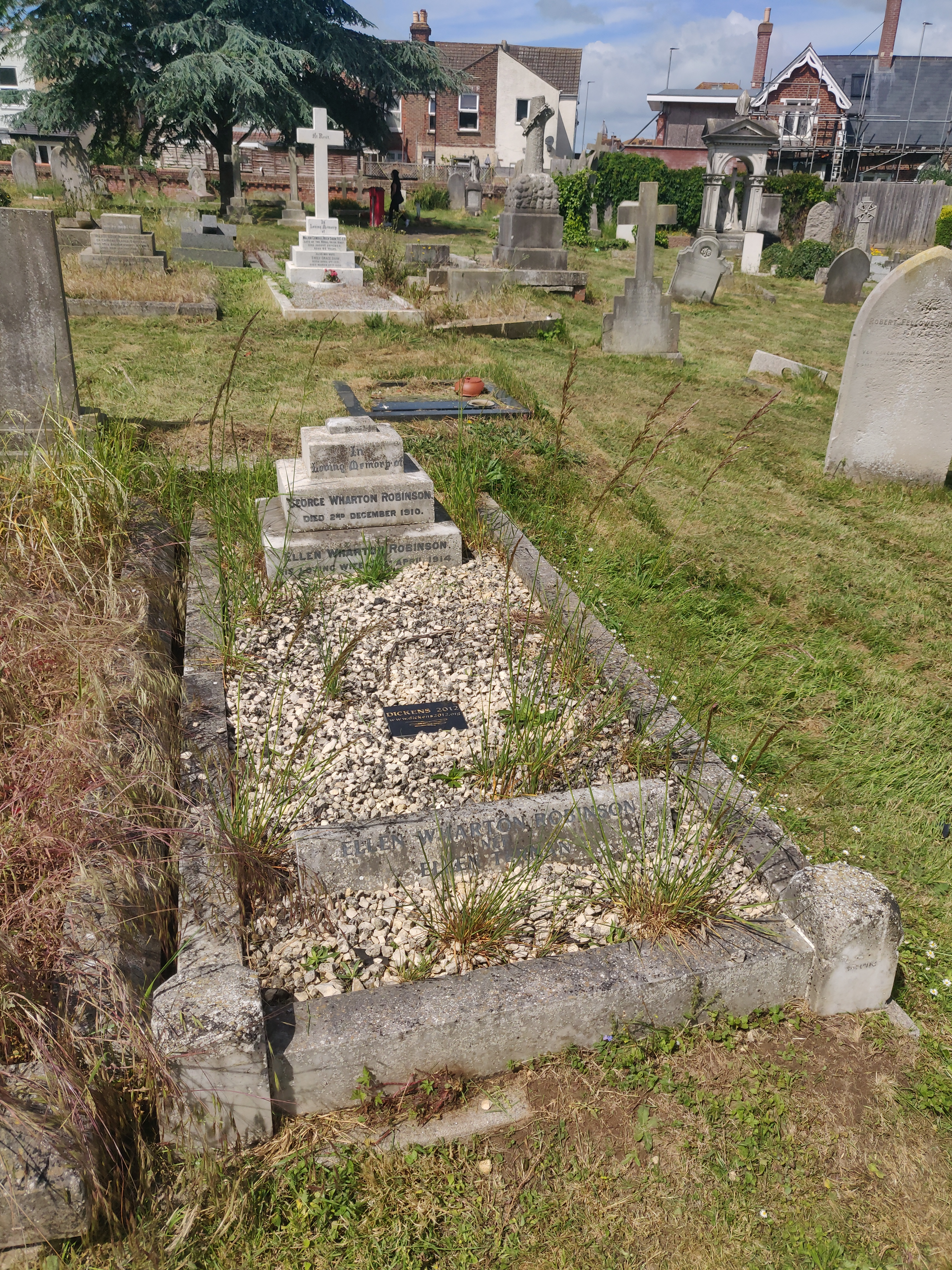
Grave of Ellen and her husband George Wharton Robinson in Highland Road Cemetery, Portsmouth.

In 1876, six years after Dickens's death, Ternan met and married George Wharton Robinson, an Oxford graduate, who was 12 years her junior and knew nothing of her close association with Dickens. She presented herself as 14 years younger (23 years old, rather than 37). The couple had a son, Geoffrey, and a daughter, Gladys, and ran a boys' school in Margate. Ternan's husband died in 1910, and she spent her last years in Southsea with her sister Frances. She died of cancer in Fulham, London on April 25, 1914, and is buried in Highland Road Cemetery in Portsmouth, the city of Dickens's birth.

== Speculation and research ==
The Dickens Fellowship and the surviving close family members of Charles Dickens maintained a complete silence about the relationship between Ellen Ternan and Charles Dickens from the time of Charles Dickens' death in 1870 until the death in December 1933 of his last surviving child, Sir Henry Fielding Dickens. Several Dickens researchers wrote about various aspects of the relationship between Ellen Ternan and Charles Dickens in the ensuing years, including Gladys Story in 1939, Ada Nisbet in 1952, Sir Felix Aylmer in 1959, and Katherine M Longley in 1985. Ellen Ternan was the subject of a biography by Claire Tomalin in 1990, which brought the relationship to a broader general audience. A summary of the story of the discovery of the relationship was published in 2012 by Professor Michael Slater.

Some records relating to Ellen Ternan and her family are held by Senate House Library, University of London.

== Portrayal in theatre and television ==
Simon Gray's play about her life, Little Nell, had its world premiere in 2007 at the Theatre Royal, Bath. It was directed by Sir Peter Hall and starred Louise Brealey as Ternan. The affair was featured in the docudramas Dickens (BBC, 2002) and Dickens' Secret Lovers (2008, Channel 4 – it was the main subject of this programme, presented by Charles Dance and with Ternan played by Amy Shiels and Dickens by David Haig).

== Portrayal in novels ==
Cora Harrison's 2020 novel Summer of Secrets portrays Dickens and Wilkie Collins, among other writers and artists, together with Ellen Ternan and her mother, in a murder mystery tale. Ellen Ternan is forbidden from marrying Dickens's son, by both Dickens and Mrs Ternan, on the grounds that she is their daughter. Ternan also features in the 2009 novel Drood by Dan Simmons.

== Portrayal in film ==
The Invisible Woman (2013) is a feature film adaptation of Tomalin's book about Ternan's relationship with Dickens. Ternan is played by Felicity Jones and Dickens by Ralph Fiennes. The 21-year age difference between the two actors is somewhat similar to the 27-year difference between Ternan and Dickens.
