= William Hall (publisher) =

British bookseller and publisher (1800–1847)

William Hall (19 October 1800 – 7 March 1847) was a British publisher who, with Edward Chapman, founded Chapman & Hall, publishers for Charles Dickens (from 1840 until 1844 and again from 1858 until 1870), William Thackeray, Robert Browning, Elizabeth Barrett Browning, Anthony Trollope, Eadweard Muybridge and Evelyn Waugh among others.

== Life ==
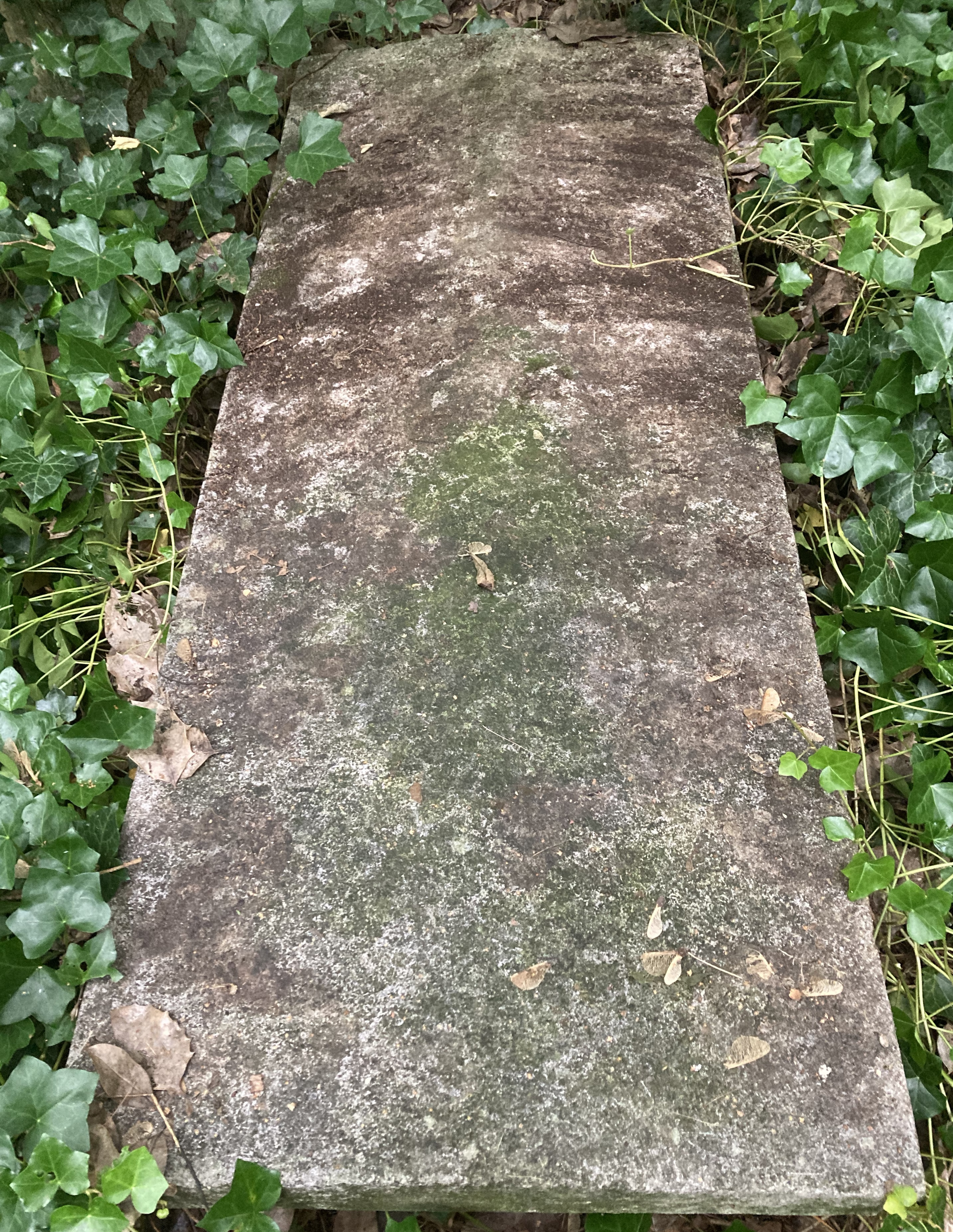
Grave of William Hall in Highgate Cemetery

Little is known of his early life. He was born in London, the son of John Hall and his wife, Elizabeth. His brother Spencer Hall became librarian of the Athenaeum Club. With Edward Chapman (1804–1880) he founded a bookselling and publishing business at 186 Strand, London, in 1830, having bought out a small journal called Chat Of The Week. According to Robert L. Patten, by 1835 they were publishing illustrated fiction and magazines issued weekly or monthly. Chapman is thought to have had the literary skills to be able to spot a saleable book while Hall had the business acumen to sell it.

In 1835, Chapman and Hall published Squib Annual of Poetry, Politics, and Personalities by the illustrator Robert Seymour. In 1836 Seymour proposed to William Hall that Chapman & Hall should publish a series of sporting illustrations by Seymour with short written sketches linking them together in some way. Further he developed the idea of a "Nimrod Club" of sporting people having adventures as the framework for the sketches and illustrations. Chapman agreed that the work should be issued in monthly parts, with descriptive text by Charles Dickens. However, Dickens, then only 22, was not the first choice as writer. Charled Whitehead, the senior editor in the publishing house, did not have time to complete the work so recommended Dickens on the basis of his recently published and successful Sketches by Boz, also in a monthly periodical format. Eventually, this became The Pickwick Papers, and concerned the adventures of Samuel Pickwick and his friends. Following the suicide of Robert Seymour, Dickens suggested to William Hall that Hablot Knight Browne should be the new illustrator. In May 1837, The Pickwick Papers sold more than 20,000 copies and Hall sent Dickens a cheque for £500 as a bonus above the agreed payment. By the end of its monthly publications, Pickwick was selling over 40,000 copies a month and Dickens received a further £2,000 bonus with Chapman & Hall making about £14,000 from the publication.

Charles Dickens attended Hall's wedding in 1840, an event he fictionalized for Sketches of Young Couples which Chapman and Hall published in 1840. There Mr Chirrup (Hall) is described as having the smartness and ‘the brisk, quick manner of a small bird’. After Dickens spent many "pleasant, playful evenings" at their house in Norwood. Dickens also arranged for his friends such as Thomas Carlyle to be published by Chapman and Hall and for John Forster to become the literary advisor to the company.

William Hall died suddenly at Chapman & Hall's office at 186 Strand, London, in March 1847, aged 46. Charles Dickens attended his burial on the western side of Highgate Cemetery (plot no.539).

On Hall's death, Edward Chapman's cousin Frederic Chapman began his progress through the ranks of the company, eventually becoming a partner in 1858 and sole proprietor on Edward Chapman's retirement from Chapman & Hall in 1866.

In the film The Man Who Invented Christmas (2017), Hall was played by David McSavage.
