= Frederic Chapman =

English publisher

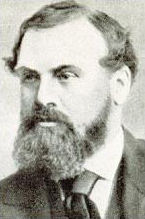
- Born: 1823; Hitchin, Herefordshire
- Died: 3 January 1895 (aged 71–72); London
- Occupation: Publisher

Frederic Chapman (1823 – 1 March 1895) was a publisher of the Victorian era who became a partner in Chapman & Hall, who published the works of Charles Dickens and Robert Browning and Elizabeth Barrett Browning, among others.

== Early years ==
Frederic Chapman was the youngest son of Michael and Mary Chapman of Hitchin in Hertfordshire. He was born at Cork Street, Hitchin, in 1823, in the house which had belonged to his collateral ancestor, George Chapman, the poet, and was educated at Hitchin Grammar School. At the age of eighteen he was employed as a clerk at Chapman & Hall, publishers, a firm founded in 1834, of which his cousin, Edward Chapman, was the head. The publishing house was then at 186 Strand. In 1850 it was removed to 193 Piccadilly, and it finally, in March 1881, took up its quarters in Henrietta Street, Covent Garden.

== Joins Chapman & Hall ==
On the death of William Hall (of Chapman & Hall) in March 1847 Frederic Chapman began his progress in the company, becoming a partner in 1858. On 24 December 1858 The Bookseller announced that "the firm of Messrs. Chapman & Hall has been strengthened by the admission of Mr. Frederic Chapman who has for some years taken an active part in the management." The author of Charles Dickens and his Publishers (1978) wrote of him: "Frederic Chapman rose to the status of partner. The firm enjoyed some good years. The expansion of railways, circulating libraries, and middle-class leisure improved book sales; Dickens's full-scale return to Chapman and Hall in 1859 afforded Frederic an opportunity to issue a new Dickens periodical, All the Year Round, and new serial fictions, and to reissue in new formats older titles and multiple collected editions - all of which eventually turned a profit." With Charles Dickens his relations were long and very close. Dickens's connection with Chapman & Hall began in 1836, when William Hall made to Dickens the suggestion which ultimately led to the publication of The Pickwick Papers. The firm subsequently published Nicholas Nickleby, Master Humphrey's Clock, Barnaby Rudge, The Old Curiosity Shop, Martin Chuzzlewit, and A Christmas Carol; but in 1844 Dickens quarrelled with the firm, and entered into relations with Bradbury & Evans. In 1859, however, Dickens renewed his connection with Chapman & Hall, who issued the remainder of his books. In 1845 Chapman & Hall published the second edition of Thomas Carlyle's Life of Schiller, and soon after 1880, when the business was turned into a company, it purchased the copyright of Carlyle's works.

Percy Fitzgerald, who was also published by him, later wrote of Chapman: "An excellent fellow he was somewhat blunt and bluff, but straightforward and good-natured. On his shoulders, even when Edward Chapman was alive, lay the burden. He was a tall, burly, rubicund man, and had good business instinct. He had a small but delightful house in Ovington Square, to which some one had added a billiard-room, which he turned into a charming dining-room."

== Becomes a Partner ==
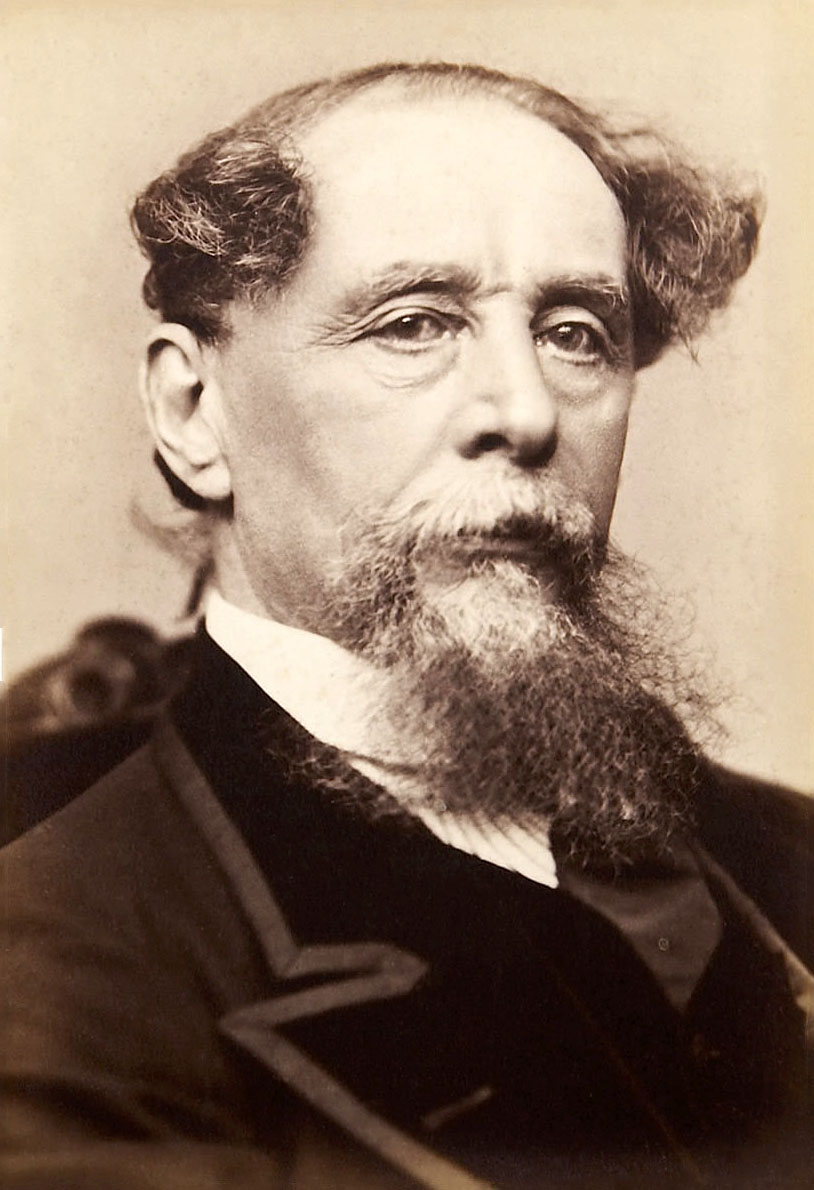
Chapman & Hall published Charles Dickens for much of his career

In 1860 Frederic Chapman projected The Fortnightly Review, which was eventually published twice a month in 1865 and was first edited by George Henry Lewes. When John Morley was appointed editor in 1867 it became a monthly periodical. When Morley retired from the editorship in 1883 he was succeeded in turn by T. H. S. Escott, Frank Harris, and W. L. Courtney. The Fortnightly Review was not a commercial success and in 1869 to attempt to raise new capital Frederic Chapman sold a third of the company to Anthony Trollope, who passed it on to his son, Henry Merivale Trollope, who remained a partner for three and a half years. On the retirement of Edward Chapman from Chapman & Hall in 1866 Frederic Chapman became the head of the firm. His biographer, Robert L. Patten, wrote: "Chapman, backed by several wealthy friends, arranged for a multi-year buy-out and became chief proprietor. In this position he embarked upon a pushing and successful policy of bulk sales to large distributors for railway and overseas markets. Such transactions moved a great deal of paper for comparatively little administrative effort." For a time he published the works of William Makepeace Thackeray, Thomas Carlyle, Harrison Ainsworth, Edward Bulwer Lytton, Robert Browning and Elizabeth Barrett Browning, Arthur Hugh Clough, Charles Lever, Elizabeth Gaskell, Charles Kingsley, Anthony Trollope and George Meredith were all clients of the firm. In 1880 Chapman turned his business into a limited company, at the head of which he remained until the time of his death. On 28 March 1870, three months before his death, Charles Dickens signed an agreement with Frederic Chapman and Henry Trollope confirming their shared ownership of Dickens's copyrights. Chapman bought the remainder of those copyrights after Dickens's death; he also carefully cultivated Dickens' relatives Georgina Hogarth and Mary Dickens when they proposed to edit Dickens's letters. Dickens, in fact, made Chapman & Hall rich.

Chapman was on intimate terms with numerous men of letters of his day. He was a keen sportsman — a hunting man in his earlier days, and to the last an expert shot.

== Personal life ==
Frederic Chapman died of influenza on 1 March 1895 at his house at 10 Ovington Square, London. He was twice married; in 1861 he married Clara, eldest daughter of Joseph Woodin of Petersham, Surrey. By her he left a son, Frederic Hamilton Chapman, an officer in the Duke of Cornwall's light infantry. In the winter of 1866 she lost a child, and a few weeks later she herself died. Robert Browning was surprised to meet Chapman at a dinner a fortnight after his wife's death. Chapman explained that it was better than moping at home, and that the death of his child seemed to prepare him for the second bereavement. His second wife, who survived him, was Annie Marion, daughter of Sir Robert Harding, chief commissioner in bankruptcy. He married her in 1867 and by her he left a daughter, Reine, married to Harold Brooke Alder.
