= Robert Seymour (illustrator) =

British illustrator (1798–1836)

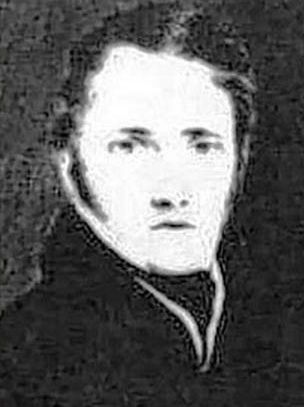
Robert Seymour

Robert Seymour (1798 – 20 April 1836) was a British illustrator known for his illustrations for The Pickwick Papers by Charles Dickens and for his caricatures. He committed suicide after arguing with Dickens over the illustrations for Pickwick.

== Early years ==
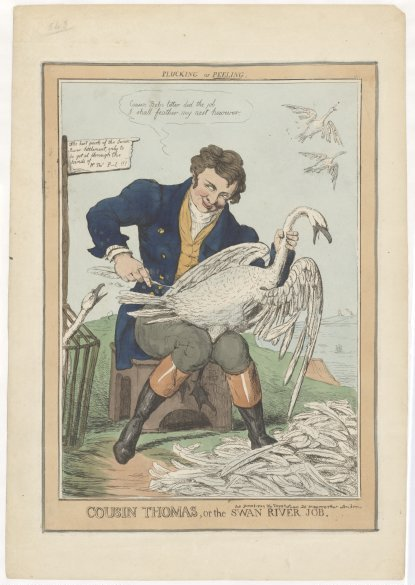
Cousin Thomas, or, the Swan River Job An 1829 political caricature of Thomas Peel by Robert Seymour

Seymour was born in Somerset, England in 1798, the second son of Henry Seymour and Elizabeth Bishop. Soon after moving to London Henry Seymour died, leaving his wife, two sons and daughter impoverished. In 1827 his mother died, and Seymour married his cousin Jane Holmes, having two children, Robert and Jane.

After his father died, Robert Seymour was apprenticed as a pattern-drawer to a Mr. Vaughan of Duke Street, Smithfield, London. Influenced by painter Joseph Severn RA, during frequent visits to his uncle Thomas Holmes of Hoxton, Robert's ambition to be a professional painter was achieved at the age of 24 when, in 1822, his painting of a scene from Torquato Tasso's Jerusalem Delivered, with over 100 figures, was exhibited at the Royal Academy.

He was commissioned to illustrate the works of William Shakespeare, John Milton, Miguel de Cervantes, and William Wordsworth. He also produced innumerable portraits, miniatures, landscapes, etc., as can be seen in two Sketchbooks; Windsor; Eaton; Figure Studies; Portraits at the Victoria and Albert Museum. After the rejection of his second Royal Academy submission, he continued to paint in oils, mastered techniques of copper engraving, and began illustrating books for a living.

From 1822–27, Seymour produced designs for a wide range of subjects including: poetry; melodramas; children's stories; and topographical and scientific works. A steady supply of such work enabled him to live comfortably and enjoy his library and fishing and shooting expeditions with his friends: Lacey the publisher, and the illustrator George Cruikshank. In 1827, the year of his mother's death and his marriage, Robert Seymour's publishers, Knight and Lacey, were made bankrupt, owing Seymour a considerable amount of money.

In 1827, Seymour then found steady employment when his etchings and engravings were accepted by the publisher Thomas McLean. Learning to etch on the newly fashionable steel-plates, Seymour then first began to specialize in caricatures and other humorous subjects. In 1830, having mastered the art of etching, Seymour then lithographed separate prints and book illustrations; he was then invited by McLean to produce the 1830 caricature magazine called Looking Glass, as etched throughout by William Heath, for which Seymour produced four large lithographed sheets of illustrations, usually drawn several to a page, every month for the following six years, until his death in 1836.

== Conflicts with Figaro ==
In 1831, Seymour began work for a new magazine called Figaro in London (pre-Punch), producing 300 humorous drawings and political caricatures to accompany the mundane, political topics of the day and the texts of owner and editor Gilbert à Beckett (1811–56). A cheap weekly, Figaro reflected the clever but abusive character of à Beckett, a friend of Charles Dickens and the publisher of George Cruikshank, who, in 1827, protested at Seymour's parody of his work and nom-de-plume of 'Shortshanks'. Graham Everitt, in English Caricaturists & Graphic Humourists of the Nineteenth Century (London, 1885), wrote, "The mainstay and prop of the paper from its commencement was Seymour."

In 1834, Gilbert à Beckett failed to pay Seymour what he owed him, and Seymour resigned. A' Beckett replaced him with Cruikshank's brother Robert, and cruelly libelled Seymour in the paper, claiming he had gone insane. Seymour responded by satirising a' Beckett in a rival publication as the very small editor of a very poor paper. Without Seymour, sales of the paper slumped and a' Beckett was declared bankrupt that December. When Henry Mayhew replaced à Beckett as editor of Figaro he enticed Seymour back for the first issue of January, 1835, and Seymour would go on to work harmoniously with Mayhew illustrating Figaro until his death.

Author Joseph Grego, writing sixty-six years after Seymour's death, repeated a claim that arose in the 1880s that a' Beckett's humiliating public smear was attributed as a cause for the coroner's suicide verdict. According to George Somes Layard, writing the entry for Robert Seymour in the 1895-1900 edition of The Dictionary of National Biography, this claim was 'contradicted by chronology', because the dispute between a' Beckett and Seymour occurred several years prior to Seymour's death.

Seymour's eminence as an illustrator now equalled that of his friend George Cruikshank and, as one of the greatest artists since the days of Hogarth, Sir Richard Phillips, predicted that, if he lived, he would become President of the Royal Academy. In 1834, at the height of his prosperity, Seymour launched a new series of lithographs, Sketches by Seymour (1834–36), all depicting expeditions of over-equipped and under-trained Cockneys pursuing cats, birds and stray pigs on foot and on horseback, as experienced in his 1827 fishing and shooting expeditions with his friend Cruickshank.

== The Posthumous Papers of the Pickwick Club ==
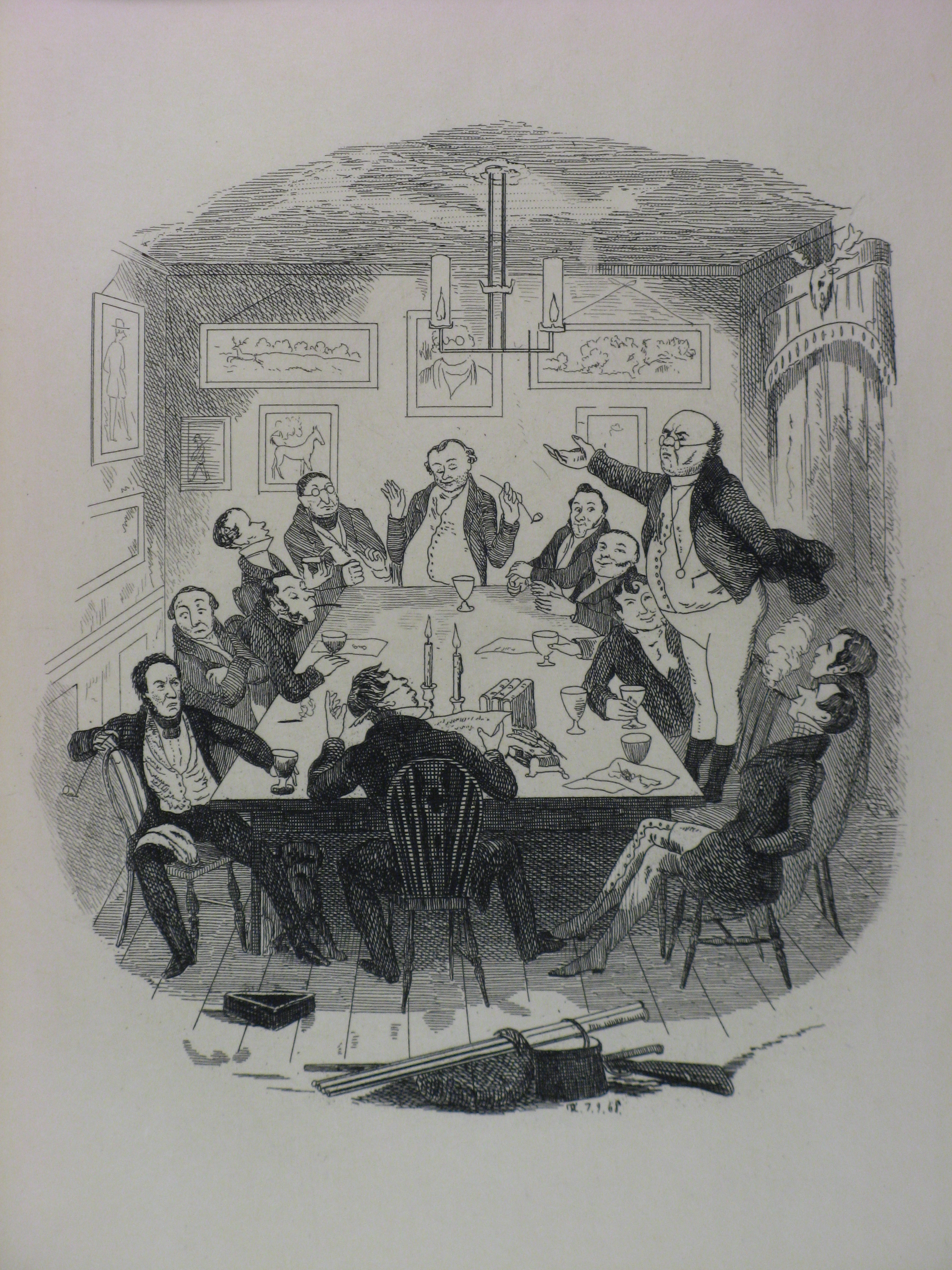
Mr. Pickwick Addresses the Club

Seymour's caricatures were immensely popular, all being humorous and satirical. He primarily poked fun at politicians and sportsmen, although he sometimes predicted the future with his tongue firmly in his cheek, and took on social issues such as excessive drinking. Characters he developed were continued into the early life of the Pickwick Papers.

There is considerable controversy about who is intellectually responsible for the creation of the Pickwick Papers. It is agreed by Seymour's widow, the publisher Chapman and Hall, and Charles Dickens (1812–70) and Dickens' close friend and biographer John Forster that the original idea prompting Dickens's writing commission came from Seymour. Dickens biographer John Camden Hotten, in his 1866 book Sketches by Seymour, revealed that Seymour had originally conceived a linked series of prints about the travails of an amateur gardener, based on Seymour's own efforts in his large Islington garden. Hotten wrote that, deciding there was more potential in a series about the hunting and fishing mishaps of a band of sporting friends, based on his own sporting misadventures, Seymour began touting that idea around London publishers in the summer of 1835.

Thomas McLean declined the idea, but William Spooner was interested and suggested Theodore Hook to write the texts, but after Hook did not respond to Spooner's approach he lost interest. Seymour began thinking about who might write the texts, and considered two potential authors, one of them a publisher, the other a well known playwright. While delivering a drawing to his existing publisher Edward Chapman (Chapman and Hall) in November, 1835, Seymour put his idea to him.

Chapman was immediately interested, and proposed a book of four half-guinea volumes. Seymour was intent on a monthly shilling serial magazine running for twenty months, which would allow him time to spread the work between his other commissions. Chapman and Hall had no experience with monthly serials, which had been popular in the past, but nonetheless agreed to Seymour's concept. As revealed in her Origin of The Pickwick Papers, when Seymour's wife urged Seymour to ask four times his usual illustration fee for the project, Chapman and Hall agreed to that increased fee to prevent Seymour accepting another offer from William Kidd, with publication of the serial to commence on 31 March 1836.

Edward Chapman suggested author William Clarke to write the texts, but he proved unavailable. With publication fast approaching, in February, 1836, another author who wrote for Chapman and Hall suggested 'hack' journalist Charles Dickens, who was published under the name of 'Boz', and whose 'Sketches by Boz' was published in book form by John Macrone that same month of February after initially appearing in the daily press. This made Dickens the fifth writer considered for the project.

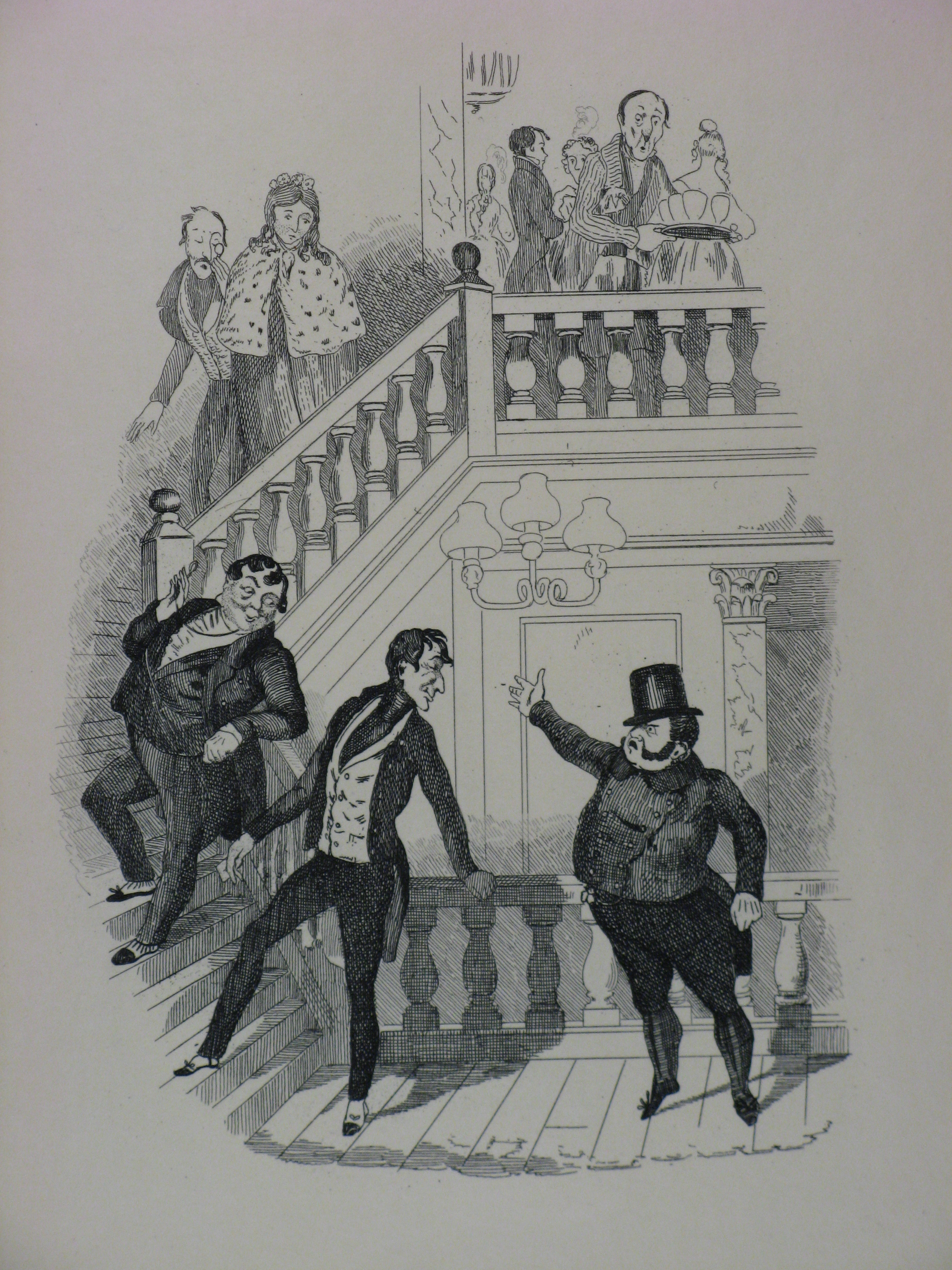
Dr. Slammer's Defiance of Jingle

When Dickens was approached by publisher William Hall on 10 February 1836, Dickens made it clear that he was not a sporting person and therefore could not write this kind of sketch. But he liked the idea of a club, and agreed to take on the project on condition Pickwick Club member Mr Winkle was the only main character interested in sports. Due to the lack of time, Seymour agreed to this change and approved Dickens' appointment as his writer for the series.

Seymour already had the main characters in sketch form, and had already engraved the first four Pickwick illustrations onto steel plates in 1835 ready for publication. He had originally drawn and published central character Samuel Pickwick as far back as 1832.

The first 'number' of The Pickwick Papers was produced with Seymour and Dickens working in reasonable harmony and it appeared on schedule at the end of March. For the second instalment, Dickens began to cause problems, claiming his honeymoon following his 2 April marriage to Catherine Hogarth would prevent him from writing a fully original text for the April instalment and insisting he be allowed to insert an existing story of his, "The Stroller's Tale", and also insisting that Seymour draw an illustration based on that story. This reversed the order whereby he had previously written to Seymour's illustrations - something Dickens would vehemently deny following Seymour's death, when he persistently claimed credit for originating almost every aspect of The Pickwick Papers.

The credit for the rotund final visual version of Mr Pickwick was given by Dickens to Edward Chapman, who, thirteen years after Pickwick commenced publication, claimed Mr Pickwick's appearance was based on his own acquaintance John Foster of Richmond. Extensive research over a number of years in the early 2000's by Dickens scholar Stephen Jarvis, author of Death and Mr Pickwick, found no trace in official records of any adult John Foster of Richmond during the relevant period. Seymour certainly had some characters similar to the round Mr Pickwick in his work before this time. It also seems reasonable that Seymour used his previous work to help create the character, and Dickens is reported as saying that he had "made him a reality". Realistically, the character of Mr Pickwick as he developed in the story can be said to be an amalgamation of ideas from artist and author.

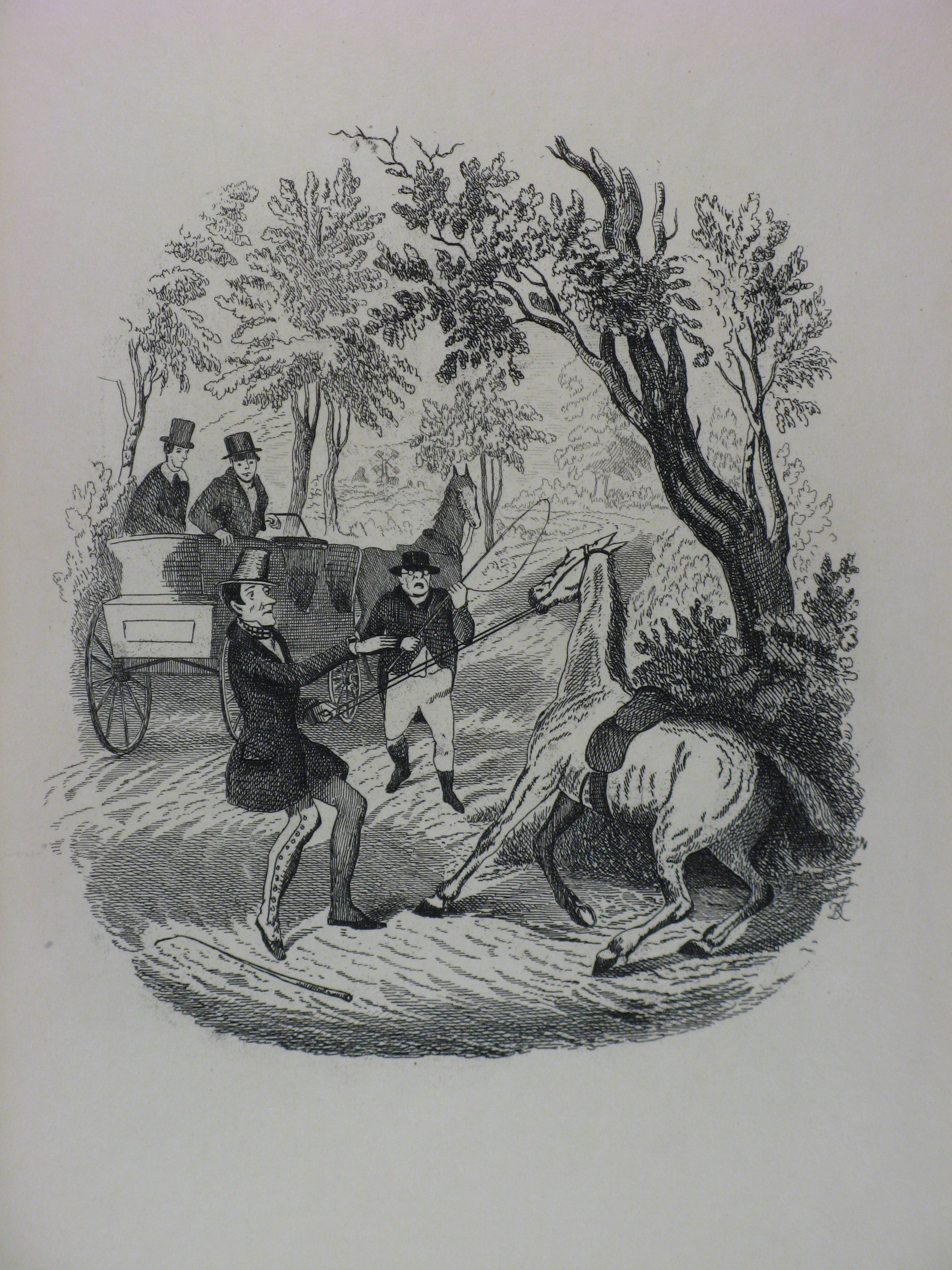
Mr. Winkle Soothes the Refractory Steed

It is not known how much of The Pickwick Papers Seymour created. His wife claimed he was responsible for originating, and naming, the Pickwick Club and all the main characters by 1835. The London press also gave him credit for creating Sam Weller (see below), who did not appear in the story until after Seymour's death. It was pointed out that Seymour had previously drawn the exact figure of Sam as 'Jack the angler' in the 1834 book Hints for Anglers, and that same figure would be faithfully reproduced as Sam Weller by subsequent Pickwick illustrators.

Many years after The Pickwick Papers was first published Dickens made a new claim, that Seymour's original idea was for a Nimrod Club, which Dickens changed to the Pickwick Club. No other contemporary source, including publisher Edward Chapman, supported that assertion. It is possible that Seymour had mentioned to Chapman and Hall that he wanted his Pickwick Club story to follow the same lines as a popular 1834 novel about bumbling country squire John Mytton, but with a sporting bias. That Mytton book, The Chase, the Turf and the Road, was by Charles James Apperly, who wrote it using the pen name of Nimrod. It is also entirely possible that William Hall subsequently mentioned this book by Nimrod to Dickens when he approached him in February, 1836, and that Dickens either misremembered the Nimrod reference years later, or deliberately misconstrued it to make the claim that Seymour had originally intended his Pickwick Club to be the Nimrod Club. Either way, Dickens's late Nimrod claim confounded his long held assertion that he had originated every aspect of The Pickwick Papers and that Seymour only followed his writing, because it acknowledged that Seymour not only already had a club in mind when Dickens was approached to become the writer for the series, Seymour had also named that club.

Seymour died before the second instalment was published. The frontage illustration that was issued on the 'wrapper' or cover of the first magazine edition reads "The Posthumous Papers of the Pickwick Club – containing a faithful record of the perambulations, perils, travels, adventures and Sporting Transactions of the corresponding members. Edited by 'Boz', with Four Illustrations by Seymour". Chapman and Hall placed advertisements for The Postumus Papers of the Pickwick Club in The Times and The Athenaeum in which the use of four illustrations by Seymour was strongly promoted. Following his death, Seymour's name was removed by the publishers from subsequent reprints of the first instalment, produced to meet demand once The Pickwick Papers gained in popularity. In those reprints, the cover simply stated 'With Illustrations'.

The original frontage piece, drawn by Seymour, features fishing and shooting references. What sporting ideas may have been held as an original notion by Seymour were not realized in the magazine series, and after Seymour's death the focus of the stories followed Dickens' ideas.

Dickens himself created controversy by saying that only 24 pages had been written for the second edition when Seymour committed suicide. It was pointed out by Joseph Grego in the 1899 book 'Pictorial Pickwickian' that in fact Seymour had created the draft image of "The Pickwickians in Mr. Wardle's Kitchen". The discrepancy is in the idea that the last illustration for the story was to go on page '50'. There were only meant to be 48 written pages complete or in draft stage. But the Pickwickians do end up in Mr Wardle's kitchen by the end of the second magazine issue regardless of what page this data was meant to have been published on.

No images have been found which belong to ideas written later in the series but only ideas which were published in line with commissioned work for the second magazine. The page count may not include illustrated pages (hardcopy reference required) which would increase the count to a total of 56 sides plus index and frontage pages etc. across the first two editions of the magazine.

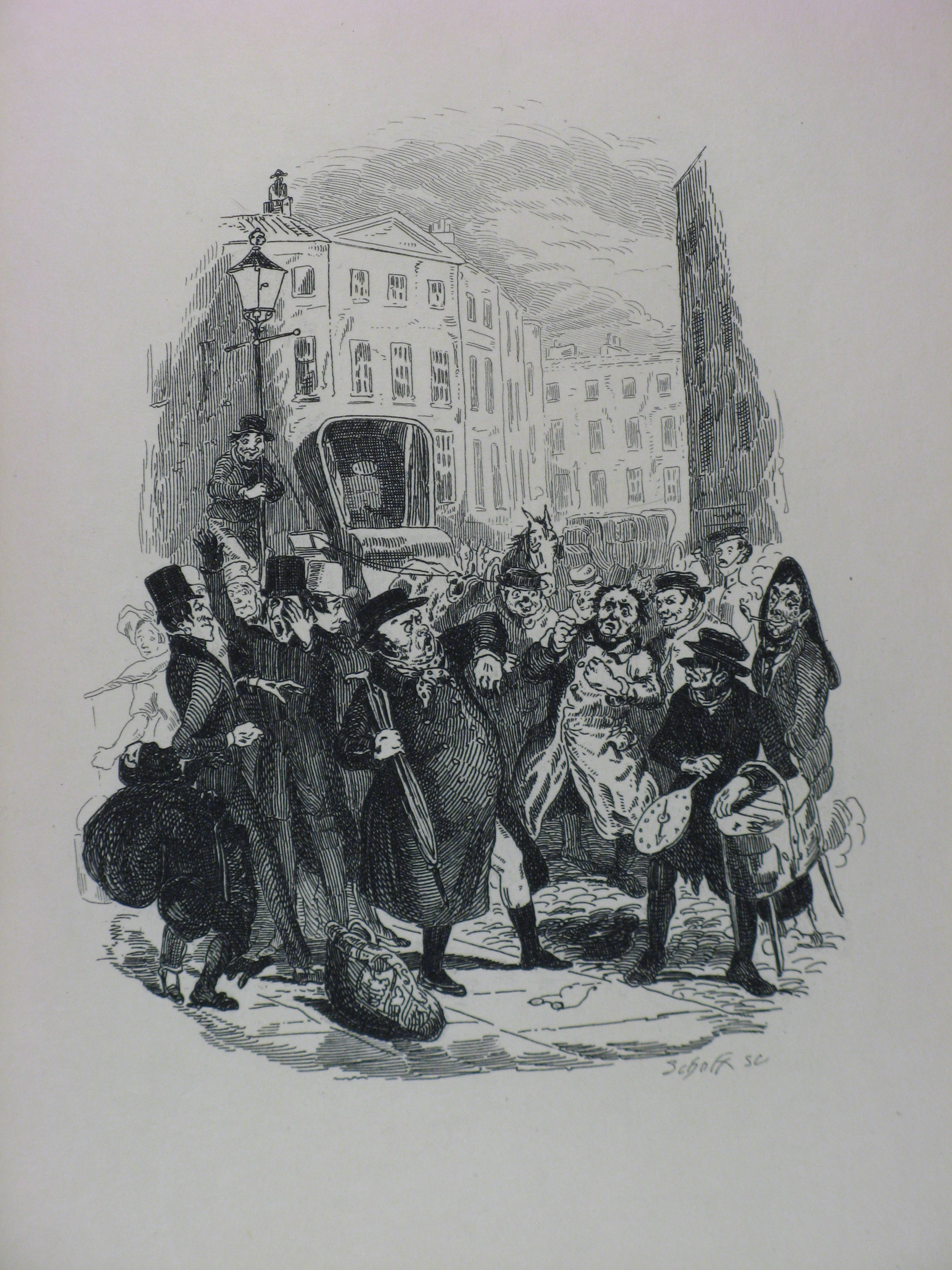
The Pugnacious Cabman

The magazine was to be distributed at the end of each month. The second edition was finished with just three Seymour illustrations. Dickens changed the format for the 3rd edition of the magazine increasing the text to 32 pages and reducing the illustrations to two per issue, increasing his written input and fee.

The fact that Seymour was already planning the third instalment of The Pickwick Papers at the time of his death would much later be indicated by the fact that, in 1889, Sotheby's sold a verified Seymour illustration 'The Runaway Chaise' featuring Mr Pickwick, to an American collector, together with Seymour's four original drawings for the first instalment, and his 'The Pickwickians in Mr Wardle's Kitchen' which Seymour drew for the second number, but which Chapman and Hall did not use for unexplained reasons. All six of these illustrations had been in the Seymour family's possession.

Seymour's widow argued that the Pickwick Club would have existed without Dickens. It is clear that the Pickwick Club was Seymour's idea and was in effect a more story-driven version of the highly popular Seymour's sketches, but it is not The Pickwick Papers in its published version. It may have been better for Seymour to pursue his idea for his magazine with another publisher or with a writer less interested in being the dominant partner. It is highly unlikely that Dickens would have created a platform like the Pickwick Club without Seymour's prompting ideas and illustrations, but it is clear that the complete story of The Pickwick Papers is the result of Dickens's creative process in terms of story content, even if he did not originate the main characters.

Seymour's widow received no royalties, and the success of the project created a sense of injustice. The Pickwick Papers would not have existed without Seymour, but the copyright laws of the time gave the copyright to the publishers, so the obligation to recompense Seymour's family lay primarily with the publishers. Nevertheless, it could be argued that Dickens had a moral obligation to share some of the fortune he made from Pickwick with Seymour's destitute widow and children, (he made many thousands from Pickwick). Dickens claimed that on one occasion he gave Jane Seymour five pounds. He later actively sabotaged two efforts by editors, writers and artists led by Atlas editor Robert Bell to arrange a book and a stage show to benefit the Seymour family. In the first instance Dickens produced The Pic-Nic Papers, a collection of stories and illustrations from various contributors put together to benefit the widow of publisher John Macrone, after Dickens was approached to support the proposed book to benefit Jane Seymour and her children. Dickens even poached some of the promised contributors to the Seymour book for The Pic-Nic Papers. While undistinguished, that book raised four hundred and fifty pounds for Macrone's widow.

It is thought that Dickens had sought a new illustrator for The Pickwick Papers while Seymour was still alive, even though the project was Seymour's, after Seymour resisted drawing one illustration in line with Dickens's ideas. This was "The Dying Clown", which is harsh and emotional, a huge way from the funny and lighthearted illustrations which Seymour had envisioned for the series. Until English law changed in 1870, suicide could produce a verdict of felo de se (felon to self). This meant the person did not receive a religious burial and his family was denied any of his estate. This left Seymour's widow and children penniless, and they were forced to leave Seymour's large Islington house and move in with Jane Seymour's brother Edward Holmes.

The illustrator's commission then passed to Robert William Buss, but, these being judged by Dickens and the publishers to be unsatisfactory, was then passed to young Hablot Knight Browne who initially drew under the name of Nemo before taking the name Phiz to harmonise with Dickens's Boz. Browne illustrated Pickwick from issue four of the magazine until its completion in 1837. Browne also completed illustrations for the book version.

== Death ==
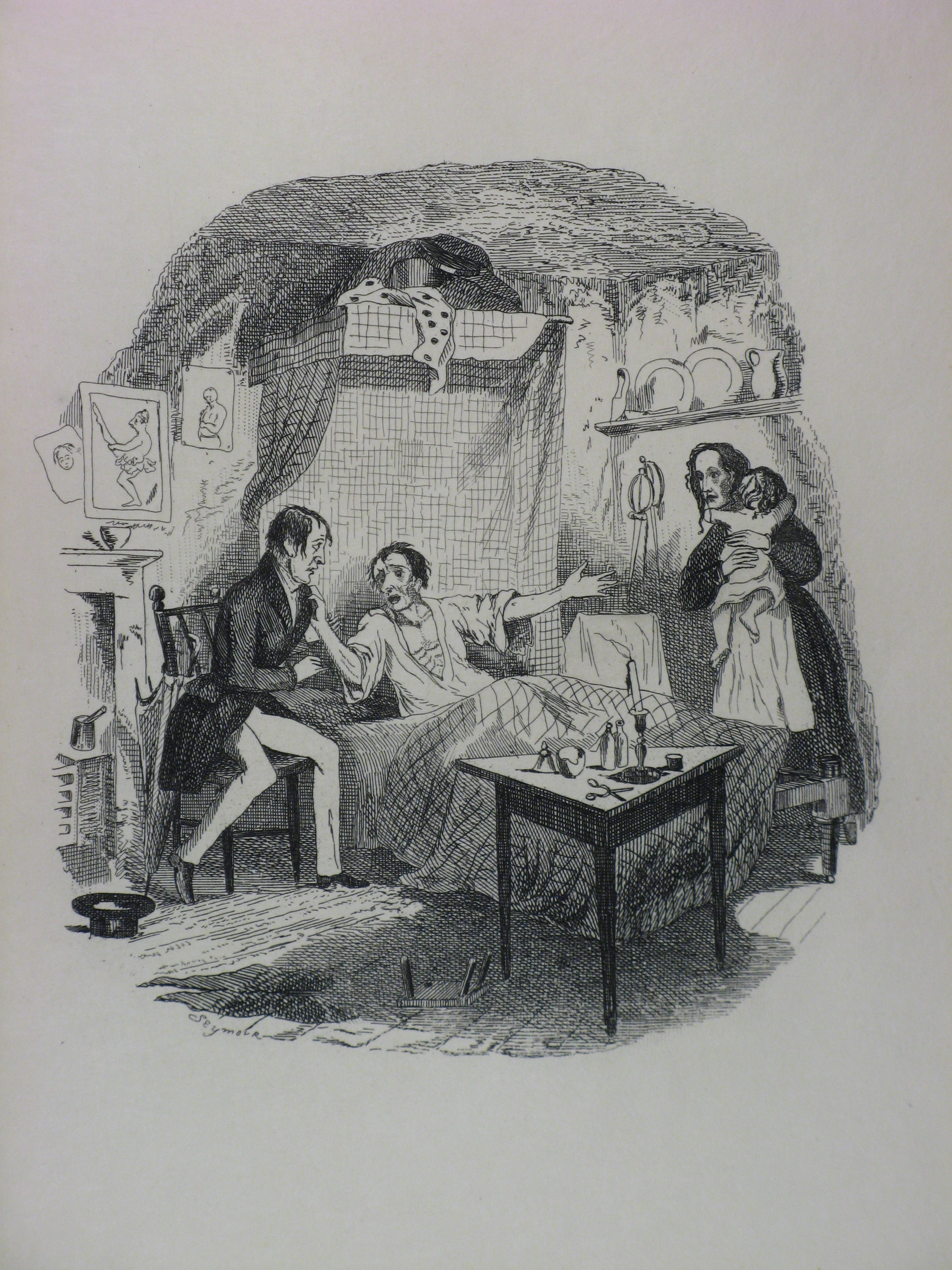
The Dying Clown

Seymour died on 20 April 1836, aged 37 or 38, at home in Islington. He was found early that morning by his kitchen maid lying in the garden behind his summer house, killed by a gunshot wound to the chest. His fowling piece, a muzzle-loading shotgun, was found close by, as was a brief letter, unsigned and unaddressed, which was taken to be a suicide note. As reported by The Times of 22 April and The Reformer of 25 April, a coronial inquest the next day found that Seymour had taken his own life while temporarily deranged. Four decades later, illustrator Robert William Buss stated, incorrectly, that Seymour had shot himself in the head. Buss may have taken this from an erroneous report in the weekly sporting newspaper Bell's Life in London that appeared some days after Seymour's death.

Three days earlier, Seymour had called at Dickens's lodgings at Furnival's Inn, Holborn, and they had discussed the artwork for the chapter on the dying clown story. They had a few drinks (grog) then disagreed, after which Seymour left.

It was later claimed that, in a fit of madness, Seymour then burned all his correspondence relating to The Pickwick Papers. This was repudiated by Frederick Kitton in his 1901 reprint of Mrs Jane Seymour's Origins of the Pickwick Papers, in which he revealed that Dickens wrote two letters to Seymour and both survived within the Seymour family. Seymour's son Robert sold one of these letters, the often quoted Dickens missive criticising Seymour's drawing of 'The Dying Clown', via auction at Sotheby's in 1889.

On the afternoon of the day Seymour died, publisher Edward Chapman collected the re-etched plate for "The Dying Clown" (pictured) and other etchings for the second Pickwick instalment from Seymour's home. Dickens's and Edward Chapman's statements of the incident, (albeit without explanation of how they knew) state that Seymour worked on the new plates well into that night and was found shot the next day. Dickens's statement, among others, mentions that he read about the incident in the morning papers.

When, some years later, Chapman re-issued the by now best-seller The Pickwick Papers in a new book edition, he included a disclaimer statement from Dickens stating; "Mr. Seymour never originated or suggested an incident, a phrase, or a word to be found in this book. Mr. Seymour died when only twenty-four pages of this book were published, and when assuredly not forty-eight were written"; that "All of the input from the artist was in response to the words that had already been written"; and, in continuation of the à Beckett smears, "that he took his own life through jealousy, as it was well known that Seymour's sanity had been questioned." That questioning of Seymour's sanity took the form of Gilbert a' Beckett's jibes against Seymour in the 20 September 1834 issue of Figaro, under the headline of 'Seymour's Insanity'. In a supposed apology on 15 November, a' Beckett wrote, "It is not true that Seymour has gone out of his mind, because he never had any to go out of."

Seymour's widow Jane Seymour contested Dickens's claims for the rest of her life, in letters to the press and in her 1866 pamphlet An Account of the Origins of the 'Pickwick Papers.' She was adamant that her husband had created Samuel Pickwick as early as five years before Dickens was approached to write the text to Seymour's illustrations, and that Robert Seymour had originated The Pickwick Papers in 1835, well before Dickens was approached, to the extent that Seymour had already given the project its full title and passed that along to Chapman and Hall in December, 1835, and had earlier that year engraved the first four Pickwick illustrations ready for publication.

At the inquest, the post mortem report presented to the coroner showed that the shotgun blast had shattered Seymour's heart. The coroner heard that Seymour had been 'perplexed' in the days leading up to his death, which the witness put down to pressure of work, as Seymour was in great demand with publishers. Those publishers included William Kidd, who was waiting for Seymour to commence the second edition of the successful 1835-1836 Odd Volume with his friend George Cruikshank, who wrote that he had allowed Seymour to take the lead on the project due to his 'far superior talent' (see Cruikshank's quote below from the preface of the first Odd Volume). No other testimony suggesting a troubled mental state past or present was produced at the inquest, which also heard that Seymour was comfortably off and had no money worries.

Irish journalist Shelton Mackenzie was clearly unaware of this evidence presented to the coroner in 1836, because in his 1870 biography of Charles Dickens, published in Philadelphia, Mackenzie claimed that Seymour had been in poor health at the time of his death as a result of poverty, poor habits and a supposed inability to resist the temptation of drink. Mackenzie, who never knew Seymour and had been based in Liverpool prior to moving to the USA, offered no source for these claims. As the artist's inquest heard, Seymour was far from impoverished and the state of his physical health was not called into question. In addition, not a single source before or after his death spoke of Seymour having a drinking problem.

In a continuation of Mackenzie's slurs, it would be claimed in the late nineteenth century that Seymour had a 'dark' personality and his death came after a struggle with mental illness and a breakdown in 1830. Seymour had in fact suffered a serious physical illness in 1830 and recovered in the country, while there is no record of him ever suffering from mental illness or being a 'dark' depressive. His inquest was told he was beloved by all, and ten days after his death, in a leaf dated 27 April 1836 that was inserted in the second number of The Pickwick Papers and lamented Seymour's death, Chapman and Hall described Seymour as always amiable.

Seymour was buried at the church of St Mary Magdalene, Holloway.

== Pickwick illustrations ==
- Frontispiece
- Mr Pickwick addresses the Club. – Chapter 1, Issue 1 (31 March 1836)
- The Pugnacious Cabman. Chapter 2, Issue 1 (31 March 1836)
- The Sagacious Dog. Chapter 2, Issue 1 (31 March 1836)
- Dr Slammers's Defiance of Jingle. Chapter 2, Issue 1 (31 March 1836)
- The Dying Clown. Chapter 3, Issue 2 (31 March 1836)
- Mr Pickwick in Chase of his Hat. Chapter 4, Issue 2, (30 April 1836)
- Mr Winkle Soothes the Refractory Steed. Chapter 5, Issue 2 (30 April 1836)
- The Pickwickians in Wardle's Kitchen. For Chapter 5, Issue 2 (30 April 1836)(Unpublished but a copy included in the Pictorial Pickwickiana, Ed Joseph Grego, 1899) See Additional Notes on this.

== Artworks and book illustrations ==
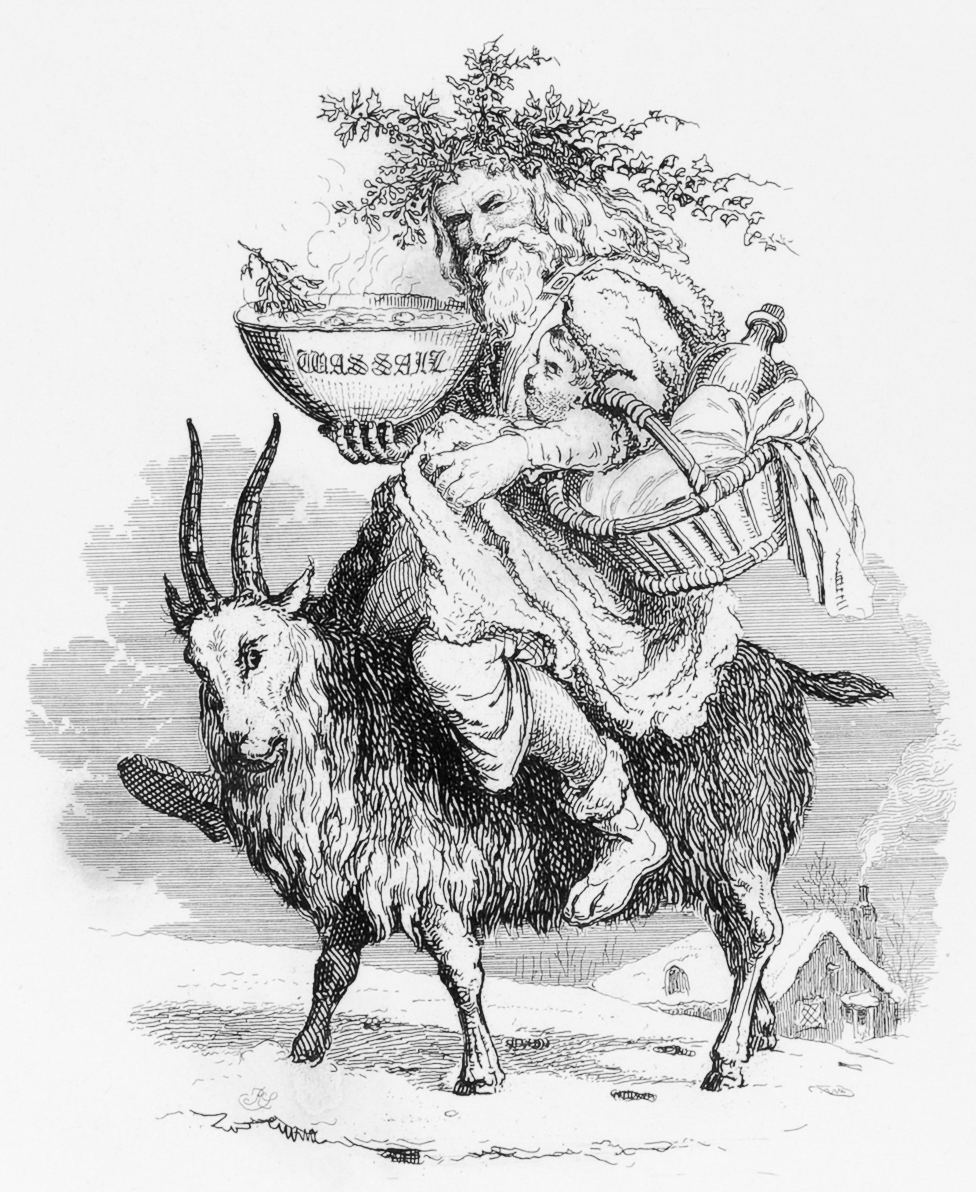
Old Christmas, an illustration for The Book of Christmas by Thomas Kibble Hervey

- Tasso's Jerusalem Delivered (Royal Academy; 1821)
- Figaro in London (300 illustrations):
- Bells Life in London
- Hoods Comic Almanacs
- The Looking Glass (1830–36):
- The History of Enfield (2 vols; 1823)
- Public Characters of all Nations (3 vols; 1823)
- Le Diable boiteux (1824)
- My Uncle Timothy (1825)
- Snatches from Oblivion
- The March of Intellect (1828–30)
- W.A.R: a Masque
- Vagaries in the Quest of the Wild and Wonderful
- The Heiress
- The Omnibus
- Seymour's Sporting Sketches
- The Book of Christmas (1836) by Thomas Kibble Hervey (36 designs)
- New Readings (1830–35)
- Journal of a Landsman from Portsmouth to Lisbon, on Board His Majesty's Ship (1831)
- Maxims and Hints for an Angler (1833)
- The Comic Album (The Bloomsbury Christening; Dickens) (1834)
- The Squib Annual of Poetry, Politics, and Personalities (1835–36)
- Humorous Sketches (1834–36)
- Sketches by Seymour (1834–36)
- Library of Fiction
- The Nimrod Club (1835–36)
- The Posthumous Papers of the Pickwick Club (1836)

== Royal Academy ==
Tasso's Jerusalem Delivered. Royal Academy (1822). by Robert Seymour.

"The Christians deterred by the terrors of enchantment, from felling timber to construct their machines of annoyance.

—And three succeeding days
The boldest warriors, urged by thirst of praise,
Assayed the dreary wood, but struck with dread,
Each knight by turns the threat'ning terror fled".

[Jerusalem Delivered, Book 13th.]

== Jane Seymour to Charles Dickens ==
"His conduct calls to mind the lines put into Satan's mind by Milton".

"Get Riches first, get Wealth, and Treasure heap,

Not difficult, if thou hearken to me:

Riches are mine, Fortune is in my hand;

They whom I favour thrive in Wealth amain,

While Virtue, Valour, Wisdom sit in want."

(Paradise Regained.)

== Obituary notices ==
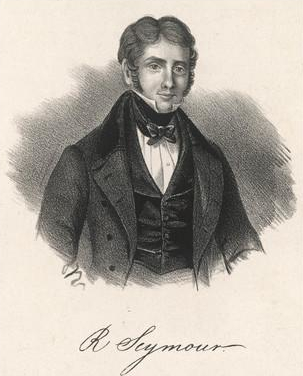
Robert Seymour c. 1836

"The success of the Pickwick Papers was due more to the artists pencil than the author's pen; it is not generally known that the poor Seymour conceived the characters of Sam Weller and Pickwick before a line of the work was written". [The Sun, 1836].

"Seymour first furnished the idea of Pickwick Papers. Mr. Dickens wrote the first numbers to his plates. / Seymour was one of the greatest artists since the days of Hogarth" (1697–1764). [Franklins Miscellany, 1836].

"The head of the production of two clever artists …the one, a long established favourite; the other, Mr. Seymour, a gentleman of far superior talent. Mr. Seymour will have the management of all future volumes, so far as the engravings are concerned". [George Cruikshank in The Odd Volume, or, Book of Variety, 1836].

== Seymour's tombstone ==
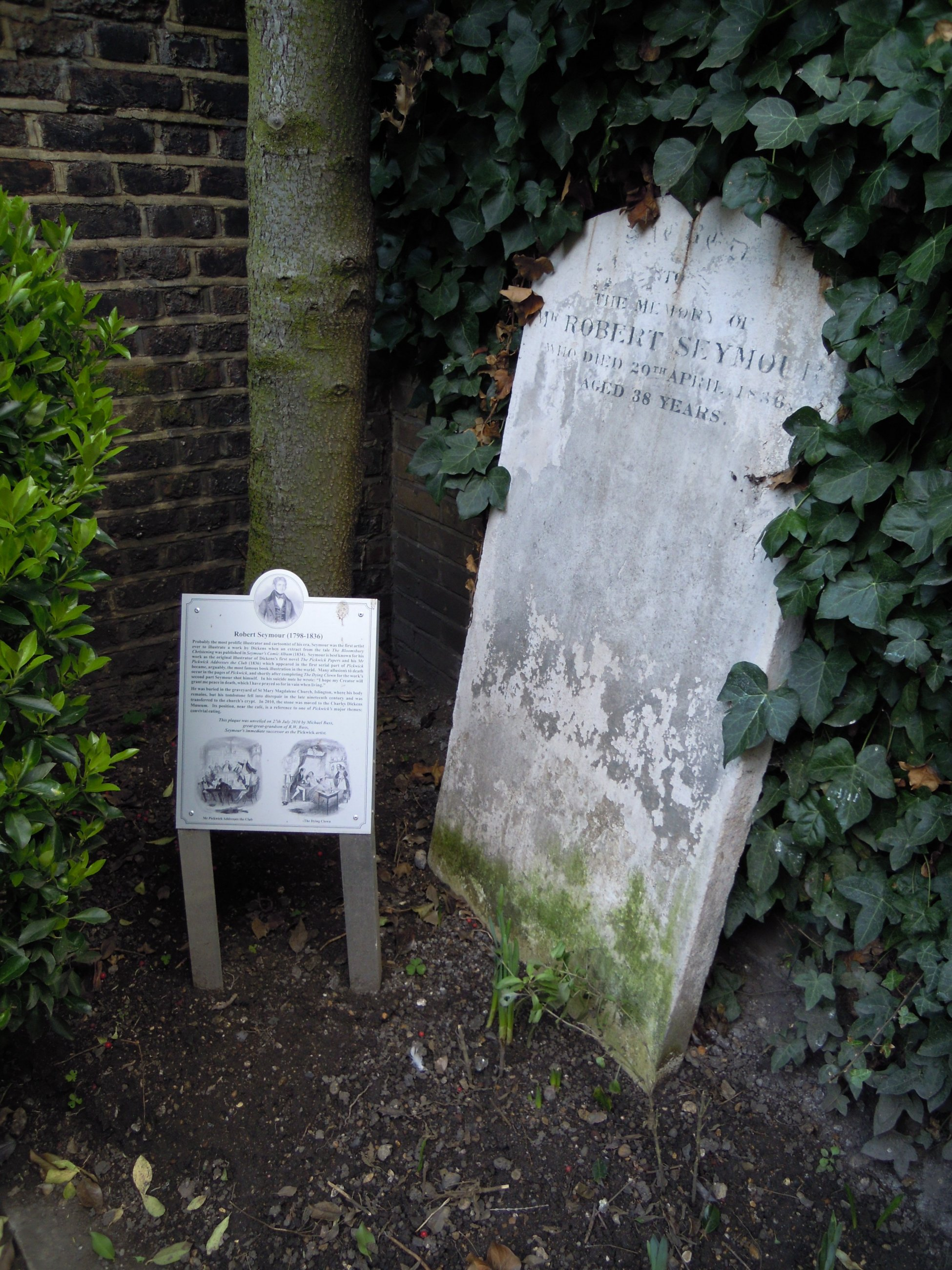
Seymour's headstone at the Charles Dickens Museum

Seymour was buried in 1836 at St Mary Magdalene Church in Islington. Alterations to the church grounds led to Seymour's tombstone being removed from the grave site and considered "lost" until 2006 when it was discovered in the church's crypt by author Stephen Jarvis. The tombstone has since been acquired by the Charles Dickens Museum at 48 Doughty Street, London, where it went on permanent public display from 27 July 2010.

== Death and Mr Pickwick ==
In his 2014 novel Death and Mr Pickwick, which is part dramatised fictional biography of Seymour, part forensic analysis of the "authorial" controversy, part socio-literary history of the entire Pickwick phenomenon, Stephen Jarvis puts together a substantial case against Dickens's and Chapman's accepted version of events. This is plausibly based on inconsistencies in Dickens's various prefaces to the book and flaws in Chapman's supporting testimony, as well as a scrupulous examination of other evidential sources, including internal evidence from Seymour's own work on the project. In particular, the idea that he ever suggested a "Nimrod Club" publication, based on sporting illustrations, comes under strong scrutiny: Jarvis's narrator concludes that not only the idea, but also the name, physiognomy and character of Mr Pickwick originated in Seymour's imagination.
