= Spencer Hall =

English librarian

Spencer Hall (6 November 1805 – 21 August 1875) was librarian of the Athenaeum Club, London.

== Life ==
Hall was born in London in 1805, son of John Hall and his wife Elizabeth. His brother William Hall was a founder of the publisher Chapman and Hall.

He was articled to John Booth, bookseller, of Duke Street, Portman Square, London. He lived a short time in Germany, and was afterwards with Hodges and Smith of Dublin. He was appointed librarian of the Athenaeum Club in 1833, on the recommendation of his relative Edward Magrath, who succeeded Michael Faraday as the first secretary of the club. The members had been only three years in possession of their house in Pall Mall, so that Hall was connected with the early organization of the library.

He issued a pamphlet on the classification of the library in 1858, followed three years later by a letter to John Murray suggesting an edition of Shakespeare with literary criticisms. Hall's other publications were mainly of an antiquarian character. He was elected a fellow of the Society of Antiquaries in 1858.

Under his management the library of the Athenæum Club gradually became one of the choicest collections of books of reference in London. He retired after forty-two years' service, owing to failing health, in May 1875, when he was elected an honorary member of the club and voted a pension. Hall died on 21 August 1875 at Tunbridge Wells, in his seventieth year. His own library was sold by Sothebys on 26 June 1876.

== Publications ==
Hall published:

- "Echyngham of Echyngham" (1850)
- "Notices of Sepulchral Memorials at Etchingham, Sussex, and of the Church at that Place" (1851)
- "Documents from Simancas relating to the Reign of Elizabeth (1558–68); translated from the Spanish of Don Tomás Gonzalez, and edited with Notes and an Introduction"(1865)
- "Francesca da Rimini" (privately printed, 1874; translated from the "Inferno" of Dante, canto v.)

He contributed to The Archaeological Journal, to the Proceedings of the Society of Antiquaries, as well as to The Art Journal and other periodicals.
