= Edward Chapman (publisher) =

Chapman, Edward (1804–1880), bookseller and publisher

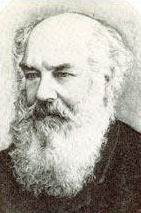
Edward Chapman

Edward Chapman (13 January 1804 – 20 February 1880) was a British publisher who, with William Hall founded Chapman & Hall, publishers for Charles Dickens (from 1840 until 1844 and again from 1858 until 1870), William Thackeray, Robert Browning, Elizabeth Barrett Browning, Anthony Trollope, Eadweard Muybridge and Evelyn Waugh among others.

== Early life ==
Born in 1804, Edward Chapman was one of nine children in a family of six sons and three daughters of Thomas Chapman (1771–1833), a Richmond solicitor and his wife, Sophia (née Barrett, c.1776-1852). While his brothers followed careers in the Law, medicine, surveying, and engineering, Edward Chapman had “a taste for books, and a meditative, studious mind, and with books he chose to make his life”. With William Hall (1800-1847) he founded a bookselling and publishing business at 186 Strand, London in 1830, having bought out a small journal called Chat Of The Week. Chapman is thought to have had the literary skills to be able to spot a saleable book while Hall had the business acumen to sell it. According to Robert L. Patten by 1835 they were publishing illustrated fiction and magazines issued weekly or monthly. Arthur Waugh, later the Chairman of Chapman & Hall, described Chapman as "a quiet and retiring man.... full of information, and had such a broad, just mind that it was a great privilege to hear his judgment upon any subject."

== Charles Dickens ==
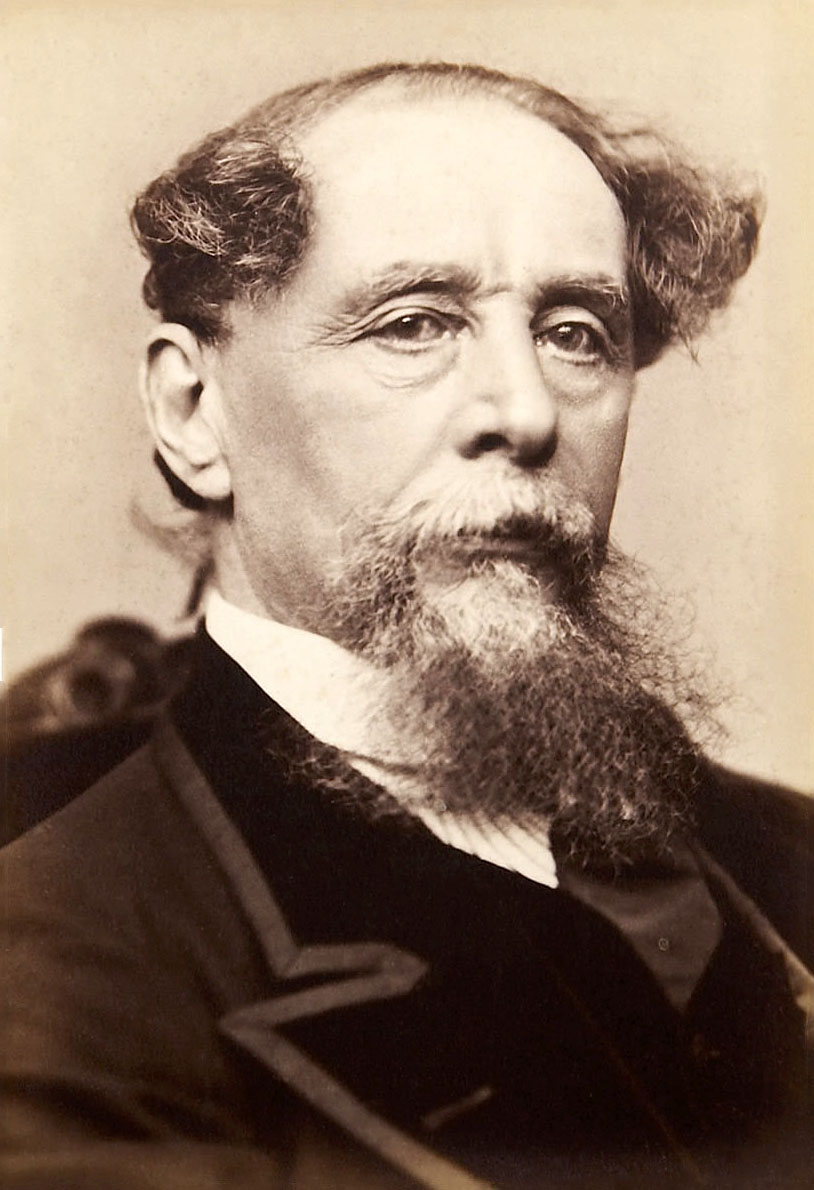
Chapman & Hall published Charles Dickens for much of his career

In 1835 Chapman and Hall published Squib Annual of Poetry, Politics, and Personalities by the illustrator Robert Seymour. In 1836 Seymour proposed to William Hall that Chapman & Hall should publish a series of sporting illustrations by Seymour with short written sketches linking them together in some way. Further he developed the idea of a 'Nimrod Club' of sporting people having adventures as the framework for the sketches and illustrations. Chapman agreed that the work should be issued in monthly parts, with descriptive text by Charles Dickens. However, Dickens, then only 22, was not the first choice as writer. Charles Whitehead, the senior editor in the publishing house, did not have time to complete the work so recommended Dickens on the basis of his recently published and successful Sketches by Boz, also in a monthly periodical format. Eventually, this became The Pickwick Papers, and concerned the adventures of Samuel Pickwick and his friends. In May 1837 The Pickwick Papers sold over 20,000 copies and Hall sent Dickens a cheque for £500 as a bonus above the agreed payment. By the end of its monthly publications Pickwick was selling over 40,000 copies a month and Dickens received a further £2,000 bonus with Chapman & Hall making about £14,000 from the publication.

== Marriage ==
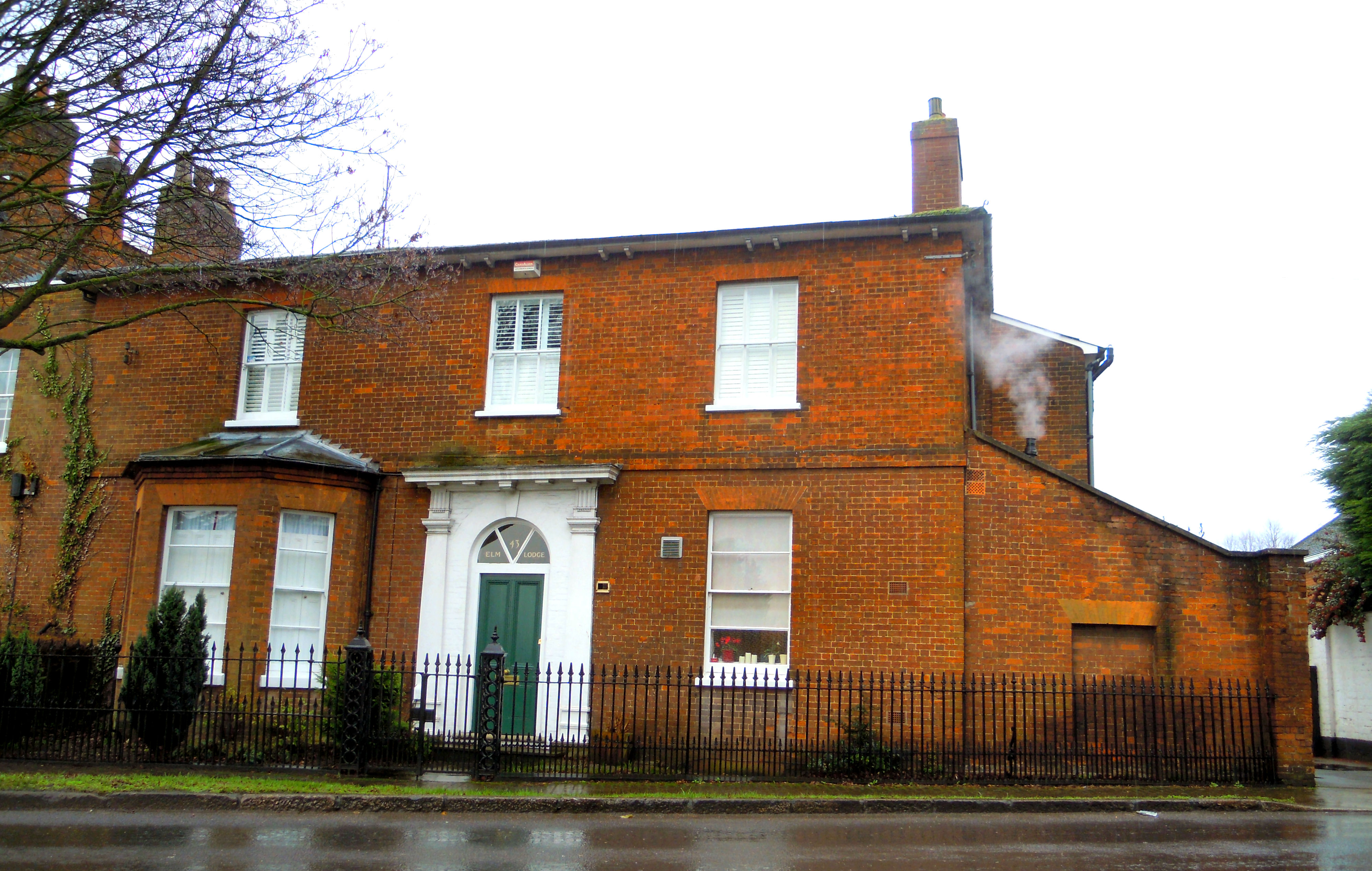
Chapman died at Elm Lodge in Hitchin in 1880

When visiting his uncle Michael Chapman in Cork Street in Hitchin in Hertfordshire Chapman noticed Mary Whiting (c.1814-1875), the daughter of his uncle's neighbour in her garden. He fell in love with her, but coming from a strict Quaker family she was forbidden to communicate with him. Chapman therefore drilled a hole through a wall into the neighbours' spare bedroom through which he passed notes and talked to her. Returning his feelings and refusing to submit to her parents' authority Mary Whiting left her home and went to her brother Thomas Whiting's house in Leeds, where she and Chapman were married on 22 September 1841. In 1842 they moved into a house on the Old Brompton Road where they had three children: Margaret “Meta” Sophia (afterwards Simpson, later Gaye, 1842–1933), Florence (afterwards Roeder, b. 1845), and Reginald Forster (b. 1849). Also in 1841 he hired his 18-year-old cousin Frederic Chapman (1823–95) as a clerk. Edward Chapman's relationship with Robert Browning and Elizabeth Barrett Browning began in 1848 when, like Thomas Carlyle and Edward Bulwer-Lytton, Robert Browning's works were brought to Chapman & Hall by his friend John Forster.

== Later career ==
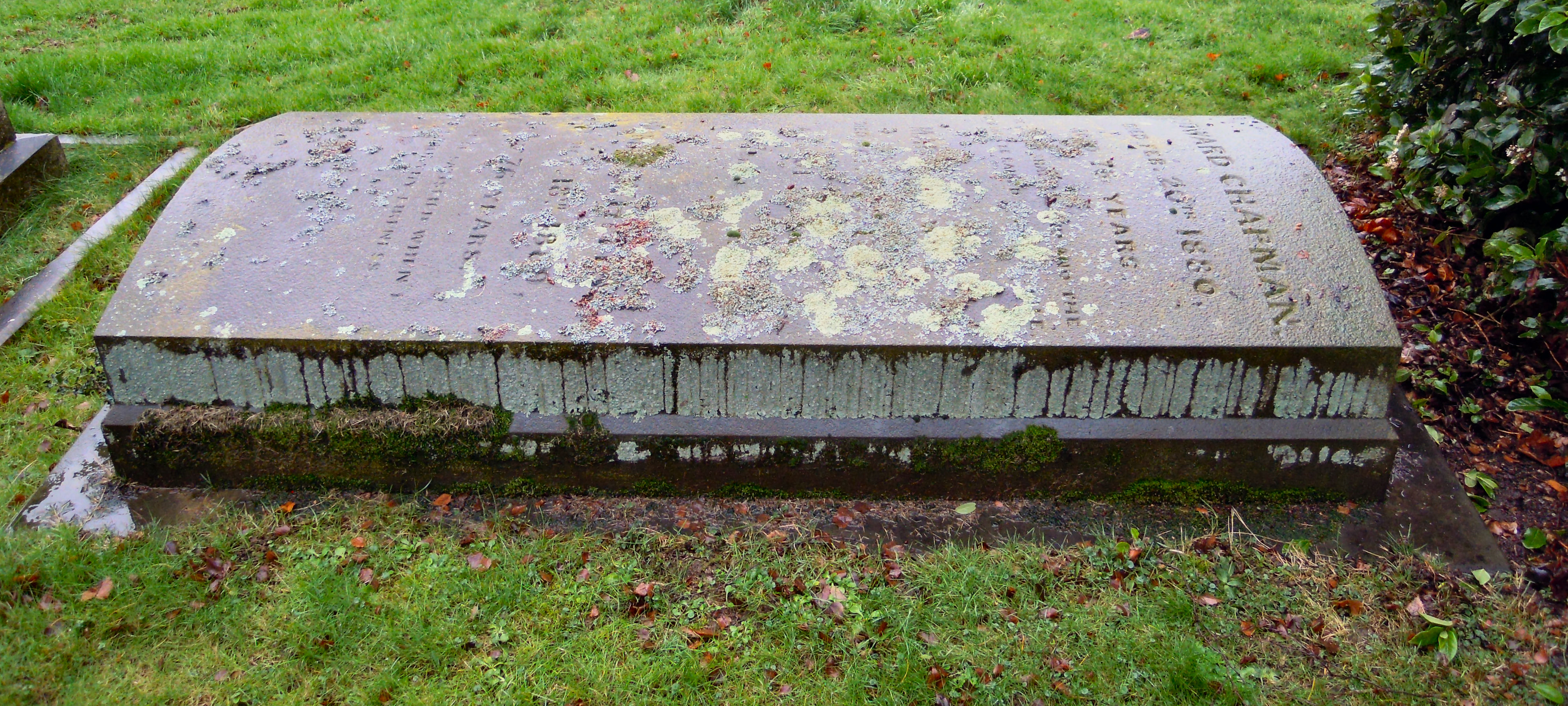
Chapman's grave in Hitchin Cemetery

Chapman's daughter Meta recalled in her eighty-eighth year that she ‘used to wonder what he did at the office as when ever Mama took me to 193 Piccadilly, Papa was standing with his back to the fire’.

On the death of Edward Hall in 1847 Chapman's cousin Frederic Chapman began his progress through the ranks of the company and eventually becoming a partner in 1858 and sole proprietor on Edward Chapman's retirement from Chapman & Hall in 1866. (Note: Although it has often been stated that Edward Chapman retired from Chapman & Hall in 1864, there are two letters indicating he remained an active partner until early 1866. In a 19 January 1866 letter to Frederic Ouvry, Charles Dickens wrote: “I saw Edward Chapman, the retiring partner this morning. ... I pointed out to him the objections that I had to his cousin’s remaining in the business alone” (The Letters of Charles Dickens, ed. M. House, G. Storey, et al. (Oxford, 1965–2002) 11, 142). On 5 February 1866 Forster wrote to Robert Bulwer Lytton that “Fredric Chapman ... is about to buy out the elder Chapman, and to conduct the business alone” (ms with Lord Cobbold, Knebworth, England. On deposit at Hertfordshire Archives and Local Studies, Hertford)) He spent the next decade travelling throughout Europe before his poor health forced him to return to his home at Royal Tunbridge Wells before moving to Elm Lodge in Hitchin in Hertfordshire, where he and his wife had family.

Edward Chapman died at Elm Lodge in Hitchin in 1880 and is buried with his wife and brother-in-law Thomas Whiting in Hitchin Cemetery.

== In popular culture ==
Ian McNeice portrays Chapman in the 2017 film, The Man Who Invented Christmas, which tells the story of the writing and production of Charles Dickens' 1843 novella A Christmas Carol.
