= Eleanora Louisa Hervey =

British author (1811–1903)

- Born: Eleanora Louisa Montagu; 16 November 1811; Liverpool
- Died: 27 October 1903 (aged 91)
- Occupation: Writer
- Spouse(s): Thomas Kibble Hervey

Eleanora Louisa Montagu Hervey (16 November 1811 – 27 October 1903) was a British poet, novelist, and travel writer.

Eleanora Louisa Hervey was born on 16 November 1811 in Liverpool, the daughter of George Conway Courtenay Montagu, son of the ornithologist George Montagu, and Margaret Green Wilkson. In 1843, she married poet and editor Thomas Kibble Hervey.

Beginning in the 1830s she became a regular contributor of poetry to periodicals including Churchman's Family Magazine, Chambers's, Athenaeum, Once a Week, Ladies' Companion, and Illustrated London News, She was one of the many poets mentioned in Leigh Hunt's "Blue-Stocking Revels; or, the Feast of the Violets". Her collection of interconnected stories, The Feasts of Camelot, with the Tales that were Told There (1863), is one of the earliest original works of fiction based on the Arthurian legends that was written by a woman.

Eleanora Louisa Hervey died on 27 October 1903.

== Bibliography ==
- The Bard of the Sea Kings, a Legend of Kingley-Vale, and other Poems. London, 1833.
- Edith of Greystock: A Poem. London: Henry Lindsell, 1833.
- The Landgrave: A Play in Five Acts. London: Smith, Elder, & Co., 1839.
- The Pathway of the Fawn. London, 1852.
- Adventures in Tartary, China, and Kashmir, London, 1853, 3 vols.
- The Feasts of Camelot, with the Tales that were Told There. 1 vol. London: Bell and Daldy, 1863.
- Snooded Jessaline: or, The Honour of a House. 3 vol. London: Saunders and Otley, 1865.
- New Stories and Old Legends. Illust. London, 1868
- Our Legends and Lives: a Gift for All Seasons, London, 1869
- The Rock Light: or, Duty our Watchword. 1 vol. London: Frederick Warne, 1871.
- Rest on the Cross. London, 1877.
- The Children of the Pear-Garden and Their Stories. 1 vol. London: Frederick Warne, 1878.
- My Godmother's Stories from Many Lands. 1 vol. London: R. Washbourne, 1877.
