= Figaro in London =

Figaro in London was an English comic paper of the early nineteenth century. Founded as a weekly on 10 December 1831, it ran until 31 December 1838.

== The French connection ==
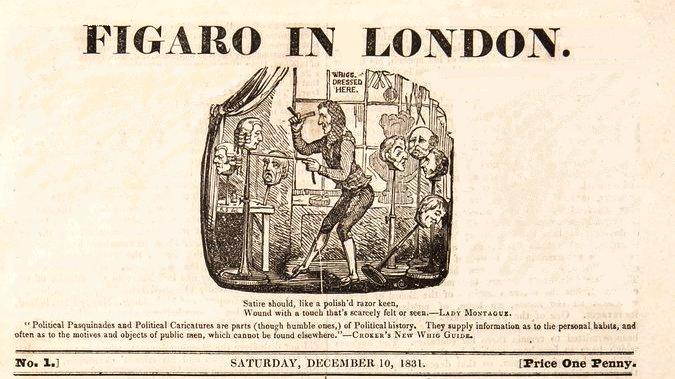
The standard format heading of Figaro in London designed by Robert Seymour

The paper's original editor was Gilbert Abbott à Beckett and it was mostly written by him, then by Henry Mayhew, who took over as editor between 1835 and 1836, after which à Beckett took over again. The reason for the choice of name was announced in the opening editorial as building on the success of the French satirical daily Le Figaro, founded five years before. The allusion there had been to the hero of Pierre-Augustin Caron de Beaumarchais' play, Le Mariage de Figaro, which poked fun at privilege. The preface to the first collected volume congratulated itself on the fact that “Ever since we made our first appearance in London, England, we have been Figaro here! Figaro there! Figaro everywhere! We did not presume to hope for a more favourable reception than our prototype in Paris, but we have the flattering satisfaction of knowing, by a return lately made of the French newspapers, that Figaro in London sells more than four times the number of its namesake in the French capital.” At its peak, the circulation ran at 70,000 copies.

The weekly paper's format comprised four double-columned sheets, priced one penny, with political comment, society gossip, verses and theatre reviews as regular features. Under the title at the head of every issue there appeared a woodprint of a barber (which was Figaro's profession) attacking one of several effigy heads (block heads, that is to say) mounted on stands. Beneath this was, as the paper's motto, the lines by Lady Mary Wortley Montagu: "Satire should, like a polish’d razor keen, Wound with a touch that’s scarcely felt or seen." Its publication was followed by a swarm of ephemeral imitators. In a review of these, the surviving Figaro in London was described in an article in The Mechanics Magazine as "a political squib which obtained a large circulation during the Reform excitement. Its chief attraction consists in the caricatures designed by Robert Seymour in a style of broad humour."

The imitators usually lasted no more than a few months and often adapted the paper's title. Thus there appeared a Figaro in Bristol, as in Birmingham, Chesterfield, Sheffield and Liverpool. In the context of the 1832 cholera outbreak, à Beckett identified all this as the new disease of Figaromania and gleefully set himself to record the fatalities. In his issue 12 (25 February 1832), he noted the deaths of Figaro in Birmingham, The Critical Figaro and The English Figaro, and also reported “3 new cases, all very desperate and almost certain to be included next week among the deaths”. A few rare papers survived longer, however, including Figaro in Sheffield (1832-8) and Figaro in Wales (1835-6).

As well as the bound sets of yearly numbers, there were a number of spin-offs under à Beckett's enterprising editorship. There were firstly the four volumes of the Comic Magazine in which illustrations by Seymour figured prominently, along with articles and poems, several items of which were taken from Figaro in London. There was also Sycophant saints and sabbath sinners, a satire (1833), a 32-page shilling pamphlet aimed at the editor's next victim, Sir Albert Agnew's attempt to introduce a bill on sabbath observance through Parliament.

After the paper closed, Henry Mayhew, went on to co-found the more long-lasting Punch, of which Figaro in London may be considered a forerunner. In 1870 a satirical daily named the London Figaro was founded but soon changed direction to become a general interest weekly.
