= Master Humphrey's Clock =

1840-1841 weekly periodical edited and written by Charles Dickens

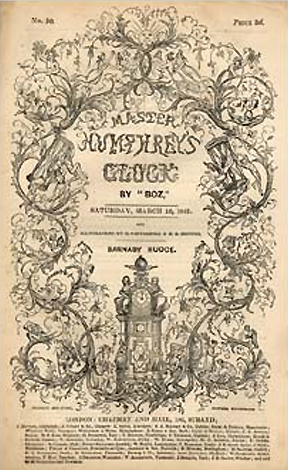
- Cover, first edition of Master Humphrey's Clock, 1840
- Author: Editor: Charles Dickens ("Boz")
- Illustrator: George Cattermole; Hablot Knight Browne (Phiz); Samuel Williams; Daniel Maclise
- Cover artist: George Cattermole
- Language: English
- Series: Weekly: 4 April 1840 – 4 December 1841
- Genre: Fiction Social criticism
- Publisher: Chapman & Hall
- Publication date: 1840
- Publication place: England
- Media type: Print (Serial)

Master Humphrey's Clock was a weekly periodical edited and written entirely by Charles Dickens and published from 4 April 1840 to 4 December 1841. It began with a frame story in which Master Humphrey tells about himself and his small circle of friends (which includes Mr. Pickwick), and their penchant for telling stories. Several short stories were included, followed by the novels The Old Curiosity Shop and Barnaby Rudge. It is generally thought that Dickens originally intended The Old Curiosity Shop as a short story like the others that had appeared in Master Humphrey's Clock, but after a few chapters decided to extend it into a novel. Master Humphrey appears as the first-person narrator in the first three chapters of The Old Curiosity Shop but then disappears, stating, "And now that I have carried this history so far in my own character and introduced these personages to the reader, I shall for the convenience of the narrative detach myself from its further course, and leave those who have prominent and necessary parts in it to speak and act for themselves."

Master Humphrey is a lonely man who lives in London. He keeps old manuscripts in an antique longcase clock by the chimney-corner. One day, he decides that he would start a little club, called Master Humphrey's Clock, where the members would read out their manuscripts to the others. The members include Master Humphrey; a deaf gentleman; Jack Redburn; retired merchant Owen Miles; and Mr. Pickwick from The Pickwick Papers. A mirror club in the kitchen, Mr. Weller's Watch, run by Mr. Weller, has members including Humphrey's maid, the barber and Sam Weller.

Master Humphrey's Clock appeared after The Old Curiosity Shop, to introduce Barnaby Rudge. After Barnaby Rudge, Master Humphrey is left by himself by the chimney corner in a train of thoughts. Here, the deaf gentleman continues the narration. Later, the deaf gentleman and his friends return to Humphrey's house to find him dead. Humphrey has left money for the barber and the maid (no doubt by traces of love that they would be married). Redburn and the deaf gentleman look after the house and the club closes for good.

In the portion of Master Humphrey's Clock which succeeds The Old Curiosity Shop, Master Humphrey reveals to his friends that he is the character referred to as the 'single gentleman' in that story.

== Story order ==
Master Humphrey's Clock was a weekly serial that contained both short stories and two novels (The Old Curiosity Shop and Barnaby Rudge). Some of the short stories act as frame stories to the novels so the ordering of publication is important.

Although Dickens's original artistic intent was to keep the short stories and the novels together, he himself cancelled Master Humphrey's Clock before 1848, and stated in a preface to The Old Curiosity Shop that he did not wish the story to be tied down to the miscellany where it began. Most later anthologies published the short stories and the novels separately. However, the short stories and the novels were published in 1840 in three bound volumes under the title Master Humphrey's Clock, which retains the full and correct ordering of texts as they originally appeared. The illustrations in these volumes were by George Cattermole and Hablot Browne, better known as "Phiz".

- "Master Humphrey, from His Clock-Side in the Chimney Corner I"
- "The Clock-Case: Introduction to the Giant Chronicles"
- "First Night of the Giant Chronicles"
- "Correspondence I"
- "Master Humphrey, from His Clock-Side in the Chimney Corner II"
- "The Clock-Case: A Confession Found in a Prison in the Time of Charles the Second"
- The Old Curiosity Shop I
- "Correspondence II"
- "Master Humphrey’s Visitor"
- "Mr. Pickwick's Tale I-II"
- "Further Particulars of Master Humphrey’s Visitor"
- "The Clock"
- The Old Curiosity Shop II-IV
- "Mr. Weller’s Watch"
- The Old Curiosity Shop V-VIII
- "Master Humphrey, from His Clock-Side in the Chimney Corner III"
- The Old Curiosity Shop IX-LXXIII
- "Master Humphrey, from His Clock-Side in the Chimney Corner IV"
- Barnaby Rudge I-LXXXII
- "Master Humphrey, from His Clock-Side in the Chimney Corner V"
- "The Deaf Gentleman from His Own Apartment"
