= Thomas Kibble Hervey =

Scottish-born poet and critic

Thomas Kibble Hervey (4 February 1799 – 27 February 1859) was a Scottish-born poet and critic. He rose to be the Editor of the Athenaeum, a leading British literary magazine in the 19th century.

== Youth ==
Thomas Kibble Hervey was born in Paisley, Renfrewshire, Scotland, and brought up in Manchester, England, from 1802 or 1803, where he was educated at Manchester Grammar School. He entered Caius College, Cambridge in 1822, but migrated to Trinity College the following year. He was articled to a firm of Manchester solicitors and studied for the bar, but was not called.

== Literary work ==
While at Cambridge he began a lengthy career as a leading contributor to the Athenaeum in 1828, and published Australia, a Poem (1824) and Prometheus (1832). He later edited Friendship's Offering (1826–1827) and The Amaranth (1839), contributed to annuals, and edited the Athenaeum (23 May 1846 – December 1853). His other works included The Poetical Sketch Book (1829), The Autobiography of Jack Ketch, The Book of Christmas (1836, reprinted as late as 1888 and illustrated by Robert Seymour) and English Helicon (1841).

== Marriage and death ==
On 17 October 1843, Hervey married Eleanora Louisa Montagu (1811–1903), a playwright, author and poet, who was the daughter of George Conway Montagu of Lackham, Wiltshire. The couple had a son, Frederick Robert James.

Hervey died in Haverstock Hill, London, England in 1859 and was buried on the western side of Highgate Cemetery. His grave (no.9443) no longer has a headstone or marker.

An obituary in the Gentlemen's Magazine criticized his work as a reviewer, saying it was "characterized by a causticity of censure and a costiveness of praise, scarcely worthy of a journal of high standing." The Poems of T. K. Hervey was edited by his wife with a memoir (1866).
