= The Pickwick Papers =

1836–1837 novel by Charles Dickens

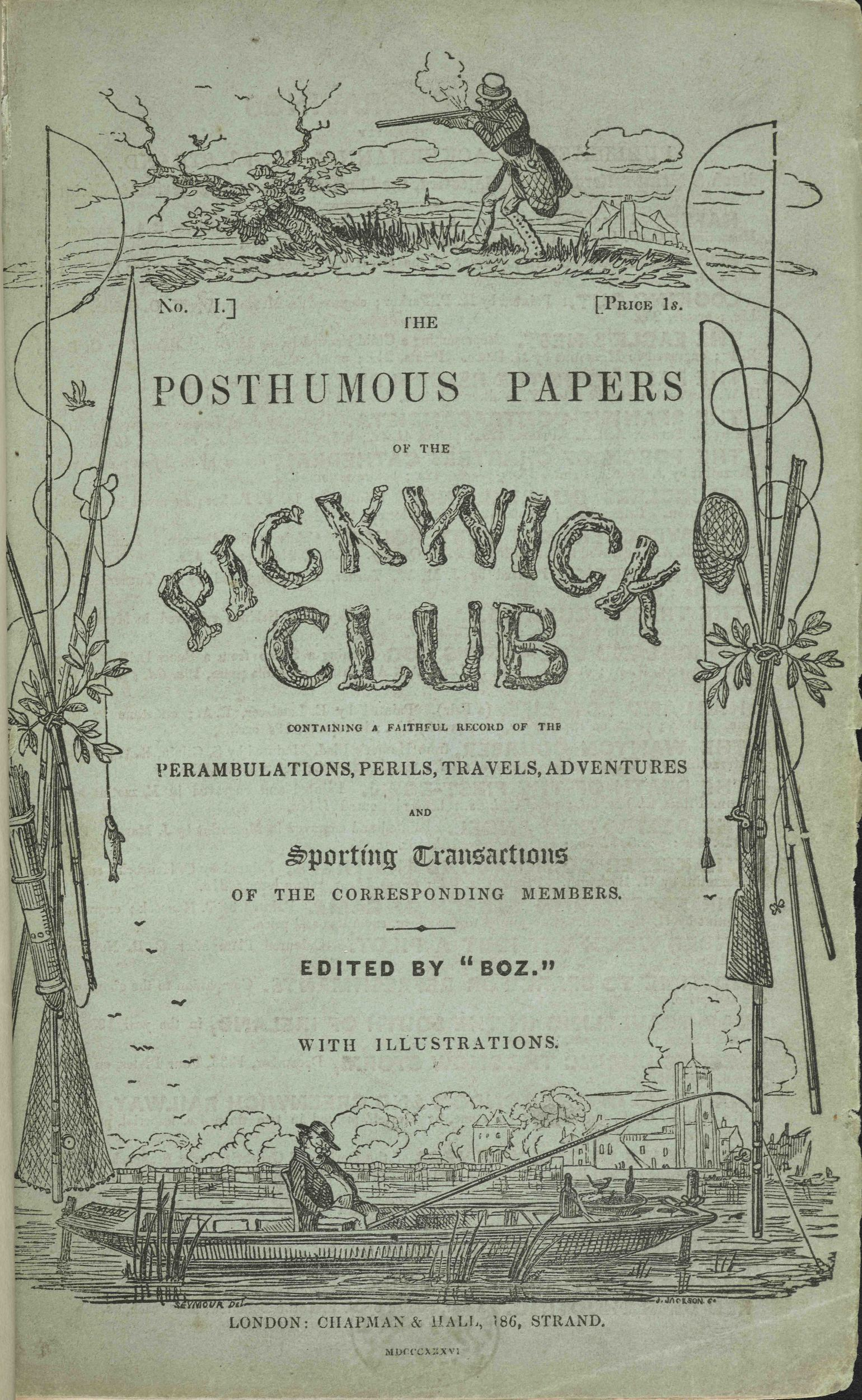
- Original cover issued in 1836
- Author: Charles Dickens ("Boz")
- Original title: The Posthumous Papers of the Pickwick Club, Containing a Faithful Record of the Perambulations, Perils, Travels, Adventures and Sporting Transactions of the Corresponding Members
- Illustrator: Robert Seymour; Robert William Buss; Hablot Knight Browne (Phiz)
- Language: English
- Subject: Travels in the English Countryside
- Genre: Novel
- Published: Serialised March 1836 – November 1837; book format 1837
- Publisher: Chapman & Hall
- Publication place: England
- Media type: Print
- Preceded by: Sketches by Boz
- Followed by: Oliver Twist
- Text: The Pickwick Papers at Wikisource

The Posthumous Papers of the Pickwick Club (also known as The Pickwick Papers) was the first novel by English author Charles Dickens, originally published in serial form from March 1836 to November 1837. Because of his success with Sketches by Boz published in 1836, Dickens was asked by the publisher Chapman & Hall to supply descriptions to explain a series of comic "cockney sporting plates" by illustrator Robert Seymour, and to connect them into a novel. The book became a publishing phenomenon, with bootleg copies, theatrical performances, Sam Weller joke books, and other merchandise. On its cultural impact, Nicholas Dames in The Atlantic writes, "'Literature' is not a big enough category for Pickwick. It defined its own, a new one that we have learned to call 'entertainment'." Published in 19 issues over 20 months, the success of The Pickwick Papers popularised serialised fiction and cliffhanger endings.

Seymour's widow claimed that the idea for the novel was originally her husband's, but Dickens strenuously denied any specific input in his preface to the 1867 edition: "Mr Seymour never originated or suggested an incident, a phrase, or a word, to be found in the book."

== Background ==
Dickens was working as a parliamentary reporter and a roving journalist at the age of 24, and he had published a collection of sketches on London life as Sketches by Boz. Publisher Chapman & Hall was projecting a series of "cockney sporting plates" by illustrator Robert Seymour. There was to be a club, the members of which were to be sent on hunting and fishing expeditions into the country. Their guns were to go off by accident, and fishhooks were to get caught in their hats and trousers, and these and other misadventures were to be depicted in Seymour's comic plates. They asked Dickens to supply the description necessary to explain the plates and to connect them into a sort of picture novel that was fashionable at the time. He protested that he knew nothing of sport, but still accepted the commission.

Only in a few instances did Dickens adjust his narrative to plates that had been prepared for him. Typically, he led the way with an instalment of his story, and the artist was compelled to illustrate what Dickens had already written. The story thus became the prime source of interest and the illustrations merely of secondary importance. Seymour provided the illustrations for the first two instalments before his suicide. Robert William Buss illustrated the third instalment, but Dickens did not like his work, so the remaining instalments were illustrated by Phiz (Hablot Knight Browne), who illustrated most of Dickens's subsequent novels. The instalments were first published in book form in 1837.

== Summary ==
The Pickwick Papers is a sequence of loosely related adventures written for serialization in a periodical. The action is given as occurring 1827–28, though critics have noted some seeming anachronisms. For example, Dickens satirized the case of George Norton suing Lord Melbourne in 1836.

The novel's protagonist Samuel Pickwick, Esquire is a kind and wealthy old gentleman, the founder and perpetual president of the Pickwick Club. Bored with the club's usual sporting activities, he suggests that he and the three other "Pickwickians" should make journeys to places remote from London and compose reports of what they see and experience. Their travels throughout the English countryside by coach provide the chief subject matter of the novel. A romantic misunderstanding with his landlady, the widow Mrs Bardell, results in one of the most famous legal cases in English literature, Bardell v. Pickwick, leading to them both being incarcerated in the Fleet Prison for debt.

Pickwick learns that the only way he can relieve the suffering of Mrs Bardell is by paying her costs in the action against himself, thus at the same time releasing himself from the prison.

== Characters ==
=== Central characters ===
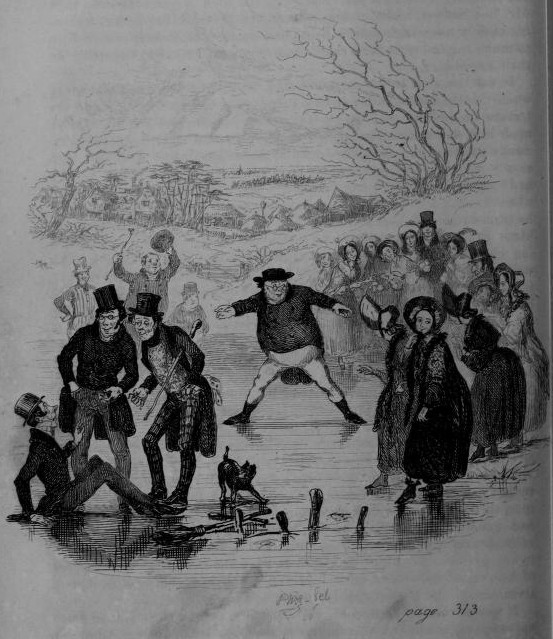
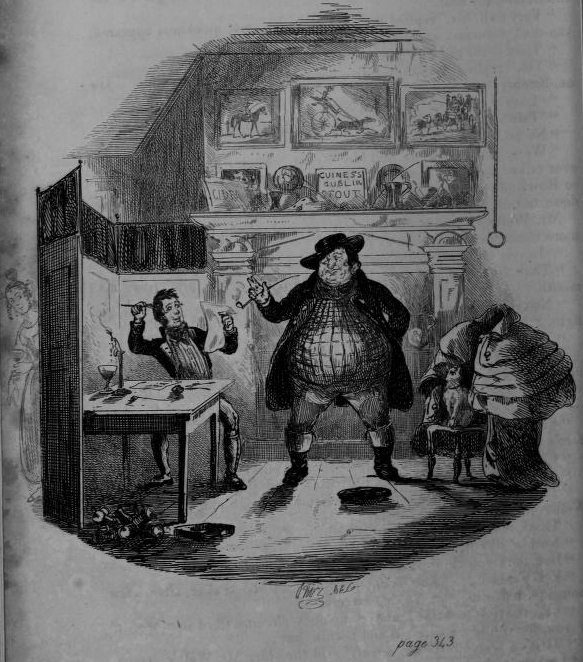
Left: Mr Pickwick sliding on the ice
Right: Sam Weller and his father Tony Weller (The Valentine)

Samuel Pickwick
Protagonist and founder of the Pickwick Club. Following his description in the text, Pickwick is usually portrayed by illustrators as a round-faced, clean-shaven, portly gentleman wearing spectacles.
Nathaniel Winkle
Young friend of Pickwick and his travelling companion. He declares himself a sportsman, though he turns out to be dangerously inept when handling horses and guns.
Augustus Snodgrass
Young friend of Pickwick. He fancies himself a poet, though there is no mention of any of his own poetry in the novel.
Tracy Tupman
The third travelling companion: a fat, middle-aged man who considers himself a romantic lover.
Sam Weller
Mr Pickwick's valet, and a source of idiosyncratic proverbs and advice
Tony Weller
Sam's father, a loquacious coachman
Alfred Jingle
A strolling actor and charlatan, noted for telling bizarre anecdotes in a distinctively extravagant, disjointed style.

=== Supporting characters ===
Joe
A "fat boy" who consumes great quantities of food, and might fall asleep at any time of day, regardless of the situation. Joe's sleep problem is the origin of the medical term Pickwickian syndrome, or obesity hypoventilation syndrome. (Most people with obesity hypoventilation syndrome have concurrent obstructive sleep apnea.)
Job Trotter
Mr Jingle's wily servant, whose true slyness is only ever seen in the first few lines of a scene, before he adopts his usual pretence of meekness
Mr Wardle
Owner of a farm in Dingley Dell; Mr Pickwick's friend. They meet at the military review in Rochester. Joe is his servant.
Rachael Wardle
Mr. Wardle's spinster sister, who tries in vain to elope with the unscrupulous Jingle
Mr Perker
Attorney of Mr Wardle, and later of Mr Pickwick
Serjeant Buzfuz
A fat, red-faced serjeant-at-law who serves as counsel for the plaintiff in the case of Bardell v. Pickwick. A gifted lawyer who uses his sound grasp of rhetoric and mastery of the innate theatricality of court procedure to transmute the slenderest of evidence into an apparently damning case against the innocent Pickwick.
Mary
A "well-shaped female servant" and Sam Weller's "Valentine"
Mrs Martha Bardell
Mr Pickwick's widowed landlady who brings a case against him for breach of promise.
Emily Wardle
One of Mr Wardle's daughters, very fond of Mr Snodgrass
Arabella Allen
Friend of Emily Wardle and sister of Ben Allen. She elopes with Mr Winkle and marries him.
Benjamin "Ben" Allen
Arabella's brother, a dissipated medical student
Robert "Bob" Sawyer
Ben Allen's friend and fellow-student
Mr Stiggins
The deputy shepherd
The avaricious, hypocritical, and alcoholic Nonconformist minister at the United Grand Junction, Ebenezer Temperance Association. He inadvertently causes the death of the second Mrs Weller.

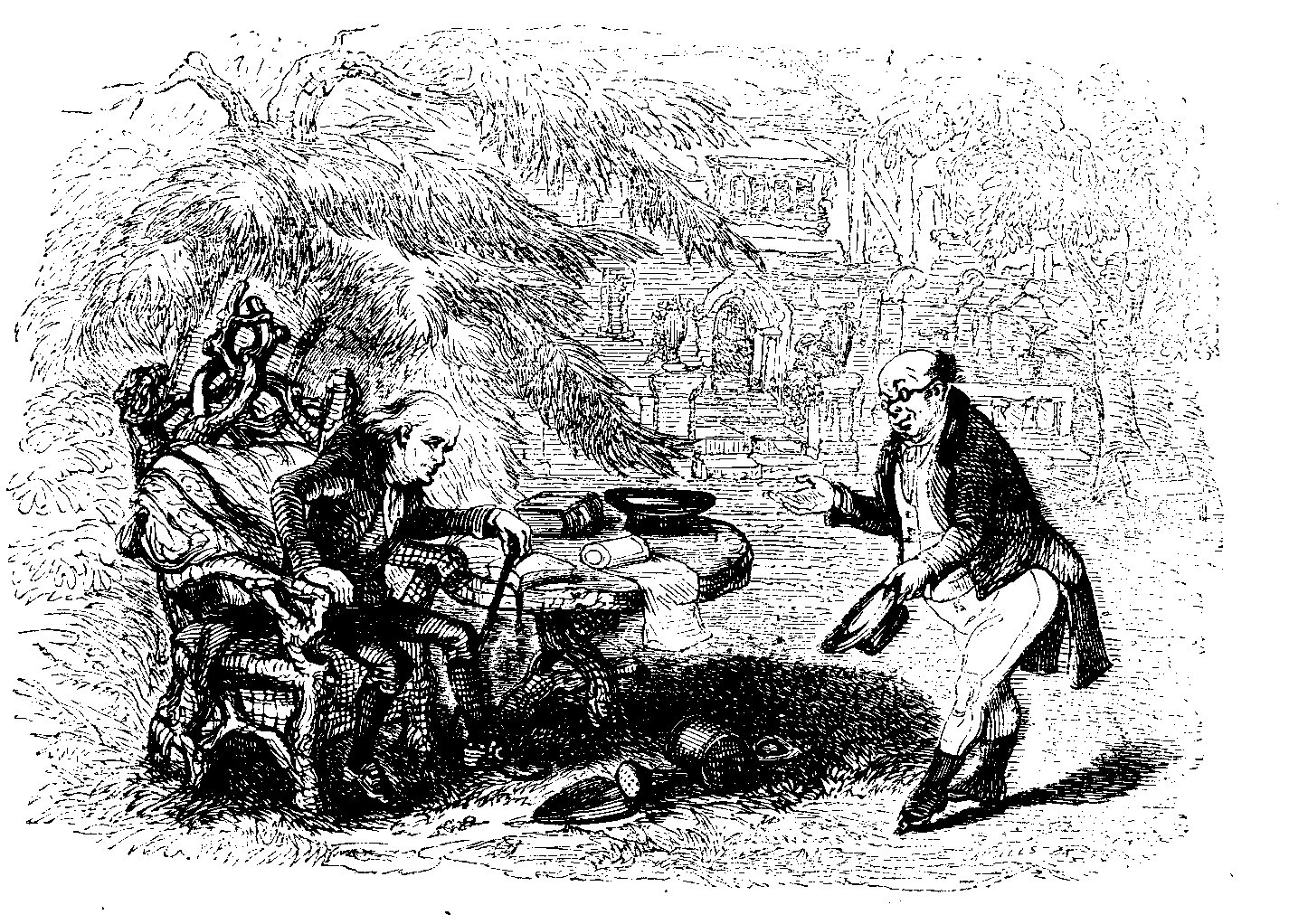
Master Humphrey meets Mr Pickwick, from the Master Humphrey's Clock magazine sequel

== Sequel ==
Pickwick, Sam Weller, and his father Tony briefly reappeared in 1840 in the magazine Master Humphrey's Clock, named after a literary club founded by Mr Humphrey, whose members read out stories to the others. Pickwick is a member, and there is a mirror club in the kitchen, "Mr Weller's Watch", run by Sam Weller.

== Adaptations ==
=== Theatre ===
There was an early attempt at a theatrical adaptation with songs by W.T. Moncrieff and entitled Samuel Weller, or, The Pickwickians, in 1837. This was followed in 1871 by John Hollingshead's stage play Bardell versus Pickwick. The first successful musical was Pickwick (sometimes Pickwick, A Dramatic Cantata) by Sir Francis Burnand and Edward Solomon and premiered at the Comedy Theatre on 7 February 1889.

Pickwick by Cyril Ornadel, Wolf Mankowitz, and Leslie Bricusse was a musical version which premiered in Manchester in 1963 before transferring to the West End. It originally starred Harry Secombe (later cast as Mr Bumble in the film version of Oliver!) in the title role and Roy Castle as Sam Weller. Although it was a major success in London, running for 694 performances, Pickwick failed in the United States when it opened on Broadway in 1965.

Part of The Pickwick Papers were featured in Charles Dickens's Ghost Stories, a 60-minute animation made by Emerald City Films (1987). These included The Ghost in the Wardrobe, The Mail Coach Ghosts, and The Goblin and the Gravedigger.

Stephen Jarvis's novel Death and Mr Pickwick (2014) is in part a literary thriller, examining in minute detail the question of whether the idea, character and physiognomy of Samuel Pickwick originated with Dickens, or with the original illustrator and instigator of the project, Robert Seymour. The conclusion of the narrator is that the accepted version of events given by Dickens and the publisher Edward Chapman is untrue.

=== Other media ===
The novel has been adapted many times to film, radio, and television:

- 1913 – The Pickwick Papers, a silent three-reel film featuring John Bunny as Samuel Pickwick
- 1921 – The Adventures of Mr Pickwick, a silent lost film, starring Frederick Volpe and Hubert Woodward
- 1936 – On 13 November 1936, less than two weeks after the BBC began regularly scheduled television broadcasts, The British Music Drama Opera Company under the direction of Vladimir Rosing presented the world's first televised opera: Pickwick by Albert Coates.
- 1938 – The Pickwick Papers, Orson Welles's 20 November 1938 radio adaptation for Mercury Theater on the Air
- 1952 – starring James Hayter, Nigel Patrick, Alexander Gauge, and Harry Fowler (the first sound film version, and to this day, the only sound version of the story released to cinemas)
- 1968 — BBC Radio 4 produced Bardell v. Pickwick by Charles Dickens, a dramatization by Michael and Mollie Hardwick starring Jim Dale as Sam Weller and Moray Watson as Mr Pickwick
- 1969 — the BBC filmed the London West End musical as a television film Pickwick with Secombe and Castle reprising their stage roles, both the stage and television versions featured the song If I Ruled the World, which became a hit for Secombe and other singers such as Tony Bennett and Sammy Davis Jr.
- 1977 — BBC Radio 4 released a dramatization by Barry Campbell and Constance Cox with Freddie Jones as Mr Pickwick
- 1985 — BBC Television released a 12-part, mini-series running to 350 minutes (almost 6 hours) starring Nigel Stock, Alan Parnaby, Clive Swift, and Patrick Malahide
- 1985 – an animated adaptation
- 1997 — BBC Radio 4 released a dramatization by Martyn Read with Clive Francis as Mr Pickwick.

== Publication ==
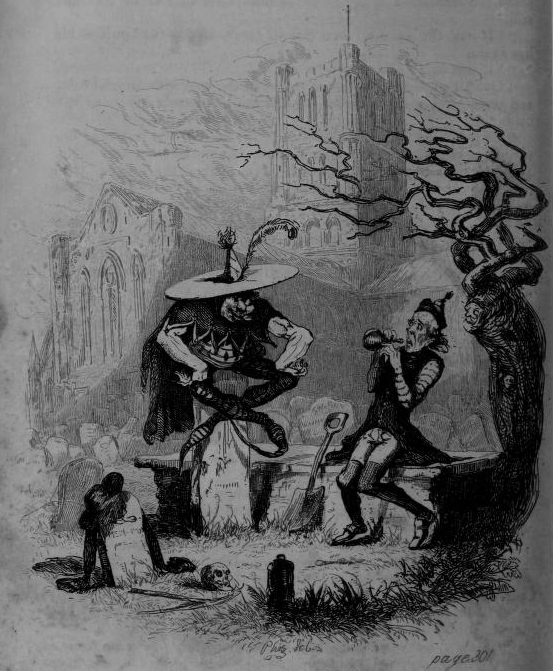
The Goblin and the Sexton

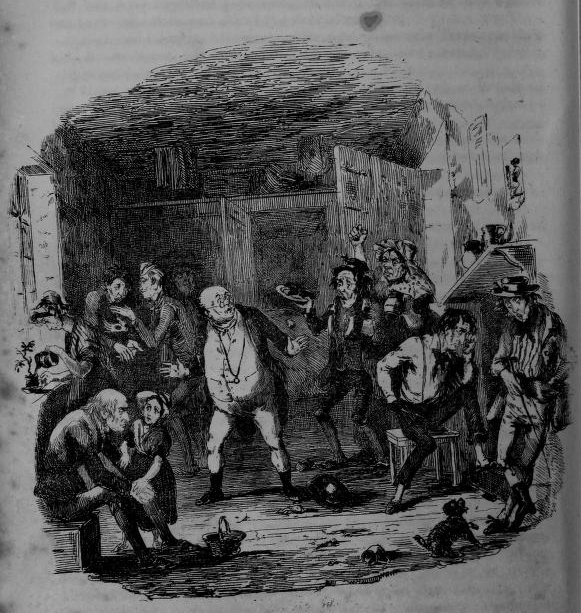
Discovery of Jingle in the Fleet

The novel was published in 19 issues over 20 months; the last was double-length and cost two shillings. In mourning for his sister-in-law Mary Hogarth, Dickens missed a deadline and consequently, there was no number issued in June 1837. Numbers were typically issued on the last day of its given month:

- I — April 1836 (chapters 1–2)
- II — May 1836 (chapters 3–5)
- III — June 1836 (chapters 6–8)
- IV — July 1836 (chapters 9-11)
- V — August 1836 (chapters 12–14)
- VI — September 1836 (chapters 15–17)
- VII — October 1836 (chapters 18–20)
- VIII — November 1836 (chapters 21–23)
- IX — December 1836 (chapters 24–26)
- X — January 1837 (chapters 27–29)
- XI — February 1837 (chapters 30–32)
- XII — March 1837 (chapters 33–34)
- XIII — April 1837 (chapters 35–37)
- XIV — May 1837 (chapters 38–40)
- XV — July 1837 (chapters 41–43)
- XVI — August 1837 (chapters 44–46)
- XVII — September 1837 (chapters 47–49)
- XVIII — October 1837 (chapters 50–52)
- XIX-XX — November 1837 (chapters 53–57)

== Models ==
Dickens drew on places that he knew from his childhood. He located the duel between Mr Winkle and Dr Slammer at Fort Pitt, at Chatham, Kent, close to Ordnance Terrace where he had lived as a boy between 1817 and 1821.

== Influences and legacy ==
The popularity of The Pickwick Papers spawned many imitations and sequels in print, as well as actual clubs and societies inspired by the club in the novel. One example still in operation is the Pickwick Bicycle Club of London, established in 1870, the year of Charles Dickens's death. The Dickens Pickwick Club was founded in 1976 by Cedric Dickens, the author's great-grandson. Other clubs, groups, and societies operating under the name "The Pickwick Club" have existed since the original publication of the story.

In 1837, Dickens wrote to William Howison about the Edinburgh Pickwick Club. Dickens approved of the use of the name and the celebration of the characters and spirit of the novel. He wrote:

If a word of encouragement from me, can as you say endow you with double life, you will be the most lively club in all the Empire, from this time; for every hearty wish that I can muster for your long-continued welfare and prosperity, is freely yours. Mr. Pickwick's heart is among you always.

Other clubs include one meeting as early as December 1836 in the East of London and another meeting at the Sun Tavern in Long Acre in London. Dickens wrote to the secretary of the latter club in 1838 about attending a meeting:

If the dinner of the Pickwick Club had been on Monday Week, I would have joined it with all the pleasure which you will readily imagine this most gratifying recollection of my works by so many gentlemen, awakens in my mind.

In many Pickwick Clubs, members can take on the names of the characters in the novel. The website for the Pickwick Bicycle Club states: "Our rules state that 'Each Member shall adopt the sobriquet allocated by the Management Committee, being the name of some male character in the Pickwick Papers, and be addressed as such at all meetings of the Club'."

On the impact of The Pickwick Papers and Dickens's pioneering serials, Carrie Sickmann Han refers to a passage in the novel concerning Sam Weller, the popular character who first appears in Pickwick's fourth installment:

While carefully crafting a Valentine to his would-be-lover Mary, Sam Weller finishes rather abruptly, and his father, looking over his shoulder, asks, "That's rayther a sudden pull up, ain't it, Sammy?" Sam's response emblematizes the driving force of the serial novel: "Not a bit on it. . . she'll vish there wos more, and that's the great art o' letter writin'". Charles Dickens's great art of serial writing aimed to leave his readers repeatedly wishing there was more: more pages, more plot, more world, and above all, more time with their favourite characters. This desire encouraged readers to imagine beyond the novel – to pursue characters outside the pages of The Pickwick Papers itself. Their desires were rewarded with a wide range of continuations that included theatrical adaptations, plagiarisms, or unauthorized sequels – anything that, like the Valentine, could reunite readers with their beloved Sam.

=== Translations ===
A French translation by Eugénie Niboyet appeared in 1838 in a two-volume edition. It was entitled Le Club des Pickwistes, roman comique. Later French translations have used titles such as Aventures de Monsieur Pickwick.

Benito Pérez Galdós published Aventuras de Pickwick, a Spanish translation of the Pickwick Papers, in 1868. Although Pérez Galdós was not born until after the publication of Dickens' first novel, he is sometimes described as the Spanish equivalent of Dickens.

== See also ==
- Sergeant Buzfuz
- Joseph Clayton Clark
- George and Vulture
- Spaniards Inn
- The Moosepath League – Van Reid's books are a tribute to the Pickwick Papers with thoroughly Pickwickian characters. In chapter four of Cordelia Underwood, Cordelia finds a copy of the Pickwick Papers in her uncle's chest.
- Wellerism
