= Sketches by Boz =

1833–1836 short story collection by Charles Dickens

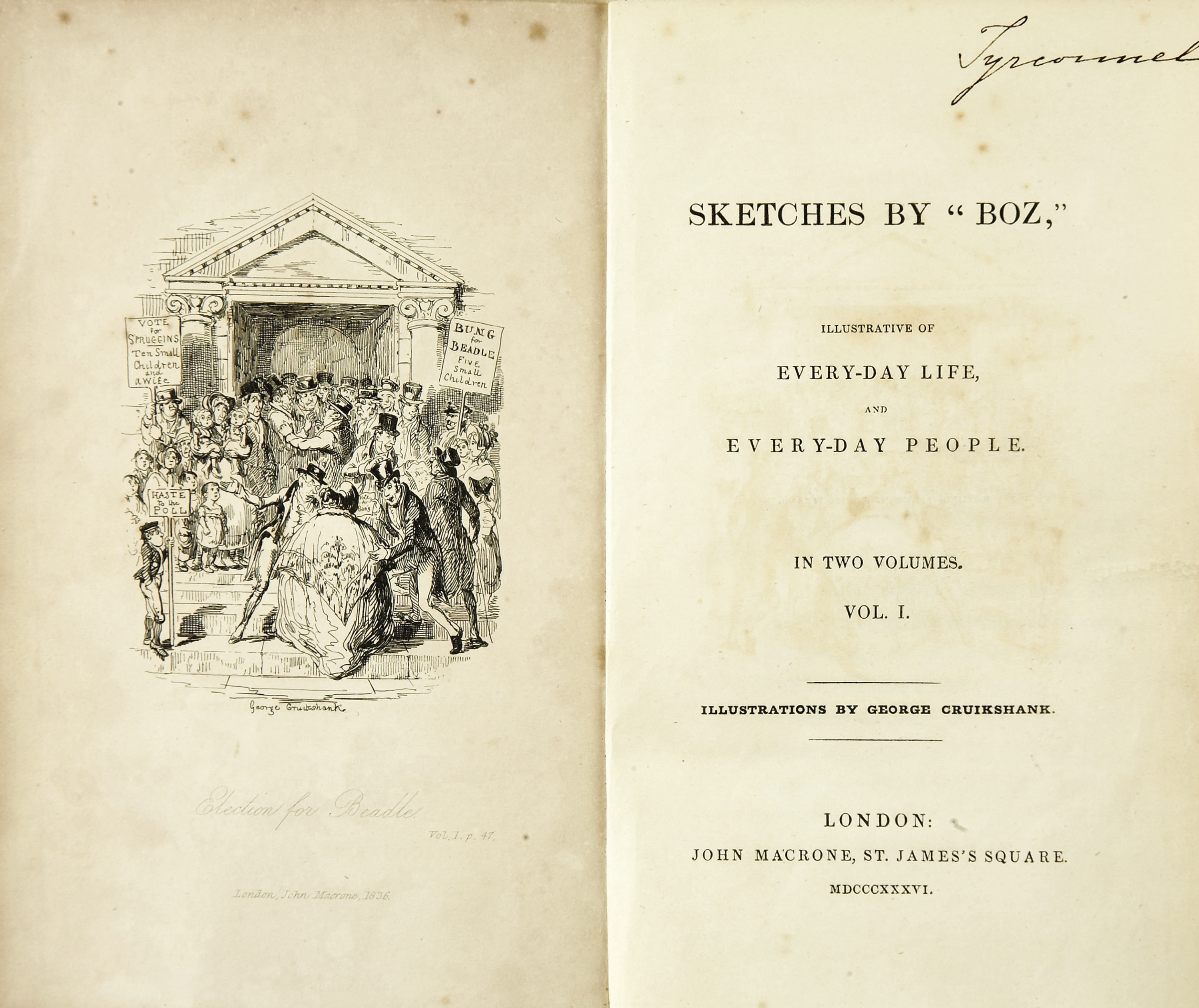
- Frontispiece of the (first series) first edition, February 1836. Illustration by George Cruikshank
- Author: Charles Dickens ("Boz")
- Original title: Sketches by "Boz," Illustrative of Every-day Life and Every-day People
- Illustrator: George Cruikshank
- Cover artist: George Cruikshank
- Language: English
- Genre: Sketches
- Published: 1833–1836 in newspapers and periodicals; in 1836 (two series); first one volume edition 1839
- Publisher: John Macrone, St. James's Square
- Publication place: England
- Followed by: The Pickwick Papers

Sketches by "Boz," Illustrative of Every-day Life and Every-day People (commonly known as Sketches by Boz) is a collection of short pieces the English author Charles Dickens originally published in various newspapers and other periodicals between 1833 and 1836. They were re-issued in book form, under their current title, in February and August 1836, with illustrations by George Cruikshank.

Sketches by "Boz," was Charles Dickens' first book. The 56 sketches concern London scenes and people, and the whole work is divided into four sections: "Our Parish", "Scenes", "Characters" and "Tales". The material in the first three sections consists of non-narrative pen-portraits, but the last section comprises fictional stories.

== The History of "Boz" ==
The sketch "Mr Minns and his Cousin" (originally titled "A Dinner at Poplar Walk"), was the first work of fiction Dickens ever published. It appeared in The Monthly Magazine in December 1833. Although Dickens continued to place pieces in that magazine, none of them bore a signature until August 1834, when "The Boarding House" appeared under the strange pen-name "Boz". A verse in Bentley's Miscellany for March 1837 recalled the public's perplexity about this pseudonym:

Who the dickens "Boz" could be
Puzzled many a learned elf,
Till time unveiled the mystery,
And "Boz" appeared as Dickens's self.

Dickens took the pseudonym from a nickname he had given his younger brother Augustus, whom he called "Moses" after a character in Oliver Goldsmith's The Vicar of Wakefield. This, "being facetiously pronounced through the nose", became "Boses", which in turn was shortened to "Boz". The name remained coupled with "inimitable" until "Boz" eventually disappeared and Dickens became known as, simply, "The Inimitable". The name was originally pronounced /ˈboʊz/ but is now usually /ˈbɒz/. Dickens' son, born in 1837, was named Charles Culliford Boz Dickens.

== Illustrations ==
The popularity of Dickens' writings was enhanced by the regular inclusion of detailed illustrations to highlight key scenes and characters. Each sketch typically featured two black-and-white illustrations, as well as an illustration for the wrapper. The images were created with wood engravings or metal etchings. Dickens worked closely with several illustrators during his career, including George Cruikshank, Hablot Knight Browne (aka "Phiz"), and John Leech. The accuracy of the illustrations was of the utmost importance to Dickens, as the drawings portrayed the characters just as he envisioned them and gave readers valuable insights about the characters' personalities and motives, as well as the plot.

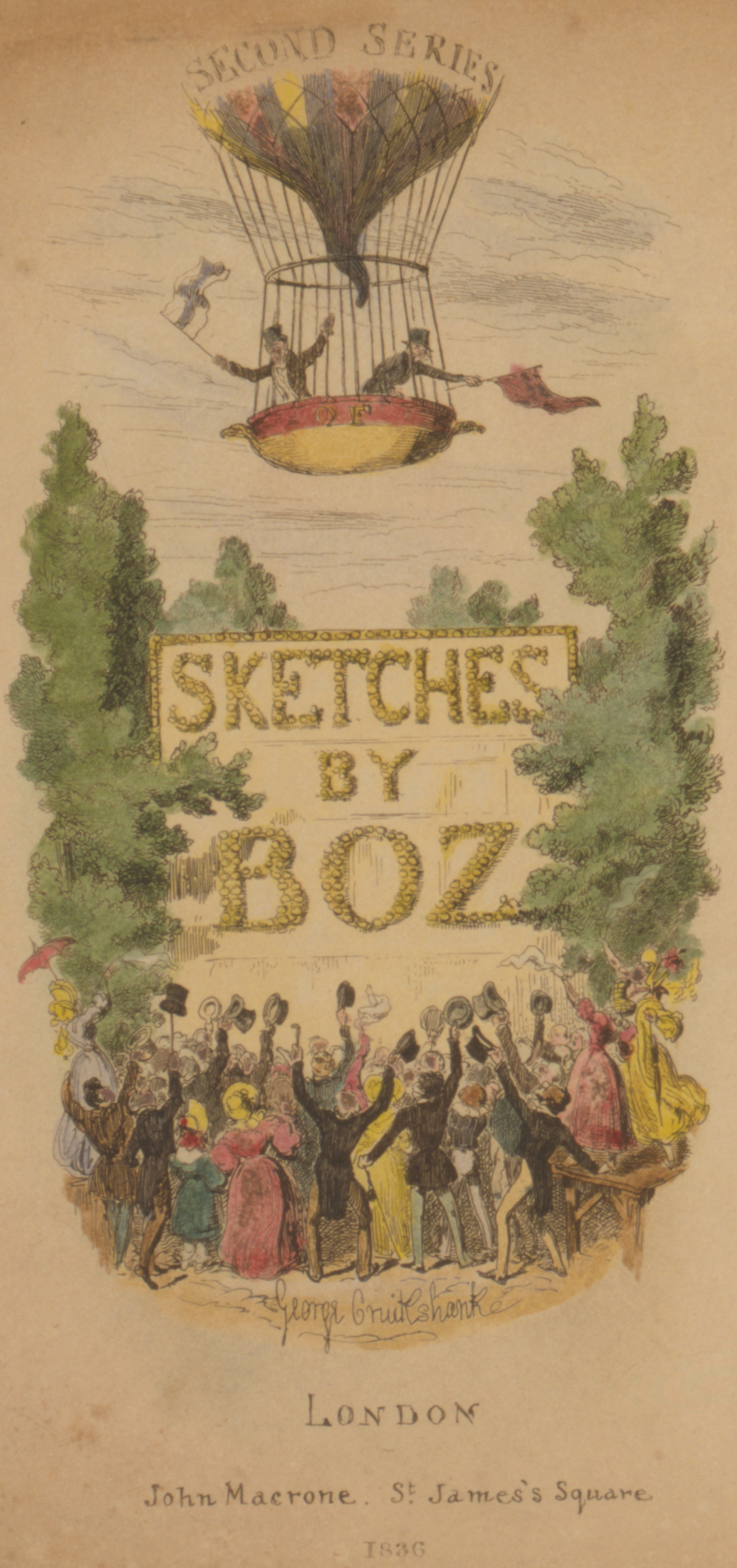
Title page of the second series (1836). The illustration by George Cruikshank portrays two figures closely resembling the author and his illustrator waving from a balloon.

== Publication ==
The earliest version of Sketches by Boz was published by John Macrone in two series: the first as a two-volume set in February 1836, just a month before the publication of the first number of The Pickwick Papers (1836–37), and then a "Second Series" in August 1836. After Dickens' fame skyrocketed, he purchased the rights to the material from Macrone.

== Instalment contents ==
The majority of the 56 sketches that appeared together in 1839 were originally published individually in popular newspapers and periodicals, including The Morning Chronicle, The Evening Chronicle, The Monthly Magazine, The Carlton Chronicle and Bell's Life in London, between 1833 and 1836:

- "Mr. Minns and his Cousin" (SB 46), originally, "A Dinner at Poplar Walk" in The Monthly Magazine, 1 December 1833.
- "Mrs. Joseph Porter, Over the Way" (SB 53), originally in The Monthly Magazine, January 1834.
- "Horatio Sparkins" (SB 49), originally in The Monthly Magazine, February 1834.
- "The Bloomsbury Christening" (SB 55), originally in The Monthly Magazine, April 1834.
- "The Boarding-House" (SB 45), originally in The Monthly Magazine, May & August 1834.
- "Sentiment" (SB 47), originally in Bell's Weekly Magazine, 7 June 1834.
- "The Steam Excursion" (SB 51), originally in The Monthly Magazine, October 1834.
- "A Passage in the Life of Mr. Watkins Tottle" (SB 54), originally "Chapter the First" and "Chapter the Second" in two numbers of The Monthly Magazine, January and February 1835.
- "The Four Sisters" (SB 3), Our Parish 3, originally, "Sketches of London No. 14" in The Evening Chronicle, 18 June 1835.
- "The Election for Beadle" (SB 4), Our Parish 4, originally, "Sketches of London No. 16" in The Evening Chronicle, 14 July 1835.
- "The Broker's Man" (SB 5), Our Parish 5, originally, "Sketches of London No. 18" in The Evening Chronicle, 28 July 1835.
- "The Ladies' Societies" (SB 6), Our Parish 6, originally, "Sketches of London No. 20" in The Evening Chronicle, 28 July 1835.
- "Miss Evans and the Eagle" (SB 36), (Scenes and Characters No. 2) originally in Bell's Life in London, 4 October 1835.
- "The Dancing Academy" (SB 41), originally, "Scenes and Characters, No. 3" in Bell's Life in London, 11 October 1835.
- "Making a Night of It" (SB 43), originally, "Scenes and Characters No. 4" in Bell's Life in London, 18 October 1835.
- "The Misplaced Attachment of Mr. John Dounce" (SB 39), originally, "Scenes and Characters No. 5. Love and Oysters," in Bell's Life in London, 25 October 1835.
- "Some Account of an Omnibus Cad" originally, "Scenes and Characters No. 6," later retitled and expanded into "The Last Cab-driver and the First Omnibus Cab"; in Bell's Life in London, 1 November 1835.
- "The Mistaken Milliner. A Tale of Ambition" (SB 40) originally "Scenes and Characters No. 7. The Vocal Dressmaker," in Bell's Life in London, 22 November 1835.
- "The New Year" (SB 35), originally in Bell's Life in London, 3 January 1836.
- "The Great Winglebury Duel" (SB 52), originally in the First Series of Sketches by Boz, 8 February 1836.
- "The Black Veil" (SB 50) originally in the First Series of Sketches by Boz, 8 February 1836.
- "Our Next-Door Neighbour" (Our Parish 7), originally, "Our Next-Door Neighbours" in The Morning Chronicle, 18 March 1836.
- "The Tuggses at Ramsgate" (Tales 4), originally in The Library of Fiction No. 1, 31 March 1836 (accompanied by two Robert Seymour woodcuts).
- "The Hospital Patient" (SB 38), Characters 6, originally in The Carlton Chronicle, 6 August 1836.
- "The Drunkard's Death" (SB 56), originally in the Second Series of Sketches by Boz, 17 December 1836.

== Book Contents ==
The contents of Sketches by Boz are:

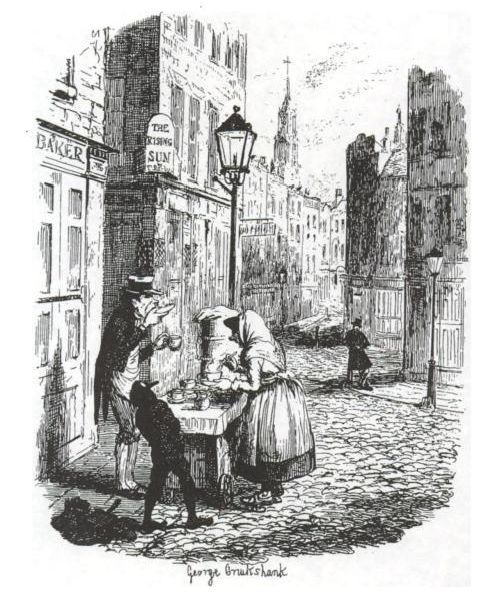
The Streets – morning, Illustration by George Cruikshank

- Our Parish
  - The Beadle. The Parish Engine. The Schoolmaster.
  - The Curate. The Old Lady. The Half-pay Captain
  - The Four Sisters
  - The Election for Beadle
  - The Broker's Man
  - The Ladies' Societies
  - Our Next-Door Neighbour
- Scenes
  - The Streets – Morning
  - The Streets – Night
  - Shops and Their Tenants
  - Scotland Yard
  - Seven Dials
  - Meditations in Monmouth-Street
  - Hackney-Coach Stands
  - Doctors' Commons
  - London Recreations
  - The River
  - Astley's
  - Greenwich Fair
  - Private Theatres
  - Vauxhall Gardens by Day
  - Early Coaches
  - Omnibuses
  - The Last Cab-Driver, and the First Omnibus Cad
  - A Parliamentary Sketch
  - Public Dinners
  - The First of May
  - Brokers' and Marine-Store Shops
  - Gin-Shops
  - The Pawnbroker's Shop
  - Criminal Courts
  - A Visit to Newgate
- Characters
  - Thoughts about People
  - A Christmas Dinner
  - The New Year
  - Miss Evans and the Eagle
  - The Parlour Orator
  - The Hospital Patient
  - The Misplaced Attachment of Mr John Dounce
  - The Mistaken Milliner. A Tale of Ambition
  - The Dancing Academy
  - Shabby-Genteel People
  - Making a Night of It
  - The Prisoners' Van
- Tales
  - The Boarding-House
    - Chapter the first
    - Chapter the second
  - Mr Minns and his Cousin
  - Sentiment
  - The Tuggses at Ramsgate
  - Horatio Sparkins
  - The Black Veil
  - The Steam Excursion
  - The Great Winglebury Duel
  - Mrs Joseph Porter
  - A Passage in the Life of Mr Watkins Tottle
    - Chapter the first
    - Chapter the second
  - The Bloomsbury Christening
  - The Drunkard's Death
