= Chapman & Hall =

Publisher

- Parent company: CRC Press
- Founded: 1834
- Founder: Edward Chapman; William Hall
- Country of origin: United Kingdom
- Publication types: Books
- Nonfiction topics: Mathematics, statistics
- Official website: crcpress.com

Chapman & Hall is an imprint owned by CRC Press, originally founded as a British publishing house in London in the first half of the 19th century by Edward Chapman and William Hall. Chapman & Hall were publishers for Charles Dickens (from 1840 until 1844 and again from 1858 until 1870), Thomas Carlyle, William Thackeray, Elizabeth Barrett Browning, Anthony Trollope, Eadweard Muybridge and Evelyn Waugh, and his brother Alec Waugh.

== History ==
Upon Hall's death in 1847, Chapman's cousin Frederic Chapman began his progress through the ranks of the company and eventually becoming a partner in 1858 and sole proprietor on Edward Chapman's retirement from Chapman & Hall in 1866. In 1868 author Anthony Trollope bought a third of the company for his son, Henry Merivale Trollope. From 1902 to 1930 the company's managing director was Arthur Waugh. In the 1930s the company merged with Methuen, a merger which, in 1955, participated in forming the Associated Book Publishers. The latter was acquired by The Thomson Corporation in 1987.

Chapman & Hall was sold again in 1998 as part of Thomson Scientific and Professional to Wolters Kluwer, who sold on its well-regarded mathematics and statistics list to CRC Press. Today the name of Chapman & Hall/CRC is used as an imprint for science and technology books by Taylor and Francis, part of the Informa group since 2004.

Most notably, the company were publishers for Charles Dickens (from 1840 until 1844 and again from 1858 until 1870), Thomas Carlyle, William Thackeray, Elizabeth Barrett Browning, Anthony Trollope, Eadweard Muybridge and Evelyn Waugh. They continued to publish previously unpublished Dickens material well into the 20th century. Another popular author on the books in the 1880s was Henry Hawley Smart.

The firm kept an office at 186 Strand and later at 193 Piccadilly, as well as 11 Henrietta Street in Covent Garden.

== Book series ==
- Chapman and Hall's 2/- Net Library
- The Library of Fiction, or Family Story-teller
- Fish and Fisheries Series
- The Foreign Library
- Library of Travel
- The Select Library of Fiction
- XVIII Century French Romances
