= Charles Dickens bibliography =

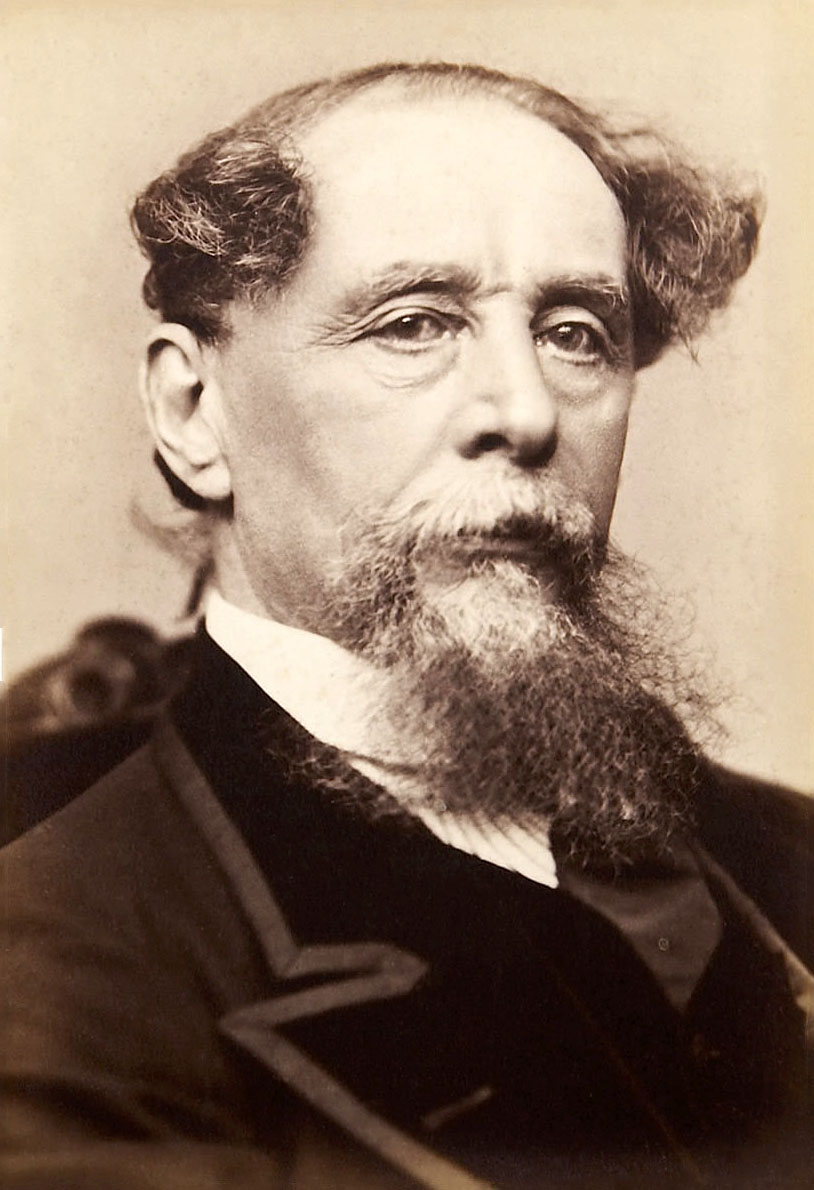
- Portrait by Jeremiah Gurney, c. 1867–1868
- Novels↙: 21
- Plays↙: 7
- Articles and essays↙: 50

The bibliography of Charles Dickens (1812–1870) includes more than a dozen major novels, many short stories (including Christmas-themed stories and ghost stories), several plays, several non-fiction books, and individual essays and articles. Dickens's novels were serialized initially in weekly or monthly magazines, then reprinted in standard book formats.

== Novels ==
Title	Year	Publication	Notes	Text at Wikisource
The Pickwick Papers	1837	Monthly serial, April 1836 to November 1837		Text
Oliver Twist	1838	Monthly serial in Bentley's Miscellany, February 1837 to April 1839		Text
Nicholas Nickleby	1839	Monthly serial, April 1838 to October 1839		Text
The Old Curiosity Shop	1841	Weekly serial in Master Humphrey's Clock, 25 April 1840 to 6 February 1841		Text
Barnaby Rudge	1841	Weekly serial in Master Humphrey's Clock, 13 February 1841, to 27 November 1841	Historical novel	Text
Martin Chuzzlewit	1844	Monthly serial, December 1842 to July 1844		Text
A Christmas Carol	1843		Christmas novella	Text
The Chimes	1844		Christmas novella	Text
The Cricket on the Hearth	1845		Christmas novella	Text
The Battle of Life	1846		Christmas novella	Text
The Haunted Man and the Ghost's Bargain	1848		Christmas novella	Text
Dombey and Son	1848	Monthly serial, October 1846 to April 1848		Text
David Copperfield	1850	Monthly serial, May 1849 to November 1850		Text
Bleak House	1853	Monthly serial, March 1852 to September 1853		Text
Hard Times	1854	Weekly serial in Household Words, 1 April 1854, to 12 August 1854		Text
Little Dorrit	1857	Monthly serial, December 1855 to June 1857		Text
A Tale of Two Cities	1859	Weekly serial in All the Year Round, 30 April 1859, to 26 November 1859	Historical novel	Text
Great Expectations	1861	Weekly serial in All the Year Round, 1 December 1860 to 3 August 1861		Text
Our Mutual Friend	1865	Monthly serial, May 1864 to November 1865		Text
No Thoroughfare	1867		Written with Wilkie Collins, also published as a stageplay	
The Mystery of Edwin Drood	1870	Monthly serial, April 1870 to September 1870	Unfinished – Only six of twelve planned numbers completed	Text

== Short stories ==
- "Mr. Minns and his Cousin" (1833) (part of Sketches by Boz)
- "Mrs. Joseph Porter" (1834) (part of Sketches by Boz)
- "Horatio Sparkins" (1834) (part of Sketches by Boz)
- "The Bloomsbury Christening" (1834) (part of Sketches by Boz)
- "The Boarding-House" (1834) (part of Sketches by Boz)
- "Sentiment" (1834) (part of Sketches by Boz)
- "The Steam Excursion" (1834) (part of Sketches by Boz)
- "A Passage in the Life of Mr. Watkins Tottle" (1835) (part of Sketches by Boz)
- "The Great Winglebury Duel" (1836) (part of Sketches by Boz)
- "The Black Veil" (1836) (part of Sketches by Boz)
- "The Tuggses at Ramsgate" (1836) (part of Sketches by Boz)
- "The Drunkard's Death" (1836) (part of Sketches by Boz)
- "The Stroller's Tale" (1836) (part of The Pickwick Papers)
- "The Convict's Return" (1836) (part of The Pickwick Papers)
- "A Madman's Manuscript" (1836) (part of The Pickwick Papers)
- "The Bagman's Story" (1836) (part of The Pickwick Papers)
- "The Parish Clerk" (1836) (part of The Pickwick Papers)
- "The Old Man's Tale" (1836) (part of The Pickwick Papers)
- "The Story of the Goblins who Stole a Sexton" (1836) (part of The Pickwick Papers)
- "The True Legend of P. B." (1837) (part of The Pickwick Papers)
- "The Story of the Bagman's Uncle" (1837) (part of The Pickwick Papers)
- "Public Life of Mr. Tulrumble" (1837) (part of The Mudfog Papers)
- "The Pantomime of Life" (1837) (part of The Mudfog Papers)
- "Some Particulars Concerning a Lion" (1837) (part of The Mudfog Papers)
- "The First Meeting" (1837) (part of The Mudfog Papers)
- "The Second Meeting" (1838) (part of The Mudfog Papers)
- "Mr. Robert Bolton" (1838) (part of The Mudfog Papers)
- "Familiar Epistle from a Parent to a Child" (1838) (part of The Mudfog Papers)
- "The Lamplighter" (1838)
- "The Five Sisters of York" (1839) (part of Nicholas Nickleby)
- "The Baron of Grogzwig" (1839) (part of Nicholas Nickleby)
- "First Night of the Giant Chronicles" (1840) (part of Master Humphrey's Clock)
- "A Confession Found in a Prison in the Time of Charles the Second" (1840) (part of Master Humphrey's Clock)
- "Mr. Pickwick's Tale" (1840) (part of Master Humphrey's Clock)
- "A Child's Dream of a Star" (1850)
- "Captain Murderer" (1850) (part of The Uncommercial Traveller)
- "To Be Read at Dusk" (1852)
- "The Long Voyage" (1853)
- "Prince Bull" (1855)
- "The Thousand and One Humbugs" (1855)
- "The History of a Self-Tormentor" (1857) (part of Little Dorrit)
- "Mrs. Gamp" (1858) (part of Martin Chuzzlewit)
- "Hunted Down" (1859)
- "The Substance of the Shadow" (1859) (part of A Tale of Two Cities)
- "George Silverman's Explanation" (1868)
- "Holiday Romance" (1868)

=== Stories from collaborative works ===
- "The Poor Relation's Story" (1852) (part of A Round of Stories by the Christmas Fire)
- "The Child's Story" (1852) (part of A Round of Stories by the Christmas Fire)
- "The Schoolboy's Story" (1853) (part of Another Round of Stories by the Christmas Fire)
- "Nobody's Story" (1853) (part of Another Round of Stories by the Christmas Fire)
- "The First Poor Traveller" (1854) (part of The Seven Poor Travellers)
- "The Road" (1854) (part of The Seven Poor Travellers)
- "The Guest" (1855) (part of The Holly-tree Inn)
- "The Boots" (1855) (part of The Holly-tree Inn)
- "The Bill" (1855) (part of The Holly-tree Inn)
- "The Wreck" (1856) (part of The Wreck of the Golden Mary)
- "The Ghost in the Bride's Chamber" (1857) (part of The Lazy Tour of Two Idle Apprentices)
- "The Island of Silver-Store" (1857) (part of The Perils of Certain English Prisoners)
- "The Rafts on the River" (1857) (part of The Perils of Certain English Prisoners)
- "Going into Society" (1858) (part of A House to Let)
- "The Mortals in the House" (1859) (part of The Haunted House)
- "The Ghost in Master B.'s Room" (1859) (part of The Haunted House)
- "The Ghost in the Corner Room" (1859) (part of The Haunted House)
- "The Village" (1860) (part of A Message from the Sea)
- "The Money" (1860) (part of A Message from the Sea)
- "The Restitution" (1860) (part of A Message from the Sea)
- "Picking Up Soot and Cinders" (1861) (part of Tom Tiddler's Ground)
- "Picking Up Miss Kimmeens" (1861) (part of Tom Tiddler's Ground)
- "Picking Up the Tinker" (1861) (part of Tom Tiddler's Ground)
- "His Leaving It Till Called For" (1862) (part of Somebody's Luggage)
- "His Boots" (1862) (part of Somebody's Luggage)
- "His Brown-Paper Parcel" (1862) (part of Somebody's Luggage)
- "His Wonderful End" (1862) (part of Somebody's Luggage)
- "How Mrs. Lirriper Carried on the Business" (1863) (part of Mrs. Lirriper's Lodgings)
- "How the Parlour Added a Few Words" (1863) (part of Mrs. Lirriper's Lodgings)
- "How She Went On, and Went Over" (1864) (part of Mrs. Lirriper's Legacy)
- "How Jemmy Topped Up" (1864) (part of Mrs. Lirriper's Legacy)
- "To Be Taken Immediately" (1865) (part of Doctor Marigold’s Prescriptions)
- "The Trial for Murder" (1865) (part of Doctor Marigold’s Prescriptions)
- "To Be Taken for Life" (1865) (part of Doctor Marigold’s Prescriptions)
- "Barbox Brothers" (1866) (part of Mugby Junction)
- "The Boy at Mugby" (1866) (part of Mugby Junction)
- "The Signal-Man" (1866) (part of Mugby Junction)

=== Short story collections ===
- Sketches by Boz (1836)
- The Mudfog Papers (1837–38)
- Sketches of Young Gentlemen (1838)
- Sketches of Young Couples (1840)
- Master Humphrey's Clock (1840–41)
- The Poor Traveller, Boots at the Holly-Tree Inn and Mrs. Gamp (1858)
- Reprinted Pieces (1861)
- Three Ghost Stories (1866)
- Christmas Stories (1868)
- The Lamplighter, To Be Read at Dusk and Sunday under Three Heads (1868)

== Collaborative works ==
During his tenure as editor of Household Words and All the Year Round, Dickens collaborated with other writers, usually for seasonal issues of the magazines, producing the following works:

- Published in Household Words:
  - "A Round of Stories by the Christmas Fire" (1852) (with William Moy Thomas, Elizabeth Gaskell, Edmund Ollier, James White, Edmund Saul Dixon, Harriet Martineau, Samuel Sidney and Eliza Griffiths)
  - "Another Round of Stories by the Christmas Fire" (1853) (with Eliza Linton, George Sala, Adelaide Procter, Elizabeth Gaskell, Edmund Saul Dixon, William Henry Wills and Samuel Sidney)
  - "The Seven Poor Travellers" (1854) (with Wilkie Collins, Adelaide Procter, George Sala and Eliza Linton – about the Six Poor Travellers House)
  - "The Holly-tree Inn" (1855) (with Wilkie Collins, William Howitt, Harriet Parr and Adelaide Procter)
  - "The Wreck of the Golden Mary" (1856) (with Wilkie Collins, Adelaide Procter, Harriet Parr, Percy Fitzgerald and James White)
  - "The Lazy Tour of Two Idle Apprentices" (1857) (with Wilkie Collins)
  - "The Perils of Certain English Prisoners" (1857) (with Wilkie Collins)
  - "A House to Let" (1858) (with Wilkie Collins, Elizabeth Gaskell and Adelaide Procter)
- Published in All the Year Round:
  - "The Haunted House" (1859) (with Wilkie Collins, Elizabeth Gaskell, Adelaide Procter, George Sala and Hesba Stretton)
  - "A Message from the Sea" (1860) (with Wilkie Collins, Robert Buchanan, Charles Allston Collins, Amelia Edwards and Harriet Parr)
  - "Tom Tiddler's Ground" (1861) (with Wilkie Collins, Charles Allston Collins, Amelia Edwards and John Harwood)
  - "Somebody's Luggage" (1862) (with John Oxenford, Charles Allston Collins, Arthur Locker and Julia Cecilia Stretton)
  - "Mrs. Lirriper's Lodgings" (1863) (with Elizabeth Gaskell, Andrew Halliday, Edmund Yates, Amelia Edwards and Charles Allston Collins)
  - "Mrs. Lirriper's Legacy" (1864) (with Charles Allston Collins, Amelia Edwards, Rosa Mulholland, Henry Spicer and Hesba Stretton)
  - "Doctor Marigold’s Prescriptions" (1865) (with Charles Allston Collins, Hesba Stretton, George Walter Thornbury and Caroline Leigh Gascoigne)
  - "Mugby Junction" (1866) (with Andrew Halliday, Hesba Stretton, Charles Allston Collins and Amelia Edwards)
  - "No Thoroughfare" (1867) (with Wilkie Collins)

== Poetry ==
- Songs from The Village Coquettes (1836)
- "The Ivy Green", "A Christmas Carol", "Gabriel Grub's Song" and "The Romance of Dick Turpin" (from The Pickwick Papers) (1837)
- "Duet" (from The Lamplighter) (1838)
- "The Loving Ballad of Lord Bateman" (1839)
- Three Political Squibs from the Examiner ("The Fine Old English Gentleman", "The Quack Doctor's Proclamation" and "Subjects for Painters") (1841)
- "Prologue" (from John Westland Marston's play The Patrician's Daughter (1842)
- "A Word in Season" (1844)
- "All Hail to the Vessel of Pecksniff the Sire" and "It May Lighten and Storm" (from Martin Chuzzlewit) (1844)
- Verses from the Daily News ("The British Lion" and "The Hymn of the Wiltshire Labourers") (1846)
- "New Song" (to Mark Lemon) (1849)
- "Prologue" and "The Song of the Wreck" (from Wilkie Collins' play The Lighthouse) (1855)
- "A Child’s Hymn" (from The Wreck of the Golden Mary) (1856)
- "Prologue" (from Dickens and Collins' play The Frozen Deep) (1857)
- The Complete Poems of Charles Dickens (collection, 1885)

== Plays ==
Title	Year	Style	Notes
The Strange Gentleman	1836	Comic opera	
The Village Coquettes	1836	Comic opera	
Is She His Wife? Or, Something Singular!	1837	Comic opera	
The Lamplighter	1838	Farce	
Mr. Nightingale's Diary	1851	Farce	with Mark Lemon
The Frozen Deep	1857		with Wilkie Collins
No Thoroughfare	1867		With Wilkie Collins

== Nonfiction ==
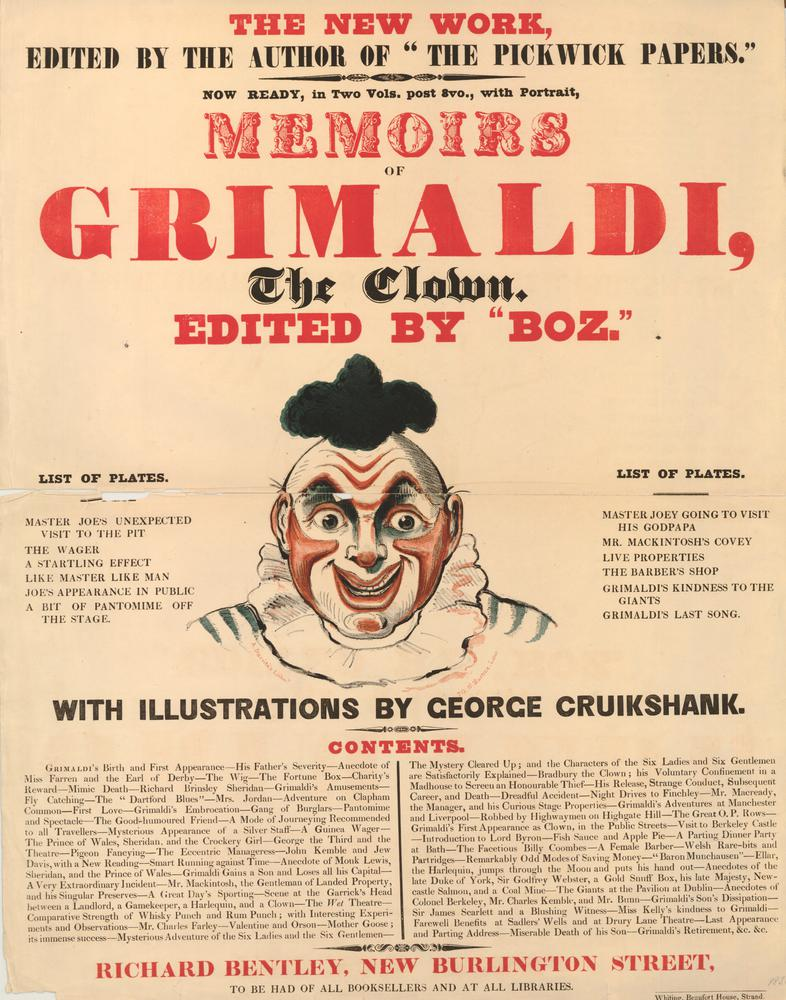
1838 Poster advertisement for Memoirs of Grimaldi

- Sunday Under Three Heads (1836) (under the pseudonym "Timothy Sparks")
- Memoirs of Joseph Grimaldi (1838) (edited by Dickens under his regular nom de plume, "Boz")
- American Notes for General Circulation (1842)
- Pictures from Italy (1846)
- The Life of Our Lord (1846–1849, pub. 1934)
- A Child's History of England (1853)
- The Uncommercial Traveller (1860–1869)
- Speeches, Letters and Sayings (1870)
- Miscellaneous Papers (1912)
- Contributions to All The Year Round (1912)
- Letters of Charles Dickens to Wilkie Collins (1851–1870, pub. 1892) (selected by Georgina Hogarth)

== Letters ==
Editing and publication of the reference edition of Dickens's letters started in 1949 when publisher Rupert Hart-Davis persuaded Humphry House of Wadham College, Oxford, to edit a complete edition of the letters. House died suddenly aged 46 in 1955. However, the work continued, and by 2002 Volume 12 had been published. The letters are collected chronologically; thus volume 1 covers the years 1820–1839; volume 2, 1840–1841; volume 3, 1842–1843; volume 4, 1844–1846; volume 5, 1847–1849; volume 6, 1850–1852; volume 7, 1853–1855; volume 8, 1856–1858; volume 9, 1859–1861; volume 10, 1862–1864; volume 11, 1865–1867; and volume 12, 1868–1870.

== Collections ==
Title	Year	Publisher	Notes
Letters of Charles Dickens Volume I			
Letters of Charles Dickens Volume II			
Letters of Charles Dickens Volume III	1881	Charles Shribner’s Sons	Edited by Mamie Dickens and Georgina Hogarth
The plays and poems of Charles Dickens, with a few miscellanies in prose Volume I	1885	W. H. Allen & Co.	Edited by Richard Herne Shepherd
The plays and poems of Charles Dickens, with a few miscellanies in prose Volume II	1885	W. H. Allen & Co	Edited by Richard Herne Shepherd
Old lamps for new ones, and other sketches and essays hitherto uncollected	1897		Edited by Frederick G. Kitton

== Articles and essays ==
- "Christmas Festivities" (1835; also known as "A Christmas Dinner")
- "The Agricultural Interest" (1844)
- "Threatening Letter to Thomas Hood from an Ancient Gentleman" (1844)
- "The Spirit of Chivalry in Westminster Hall" (1845)
- "Crime and Education" (1846)
- "Capital Punishment" (1846)
- "The Begging-Letter Writer" (1850)
- "A Coal Miner's Evidence" (1850)
- "The Ghost of Art" (1850)
- "A Poor Man's Tale of a Patent" (1850)
- "The Detective Police" (1850)
- "Three Detective Anecdotes" (1850)
- "A Walk in a Workhouse" (1850)
- "A Christmas Tree" (1850)
- "Our English Watering-Place" (1851)
- "Bill-Sticking" (1851)
- "Births. Mrs. Meek, of a Son" (1851)
- "A Flight" (1851)
- "On Duty with Inspector Field" (1851)
- "Our School" (1851)
- "A Monument of French Folly" (1851)
- "What Christmas is, as We Grow Older" (1851)
- "A Curious Dance Round a Curious Tree" (1852)
- "Lying Awake" (1852)
- "A Plated Article" (1852)
- "Our Honourable Friend" (1852)
- "Our Vestry" (1852)
- "Our Bore" (1852)
- "Down with the Tide" (1853)
- "Frauds on the Fairies" (1853)
- "Our French Watering-Place" (1854)
- "The Noble Savage" (1854)
- "The Lost Arctic Voyagers" (1854)
- "Out of Town" (1855)
- "Out of the Season" (1855)
- "The Poor Man and his Beer" (1859)
- "Five New Points of Criminal Law" (1859)
- "Leigh Hunt: A Remonstrance" (1859)
- "The Tattlesnivel Bleater" (1859)
- "The Young Man from the Country" (1862)
- "An Enlightened Clergyman" (1862)
- "Rather a Strong Dose" (1863)
- "The Martyr Medium" (1863)
- "In Memoriam W. M. Thackeray" (1864)
- "Adelaide Anne Procter: Introduction to her Legends and Lyrics" (1866)
- "The Late Mr. Stanfield" (1867)
- "A Slight Question of Fact" (1869)
- "Landor's Life" (1869)
- "Explanatory Introduction to Religious Opinions by the Late Reverend Chauncey Hare Townshend" (1869)
- "On Mr. Fechter's Acting" (1869)
