= Book series =

Sequence of books

A book series, or a novel series, is a sequence of books having certain characteristics in common that are formally identified together as a group. Book series can be organized in different ways, such as written by the same author, or marketed as a group by their publisher.

== Publishers' reprint series ==
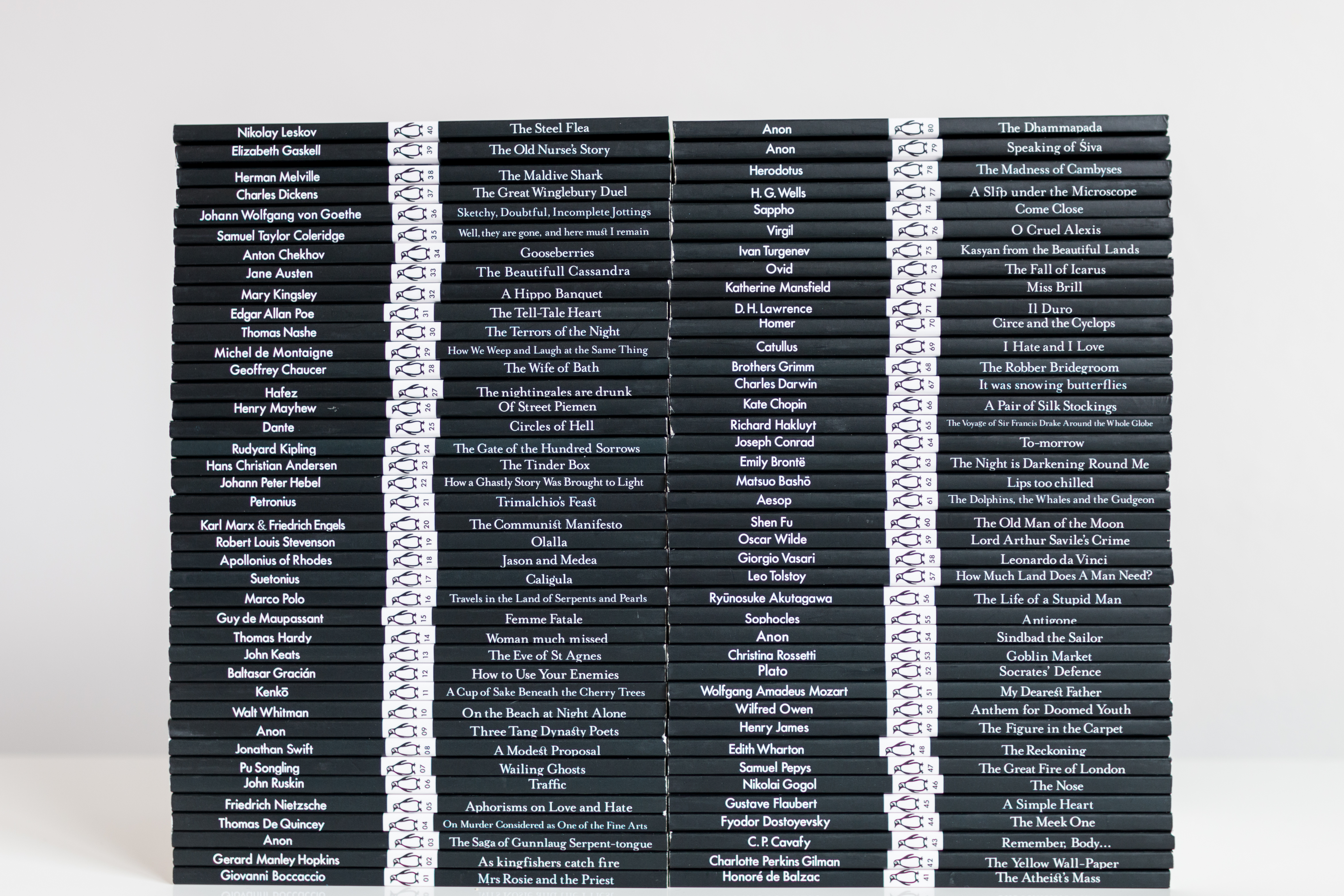
Collection of the Penguin Books series Little Black Classics

Reprint series of public domain fiction (and sometimes nonfiction) books appeared as early as the 18th century, with the series The Poets of Great Britain Complete from Chaucer to Churchill (founded by British publisher John Bell in 1777).

In 1841 the German Tauchnitz publishing firm launched the Collection of British and American Authors, a reprint series of inexpensive paperbound editions of both public domain and copyrighted fiction and nonfiction works. This book series was unique for paying living authors of the works published even though copyright protection did not exist between nations in the 19th century.

Later British reprint series were to include the Routledge's Railway Library (George Routledge, 1848–99), the Oxford World's Classics (Oxford University Press, from 1901), the Everyman's Library (J. M. Dent, from 1906), the Penguin Classics (Penguin Books, from 1945) and the Penguin English Library (from 1963).

Reprint series were also published in the United States, including the Modern Library (Boni & Liveright, from 1917), in Germany, including the Universal-Bibliothek (Reclam, from 1867), and in most other countries of the world.

== Fiction books ==
A novel sequence is a set or series of novels which share common themes, characters, or settings, but where each novel has its own title and free-standing storyline, and can thus be read independently or out of sequence. A novel sequence contains story arcs or themes that cross over several books, rather than simply sharing one or more characters.

Fictional series typically share a common setting, story arc, set of characters or timeline. They are common in genre fiction, particularly crime fiction, adventure fiction, and speculative fiction, as well as in children's literature.

Some works in a series can stand alone—they can be read in any order, as each book makes few, if any, reference to past events, and the characters seldom, if ever, change. Many of these series books may be published in a numbered series. Examples of such series are works like The Hardy Boys, Nancy Drew, and Nick Carter.

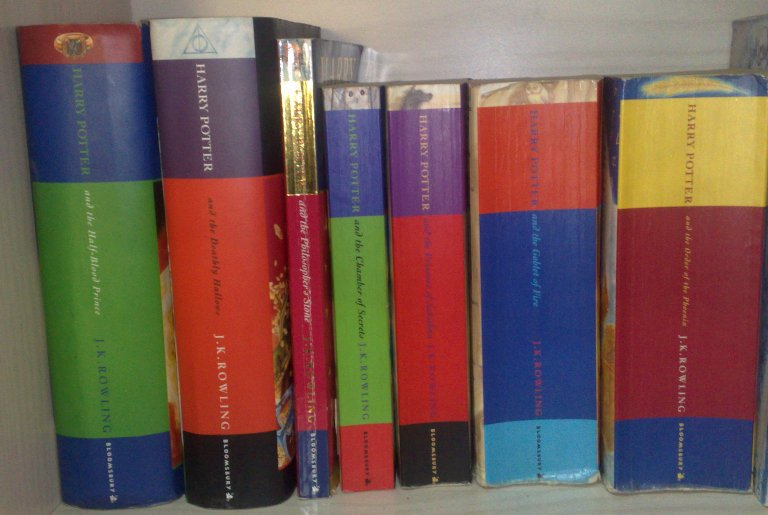
Collection of the seven books in the Harry Potter series

Some series do have their characters go through changes, and make references to past events. Typically such series are published in the order of their internal chronology, so that the next book published follows the previous book. How much these changes matter will vary from series to series (and reader to reader). For some, it may be minor—characters might get engaged, change jobs, etc., but it does not affect the main storyline. Examples of this type include Tony Hillerman's Jim Chee and Joe Leaphorn books. In other series, the changes are major and the books must be read in order to be fully enjoyed. Examples of this type include the Harry Potter series.

Some book series are not exactly proper series, but rather single books that are so large that they are published in two or more volumes. Examples of this type include The Lord of the Rings volumes or the Dark Tower series by Stephen King.

Some authors make it difficult to list their books in a numerical order when they do not release each work in its 'proper' order by the story's internal chronology. They might 'jump' back in time to early adventures of the characters, writing works that must be placed before or between previously published works. Thus, the books in a series are sometimes enumerated according to the internal chronology rather than in publication order, depending on the intended purpose for the list. Examples of this series include works from the Chronicles of Narnia, where the fifth book published, The Horse and His Boy, is actually set during the time of the first book, and the sixth book published, The Magician's Nephew is actually set long before the first book. This was done intentionally by C. S. Lewis, a scholar of medieval literature. Medieval literature did not always tell a story chronologically.

=== Definitions ===
There is no useful, formal demarcation between novel sequences and multi-part novels. Novels that are related may or may not fall into a clear sequence. It is also debatable whether a trilogy is long enough and whether its parts are discrete enough to qualify as a novel sequence.

For example, the Barchester novels of Anthony Trollope are only loosely related, although they contain a recurring cast of characters; his political novels about the Pallisers have a tighter connection and dynamic. A strict definition might exclude both.

=== History ===
With precedents such as Madeleine de Scudéry's magnum opus, Artamène, the novel sequence was a product of the nineteenth century, with James Fenimore Cooper's works appearing in the 1820s, and Anthony Trollope's Barchester books in the 1850s. In French literature, Honoré de Balzac's ambitious La Comédie humaine, a set of nearly 100 novels, novellas and short stories with some recurring characters, started to come together during the 1830s. Émile Zola's Rougon-Macquart cycle is a family saga, a format that later became a popular fictional form, going beyond the conventional three-volume novel.

A roman-fleuve (French, literally "river-novel") is an extended sequence of novels of which the whole acts as a commentary for a society or an epoch, and which continually deals with a central character, community or a saga within a family. The river metaphor implies a steady, broad dynamic lending itself to a perspective. Each volume makes up a complete novel by itself, but the entire cycle exhibits unifying characteristics.

The metaphor of the roman-fleuve was coined by Romain Rolland to describe his 10-volume cycle Jean-Christophe. In the preface to the seventh volume, Dans la maison (1908/1909) he wrote: "When you see a man, do you ask yourself whether he is a novel or a poem? ... Jean-Christophe has always seemed to me to flow like a river; I have said as much from the first pages."

The term has subsequently been applied to other French novel sequences, particularly of the years between the world wars, notably:

- Marcel Proust, À la recherche du temps perdu (1908–22)
- Georges Duhamel, Vie et aventures de Salavin (1920–32) and Chronique des Pasquier (1933–45)
- Roger Martin du Gard, The Thibaults (1922–40)
- Jules Romains, Les Hommes de bonne volonté (1932–47)
- Louis Aragon, Cycle du monde réel (1933–51)
- Jacques Chardonne, Les Destinées sentimentales (1934–36)

The 19th-century predecessors may be distinguished as being rather "family sagas", as their stories are from the perspective of a single family, rather than society as a whole.

Marcel Proust's À la recherche du temps perdu has come to be regarded as a definitive roman fleuve. Today, however, its seven volumes are generally considered to be a single novel.

Proust's work was immensely influential, particularly on British novelists of the middle of the twentieth century who did not favour modernism. Some of those follow the example of Anthony Powell, a Proust disciple, but consciously adapting the technique to depict social change, rather than change in high society. This was a step beyond the realist novels of Arnold Bennett (the Clayhanger books) or John Galsworthy.

=== Twentieth century ===
The twenty-novel Aubrey-Maturin series by the English author Patrick O'Brian has been called perhaps the best-loved roman fleuve of the twentieth century: "[an] epic of two heroic yet believably realistic men that would in some ways define a generation".

=== Development of the novel sequence ===
Although sequences of genre fiction are sometimes not considered to be romans-fleuves, novel sequences are particularly common in science fiction and epic fantasy genres. Recurring, self-consistent genre fiction settings are often called fictional universes, and the individual narrative works in such a setting are said to form a continuity or canon.

The introduction of the preconstructed novel sequence is often attributed to E. E. Doc Smith, with his Lensman books. Such sequences, from contemporary authors, tend to be more clearly defined than earlier examples. Authors are now more likely to announce an overall series title, or write in round numbers such as 12 volumes. These characteristics are not those of the classical model forms, and become more like the franchises of the film industry.

=== Other examples ===
- Jacques Abeille's Le Cycle des contrées
- Louis Aragon's Cycle du Monde Réel
- A. S. Byatt's "Frederica Potter" quartet
- Jacques Chardonne's Les Destinées sentimentales
- James Fenimore Cooper's Leatherstocking Tales
- John Crowley's Ægypt Cycle
- Lawrence Durrell's Alexandria Quartet and other sequences
- Ford Madox Ford's Parade's End
- C. S. Forester's "Horatio Hornblower" series
- John Galsworthy's The Forsyte Saga
- Doris Lessing's Children of Violence
- Naguib Mahfouz's The Cairo Trilogy
- Thomas Mann's Joseph and His Brothers
- Roger Martin du Gard's Les Thibault
- Yukio Mishima's The Sea of Fertility
- Anaïs Nin's Cities of the Interior
- Benito Pérez Galdós's Episodios nacionales
- Anthony Powell's A Dance to the Music of Time
- Dorothy Richardson's Pilgrimage
- Romain Rolland's Jean-Christophe
- John Roman Baker's "The Nick & Greg Books"
- Philip Roth's "Zuckerman" novels
- Paul Scott's Raj Quartet
- C. P. Snow's Strangers and Brothers
- Anthony Trollope's Chronicles of Barsetshire and Palliser novels
- John Updike's "Rabbit Angstrom" books
- Henry Williamson's A Chronicle of Ancient Sunlight
- A. N. Wilson's Lampitt Papers

== Publishers' nonfiction series ==
Notable nonfiction book series for the general public have included:

- Architecture: Pevsner Architectural Guides
- Biography: The Republic of Letters; Great Lives
- History: History of the Great War
- Science: New Naturalist Library
- Self Instruction: Teach Yourself
- Sport: Badminton Library
- Travel: Murray's Handbooks for Travellers; Blue Guides

== Academic and scholarly publications ==
In scholarly and academic publishing, scientific and non-fiction books that are released serially (in successive parts) once a year, or less often, are also called a series. (Publications that are released more often than once a year are known as periodicals.) The connection among books belonging to such a series can be by discipline, focus, approach, type of work, or geographic location. Examples of such series include the "Antwerp Working Papers in Linguistics", "Early English Manuscripts in Facsimile", "Garland Reference Library", "Canterbury Tales Project", "Early English Text Society", and "Cambridge Companions to Music".

== Compared with editorial collection ==
Book series can be compared with editorial collection, a type of serial publication which is common in the Romance-speaking world, especially in France. Although the two are similar in many ways, book series and editorial collection differ because books in a series generally have a common subject, character, or universe; in other words, a set of volumes that are related to each other by certain thematic elements. While books in a collection do not necessarily have a common subject, or a specific order, but with a certain affinity in the content of books (collections on art, on religion, on science...), as well as in the format, spine and page layout, even grammage, number of pages and style of typeface.

== See also ==
- List of children's book series
- Monographic series
- Partwork
- Sequel
  - Continuation novel
- Tetralogy
- Trilogy
- Volume
