= Jacques Abeille =

French writer (1942–2022)

- Born: Jacques Marie Christophe Abeille; 17 March 1942; Lyon, France
- Died: 23 January 2022 (aged 79); Libourne, France
- Citizenship: French
- Occupations: Novelist; Painter; Poet; Academic
- Children: 3
- Writing career
- Pen name: Léo Barthe; Bartleby; Christoph Aymerr
- Genres: Fantastic; Erotica
- Notable awards: Prix Wepler (2010; lifetime achievement award); Grand prix de l'Imaginaire (2021; special prize)

Jacques Abeille (French pronunciation: [ʒak abɛj]; March 17, 1942 – January 23, 2022) was a French writer. Influenced by the surrealist movement, in which he participated in the 1960s and 1970s, he is best known for the novel cycle Le Cycle des contrées set in an imaginary universe that started with the publication of Jardins statuaires (1982). He has also written several collections of poetry and short stories, and is the author of erotic literature, published in part under the pseudonym Léo Barthe.

Jacques Abeille was born on March 17, 1942, in Lyon. An illegitimate child, he was raised by his paternal uncle after his father's death in 1944. During the 1960s he was part of certain circles in Bordeaux that were related to the surrealist movement. In his early 20s he discovered that he suffered from color blindness and such incapacity prevented him from becoming a painter like he originally intended since childhood. He then decided to become a writer instead, at one point expressing "I am a writer on the basis of [being] a failed painter."

Abeille started his literary career in 1971 with the publication of his first erotic fiction, La Crépusculaire, which he published under the pseudonym "Bartleby." He published various erotic stories throughout his life using different pseudonyms.

In 1982, Abeille published the novel Les Jardins statuaires, which would become the first installment in the novel cycle Le Cycle des contrées, the work for which he is known for in France. This was followed by Le Veilleur du jour in 1986 and seven other books in the series in the following years (the last one, La Vie de l'explorateur perdu, being released in 2020). He has named a number of influences in his overall writing and storytelling including Gérard de Nerval, Blaise Pascal, Leonora Carrington, Jean Ray, Gustav Meyrink, and Julien Gracq.

Abeille originally wanted to study ethnology but he mentioned his economic conditions and the state of the field at the time as the reasons for which he chose psychology instead and in turn leaving that for philosophy. He was a teaching assistant of philosophy for ten years and later passed the competitive agrégation exam in plastic arts, earning admission to full teaching status. His teaching career ended in 2002.

In 2010 Abeille received a lifetime achievement award from the Wepler Prize for his work, as well as the 2015 Jean-Arp Prize for French language literature and the 2021 Grand prix de l'Imaginaire.

== Early life ==
Jacques Abeille was born on March 17, 1942, in the 6th arrondissement of Lyon, the child of an illegitimate relationship. His father, Valentin Abeille (1907-1944) - involved in the French Resistance and opposed to the Vichy regime - was the grandson of a senator sub-prefect. In order to recognize his son (illegal at the time), Valentin Abeille had a family certificate forged by the Resistance network to which he belonged.

After his father's death in 1944, Valentin Abeille's twin brother took in Jacques, raising him "in many ways [...] like the ghost of my father" in the words of the writer.

Once the war was over, Jacques Abeille accompanied his uncle, a high civil servant, to his postings.

After having spent some time in Guadeloupe, the Abeilles settled in Bordeaux in 1959. The shock of the contrast between this city and the seaside environment where he had lived before, associated with literary reminiscences of Kafka's and especially Gustav Meyrink's Prague, was key to the creation of Terrèbre, the capital of the empire of the Contrées, as it appears in Le Veilleur du jour (1986).

== Career ==
=== Adherence to Surrealism ===
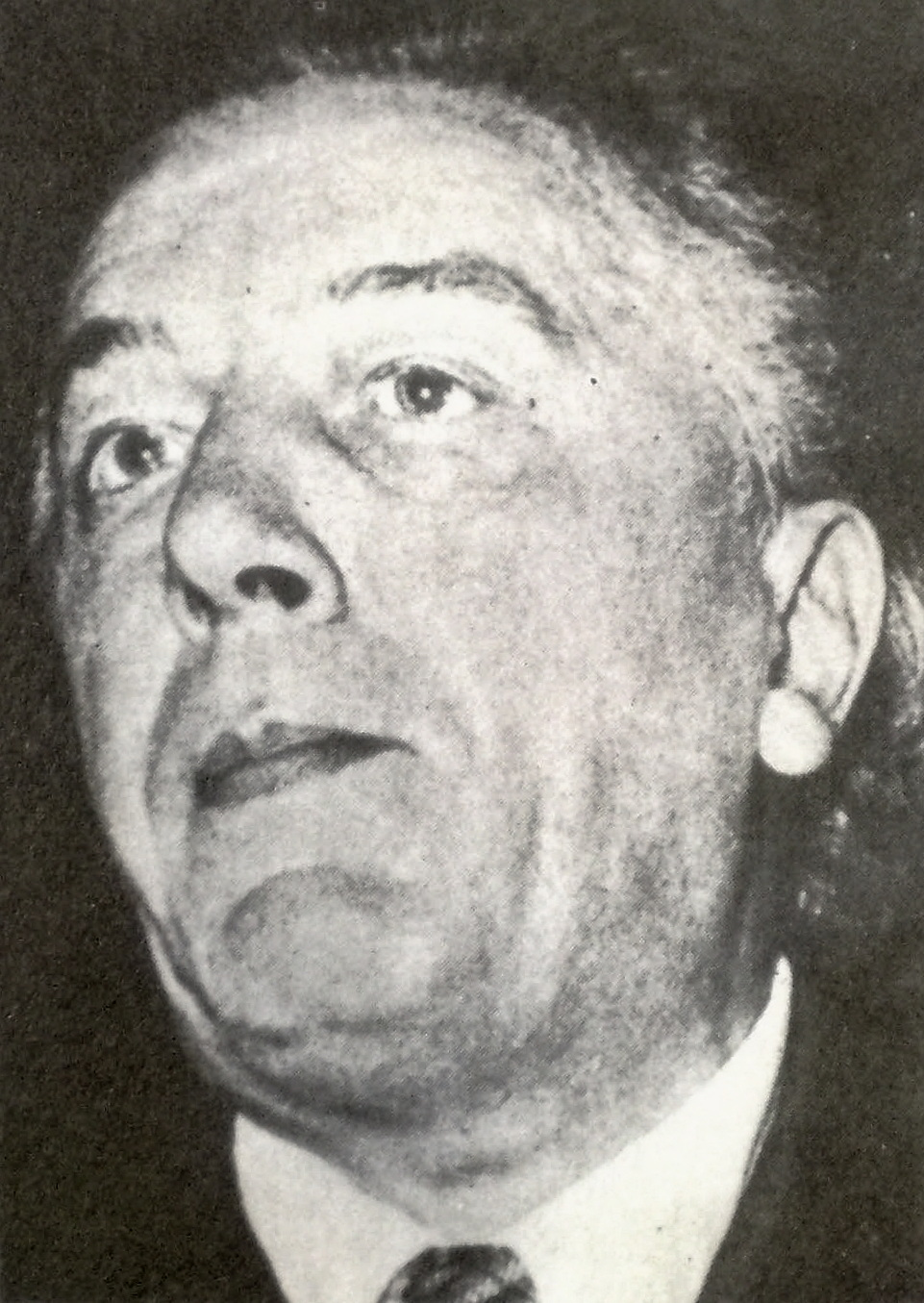
André Breton

Jacques Abeille frequented the literary and artistic circles of Bordeaux connected with surrealism, in particular the Parapluycha movement, led by Pierre Chaveau, the Mimiague brothers and Alain Tartas. He corresponded with André Breton, whose entourage invited him to befriend the painter and photographer Pierre Molinier, living in Bordeaux at the time. Abeille also participated in the work of the surrealist journal La Brèche, founded by Breton in 1961.

In October 1969, three years after the death of André Breton, Jean Schuster declared the end of "historical" Surrealism in "Le Quatrième chant", published in the newspaper Le Monde. Jacques Abeille was one of those who refused to dissolve the group, and he joined the editorial committee of the Bulletin de liaison surréaliste, which was formed around Micheline and Vincent Bounoure and Jean-Louis Bédouin. Jacques Abeille wrote a total of four articles for the ten issues of the journal published between 1970 and 1976.

However, his activity in the surrealist movement left few traces: while he is mentioned in the index of Gérard Durozoi's 1997 Histoire du mouvement surréaliste, as well as in Robert Sabatier's L'Histoire de la poésie française du xxe siècle, where he is mentioned as a surrealist author, he is, on the other hand, absent from the Dictionnaire du surréalisme et de ses environs edited by Adam Biro and René Passeron (1985), as well as from the database of the Mélusine site of the Centre de recherches sur le surréalisme of the University of Paris III.

=== From painting to literature ===
Abeille explains having felt the "throbbing desire to be an artist" from childhood, a desire thwarted by "a confused, indecisive and anxious shyness", an incapacity and vague obstacle. He finds the key to unlock it at the end of adolescence, when at the age of twenty-one or twenty-two, while practicing psychology, Abeille discovers he is color blind. "It was a great crisis and an immense sorrow" explained the author in an interview in 2007, which led him to give up painting and turn to writing: "I am a writer on the basis of a failed painter", he explained to another correspondent.

Abeille's first book was an erotic story entitled La Crépusculaire and published in 1971 under the pseudonym Bartleby by the publisher L'Or du temps, directed by Régine Deforges. The text, written between 1967 and 1968, was in response to a dare between friends to write an erotic work. This experience of writing, whose speed surprised him, opened new perspectives beyond his otherwise disappointing previous attempts to write idealized relationships.

Abeille published thereafter a set of erotic texts, under his own name or under pseudonym, the most frequent and the most constant being that of Léo Barthe, who also appears as a character in his famous cycle of novels.

=== Les Jardins statuaires and the Cycle des Contrées ===
Les Jardins statuaires (1982) is a novel with dual inspiration. First, from an encounter with a gardener working the earth in which he grew squash: seeing the plasticity of these vegetables inspired in Abeille the image of statues emerging from the ground. Superimposed on this is an essay in the form of a philosophical tale about artistic creation, perceived not as a technical process (as would have accorded with literary tradition, represented by Gustave Flaubert for instance), but rather as the artist's accompaniment of an inspiration that pre-existed other works. In the course of writing, noting the absence of women in the tale, which seemed incongruous for a text dealing with artistic inspiration, Abeille came to imagine a story taking place in statuary gardens, from which women, cloistered, are physically excluded, kept as they are in reserved quarters and inaccessible to men or relegated to hotels that are in reality brothels.

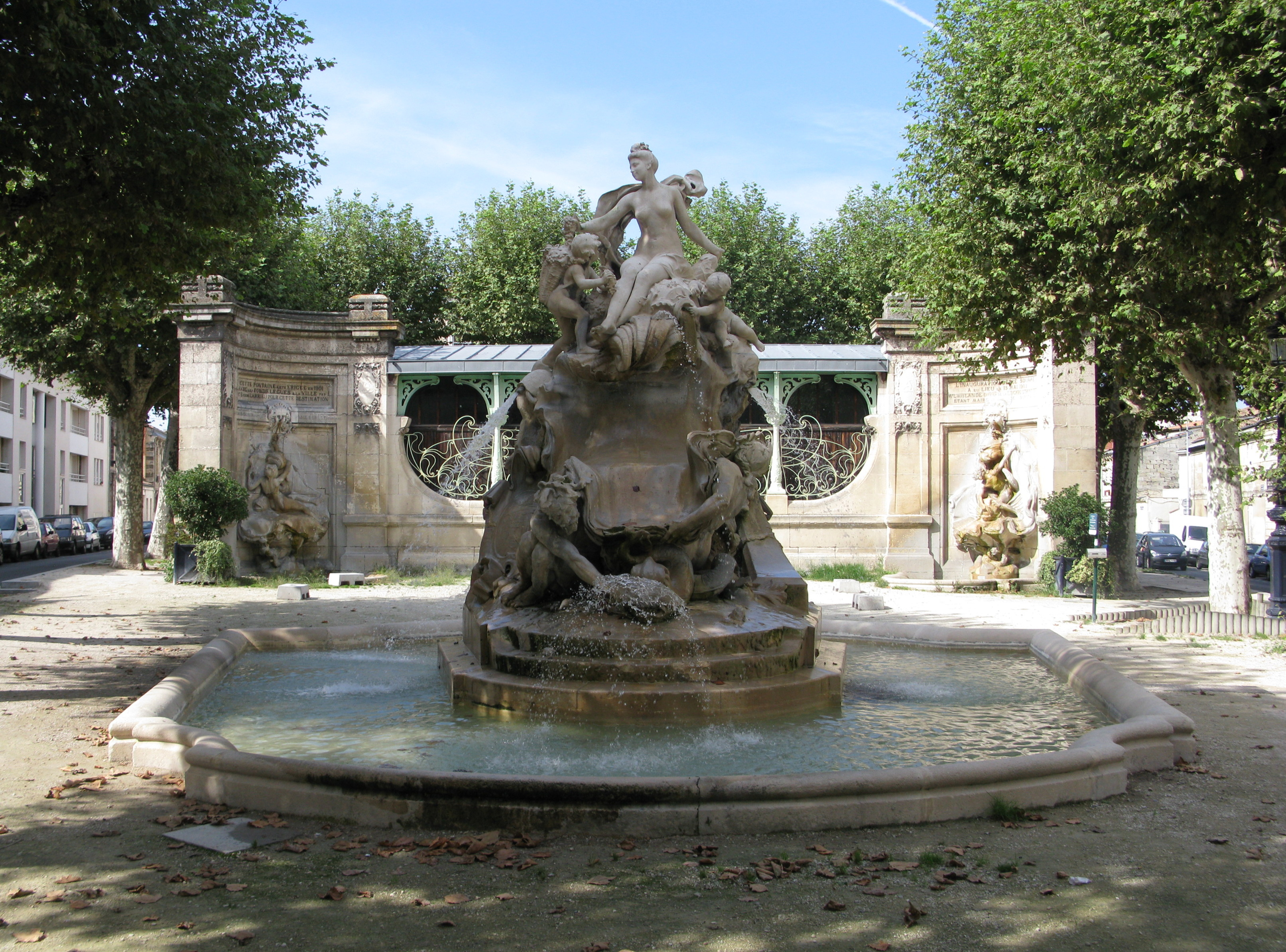
Fountain of the Amédée-Larrieu plaza in Bordeaux

Les Jardins statuaires was to be published by Régine Desforges, with whom the publishing contract had been signed. But the bankruptcy of the publishing house L'Or du temps prevented it. Abeille then entrusts the typescript of the novel to Julien Gracq, who then gives it to José Corti, historical editor of surrealist publications. But the typescript seems to have been lost and never reaches Corti's hands. It is finally Bernard Noël who, several years later, discovers another typed copy of the novel and undertakes to publish it at Flammarion, where he is then editor. But a delay in production of the book hinders its release, which also suffers from the departure of Bernard Noël from his position in 1983. Various other events delay publication of the novel, which inaugurates the Cycle des Contrées, acquiring the status of a cursed novel.

Abeille nevertheless publishes in 1986, still with Flammarion, a second novel: Le Veilleur du jour. Becoming a novelistic cycle, this second instalment is the counterpart of Jardins statuaires: the action of the two novels is more or less simultaneous, and that of the last one is situated at the other end of the empire imagined by Abeille, in the capital city of Terrèbre. A third novel, the first draft of which dates from 1977, evokes the period following the barbarian invasion, in the expectation of which the inhabitants of Terrèbre as well as those of the statuary gardens live. Initially titled Un homme plein de misère, in reference to Pascal's famous formula, it was finally published in 2011 as a double novel: Les Barbares and La Barbarie, published by Attila.

La Clef des ombres, a novel of a significantly different tone from the other novels and short stories, although set in Journelaime, a city in the fictional land, was not included in the cycle for a while, although it was when first published in 1991. After having considered making it the first volume of another novel project entitled "Le Cycle des chambres", La Clef des ombres was finally reintegrated into the "Cycle des contrées" when it was reissued by the Tripode publishing house in 2020, the year in which La Vie de l'explorateur perdu was also published, the last novel of the Cycle des contrées in which Brice Cléton, the protagonist of La Clef des ombres, reappears.

The cycle also includes three collections of short stories: Les Voyages du fils (published for the first time in 2008 and in an expanded edition in 2016), Les Chroniques scandaleuses de Terrèbre (1995), a collection of erotic short stories signed by Léo Barthe and featuring the characters of Le Veilleur du jour, and finally Les Carnets de l'explorateur perdu, published for the first time in 1993 and then in 2020 in an expanded edition. In addition, two shorter texts, "La Grande danse de la réconciliation", whose narrator is the same as that of the short stories in Voyages du fils (2016) and which was then included in the new edition of Les Carnets de l'explorateur perdu, as well as Les Mers perdues (2010) are included in the cycle.

=== Late recognition ===
The work of Abeille has long remained little-known. The author even called himself an obscure writer, a situation all the more ironic since the texts of the Cycle des Contrées thematize this obscurity, since they stage, after their writing and publication, their own disappearance through destruction, oblivion or censorship. This situation changed in 2010, when publisher Attila undertook to reissue the novels of the cycle and, struck by the proximity they detected between Abeille and the Belgian cartoonist and scenographer François Schuiten, the publishers contacted him and offered to illustrate the cover. After reading the novel, Schuiten accepted and even proposed that Abeille write a text to accompany a series of unpublished drawings. This collaboration gave birth to Les Mers perdues, considered by Abeille as a coda to the Cycle des Contrées. It is the simultaneous publication of the two works, the one elaborated with Schuiten and the reedition of Les Jardins statuaires, which according to Abeille allowed his work to emerge from the obscurity in which it had been confined until then.

As a sign of this recognition, in 2010 Abeille received a special mention from the Wepler Prize for the whole of his work, also rewarded in 2015 by the Jean-Arp Prize for French-language literature and in 2021 by the Grand prix de l'Imaginaire.

=== Professional career ===
After having begun studies in ethnology, Jacques Abeille pursued studies in psychology and then in philosophy, a subject that he taught for ten years as a teaching assistant, and later passed the competitive agrégation exam in plastic arts, earning admission to full teaching status. His teaching career, which he describes as that of a "banal provincial teacher", was the desire of a "man who, against the singularity of his birth, fights all his life to achieve a banal existence: to exercise a profession without ambition, to constitute a solid couple, to have children and to pamper them." A smooth existence requiring efforts that, to be bearable, had to be tempered by "the need to cultivate a secret garden", which took for Abeille, once painting was abandoned, the form of writing.

Abeille's teaching career ended in 2002.

== Writing ==
=== On the edge of the French aesthetic and authorial tradition ===
In his speech written in 2015 on the occasion of the Jean-Arp Prize for French Language Literature, Abeille specified what, in his opinion, differentiates his aesthetic from what he considered dominant in France since the classical period, exemplarily embodied by Nicolas Boileau's L'Art poétique: the fundamental value given to verisimilitude - of which propriety is a corollary - is assimilated to a censorship rejected by Abeille, noting that this work is situated outside of all verisimilitude, places its action in an indeterminate time and does not even care to maintain a unity of action. This refusal to be "on the same level" as Abeille is not a reason for the author to be in the same position. According to Abeille, the refusal to register "on the ground of reality" and to mark "against the dictatorship of the verisimilitude and the novelistic canvas" explain why his books "took so much time before collecting a weak echo." Recalling a remark by Gaëtan Picon on this subject, Abeille explains in a 2013 interview that works of pure imagination are only well received in France if written by foreign authors, such as Alice in Wonderland (1865) by Lewis Carroll or Gulliver's Travels (1726) by Jonathan Swift.

Stylistically, Abeille's absence of litotes, favored by classical authors, and the overabundant presence of redundancy, banished by these same writers, signal another point of divergence from what Abeille calls "the dominant ideology in France."

Another element of this aesthetic is constituted by the way in which the writer's work is envisaged in Boileau: comparable to a sculptor, his task is to give shape to the raw, uneven, totally shapeless material that constitutes the product of the imagination, before polishing which, by removing roughness, is supposed to give beauty to the finished work. This vision of writing, which for Abeille is embodied by the auctorial figure of Flaubert, consists "at least as much, if not more, in subtracting than in adding." Now, not only was the novel Les Jardins statuaires conceived against this idea of the omnipotence of work to the detriment of the imagination, since it was a question of defending the primacy of inspiration over style considered as a set of technical procedures in the form of a philosophical tale, but also Abeille's practice of writing is at the opposite end of the spectrum. Explaining that, for him, writing is "being seized by a kind of state of alienation", which leads him to write "always at the edge of the pen", Abeille invokes the image of LP records to explain his approach: "I choose a groove and I follow it patiently, setting a tone for myself. That's how the elements emerge and come together. Afterwards, there is very little rewriting" and "I am not in control, but in the capture of a flow".

This creative process, which places the writer at the service of inspiration rather than seeing him as a demiurge creator, leads to the writing of texts sometimes much longer than expected (Les Jardins statuaires was originally envisaged as a fable of about fifty pages), sometimes interrupted without the images appearing "secreting an interstitial tissue that draws them together into a narrative"; these images which "remain, being sufficient to themselves, in their disparate state" are named by Abeille his "more or less broken proses."

=== The refusal of committed literature and autofiction ===
Abeille explains his refusal of committed literature: "as a writer, I don't want to have anything to do with power", noting that this literature "accommodates autocratic regimes very well". However, faithful to the postulates of surrealism, Abeille concedes that because literature feeds readers' imaginations, possesses a contesting value that acts according to a proper temporality that is not political, since "imagination is the first step in dissidence".

Any form of autofiction is also rejected by Abeille who, while recognizing that an author such as Annie Ernaux has remarkable writing, considers that "the self is a confinement." In the works of Abeille, on the contrary, the figure of the authorial self tends to disappear. This disappearance, thematized in his books whose narrators are without name or past (Les Jardins statuaires and Les Barbares), or wear an illusory identity (Le Veilleur du jour and Les Voyages du fils), is like that of their author. As Arnaud Laimé explains, he "refuses to think of himself as an individualized figure, recognized by all, who would be capable of producing texts over which he would exercise an authority" and instead strives to "efface himself to let the text come to life".

=== Literary influences and comparisons ===
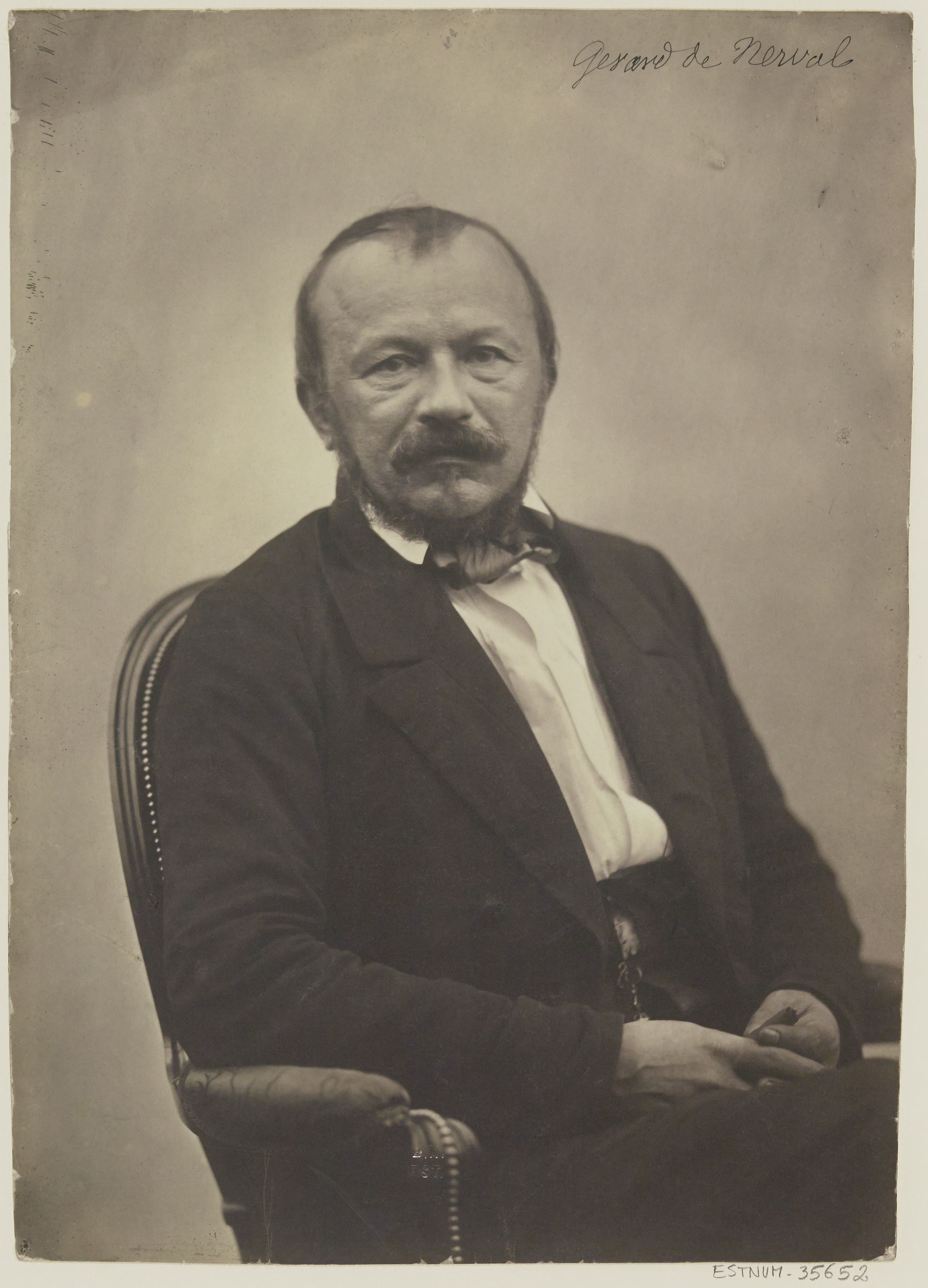
Gérard de Nerval photographed by Félix Nadar

Abeille describes various influences, the most prominent being that of Gérard de Nerval, to whom Le Veilleur du jour is dedicated and to whom he is described as "the most intimate friend". Charles Duits, another writer from Surrealism, with whom Abeille had a close relationship and whose conception of writing as dictation is reminiscent of that of Abeille, is also considered a "tutelary power" in the same way as Nerval.

In a non-exhaustive list of influences confessed by the author during various interviews, Daniel Launay also mentions the names of George du Maurier, Julien Gracq, Jean Ray, Wilhelm Jensen, Blaise Pascal, Alain-Pierre Pillet and Gustav Meyrink. Certain figures gravitating in the surrealist orbit are also cited by Abeille as having contributed decisively to his entry into writing: "If I am a storyteller," he explains in a 2000 interview, "it is to Gisèle Prassinos, Leonora Carrington, Greta Knutson or Nora Mitrani that I owe it".

As far as the Cycle des contrées is concerned, the most frequently mentioned comparisons are, for obvious thematic reasons, with Gracq and Dino Buzzati, both of whom described the dull oppressive climate that the expectation of an increasingly probable and imminent barbarian invasion brings to bear on an imaginary country. J. R. R. Tolkien is also mentioned, Abeille having been described by Pascal Maillard (coordinator of the Jean Arp Prize for French Literature) as "Tolkien who would have been able to write in the language of Proust, Breton or Gracq. "Anne Besson, for her part, has compared some of the procedures used by Abeille (practice of hyperonyms, fictional mise en abyme, etc.) to those used by Antoine Volodine, and the ethno-anthropological concern that animates the narrators of the Cycle des Contrées to the anthropologist's approach to the secondary worlds of its creation by Ursula K. Le Guin.

=== The erotic work and the "hyponym" Léo Barthe ===
An important part of Abeille's work consists of erotic and pornographic texts. Abeille explained that the objective of such texts, besides exploring the "dark continent" of femininity, consists in "making language do what it is not made for," bringing it closer to sensation, as language that usually designates not things themselves, but the ideas of things (as explained by Ferdinand de Saussure's theory of the arbitrariness of the sign). From this point of view, the "challenge" of pornographic literature, which consists in "bringing language back from the concept to sensation" is not fundamentally different from the function that the author assigns to poetry.

While some of these texts are published under the name of Jacques Abeille, others are published under the pseudonym Léo Barthe, which Abeille prefers to describe as a "hyponym". This name is also one of the characters in the Cycle des Contrées, an author of pornographic works who finds himself in possession of the testimonies collected by Molavoine, the policeman who watches Barthélémy Lécriveur, central character of the novel Le Veilleur du jour. He then publishes them, accompanied by a text of his own composition, under the title of Chroniques scandaleuses de Terrèbre. This collection of short stories, which was to play a role in the fiction as one of the elements in the trial of the nameless master of La Barbarie, was published in 1995 under the name of the "hyponym" Léo Barthe, who thus belongs to both the extradigetic and the intradigetic universe in the Cycle des Contrées.

== Private life ==
Abeille was married and had three children.

== Work ==
Most of Abeille's works have been published in a very scattered way, by several publishers or in sometimes confidential magazines and fanzines. In addition to re-editions of collections, whose contents can vary, and the collective works on which Jacques Abeille collaborated, the latter signed several texts under pseudonym. The most constant and recurrent is that of Léo Barthe (in principle reserved for the publication of works of an erotic nature), but he also published under the pseudonym of Bartleby as well as under that of Christoph Aymerr (or Aymeric). The most complete bibliography to date, although not exhaustive according to its author, is that established by Arnaud Laimé and which appears in the work devoted to Jacques Abeille Le Dépossédé.

=== Le Cycle des contrées ===
- Les Jardins statuaires (1982)
- Le Veilleur du jour (1986)
- La Clef des ombres (1991)
- Les Voyages du Fils (2008)
- Chroniques scandaleuses de Terrèbre (2008)
- Les Mers perdues (2010)
- Les Barbares (2011)
- La Barbarie (2011)
- La Grande Danse de la réconciliation (2016)
- La Vie de l'explorateur perdu (2020)
