= Eugénie de Guérin =

French writer

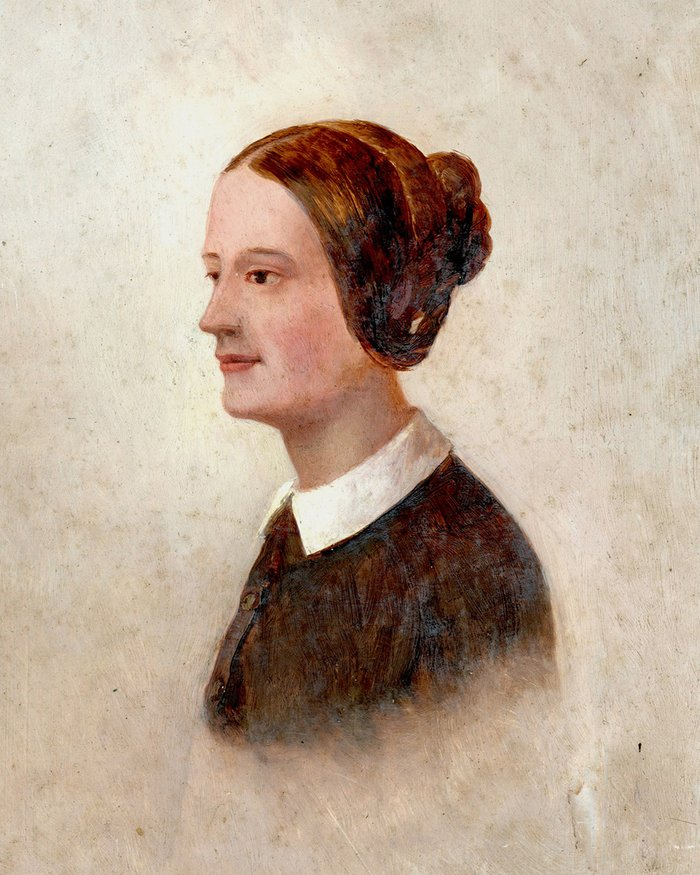
Portrait of Eugénie de Guérin by Arsène Pelegry

Eugénie de Guérin (French pronunciation: [øʒeni də ɡeʁɛ̃]; 29 January 1805 – 31 May 1848) was a French writer and the sister of the poet Maurice de Guérin.

Her Journals (1861, Eng. trans., 1865) and her Lettres (1864, Eng. trans., 1865) indicated the possession of gifts of as rare an order as those of her brother, though of a somewhat different kind. In her case mysticism assumed a form more strictly religious, and she continued to mourn her brother's loss of his early Catholic faith. Five years older than he, she cherished a love for him which was blended with a somewhat motherly anxiety. After his death she began the collection and publication of the scattered fragments of his writings. She died, however, before her task was completed.

See Sainte-Beuve, Causeries du lundi (vol. xii.) and Nouveaux Lundis (vol. iii.); G Merlet, Causeries sur les femmes et les hIres (Paris, 1865); Selden, L'Esprit des femmes de notre temps (Paris, 1864); Marelle, Eugénie et Maurice de Guérin (Berlin, 1869); Harriet Parr, M. and E. de Guérin, a monograph (London, 1870); and Matthew Arnold's essays on Maurice and Eugénie de Guérin, in his Essays in Criticism.

== Suggested reading ==
- Guérin, Eugénie de. Journal of Eugénie de Guérin. 1865. Ed. G.S. Trébutien. Whitefish, MT: Kessinger Publishing, 2005. ISBN 1-4179-5334-9
- Raoul, Valerie. "Women's Diaries as Life-Savings: Who Decides Whose Life is Saved? The Journals of Eugénie de Guérin and Elisabeth Leseur." Biography 24:1 (Winter 2001): 140–151.
- Summers, Mary. Eugénie de Guérin: A Life of Reaction. Lewiston, NY: Edwin Mellen Press, 1997. ISBN 0-7734-8530-9
