= The Land of Far-Beyond =

1942 children's novel by Enid Blyton

- First edition
- Author: Enid Blyton
- Illustrator: Horace J Knowles
- Language: English
- Genre: Children's; Fantasy
- Publisher: Methuen Publishing
- Publication date: 1942
- Publication place: England
- Media type: Print
- Pages: 163
- OCLC: 1008111451

The Land of Far-Beyond is a children's novel written by Enid Blyton, illustrated by Horace J Knowles, and published in England in 1942. It is a Christian allegory loosely modelled on John Bunyan's The Pilgrim's Progress (1678).

A boy named Peter and his two sisters, Anna and Patience, travel from the City of Turmoil to the City of Happiness in the Land of Far-Beyond, carrying the heavy burdens of their bad deeds on their backs. With them are two other children, Lily and John, and five adults—Mr Scornful, Mr Fearful, Dick Cowardly, Gracie Grumble and Sarah Simple. They have been warned to keep to the narrow path but they are beset by troubles and temptations on the way, causing them to stray from the path and into danger. Although Peter and his sisters finally make it to the City of Happiness, their companions do not. However the book also hints that Mr Scornful, carrying the worst bad deeds of all, who failed at the gate to the City of Happiness, continues to fight until the end (taking the narrow path to a different entrance) unlike the previous adults and children that failed. Most characters stray to the path that is like their name.
