= Little Black Classics =

Classical Literature short books

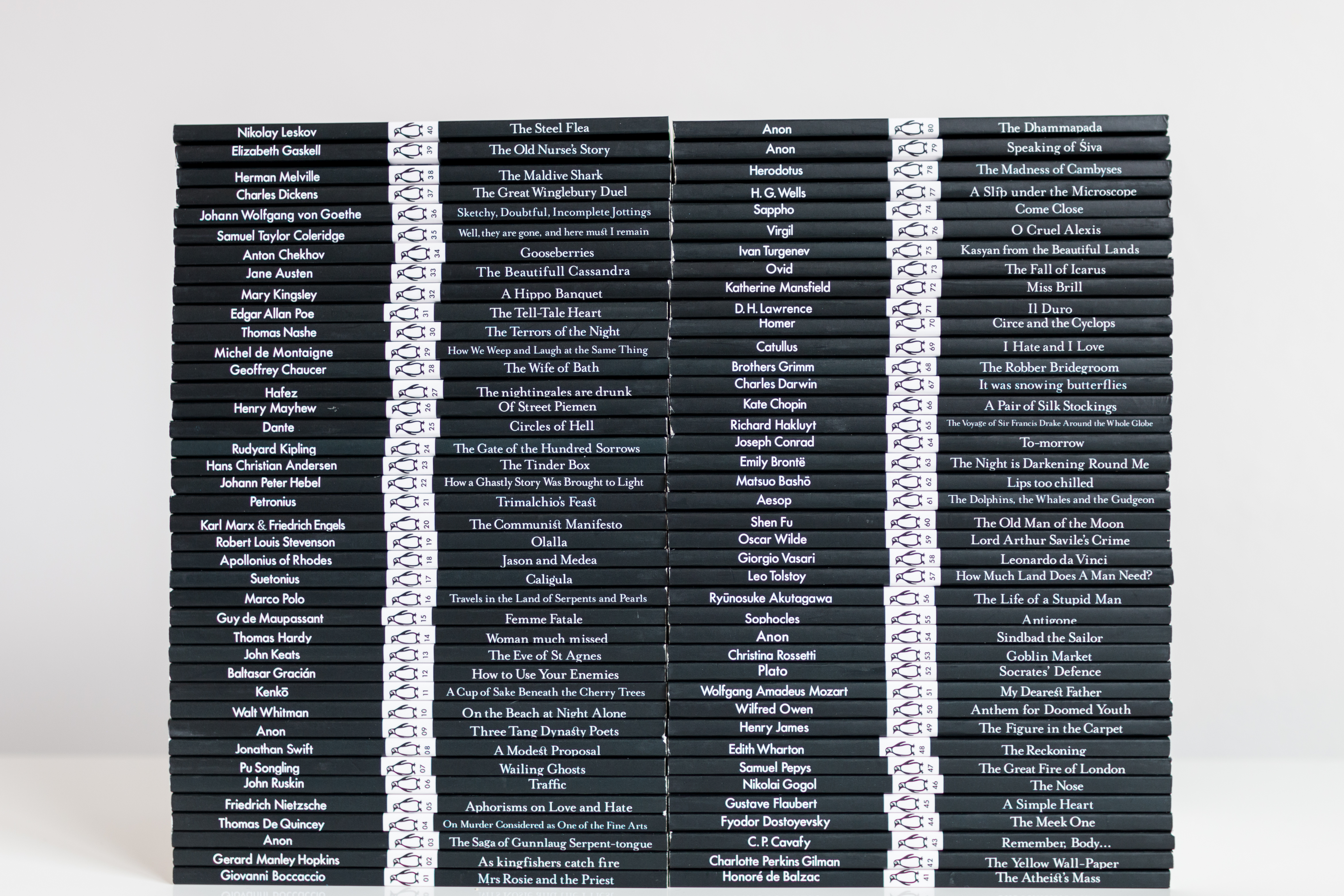
- Collection of the Little Black Classics series
- Country: United Kingdom
- Language: English
- Publisher: Penguin Books
- Media type: Print (paperback)
- No. of books: 128
- Website: www.littleblackclassics.com

Little Black Classics is a series of short books published by Penguin Books, consisting of complete or extracts from books considered to be classics. Penguin Books has published 128 in total.

== Books ==
01. Mrs Rosie and the Priest - Giovanni Boccaccio
02. As kingfishers catch fire - Gerard Manley Hopkins
03. The Saga of Gunnlaug Serpent-tongue - Anon
04. On Murder Considered as One of the Fine Arts - Thomas De Quincey
05. Aphorisms on Love and Hate - Friedrich Nietzsche
06. Traffic - John Ruskin
07. Wailing Ghosts - Pu Songling
08. A Modest Proposal - Jonathan Swift
09. Three Tang Dynasty Poets - Anon
10. On the Beach at Night Alone - Walt Whitman
11. A Cup of Sake Beneath the Cherry Trees - Kenkō
12. How to Use Your Enemies - Baltasar Gracián
13. The Eve of St Agnes - John Keats
14. Woman Much Missed - Thomas Hardy
15. Femme Fatale - Guy de Maupassant
16. Travels in the Land of Serpents and Pearls - Marco Polo
17. Caligula - Suetonius
18. Jason and Medea - Apollonius of Rhodes
19. Olalla - Robert Louis Stevenson
20. The Communist Manifesto - Karl Marx and Friedrich Engels
21. Trimalchio's Feast - Petronius
22. How a Ghastly Story Was Brought to Light - Johann Peter Hebel
23. The Tinder Box - Hans Christian Andersen
24. The Gate of the Hundred Sorrows - Rudyard Kipling
25. Circles of Hell - Dante
26. Of Street Piemen - Henry Mayhew
27. The nightingales are drunk - Hafez
28. The Wife of Bath - Geoffrey Chaucer
29. How We Weep and Laugh at the Same Thing - Michel de Montaigne
30. The Terrors of the Night - Thomas Nashe
31. The Tell-Tale Heart - Edgar Allan Poe
32. A Hippo Banquet - Mary Kingsley
33. The Beautifull Cassandra - Jane Austen
34. Gooseberries - Anton Chekhov
35. Well, they are gone, and here must I remain - Samuel Taylor Coleridge
36. Sketchy, Doubtful, Incomplete Jottings - Johann Wolfgang von Goethe
37. The Great Winglebury Duel - Charles Dickens
38. The Maldive Shark - Herman Melville
39. The Old Nurse's Story - Elizabeth Gaskell
40. The Steel Flea - Nikolay Leskov
41. The Atheist's Mass - Honoré de Balzac
42. The Yellow Wall-Paper - Charlotte Perkins Gilman
43. Remember, Body... - C.P. Cavafy
44. The Meek One - Fyodor Dostoevsky
45. A Simple Heart - Gustave Flaubert
46. The Nose - Gogol
47. The Great Fire of London - Samuel Pepys
48. The Reckoning - Edith Wharton
49. The Figure in the Carpet - Henry James
50. Anthem for Doomed Youth - Wilfred Owen
51. My Dearest Father - Wolfgang Amadeus Mozart
52. Socrates' Defence - Plato
53. Goblin Market - Christina Rossetti
54. Sindbad the Sailor - Anon
55. Antigone - Sophocles
56. The Life of a Stupid Man - Ryūnosuke Akutagawa
57. How Much Land Does a Man Need? - Leo Tolstoy
58. Leonardo da Vinci - Giorgio Vasari
59. Lord Arthur Savile's Crime - Oscar Wilde
60. The Old Man of the Moon - Shen Fu
61. The Dolphins, the Whales and the Gudgeon - Aesop
62. Lips too chilled - Matsuo Bashō
63. The Night is Darkening Round Me - Emily Brontë
64. To-morrow - Joseph Conrad
65. The Voyage of Sir Francis Drake Around the Whole Globe - Richard Hakluyt
66. A Pair of Silk Stockings - Kate Chopin
67. It was snowing butterflies - Charles Darwin
68. The Robber Bridegroom - Brothers Grimm
69. I Hate and I Love - Catullus
70. Circe and the Cyclops - Homer
71. Il Duro - D. H. Lawrence
72. Miss Brill - Katherine Mansfield
73. The Fall of Icarus - Ovid
74. Come Close - Sappho
75. Kasyan from the Beautiful Lands - Ivan Turgenev
76. O Cruel Alexis - Virgil
77. A Slip under the Microscope - H. G. Wells
78. The Madness of Cambyses - Herodotus
79. Speaking of Śiva - Anon
80. The Dhammapada - Anon
81. Lady Susan - Jane Austen
82. The Body Politic - Jean-Jacques Rousseau
83. The World is Full of Foolish Men - Jean de la Fontaine
84. The Sea Raiders - H.G. Wells
85. Hannibal - Livy
86. To Be Read at Dusk - Charles Dickens
87. The Death of Ivan Ilyich - Leo Tolstoy
88. The Stolen White Elephant - Mark Twain
89. Tyger, Tyger - William Blake
90. Green Tea - Sheridan Le Fanu
91. The Yellow Book - Various
92. Kidnapped - Olaudah Equiano
93. A Modern Detective - Edgar Allan Poe
94. The Suffragettes - Various
95. How To Be a Medieval Woman - Margery Kempe
96. Typhoon - Joseph Conrad
97. The Nun of Murano - Giacomo Casanova
98. A terrible beauty is born - W. B. Yeats
99. The Withered Arm - Thomas Hardy
100. Nonsense - Edward Lear
101. The Frogs - Aristophanes
102. Why I Am so Clever - Friedrich Nietzsche
103. Letters to a Young Poet - Rainer Maria Rilke
104. Seven Hanged - Leonid Andreyev
105. Oroonoko - Aphra Behn
106. O frabjous day! - Lewis Carroll
107. Trivia: or, the Art of Walking the Streets of London - John Gay
108. The Sandman - E. T. A. Hoffmann
109. Love that moves the sun and other stars - Dante
110. The Queen of Spades - Alexander Pushkin
111. A Nervous Breakdown - Anton Chekhov
112. The Book of Tea - Kakuzo Okakura
113. Is this a dagger which I see before me? - William Shakespeare
114. My life had stood a loaded gun - Emily Dickinson
115. Daphnis and Chloe - Longus
116. Matilda - Mary Shelley
117. The Lifted Veil - George Eliot
118. White Nights - Fyodor Dostoyevsky
119. Only Dull People Are Brilliant at Breakfast - Oscar Wilde
120. Flush - Virginia Woolf
121. Lot No. 249 - Arthur Conan Doyle
122. The Rule of Benedict - Benedict of Nursia
123. Rip Van Winkle - Washington Irving
124. Anecdotes of the Cynics - Anon
125. Waterloo - Victor Hugo
126. Stancliffe's Hotel - Charlotte Brontë
127. The Constitution of the United States - Founding Fathers
128. The Vampyre - John Polidori
