= Veronese (typeface) =

Veronese (series 59) was a typeface of the Monotype company in the UK made to be used for type casting in hot metal typography

It was cut in 1911 for the publisher J. M. Dent, the owner of the Everyman's Library. It was based on another foundry-type made for this publisher. Both founts were based on an old Venetian roman type made by Nicolas Jenson. The typeface was launched in 1912 in a collection of the poems of Lorenzo De Medici which was published by Ballantyne Press. This font was also the basis for William Morris and his Golden Type. Dent admired Morris and his Golden type, and the way Morris tried to implement his ideas on printing. Dent however wanted to use machines to produce the type for his trade editions for his Everyman's Library. In this way he was able to take Morris's socialist principles in a more practical way, compared with the bibliophile editions of the Klemscott press.

The font Monotype produced was almost a copy of Golden Type, but with sharper slab serifs, and cleaner lines. A lighter version was produced in 1919 after the First World War, with bracketed serifs, and named Italian Old Style series 108. In 1967 Series 59 was taken out of production and all patterns, designs and punches were destroyed. After this date no new mats could be made, although Series 108 is still available. However, several digital fonts based on Veronese are currently available.
