= Le Cycle des contrées =

Novel series by Jacques Abeille

- Author: Jacques Abeille
- Cover artist: François Schuiten (Le Tripode)
- Country: France
- Language: French
- Genre: novel
- Publisher: Flammarion; Ginkgo éditeur; Deleatur; Le Tripode
- Published: 1982–2020
- No. of books: nearly 10 novels (counts vary), short story collections

Le Cycle des contrées (The Cycle of Countries) is a novel series by Jacques Abeille, published between the early 1980s and 2020. Apart from novels, it also includes a number of short stories. The series is set in imaginary countries. At the center of these imaginary territories, the Empire of Terrèbre and its eponymous capital are the setting for the second and, in part, the third novel on the series. The series was republished in five volumes by Le Tripode, with the final installment released in October 2020.

== Novels ==
- Les Jardins statuaires (Flammarion, 1982; reissued by Joëlle Losfeld, 2004; reissued by Attila, 2010; reissued by Le Tripode, 2016; reissued by New York Review Books, 2027)
- Le Veilleur du jour (Flammarion, 1986; reissued by Ginkgo éditeur/Deleatur, 2007; reissued by Le Tripode, 2015)
- La Clef des ombres (Zulma, 1991; reissued by Le Tripode, 2020)
- Les Voyages du fils (Ginkgo éditeur/Deleatur, 2008; reissued by Le Tripode, 2016).
- Les Chroniques scandaleuses de Terrèbre (under the pseudonym Léo Barthe, Ginkgo éditeur/Deleatur, 2008)
- Les Barbares (Attila, 2011)
- La Barbarie (Attila, 2011)
- La Vie de l'explorateur perdu (2020)

== Short stories ==
- Les Carnets de l'explorateur perdu (Ombres, 1993)
- Louvanne (Deleatur, 1999)
- L'Écriture du désert (Deleatur, 2003)

== Illustrated books ==
- Les Mers perdues (in collaboration with François Schuiten, illustrated, Attila, 2010)
- La grande danse de la réconciliation (short story, illustrated by Gérard Puel, Le Tripode, 2016)

== Awards ==
Le Cycle des contrées won a special mention in the 2010 Wepler Prize. In 2021, it won the Grand prix de l'Imaginaire (Special Prize).
