= Élisabeth Leseur =

French mystic (1866–1914)

Servant of God Élisabeth Arrighi Leseur
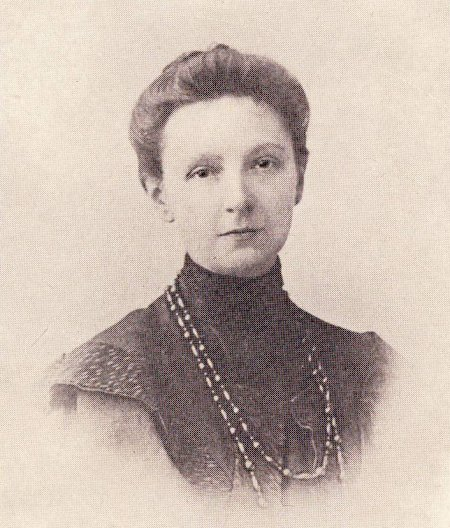
- Portrait of Élisabeth Leseur
- Born: Pauline Élisabeth Arrighi; 16 October 1866; Paris, France
- Died: 3 May 1914 (aged 47); Paris, France

Élisabeth Arrighi Leseur (16 October 1866 – 3 May 1914), born Pauline Élisabeth Arrighi, was a French mystic best known for her spiritual diary and the conversion of her husband, Félix Leseur (1861–1950), a medical doctor and well known leader of the French anti-clerical, atheistic movement. The cause for the beatification of Élisabeth Leseur was opened in 1934. Her current status in the process is that of a Servant of God.

== Life ==
Élisabeth was born in Paris to a wealthy bourgeois French family of Corsican descent. She had had hepatitis as a child, and it recurred throughout her life with attacks of varying severity. Well-to-do by birth and marriage, she was a part of a social group that was cultured, educated, and generally antireligious. The attachment of the couple was strong, though overshadowed by the childlessness of the marriage and their ever-growing religious disagreement.

Rather conventionally religious in her younger years, Élisabeth Leseur was prompted by the attacks of her husband against Christianity and religion to probe deeper into her faith. She thus underwent a religious conversion at the age of thirty-two. From this time on, she saw her major task in praying for the conversion of her husband, while remaining patient with his constant attacks on her faith.

When she was able, she worked on charitable projects for poor families and funded other charitable activities. Largely unknown by her husband, she had a vast spiritual correspondence for many years. She was concerned about the "poor" or the "least," but her deteriorating health restricted her ability to respond to this concern. In 1907 her health deteriorated to the extent that she was forced to lead a primarily sedentary life, receiving visitors and directing her household from a chaise longue. In 1911 she had surgery and radiation for a malignant tumor, recovered, and then was bedridden by July 1913. She died from generalized cancer in May 1914.

== Spirituality ==
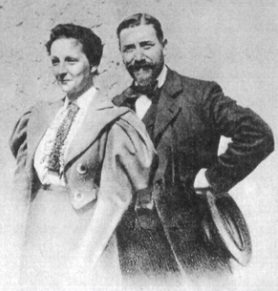
Élisabeth and Félix Leseur in 1910

From the beginning, she organized her spiritual life around a disciplined pattern of prayer, meditation, reading, sacramental practice, and writing. Charity was the organizing principle of her asceticism. In her approach to mortification, she followed Saint Francis de Sales, who recommended moderation and internal, hidden strategies instead of external practices.

== Legacy ==
After her death, her husband found a note by her addressed to himself, that prophesied about his conversion and him becoming a priest. In order to get rid of such "superstition", Félix left for the Marian shrine of Lourdes, wanting to expose the reports of the healings there as fake. At the Lourdes grotto however, he experienced a religious conversion. Félix subsequently published his wife's journal, Journal et pensées pour chaque jour; and due to its favorable reception, a year later in 1918, published some of his wife's letters under the title of Lettres sur la souffrance.

In 1924 Fulton J. Sheen, who would later become an archbishop and popular American television and radio figure, made a retreat under the direction of Fr. Leseur. During many hours of spiritual direction, Sheen learned of the life of Élisabeth and the conversion of Félix. Sheen subsequently repeated this conversion story in many of his presentations.

A cause for Leseur's beatification was formally opened on 2 July 1951, granting her the title of Servant of God.

== Sources ==
- Duhamelet, Genevieve. Élisabeth Leseur, 1866–1914; le miracle de l'amour chrétien. Paris: Lethielleux, 1959.
- Leseur, Élisabeth . The Secret Diary of Élisabeth Leseur: The Woman Whose Goodness Changed Her Husband from Atheist to Priest. Manchester, NH: Sophia Institute Press, 2002. ISBN 1-928832-48-2
- — —. Selected Writings. Ed. and trans. Janet K. Ruffing. Mahwah, NJ: Paulist Press, 2005. ISBN 0-8091-4329-1
- Maas, Robin. A Marriage Saved in Heaven: Elisabeth Leseur's Life of Love
- Raoul, Valerie. "Women's Diaries as Life-Savings: Who Decides Whose Life is Saved? The Journals of Eugénie de Guérin and Elisabeth Leseur." Biography 24:1 (Winter 2001): 140-151.
- MacNeil, JJ. Elisabeth Leseur: Servant of God
