= Harriet Parr =

English novelist and children's writer (1828–1900)

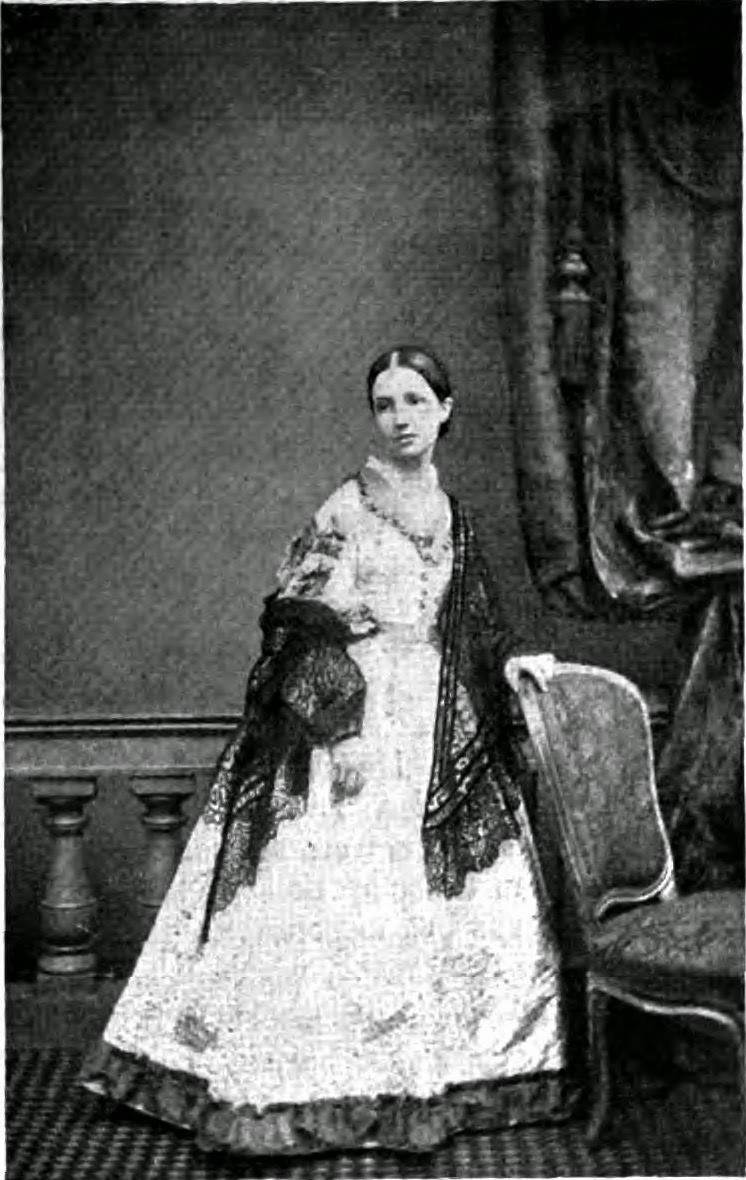
Harriet Parr, circa 1850s

Harriet Parr (1828–1900) was an English author of the Victorian era, who wrote under the pseudonym Holme Lee. She also wrote stories for children.

== Biography ==
The daughter of a commercial traveller, Parr was born in the English city of York on 31 January 1828. She never married and worked first as a governess before finding success as a writer with her first book, Maude Talbot, in 1854. From then until 1883, Parr produced about one novel a year, all published by the London firm Smith, Elder & Co., under the pen name Holme Lee. Charles Dickens, having enjoyed one of Parr's early books, bought three stories from her for the Christmas numbers of his weekly magazines. One included a hymn that would later be republished in several Protestant hymnals in Britain and the United States. Parr also wrote several volumes of fairy tales for children and some works of non-fiction, most of the latter under her real name.

She lived for many years at Shanklin on the Isle of Wight, where she died on 18 February 1900.

== Reception ==
Although Parr is now almost forgotten, like many Victorian authors, her books sold well and were generally well reviewed in her lifetime. Many went through more than one edition and several were also published in America. At least one was picked up by the Leipzig firm of Bernhard Tauchnitz, which specialized in inexpensive English-language editions for travellers.

Aiding Parr's success was that she was a favorite author of the founder of Victorian London's largest lending library, Charles Edward Mudie, "to whose sense of decency her fiction strictly conformed with its depictions of shy maidens and their decent love problems."

== Writings ==
- Maude Talbot, 3 vols. (1854)
- Gilbert Massenger (1855)
- Thorney Hall: A Story of an Old Family (1855)
- "The Poor Pensioner," Household Words (1855), extra Christmas number (uncredited)
- Kathie Brande; A Fireside History of a Quiet Life, 3 vols. (1856; reissued 1860, 1869; New York, 1857)
- Poor Dick's Story in "Beguilement of the Boats," Household Words (1856), extra Christmas number (uncredited)
- Sylvan Holt’s Daughter, 3 vols. (London, 1858, reissued 1865; New York, 1885)
- Against Wind and Tide, 3 vols. (London, 1859, reissued 1862, 1869)
- Hawksview: A Family History of Our Own Times (1859; New York, 1860)
- Legends from Fairy Land: narrating the History of Prince Glee and Princess Trill (1860)
- The Wortlebank Fiary, and Some Old Stories from Kathie Brande’s Portfolio, 3 vols. (1860)
- "The Club-Night" (with Charles Dickens, Charles Alston Collins, Robert Buchanan, H. F. Chorley, and Amelia B. Edwards), All the Year Round (1860), extra Christmas number
- Warp and Woof; or, The Reminiscences of Doris Fletcher, 3 vols. (1861)
- The Wonderful Adventures of Tuflongbo and His Elfin Company, in Their Journey with Little Content through the Rnchanted Forest (1861)
- Tuflongbo's Journey in search of Ogres (1862)
- Annis Warleigh's Fortunes, 3 vols. (1863)
- In the Silver Age: Essays — that is, Dispersed Meditations, 2 vols. (1864; reissued 1865, 1866, 1877)
- The Life and Death of Jeanne d’Arc, called the Maid, 2 vols. (1866) (as Harriet Parr)
- Mr. Wynyard’s Ward, 2 vols. (1867)
- Basil Godfrey’s Caprice, 3 vols. (1868)
- Holme Lee’s Fairy Tales (London & New York, 1868; reissued 1869)
- For Richer, for Poorer, 3 vols. (1870)
- Maurice and Eugénie de Guérin (1870) (as Harriet Parr)
- The Beautiful Miss Barrington, 3 vols. (1871)
- Country Stories, Old and New, in Prose and Verse (1872)
- Echoes of a Famous Year (1872) (as Harriet Parr)
- Katherine’s Trial (1873; Leipzig, 1873; New York, 1881)
- The Vicissitudes of Bessie Fairfax, 3 vols. (1874)
- This Work-a-Day World, 3 vols. (1875)
- Ben Milner’s Wooing (1876)
- Straightforward, 3 vols. (1878)
- Mrs. Denys of Cote, 3 vols. (1879–80)
- A Poor squire, 2 vols. (1882)
- Loving and Serving, 3 vols. (1883)
- Legends from Fairy Land: Narrating the History of Prince Glee and Princess Trill, the Cruel Persecutions & Condign Punishment of Aunt Spite, the Adventures of the Great Tuflongbo & the Story of the Blackcap in the Giant's Well, re-issued in 1907 with art nouveau illustrations by the brothers Horace and Reginald Knowles. This book was reprinted in 1988.
