= The Republic of Letters =

Mid-1920s book series published by George Routledge & Sons

The Republic of Letters was a publishing endeavor by George Routledge & Sons in the mid-1920s in London. Edited by William Rose, this series of books focused on interesting and significant poets, dramatists and novelists. In addition to containing biographical information, the books also included psychological and social background information of the writer's own time. Certain volumes include Voltaire by Richard Aldington, Pushkin by Prince D.S. Mirsky, and Gogol by Janko Lavrin.

Herbert Read and T. S. Eliot were both asked to contribute by Aldington, who himself had been approached by Routledge in 1923, but both initially refused. Eliot himself initiated a similar endeavour at Faber & Gwyer (where at the time he was a director) called "The Poets on The Poets". Eventually, after consultation with Aldington, Routledge and Eliot chose to combine their two efforts, under the joint imprint of both publishers, with Eliot and Rose as joint editors.
