= The Haunted House (story) =

1859 story series in All the Year Round

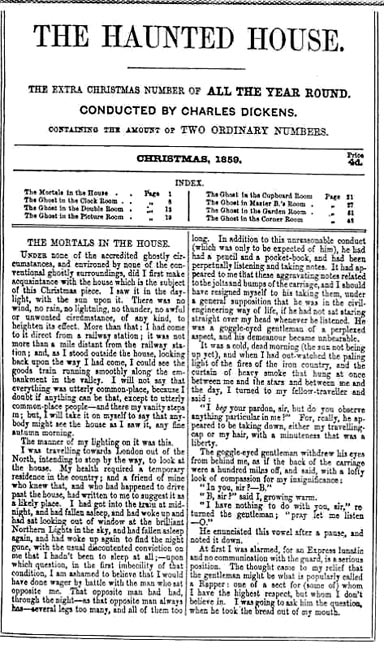
The Haunted House in All the Year Round (1859)

"The Haunted House" is a set of short stories published in 1859 for the weekly periodical All the Year Round. It was "Conducted by Charles Dickens", with Charles Dickens writing the opening and closing stories, framing stories by Dickens himself and five other authors.

In 1866, two of the stories - "The Mortals in the House" and "The Ghost in Master B's Room" - were published as a single story titled "The Haunted House" in a collection of Dickens' ghost stories also including The Trial for Murder and "The Signal-Man".

== Stories ==
- "The Mortals in the House" (Charles Dickens)
- "The Ghost in the Clock Room" (Hesba Stretton)
- "The Ghost in the Double Room" (George Augustus Sala)
- "The Ghost in the Picture Room" (Adelaide Anne Procter)
- "The Ghost in the Cupboard Room" (Wilkie Collins)
- "The Ghost in Master B's Room" (Charles Dickens)
- "The Ghost in the Garden Room" (Elizabeth Gaskell)
- "The Ghost in the Corner Room" (Charles Dickens)

== Publication history ==
The stories appeared in the Extra Christmas Number on 13 December 1859. Dickens began a tradition of Christmas publications with A Christmas Carol in 1843 and his Christmas stories soon became a national institution. The Haunted House was his 1859 offering.

In Dickens's opening story, The Mortals in the House, the narrator's ("John") health "required a temporary residence in the country." Knowing this, a friend of the narrator had chanced to drive by the house—situated close to a railroad stop mid-way between Northern England and London—and had written to the narrator suggesting he travel down from the North and look the place over. It was a large mid-eighteenth-century manor house on two square acres with a "sadly neglected garden," recently cheaply repaired, and "much too closely and heavily shadowed by trees." The house itself is "stiff ... cold ... [and] formal" and "in as bad taste, as could possibly be desired by the most loyal admirer of the whole quartet of [King] Georges." It was "ill-placed, ill-built, ill-planned, and ill-fitted." It was "damp ... not free from dry rot" and redolent with the "flavour of rats."

The house's reputation for being haunted has caused it to become "an avoided house," and although the narrator decides to rent it for six months (from October to March) and live there with his spinster sister (Patty), they cannot retain any servants due to a plethora of bizarre house noises. Therefore, by mid-November, Patty suggests that she and John "take the house wholly and solely into our own hands" and live without servants, with the exception of Bottles the stable-man who is deaf and therefore not bothered by the haunted noises. Patty further suggests that they invite a group of friends to come down and form a "Society" that would occupy the house for three months and "see what happens" as far as supernatural activity in the house is concerned.

Seven friends arrive at the end of November and draw lots for different bedrooms. Patty retains her own bedroom and John draws the bedroom of the apparently very troublesome ghost of Master B whose servant bell was always ringing until John had the bright idea of de-belling it. John and Patty's first cousin John Herschel and his wife (newlyweds) draw the "Clock Room," Alfred Starling (a young fellow of twenty-eight who "pretends to be fast") draws John's room—the "Double Room." Patty's closest friend Belinda Bates, "a most intellectual, amiable, and delightful girl" with a "fine genius for poetry, who combines "real business earnestness" with "Woman's mission, Woman's rights, Woman's wrongs" draws the "Picture-Room." Sailor Jack Governor who was once engaged to Patty "slings his hammock" in the "Corner Room," and his friend Nat Beaver (captain of a merchantman) gets the "Cupboard Room." Finally, friend and family solicitor Mr. Undery (an ace at whist) draws his lot for the "Garden Room." The friends agree to keep silent about any ghostly experiences until they gather on Twelfth Night unless "on some remarkable provocation" they have to break their silence on the subject of any haunted goings-on.

The ghosts the characters see have no connection with the house, and are not even really ghosts; the stories are of injustice, terror, or regret.

The tales are all very different, but each has an element of the strange and scary. Some of the house guests have heard stories from ghosts while others have had out-of-body experiences. Wilkie Collins tells a seafaring story of Spanish pirates and the torment of a candle that, as it burns, takes the narrator ever closer to explosion and death. Dickens himself contributes The Ghost in Master B's Room, a very peculiar tale of the ghost of innocence that hints at the author's own feelings of melancholy. Elizabeth Gaskell contributes a strong story of working people in the north of England. The closing story, The Ghost in the Corner Room, is again by Dickens.

"The Haunted House of 1859" was one of the attractions at Dickens World in Chatham, Kent, England.
