= George Routledge =

English publisher

- Born: 23 September 1812; Brampton, Cumberland, England
- Died: 13 December 1888 (aged 76); Russell Square, London, England
- Occupation: Book publisher
- Organization: George Routledge & Sons
- Spouse(s): Maria Elizabeth Warne (m. 25 Jan 1837 — 25 March 1855, her death); Mary Grace Bell (m. 11 May 1858)

George Routledge (23 September 1812 – 13 December 1888) was an English book publisher and the founder of the publishing house Routledge.

== Early life ==
He was born in Brampton, Cumberland on 23 September 1812.

== Career ==
Routledge gained his early experience of business with Thurnam & Sons, booksellers, at Carlisle. Moving to London in 1833, he started in business for himself as a bookseller in 1836, and as a publisher in 1843. He made his first serious success by reprinting the Biblical commentaries of an American writer, Albert Barnes.

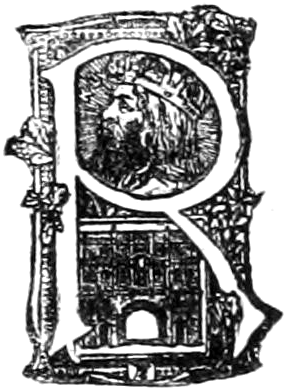
George Routledge & Sons Limited - Logo

Routledge's fame as a publisher, however, rests mainly on popular books. A series of shilling volumes, the "Railway Library", was an immense success, including as it did Harriet Beecher Stowe's Uncle Tom's Cabin, and he also published in cheap form some of the writings of Washington Irving, James Fenimore Cooper, Bulwer-Lytton and Benjamin Disraeli. He also brought out a number of shilling books in "Routledge's Universal Library" (also known as "Morley's Universal Library", the series being edited by Henry Morley).

Once styled Routledge, Warne & Routledge, his firm changed its name to that of George Routledge & Sons in 1865. A branch of the business was established in New York in 1854. An illustrated children's book, Wide Awake Stories, was published by George Routledge & Sons, Ltd.

== Personal life ==
Routledge married Maria Elizabeth Warne, who died on 25 March 1855, aged 40. He married, secondly, on 11 May 1858, Mary Grace Bell, the eldest daughter of Alderman Bell of Newcastle upon Tyne. There were children from each marriage.

His son Robert Warne Routledge became a partner on 9 November 1858, and the firm became Routledge, Warne, & Routledge.

His son Edmund Routledge became a partner in July 1865, and the firm became George Routledge & Sons.

He died on 13 December 1888, at 50 Russell Square, London.

== See also ==
- Everyman's Library
- The Republic of Letters
- Routledge (surname)
- Routledge
