= Reginald Knowles =

Reginald Lionel Knowles (1879 – 1950) was a book designer and illustrator who worked with his brother, Horace Knowles, on a number of exquisite illustrated books in the first two decades of the twentieth century, including Legends from Fairy Land (1907), Norse Fairy Tales (1910) and Old World Love-Stories (1913).

While both brothers usually share equal credit, it is understood that most of the colour illustrations and detailed monotone images were prepared by Reginald Knowles who signed "RLK" (e.g., Everyman's Library).

The work of the Knowles' brothers drew influences from Art Nouveau, Victorian Fantasy and Gothic Revival imagery.

A decade after their earliest work, Horace Knowles produced a stunning and comprehensive suite of colour and monotone illustrations for Peeps into Fairyland (1924).

In later life Reginald illustrated the angling books of Wilfred Gavin Brown: My River and Some Other Waters (1947); Angler's Almanac: Some Leaves On A River (1949).

He also illustrated the inside cover and title page of the 1933 memorial edition of The Book of Simple Delights by Walter Raymond.

== Biography ==
Reginald Knowles was born at Poplar in east London in 1879, to parents Ebenezer Caleb Knowles and Emma Dece Scutt and, amongst other siblings, had two artistic brothers, Charles and Horace. He attended George Green's School in Poplar and evening classes at the Craft School in Aldgate and, on leaving school, became and artist for the publishers J. M. Dent.

== Career ==
Reginald Knowles is best known for his decorations for J. M. Dent's Everyman series of pocket sized books from 1906-1935. The first 50 volumes show Knowles's work; they have intricately decorative pale green/grey endpapers, showing the draped figure of Good Deeds, the sister of Knowledge, facing a scroll of the latter's address to Everyman - "Everyman, I will go with thee and be thy guide, In they most need to go by thy side" - and the whole title page is filled with art nouveau style swirling floral decorations. There a further intricate (this time gilt stamped) decorations to the cloth spines of the books.This style of his work is likely to have been heavily influenced by artists like William Morris and Laurence Housman.

Reginald further designed bindings for a number of other publishers, including Jarrolds, Cassell, George Newnes and George Allen and they are quite recognisable by their highly decorated gold-blocked upper (or front) boards.

== Works Illustrated ==
- Lee, H.: Legends From Fairy Land (Freemantle, 1907)
- Norse Fairy Tales (Freemantle, 1910)
- Old World Love-Stories (Dent, 1913)
- Sutton, E.: The Happy Isles (Dent, 1938)
- The Round of the World (Muller, 1945)
- My River and Some Other Waters (Muller, 1947)
- Angler's Almanac: Some Leaves On A River (Muller, 1949)
