= Everyman's Library =

Reprint series of Random House

- Parent company: Random House
- Founded: 1906; 120 years ago
- Founder: J. M. Dent
- Successor: Alfred A. Knopf; Weidenfeld & Nicolson
- Country of origin: United Kingdom
- Headquarters location: New York City, United States
- Distribution: Penguin Random House
- Publication types: Books
- Official website: www.everymanslibrary.co.uk

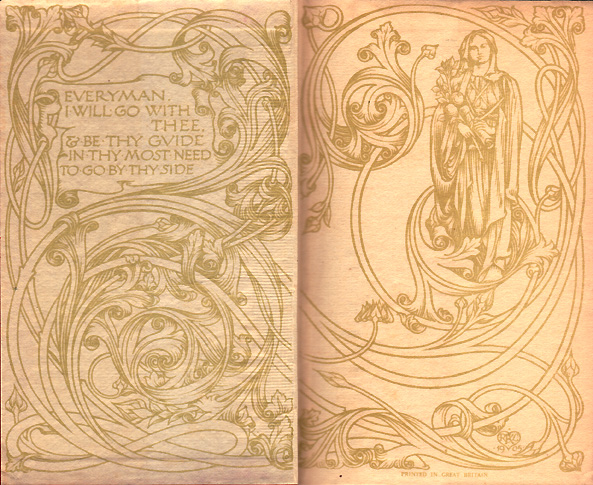
Endpapers of the original 1906 run of the Everyman's Library. The art signed "RLK" is heavily based on that of William Morris and his Kelmscott Press, whereas the quotation is derived from the medieval play Everyman

Lays of Marie de France and Others, translated by Eugene Mason, 1911

(Click on thumbnail to view the image in its original size) Different incarnations of Everyman's Library throughout its history. Left to right: the original J. M. Dent hardback with its distinctive yellow dust jacket, an early example of an Everyman Paperback also published by Dent from the 1960s, the present design of Everyman paperbacks published by Dent since the 1990s, an example of the initial 'plain' hardback Everyman volume published by David Campbell, an updated version of Campbell's Everyman hardbacks with a striated front cover and orange spine with black band

Everyman's Library is a series of reprints of classic literature, primarily from the Western canon. It began in 1906. It is currently published in hardback by Random House. It was originally an imprint of J. M. Dent (itself later a division of Weidenfeld & Nicolson and presently an imprint of Orion Books), which continues to publish Everyman Paperbacks.

== History ==
Everyman's Library was conceived in 1905 by London publisher Joseph Malaby Dent, whose goal was to create a 1,000-volume library of world literature that was affordable for, and that appealed to, every kind of person, from students to the working classes to the cultural elite. Dent followed the design principles and to a certain extent the style established by William Morris in his Kelmscott Press. For this, Dent asked the Monotype corporation to design a new typeface: Veronese was a remake of a foundry-face Dent had used before. Series 59 came out in 1912, and was made in the same style of the Golden Type, but with sharper slab serifs and cleaner lines. Now Dent was able to produce his texts with machines.

The series' original title pages, gift spines and endpapers were designed by Reginald Knowles. This old style was later replaced in 1935 by Eric Ravilious's designs. Everyman's Library books were pocket-sized hardcovers that sold initially for what was then the remarkably low price of a shilling apiece. The original U.S. distribution rights were granted to New York City publishers E. P. Dutton.

The name of the publication series was suggested by poet and editor Ernest Rhys, who was named head editor of the series initially, and asked to find a suitable name to encompass Dent's goal. Rhys tried and discarded many ideas before recalling a quotation from the medieval play Everyman in which the character of Knowledge says to Everyman:

Everyman,
I will go with thee,
and be thy guide,
In thy most need
to go by thy side.

This quotation appears on the title page of all volumes of Everyman's Library and Everyman Paperbacks.

J. M. Dent and Company commenced the series in 1906 with an edition of James Boswell's Life of Johnson, published with a quotation on the title page from the works of John Milton: "A good book is the precious life-blood of a master-spirit, embalmed and treasured upon purpose to a life beyond life." In 1910, 500 books had been published under the Everyman trademark, and in 1956, fulfilling Dent's original goal—the thousandth volume, Aristotle's Metaphysics, having been selected for the honour, was published.

By 1975, Dent's vision had been well surpassed, as Everyman's Library consisted of 994 titles published in 1,239 volumes. Volumes were collected under the following genres: Fiction, Theology & Philosophy, History, Classical, For Young People, Essays, Oratory, Poetry & Drama, Biography, Reference, and Romance. The appropriate genre was printed inside and used to organise the periodically released lists of the series.

After ceasing publication of new titles in the 1970s, the hardback rights to Everyman's Library were sold to the newly formed David Campbell Publishers in 1991 and relaunched with the support of the Random House Group in the United Kingdom and through Alfred A. Knopf (which had been acquired by Random House in 1960) in the United States, a move praised by many notable authors. Control of Everyman's Library passed to US-based Random House in 2002, who continue to publish it under the Knopf Publishers imprint there and (albeit without changes) as Random House UK elsewhere.

J. M. Dent & Sons was acquired by Weidenfeld & Nicolson in 1988, itself acquired by the Orion Publishing Group in 1991, now both part of Hachette Livre (UK). Orion continues to publish the unrelated Everyman Paperbacks under the J. M. Dent imprint in the UK and via Charles E. Tuttle Co. in the US.

The current membership of the Honorary Editorial Committee includes Henry Louis Gates Jr., Cynthia Ozick and Simon Schama. Former committee members include Harold Bloom and Toni Morrison.

== Everyman's Encyclopaedia ==
A notable addition to the library was a multi-volume encyclopedia, which was added to the range in 1913. Individual volumes could be purchased separately, enabling the set to be budgeted over time. The fifth edition was published in 1967, by which time it consisted of 12 volumes, containing 7763 pages.

The page size was 9 by 5 inches (23 by 13 cm), but as the printing was 8 point, a large amount of information was contained in each volume. As a volume only weighed about 1.25 kg (2.8 lb), it was considered a better size for use by children.

== See also ==
- Library of America
- Modern Library
- Oxford World's Classics
- Penguin Classics
- George Routledge
- Routledge
- Albatross Books
- Tauchnitz publishers
- The Harvard Classics
- Bibliothèque de la Pléiade
