= The Trial for Murder =

Short story by Charles Dickens

- Short story by Charles Dickens
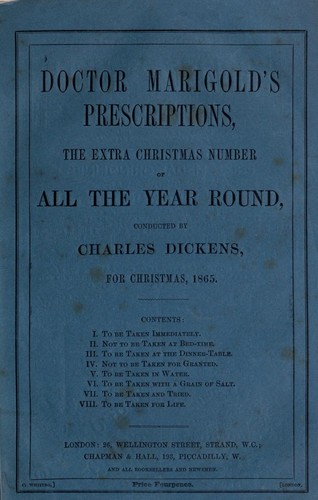

Text available at Wikisource
- Original title: To Be Taken with a Grain of Salt
- Country: United Kingdom
- Language: English
- Genre: Ghost story

Publication
- Published in: All the Year Round
- Publisher: Chapman & Hall
- Publication date: December 1865

"The Trial for Murder" is a short story by Charles Dickens. It was originally published under the title "To Be Taken with a Grain of Salt" as a chapter in Dr. Marigold's Prescriptions, a December 1865 extra Christmas volume of the weekly literary magazine, All the Year Round. It was later published in 1866 in a collection of ghost stories known as "Three Ghost Stories", along with "The Haunted House" and "The Signal-Man".

== Synopsis ==
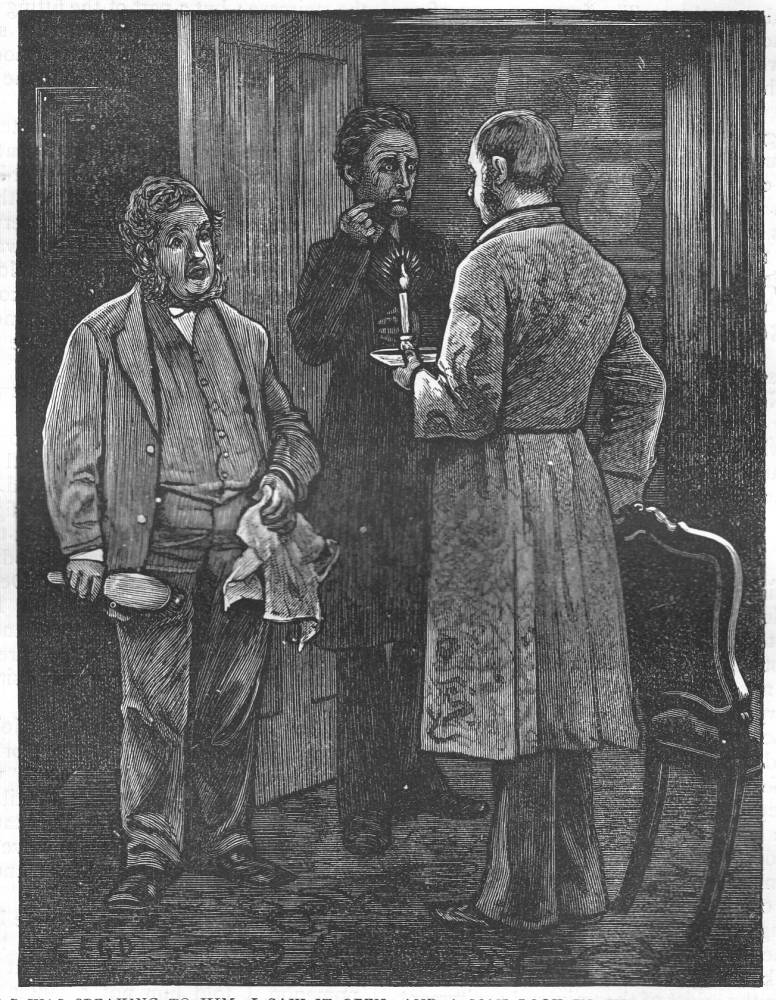
"While I was speaking to him, I saw it open, and a man look in, who very earnestly and mysteriously beckoned to me." Illustration by Edward Dalziel

"The Trial for Murder" is a supernatural horror story in which the ghost of a murder victim appears repeatedly to the foreman of the jury, and harasses the jurors and witnesses throughout the court case to ensure that the suspected murderer is convicted.

== Potential inspiration ==
After reading Elizabeth Gaskell's "The Old Nurse’s Story", Dickens was critical of its ending where everyone in the story could see the ghost. He felt that it was too similar to other famous works, such as William Shakespeare's representations of ghosts, and would be uninteresting to readers.

As Dickens wrote to Gaskell: "I have no doubt, according to every principle of art that is known to me from Shak-speare [sic] downwards, that you weaken the terror of the story by making them all see the phantoms at the end. And I feel a perfect conviction that the best readers will be the most certain to make this discovery. Nous verrons."

This later inspired the main concept within "The Trial for Murder", whereby terror was to be achieved through ambiguity and obscurity.

== Themes ==
=== Ambiguity ===
From the beginning of the story, Dickens creates a level of ambiguity that is sustained throughout the entire story. This can be seen from the title itself which suggests to the reader to maintain a degree of skepticism and doubt as one reads the story.

In addition, the narrator begins with a justification of his credibility and sanity, reflecting upon the fact that it is much easier to share realistic experiences than supernatural ones. However, the retrospective nature of the narration, and his insistence on his credibility, may suggest the unreliability of the commentary. This is further compounded by the singular narrative perspective and narrative cues, whereby the narrator was the only person able to see the ghost.

The ambiguity of the story has opened up interpretations of the story revolving around three main concepts: either the narrator is lying, telling the truth, or of an unsound mind.

=== Dickens's criticism of the Victorian justice system ===
The murderer could only be rightfully charged when the ghost of the murder victim influences the trial, presenting an argument that the justice system can only be just under supernatural circumstances.

However, the portrayal of the narrator's ability to see past the idiocy of the jurors and the corruption of the witnesses to continue fighting for the right sentence may also convey that each individual has the power to rise up against the corruption rife in the Victorian justice system.

== Questionable authorship ==
Although it is typically credited only to Dickens, it is occasionally thought to be a collaborative work between Dickens and Charles Allston Collins.

This has been credited to the atypical use of ghosts in the story. Dickens's ghosts "are always about something other than just being ghosts in any conventionally, Gothically, understood way" due to the fact that Dickens's ghost stories usually take the form of an allegory. Moreover, the characters in the story do not reference Dickens's childhood or past life, as his other ghost stories usually do.

Another key difference between the portrayal of the ghost in the Trial for Murder and Dickens's typical ghosts, is its ambiguity. While most of Dickens's ghosts are described in detail, the singular description of the justice-seeking spectre was that “his face was the colour of impure wax”.

As such, scholars have speculated that the story is in fact a collaboration between Collins and Dickens due to it being more similar to conventional ghost stories written in that time period. Notable scholars who have made such claims include Deborah Thomas in Dickens and the Short story, as well as Harold Orel, a senior Dickens scholar, who suggested that The Trial for Murder was written by Charles Allston Collins, and was only reworked by Charles Dickens in his book, The Victorian Short Story.

== Legacy ==
This story served as a great influence to M. R. James, who was a big fan of Dickens's stories. Some of his stories, like "Count Magnus", "The Story of a Disappearance and an Appearance", "Casting the Runes", and "A Warning to the Curious" include subtle allusions to the story, while "Martin's Close" is a clear homage to Dickens's story. Another writer inspired by the story is Sheridan Le Fanu, who referenced the story multiple times in his story "Mr Justice Harbottle". It has been also adapted to TV as one of the episodes of Orson Welles Great Mysteries.
