= Nora Mitrani =

Bulgarian writer

Nora Mitrani (1921–1961) was a Bulgarian writer, one of the most active surrealists in France in the 1950s.

== Life ==
Nora Mitrani was born on 29 November 1921, in Sofia. Her parents were Spanish-Jewish and Italian. Michel Mitrani was her younger brother.

As a teenager, Mitrani moved to Paris. She studied philosophy at the Sorbonne, completing a PhD on Malebranche and Maine de Biran. For many years she worked under Georges Gurvitch, as a sociologist and researcher at the CNRS.

During the war she was a Trotskyist. She joined the surrealist movement in 1947 and remained an outspoken member of the movement throughout her life. In the early 1930s surrealists objected to Stalinism, Mitrani expressing her opposition in these terms: “The collective massacres of these last few years have proven only too well that the crime of passion had ceased to be a solitary and magnificent mystery, but instead organized itself, crumbled into office files, into racial laws, faded into concepts of the Good and the Honorable”.

Her written works covered a wide array of topics such as the Marquis de Sade, popular culture, Kierkegaard, film noir, and critical studies of technocracy, bureaucracy, and nuclear energy. Most of her surrealist works were collected and published in 1988 under the title Rose au Coeur Violet.

In 1947–1948, she lived with Hans Bellmer in Toulouse. In 1949, he tried to break from the relationship by moving to Paris.

== Death ==
She died on 22 March 1961 in Paris.

== Works ==
- "Attitudes et symboles techno-bureaucratiques", Cahiers internationaux de sociologie, XXIV, 148
- Rose au cœur violet, 1988.
- ' Intention and surprise', in Paul Hammond, ed.,The shadow and its shadow: surrealist writings on the cinema, 3rd.ed, 2000. ISBN 9780872863767
