= Samuel Sidney =

- Born: February 6, 1813; Birmingham, England
- Died: June 8, 1883 (aged 70); Stamford Hill
- Occupations: Author, lawyer

Samuel Sidney was the pseudonym of Samuel Solomon (6 February 1813 – 8 June 1883), an English writer who treated the widely varied fields of agriculture and animal husbandry, railways, and emigration to Australia.

== Life ==
Sidney was the son of Abraham Solomon, M.D. of Birmingham. He had a brother, John, born 1821. Although he studied law and practiced for a short while in Liverpool, he soon turned to writing.

Australia

Sidney never visited Australia himself. His output on the subject of Australia was probably occasioned by his brother John's experiences there from around 1838 to 1843. The brothers' Australian Hand-Book sold around 7,000 copies. Sidney's 1852 book The Three Colonies of Australia sold 5,000 copies in its first year, and also had German and American editions. These were very good sales for the time. In addition to books, Sidney edited and published Sidney's Emigrants Journal and later the monthly Sidney's Emigrant's Journal and Traveller's Magazine. Sidney's Three Colonies of Australia is praised for impressive documentation and for "finely pointed and graceful" writing.

Domestic matters

On domestic matters Sidney first wrote about the question of railroad gauges and their consequences to agriculture and the economy. He wrote a series in the Live Stock Journal titled "Horse Chat", which foretold of his growing expertise in the area, culminating in his 1873 Book of the Horse. His edit and rewriting of The Pig, a classic in animal husbandry by William Charles Linnaeus Martin, was praised.

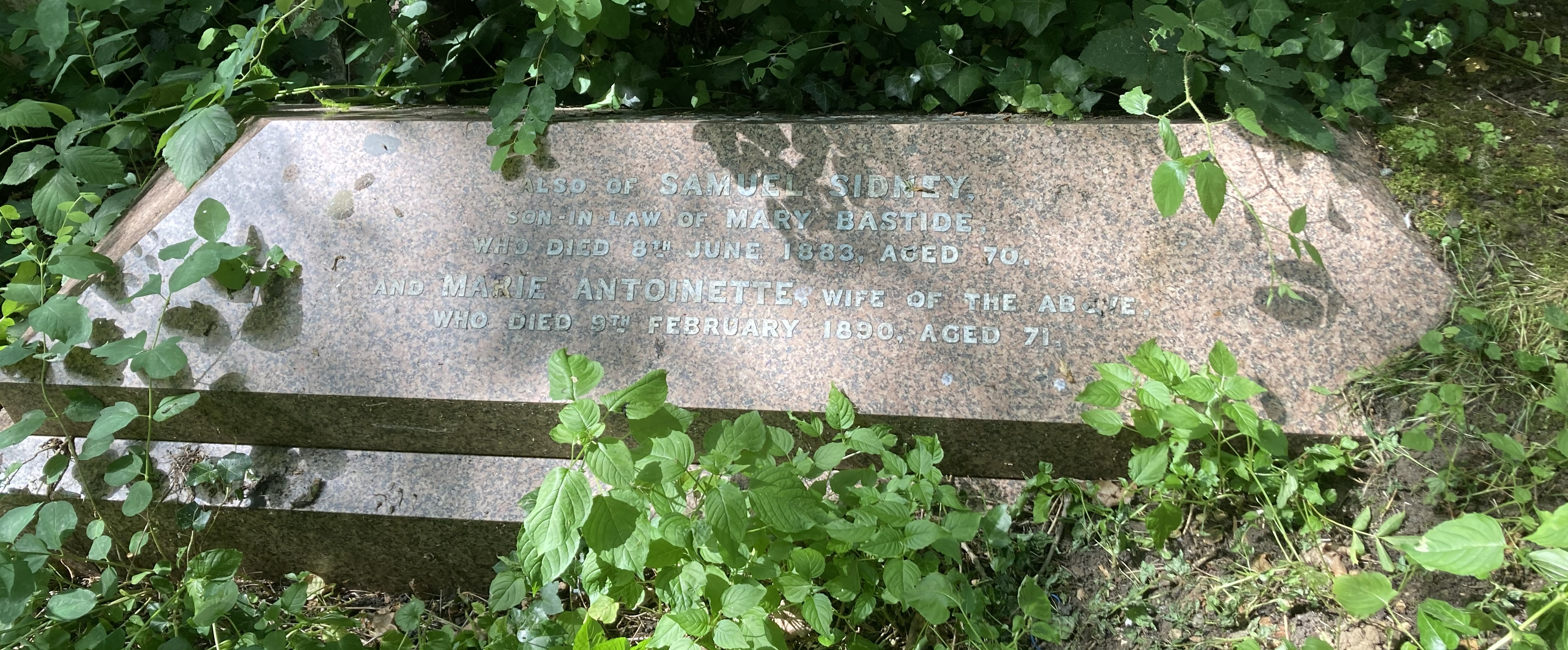
Grave of Samuel Sidney in Highgate Cemetery

Other positions

Aside from authorship, Sidney was Assistant commissioner of the Great Exhibition, and Assistant Secretary of the Crystal Palace Company.

He died in 1883 and was buried on the west side of Highgate Cemetery.

== Works ==
- Gauge Evidence (1846)
- The Double Gauge Railway System (1847)
- A Voice from the Far Interior of Australia (1847) (co-authored with his brother, originally under the pseudonym "A Bushman")
- Sidney's Australian Hand-Book (1848) (co-authored with his brother)
- The Commercial Consequences of a Mixed Gauge (1848)
- Railways and Agriculture in North Lincolnshire (1848)
- Rides on Railways (1851)
- The Three Colonies of Australia (1852)
- Gallops and Gossips in the Bush of Australia (1854) (novel)
- The Book of the Horse (1873)
