= The Mudfog Papers =

Anthology of stories by Charles Dickens

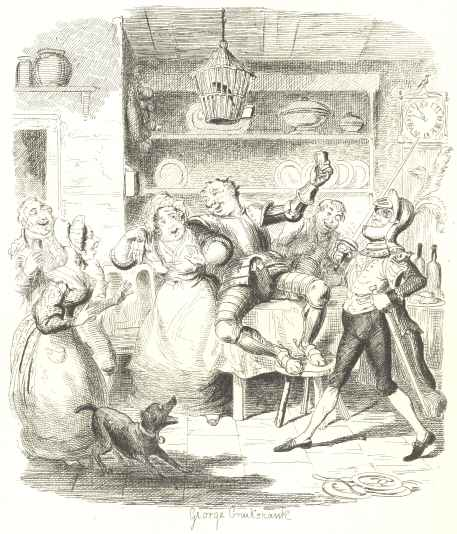
An illustration from The Mudfog Papers by George Cruikshank

The Mudfog Papers are an anthology of stories written by Charles Dickens and published from 1837 to 1838 in the monthly literary journal Bentley's Miscellany, which he was then editing.

== Topics ==
The Mudfog Papers relates the proceedings of a fictional society, The Mudfog Society for the Advancement of Everything, a Pickwickian parody of the British Association for the Advancement of Science. The latter, founded in York in 1831, was one of numerous Victorian learned societies dedicated to the advancement of science. Like The Pickwick Papers, The Mudfog Papers claims affinity with parliamentary reports, memoirs and posthumous papers. The serial was illustrated by George Cruikshank.

The fictional town of Mudfog was based on Chatham in Kent, where Dickens spent part of his youth. When Oliver Twist first appeared in Bentley's Miscellany in February 1837, Mudfog was described by Dickens as the town where Oliver was born and spent his early years, making Oliver Twist related to The Mudfog Papers, but this allusion was removed when the novel was published as a book.

At the conclusion of his first contribution, about the mayor of the provincial town of Mudfog, Dickens explains that "this is the first time we have published any of our gleanings from this particular source", referring to The Mudfog Papers. He also suggests that "at some future period, we may venture to open the chronicles of Mudfog".

The Papers was first published as a book under the title The Mudfog Papers and Other Sketches in 1880.

== Contents ==
- I. Public Life of Mr Tulrumble – Once Mayor of Mudfog
- II. Full Report of The First Meeting of The Mudfog Association for The Advancement of Everything
- III. Full Report of The Second Meeting of The Mudfog Association for The Advancement of Everything
- IV. The Pantomime of Life
- V. Some Particulars Concerning a Lion
- VI. Mr Robert Bolton: The "Gentleman Connected with the Press"
- VII. Familiar Epistle from a Parent to a Child Aged Two Years and Two Months
