= To Be Read at Dusk =

1852 short story by Charles Dickens

- Short story by Charles Dickens
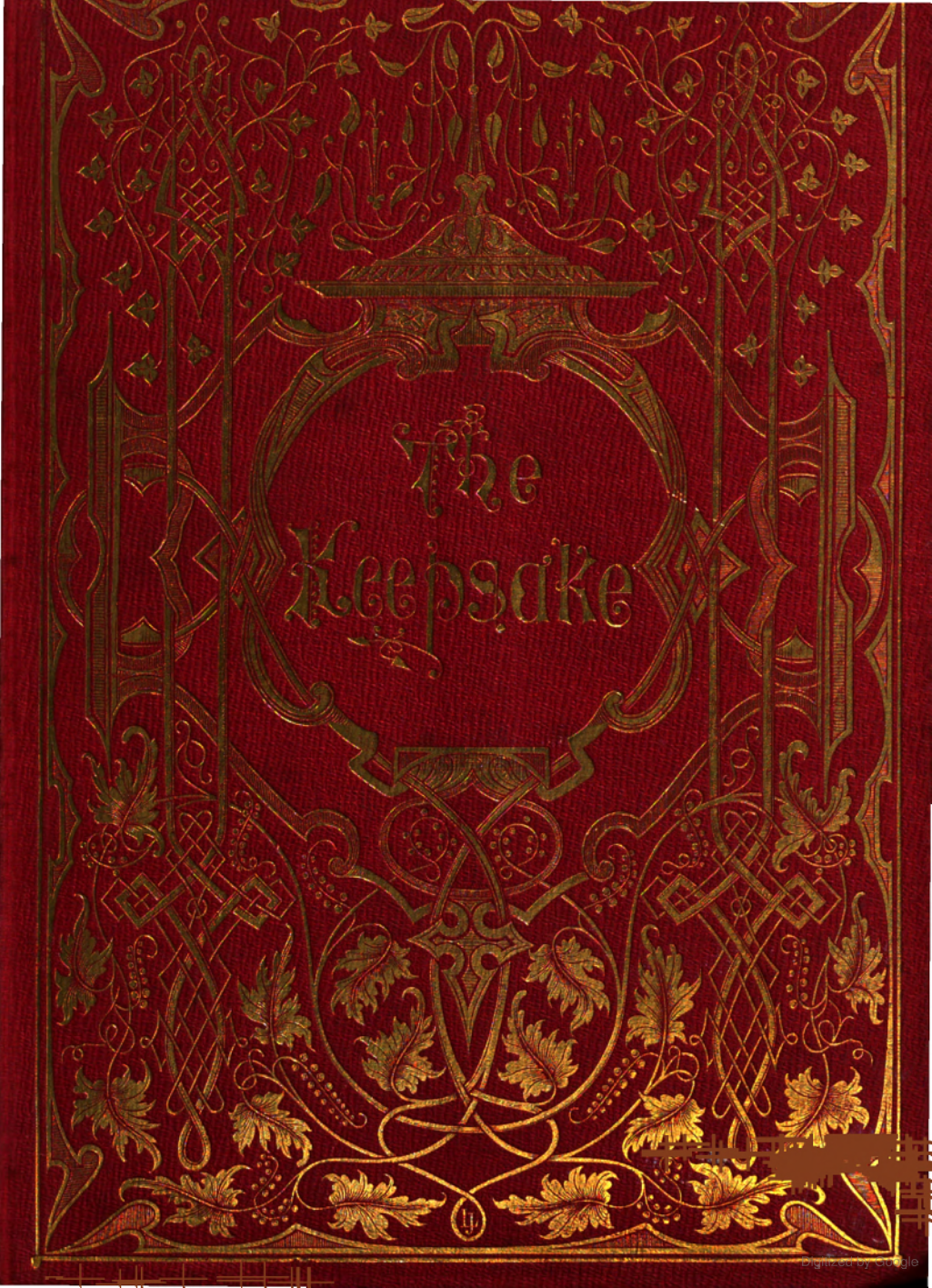
- "To Be Read at Dusk" was first published in the 1852 edition of The Keepsake.

Text available at Wikisource
- Country: United Kingdom
- Language: English

Publication
- Published in: The Keepsake
- Publication date: 1852

"To Be Read at Dusk" is an 1852 short story written by Charles Dickens, first published in The Keepsake.

== Plot summary ==
Five couriers talking amongst themselves outside a convent on the summit of the Great St Bernard Pass are overheard by the narrator, as two of their group's members relate short ghost stories. The first story is of a young woman who disappears, apparently taken from her newly-wed husband by a mysterious man who had previously appeared in her nightmares; the second is of a man who sees an apparition of his brother, and is thereby warned of the latter's death.
