= Horace J Knowles =

English author and illustrator (1884–1954)

Horace J. Knowles
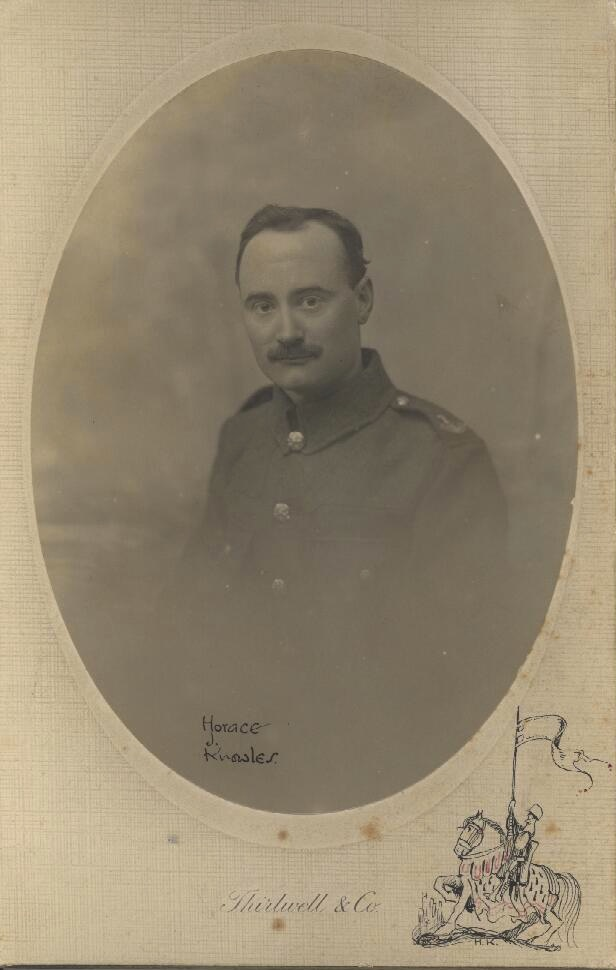
- Born: 22 July 1884
- Died: 21 August 1954 (aged 70)
- Known for: Children's Literature, Fairy Stories and Bible Illustrations
- Notable work: Peeps Into Fairyland, The Bible, The Legend Of Glastonbury, The Sermon On The Mount, Countryside Treasures

Horace John Knowles (22 July 1884 – 21 August 1954) was an author and illustrator. He is remembered mostly for magical depictions of Fairyland in his magnum opus Peeps into Fairyland, as well as for his biblical illustrations. For his first two published books, Legends from Fairyland (1908) and Norse Fairy Tales (1910), he collaborated with his brother Reginald L. Knowles.

Knowles' style, similar to that of his brother, has often been described as Art Nouveau.

== Partial list of works ==
A set of biblical illustrations and maps created for the British and Foreign Bible Society's 1954 edition of the Revised Standard Version, later used in the popular New English Bible, the King James Authorised Version 400th Anniversary Edition Bible, and other bibles.

- Legends From Fairyland (1908)
- Norse Fairy Tales (1910)
- Cowslips And Kingcups (1920)
- Among The Innocents (1920)
- Hans Andersen's Fairy Tales (1923, unpublished)
- The Land Of Goodness Knows Where (1923)
- Peeps into Fairyland (1924)
- The Enid Blyton Book Of Fairies (1924)
- Eager Heart (1931)
- A Book Of Thoughts On Courage (1932)
- A Book Of Thoughts On Friendship (1932)
- A Book Of Thoughts On Hope (1932)
- For A Little Child Like Me (1934)
- The Sermon On The Mount (1935)
- The Months (1936)
- The Friendly Year (1940)
- The Land of Far Beyond (1942)
- Mrs Nimble And Mr Bumble (1944)
- Three Asiatic Legends In Rhyme (1945)
- Countryside Treasures (1946)
- Through The Hole In The Wall (1946)
- The Legend of Glastonbury (1948)
- Sea-Eagle (1952)
