= Women's writing (literary category) =

Academic discipline

The academic discipline of women's writing is a discrete area of literary studies which is based on the notion that the experience of women, historically, has been shaped by their sex, and so women writers by definition are a group worthy of separate study: "Their texts emerge from and intervene in conditions usually very different from those which produced most writing by men." It is not a question of the subject matter or political stance of a particular author, but of her sex, i.e. her position as a woman within the literary world.

Women's writing, as a discrete area of literary studies and practice, is recognized explicitly by the number of dedicated journals, organizations, awards, and conferences that focus mainly or exclusively on texts produced by women. Women's writing as a recognized area of study has been developing since the 1970s. The majority of English and American literature programs offer courses on specific aspects of literature by women, and women's writing is generally considered an area of specialization in its own right.

== Distinct category ==
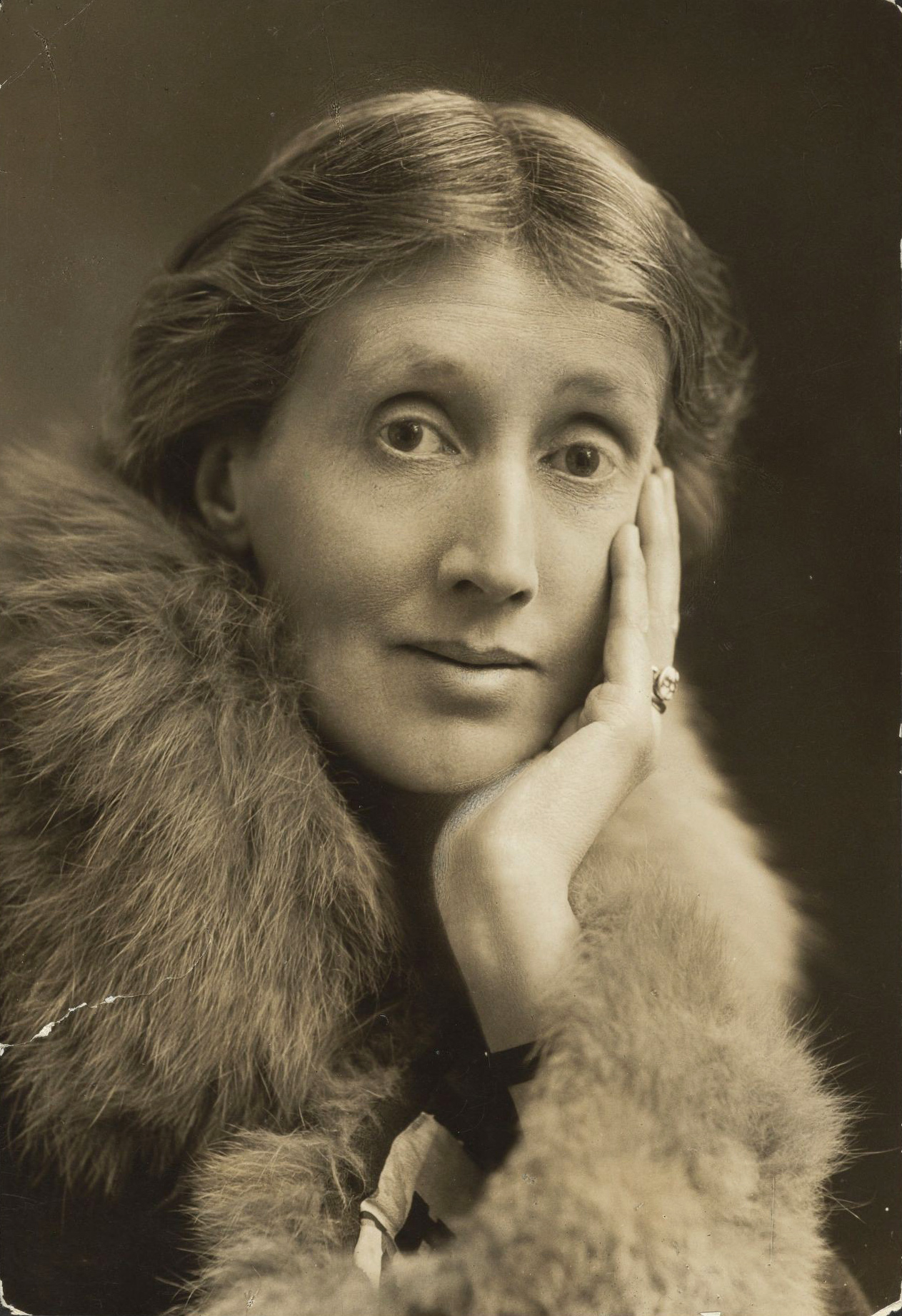
Virginia Woolf

The broader discussion of women's cultural contributions as a separate category has a long history, but the specific study of women's writing as a distinct category of scholarly interest is relatively recent. There are examples in the 18th century of catalogues of women writers, including George Ballard's Memoirs of Several Ladies of Great Britain Who Have Been Celebrated for their Writing or Skill in the Learned Languages, Arts, and Sciences (1752); John Duncombe's Feminiad, a catalogue of women writers; and the Biographium faemineum: the female worthies, or, Memoirs of the most illustrious ladies, of all ages and nations, who have been eminently distinguished for their magnanimity, learning, genius, virtue, piety, and other excellent endowments. Similarly, women have been treated as a distinct category by various misogynist writings, perhaps best exemplified by Richard Polwhele's The Unsex'd Females, a critique in verse of women writers at the end of the 18th century with a particular focus on Mary Wollstonecraft and her circle.

Earlier discussion of women's broader cultural contributions can be found as far back as the 8th century BC, when Hesiod compiled Catalogue of Women (attr.), a list of heroines and goddesses. Plutarch listed heroic and artistic women in his Moralia. In the medieval period, Boccaccio used mythic and biblical women as moral exemplars in De mulieribus claris (On Famous Women) (1361–1375), directly inspiring Christine de Pisan to write The Book of the City of Ladies (1405).

Women writers themselves have long been interested in tracing a "woman's tradition" in writing. Mary Scott's The Female Advocate: A Poem Occasioned by Reading Mr Duncombe's Feminead (1774) is one of the best known such works in the 18th century, a period that saw a burgeoning of women writers being published. In 1803, Mary Hays published the six-volume Female Biography. Virginia Woolf's 1929 A Room of One's Own exemplifies the impulse in the modern period to explore a tradition of women's writing. Woolf, however, sought to explain what she perceived as an absence; and by the mid-century scholarly attention turned to finding and reclaiming "lost" writers. There were many to reclaim: it is common for the editors of dictionaries or anthologies of women's writing to refer to the difficulty in choosing from all the available material.

Trade publishers have similarly focused on women's writing: since the 1970s there have been a number of literary periodicals (such as Fireweed and Room of One's Own) which are dedicated for publishing the creative work of women writers, and there are a number of dedicated presses as well, such as the Second Story Press and the Women's Press. In addition, collections and anthologies of women's writing continue to be published by both trade and academic presses.

The question of whether there a "women's tradition" remains vexing; some scholars and editors refer to a "women's canon" and women's "literary lineage", and seek to "identify the recurring themes and to trace the evolutionary and interconnecting patterns" in women's writing, but the range of women's writing across time and place is so considerable that, according to some, it is inaccurate to speak of "women's writing" in a universal sense: Claire Buck calls "women's writing" an "unstable category." Further, women writers cannot be considered apart from their male contemporaries and the larger literary tradition, although society has often condemned them to a certain marginality. Recent scholarship on race, class, and sexuality in literature further complicate the issue and militate against the impulse to posit one "women's tradition". Some scholars, such as Roger Lonsdale, mentions that something of a commonality exists and that "it is not unreasonable to consider "women writers" in some aspects as a special case, given their educational insecurities and the constricted notions of the properly 'feminine' in social and literary behavior they faced." Using the term "women's writing" implies, then, the belief that women in some sense constitute a group, however diverse, who share a position of difference based on gender. The normative events within a woman’s life do not always coincide with that of a man’s; part of this difference includes the fact that women can bear children. Motherhood has been a popular subject among women writers, especially following the second wave of the feminism movement in which women originally seen as “homemakers” began to enter the workforce and abandon their domestic traditions.

== Rediscovering ignored works from the past ==
In the West, the second wave of feminism prompted a general revelation of women's historical contributions, and various academic sub-disciplines, such as women's history and women's writing, developed in response to the belief that women's lives and contributions have been underrepresented as areas of scholarly interest. Much of this early period of feminist literary scholarship was given over to the rediscovery and reclamation of texts written by women. Studies such as Dale Spender's Mothers of the Novel (1986) and Jane Spencer's The Rise of the Woman Novelist (1986) were ground-breaking in their insistence that women have always been writing. Commensurate with this growth in scholarly interest, various presses began the task of reissuing long-out-of-print texts. Virago Press began to publish its large list of 19th and early-20th-century novels in 1975, and became one of the first commercial presses to join in the project of reclamation. In the 1980s Pandora Press, responsible for publishing Spender's study, issued a companion line of 18th-century novels by written by women. More recently, Broadview Press continues to issue 18th- and 19th-century novels, many hitherto out of print, and the University of Kentucky has a series of republications of early women's novels. There has been commensurate growth in the area of biographical dictionaries of women writers due to a perception, according to one editor, that "[m]ost of our women are not represented in the 'standard' reference books in the field."

Elaine V. Bellin's book, Redeeming Eve: Women Writers of the English Renaissance, mentions the lack of female representation in renaissance literature, and explores the idea of missing evidence of female writers of that period. The widespread interest in women's writing developed alongside, and was influenced by, a general reassessment and expansion of the literary canon. Interest in post-colonial literature, gay and lesbian literature, writing by people of colour, working people's writing, and the cultural productions of other historically marginalized groups has resulted in a whole-scale expansion of what is considered "literature", and genres hitherto not regarded as "literary" (such as children's writing, journals, letters, and travel writing, among many others) are now the subjects of scholarly interest. Most genres and sub-genres have undergone a similar analysis, so that one now sees work on the "female gothic" or women's science fiction, for example.

== Common themes ==
- Ambition
- Autonomy
- Identity
- Motherhood
- Relationships
- Sexism
- Violence

Literature is a vast and expansive category of written works. The topics chosen as subjects of books, poems, and essays are characterized by the first-hand experiences people have from their lives. While the women’s writing literary category covers a multitude of subjects and situations, there are clear common themes within works that reflect the ideals of more than one woman.

The topic of motherhood, especially pregnancy, is a highly controversial topic within the literary world. Due to the perpetual war being waged in the fight between pro-choice and pro-life lawmaking, the tone in which women writers speak of pregnancy has sparked debate amongst the feminist movement. While some believe that motherhood is a choice and reflects the ideologies of the pro-choice movement, in which people have the freedom to choose whether or not they will be a parent, others view motherhood as an “inevitable destiny” that acts as an “imposition from the repressive alliance between biology and patriarchy.”

But the topic itself is analyzed further within many works written by female authors. Writers like Sylvia Plath, Elizabeth Acevedo, Diane di Prima, Mina Loy, Elana K. Arnold, Robin Benway, Virginia Woolf, Janet Finch, Mary H. K. Choi, Jessamine Chan, and more have examined the subject of motherhood from a variety of perspectives, in a multitude of mediums. Many authors detail their experiences as both mothers and writers and the balance that comes with creating new art while caring for their most challenging creation yet.

While women's experiences allow them to write of these topics with more empathy for those in similar circumstances, men have been and still write for the purpose of speaking for women. Walt Whitman, one of the most famed authors of the 19th century, utilized his poem "Song of Myself" to speak for the "maternal as well as paternal" within his work. While his poem was highly revered by critics and cemented his status as a highly acclaimed poet, Whitman's equipment of maternal themes and imagery draws attention away from the women who have firsthand birthed the famed poets and authors of the world. The categorization of women authors as a separate literary category addresses how inconsistent and inaccurate some men's interpretations of living as a woman can be.

== "Exemplary women" tradition ==
- Hesiod, Catalogue of Women (attr.)
- Plutarch, in Moralia
- Boccaccio, De mulieribus claris (On Famous Women) (1361–1375)
- Christine de Pisan, The Book of the City of Ladies (1405)
- Osbern Bokenam, Legendys of hooly wummen (c.1430)
- George Ballard, Memoirs of Several Ladies of Great Britain Who Have Been Celebrated for their Writing or Skill in the Learned Languages, Arts, and Sciences. Oxford: W. Jackson, 1752.
- John Duncombe, The Feminead (1754)
- Anon., Biographium faemineum : the female worthies, or, Memoirs of the most illustrious ladies, of all ages and nations, who have been eminently distinguished for their magnanimity, learning, genius, virtue, piety, and other excellent endowments. London: Printed for S. Crowder, 1766. 2 vols.
- Mary Scott, The Female Advocate: A Poem Occasioned by Reading Mr Duncombe's Feminead. London: Joseph Johnson, 1774.
- Mary Hays, Female Biography, or Memoirs of Illustrious and Celebrated Women of All Ages and Countries (6 vols, 1803)
- Sarah Josepha Hale, Woman's Record; or, Sketches of All Distinguished women from the Creation to AD 1850 (1854)
- Charlotte Mary Yonge, Biographies of Good Women (First Series, 1862; Second Series, 1865)
- Julia Kavanagh, Women in France during the Eighteenth Century (1850), Women of Christianity (1852), French Women of Letters (1862) and English Women of Letters (1862). These collective biographies "all argue against idealized, sentimental portrayals of female experience. She intended these biographies to provide a corrective to the silence of male historians on the topic of female influence in a variety of sphere beyond the domestic" (ODNB).
- Helen C. Black, Notable Women Authors of the Day: Biographical Sketches (1893).
  - "These sketches originally appeared as a series in the 'Lady's pictorial'... They are now revised, enlarged and brought up to date." Sketches of Eliza Lynn Linton, Charlotte Riddell, Lucy Bethia Walford, Rhoda Broughton, John Strange Winter (pseud. of Henrietta Eliza Vaughan Stannard), Mrs. Alexander (pseud. of Annie French Hector), Helen Mathers (pseud of Ellen Buckingham Mathews), Florence Marryat, Caroline Emily Sharp, Margaret Wolfe Hungerford, Matilda Betham-Edwards, Edna Lyall (pseud of Ada Ellen Bayly), Rosa Nouchette Carey, Adeline Sergeant, Mary Eliza Kennard, Jessie Fothergill, Mary Anne Hardy, Iza Duffus Hardy, May Crommelin, Matilda Charlotte Houstoun, Caroline Rosetta Fraser, Julie Bosville Chetwynd, Jean Middlemass, Augusta De Grasse Stevens, Bertha Jane Grundy (wrote as Mrs. Leith Adams), Jean Ingelow.

== Resources ==
- Abel, Elizabeth, Writing and Sexual Difference. University of Chicago Press, 1982.
- Allison, Dorothy. Skin: Talking About Sex, Class & Literature. New York: Firebrand Books, 1994.
- Ayres, Brenda, Silent Voices: Forgotten Novels by Victorian Women Writers. Westport, CT: Praeger Publishers, 2003.
- Backscheider, Paula R., and John Richetti, eds. Popular Fiction by Women, 1660–1730. Oxford: Oxford University Press, 1996.
- Busby, Margaret (ed.). Daughters of Africa: An International Anthology of Words and Writings by Women of African Descent from the Ancient Egyptian to the Present. London: Jonathan Cape, 1992.
- Eagleton, Mary, ed., Feminist Literary Theory: A Reader. Oxford: Basil Blackwell, 1986.
- Fetterley, Judith, The Resisting Reader: A Feminist Approach to American Fiction. Indiana University Press, 1978.
- Figes, Eva,Sex and Subterfuge: Women Writers to 1850. The Macmillan Press, 1982.
- Ferguson, Mary Anne, [compiler]. Images of Women in Literature, 3rd Edition, Houghton-Mifflin Co. 1981. ISBN 0-395-29113-5
- Gilbert, Sandra M., and Susan Gubar, The Madwoman in the Attic: The Woman Writer and the Nineteenth Century Literary Imagination. Yale University Press, 1979. ISBN 0-300-08458-7
- Gilbert, Sandra M., and Susan Gubar, eds, The New Feminist Criticism: Essays on Women, Literature and Theory. London: Virago Press, 1989.
- Gilbert, Sandra M., and Susan Gubar. No Man's Land: The Place of the Woman Writer in the Twentieth Century. 2 vols. New Haven: Yale University Press, 1989.
- Gilbert, Sandra M., and Susan Gubar, eds, Norton Anthology of Literature by Women.
- Greer, Germaine, et al., eds. Kissing the Rod: an anthology of seventeenth-century women's verse. Farrar Straus Giroux, 1988.
- Hobby, Elaine, Virtue of Necessity: English women's writing 1649–1688. London: Virago Press, 1988. ISBN 0-86068-831-3
- Lonsdale, Roger, ed. Eighteenth Century Women Poets: An Oxford Anthology. New York: Oxford University Press, 1989.
- Moi, Toril, Sexual/ Textual Politics: Feminist Literary Theory. London: Methuen, 1987. ISBN 0-415-02974-0; ISBN 0-415-28012-5 (second edition).
- Robertson, Fiona, ed. Women's Writing, 1778–1838. Oxford: Oxford University Press, 2001.
- Russ, Joanna. How to Suppress Women's Writing. Austin: University of Texas Press, 1983.
- Spender, Dale, Mothers of the Novel: 100 good women writers before Jane Austen. London and New York: Pandora Press, 1986. ISBN 0-86358-081-5
- Showalter, Elaine, A Literature of their own: from Charlotte Bronte to Doris Lessing. London: Virago Press, 1977.
- Spacks, Patricia Meyer, The Female Imagination: A Literary and Psychological Investigation of women's writing. George Allen and Unwin, 1976.
- Spencer, Jane, The Rise of the Woman Novelist. Oxford: Basil Blackwell, 1986. ISBN 0-631-13916-8
- Sternburg, Janet [ed.]. The Writer on Her Work (New York: W.W. Norton, 2000) ISBN 9780393320558
- Todd, Janet, Feminist Literary History: A Defence. Cambridge: Polity Press / Basil Blackwell, 1988.
- Todd, Janet, The Sign of Angellica: women, writing and fiction, 1660-1800. London: Virago Press, 1989. ISBN 0-86068-576-4

=== Series of republications ===
- Broadview Press republish modern editions of classic works of literature as Broadview Editions (listed alphabetically by title and chronologically): a high proportion are works by women writers
- Collaborative publication: The Other Voice in Early Modern Europe. See the Chicago series (60 titles, 1996–2010), the Toronto series (over 75 volumes since 2009)
- Feminist Press: New York-based press which began reprinting books by American women in 1972
- Oxford University Press: The Schomburg Library of Nineteenth-Century Black Women Writers, ed. Henry Louis Gates Jr. 30 vols, Oxford University Press, 1988. A 10-volume Supplement was published in 1991.
- Oxford University Press: Women Writers in English 1350-1850 (scholarly texts priced for libraries)
- Pandora Press "Mothers of the Novel" series:
  - Mary Brunton, Discipline (1815; repr. 1986) ISBN 0-86358-105-6
  - Mary Brunton, Self-control (1810/11; repr. 1986) ISBN 0-86358-084-X
  - Frances Burney, The Wanderer; or Female Difficulties (1814; repr. 1988) ISBN 0-86358-263-X
  - Maria Edgeworth, Belinda (1801; repr. 1986) ISBN 0-86358-074-2
  - Maria Edgeworth, Helen (1834; repr. 1987) ISBN 0-86358-104-8
  - Maria Edgeworth, Patronage (1814; repr. 1986) ISBN 0-86358-106-4
  - Eliza Fenwick, Secrecy, or The Ruin of the Rock (1795; repr. 1988) ISBN 0-86358-307-5
  - Sarah Fielding, The Governess, or The Little Female Academy (1749; repr. 1987) ISBN 0-86358-182-X
  - Mary Hamilton, Munster Village (1778; repr. 1987) ISBN 0-86358-133-1
  - Mary Hays, Memoirs of Emma Courtney (1796; repr. 1987) ISBN 0-86358-132-3
  - Eliza Haywood, The History of Miss Betsy Thoughtless (1751; repr. 1986) ISBN 0-86358-090-4
  - Elizabeth Inchbald, A Simple Story (1791; repr. 1987) ISBN 0-86358-136-6
  - Harriet Lee and Sophia Lee, The Canterbury Tales (1797–1805; repr. 1989) ISBN 0-86358-308-3
  - Charlotte Lennox, The Female Quixote, or the Adventures of Arabella (1752; repr. 1986) ISBN 0-86358-080-7
  - Sydney Owenson, The O’Briens and the O’Flahertys: A National Tale (1827; repr. 1988) ISBN 0-86358-289-3
  - Sydney Owenson, The Wild Irish Girl (1806; repr. 1986) ISBN 0-86358-097-1
  - Amelia Opie, Adeline Mowbray, or The Mother and Daughter (1804; repr. 1986) ISBN 0-86358-085-8
  - Frances Sheridan, Memoirs of Miss Sidney Bidulph (1761; repr. 1987) ISBN 0-86358-134-X
  - Charlotte Turner Smith, Emmeline: The Orphan of the Castle (1788; repr. 1989) ISBN 0-86358-264-8
  - Charlotte Turner Smith, The Old Manor House (1793; repr. 1987) ISBN 0-86358-135-8
- Persephone Books : London-based press which "reprints forgotten classics by twentieth-century (mostly women) writers. The titles are chosen to appeal to busy women who rarely have time to spend in ever-larger bookshops and who would like to have access to a list of books designed to be neither too literary nor too commercial."
- Routledge: The Early Modern Englishwoman, 1500–1750: Contemporary Editions, The Early Modern Englishwoman: A Facsimile Library of Essential Works for the Study of Early Modern Women (three multi-part series), and Chawton House Library: Women's Novels
- Rutgers University Press American Women Writers Series
- University of Kentucky Press series of Eighteenth-Century Novels by Women
- Virago Press since 1975 has republished over 500 post-1800 classics of women's literature (see their list and their timeline) in their series Virago Modern Classics.

=== Web-based projects ===
- British Women Romantic Poets, 1789 – 1832
- Canada's Early Women Writers
- "A Celebration of Women Writers". University of Pennsylvania: A Celebration of Women Writers.
- Chawton House Library
- Corvey Women Writers on the Web
- Early Modern Women's Poetry
- Emory Women Writers Resource Project
- ARTFL French Women Writers Project
- Girlebooks: free ebooks by women writers
- Internet Women's History Sourcebook
- ARTFL Italian Women Writers Project
- Links to Digitizing Projects of Women Writers
- Medieval Women Writers in Latin Archived 2007-02-19 at the Wayback Machine
- The Orlando Project: A History of Women's Writing in the British Isles Archived 2013-01-20 at the Wayback Machine
- The Perdita Project
- Project Electra, Oxford University (under construction)
- Project Continua
- The Victorian Women Writers Project
- The Victorian Women Writers Letters Project Archived 2007-06-27 at the Wayback Machine
- Voices from the Gaps: Women Artists and Writers of Color
- Women Writers of Early Canada Archived 2007-02-07 at the Wayback Machine
- Women Writers Project
- Women Romantic-Era Writers
- Women’s Travel Writing 1830-1930 Archived 2007-03-15 at the Wayback Machine
- The Women Writers Archive: Early Modern Women Writers Online Archived 2006-11-07 at the Wayback Machine
- Women Writers Resource Project

=== Scholarly journals ===
The following journals publish research on women's writing mainly or exclusively:

- ABO:Interactive Journal for Women in Arts, 1640-1830
- Atlantis
- Camera Obscura. Duke UP. ISSN 0270-5346
- Contemporary Women's Writing Oxford University Press ISSN 1754-1476
- Critical Matrix: The Princeton Journal of Women, Gender, and Culture
- differences: a journal of feminist cultural studies. Duke University Press. ISSN 1040-7391
- Feminist Europa. Review of Books
- Feminist Studies
- Femspec: speculative fiction
- Frontiers: a journal of women studies. University of Nebraska Press. ISSN 0160-9009
- Genders
- Hecate: A Women's Interdisciplinary Journal (Australian)
- International Journal of Women's Studies (1978–1985)
- Irish Feminist Review
- The Korean Society for Feminist Studies in English Literature
- Legacy. University of Nebraska Press. ISSN 0748-4321
- Nineteenth-Century Gender Studies
- Signs: Journal of Women in Culture and Society (1975–2015)
- Tulsa Studies in Women's Literature. ISSN 0732-7730
- WILLA: The Women in Literacy and Life Assembly of The National Council of Teachers of English
- Women in the Arts
- Women's Review of Books Archived 2007-03-07 at the Wayback Machine
- Women Writers ISSN 1535-8402
- Women's Writing ISSN 0969-9082 / ISSN 1747-5848

=== Literary and review journals of women's writing ===
- Australian Women's Book Review
- BlueStockings Journal (Seitô-sha), founded in 1911
- Calyx (1976–)
- Fireweed (1977–)
- Kalliope, a journal of women's literature & art
- PMS poemmemoirstory (formerly Astarte, 1989–2000)
- Room of One's Own (1975–)
- So to Speak
- Tiger Lily (1986–)
- Women's Review of Books Archived 2007-03-07 at the Wayback Machine (1983–)

== See also ==
- Écriture féminine
- English literature
- Feminist film theory
- Feminist literary criticism
- Feminist movement
- Feminist science fiction
- Feminist theory
- Gender in science fiction
- History of feminism
- Lesbian literature
- Literary criticism
- The Women's Library (London)
- Turkish women writers
- Women artists
- Women in science fiction
- Women letter writers
- Women science fiction authors
- Women's cinema
- Women's fiction
- Women's music
- Women's studies

=== Lists ===
- List of biographical dictionaries of women writers
- List of early-modern British women novelists
- Chronology of early-modern British women playwrights
- List of early-modern British women playwrights
- List of early-modern British women poets
- List of female detective characters
- List of female detective/mystery writers
- List of feminist literature
- List of lesbian periodicals
- List of lesbian periodicals in the United States
- List of LGBT periodicals
- List of literary awards
- List of modernist writers
  - list of modernist women writers
- List of organizations for women writers
- List of transgender publications
- List of women rhetoricians
- List of women writers
- List of women's presses
