= Women's fiction =

Book genre

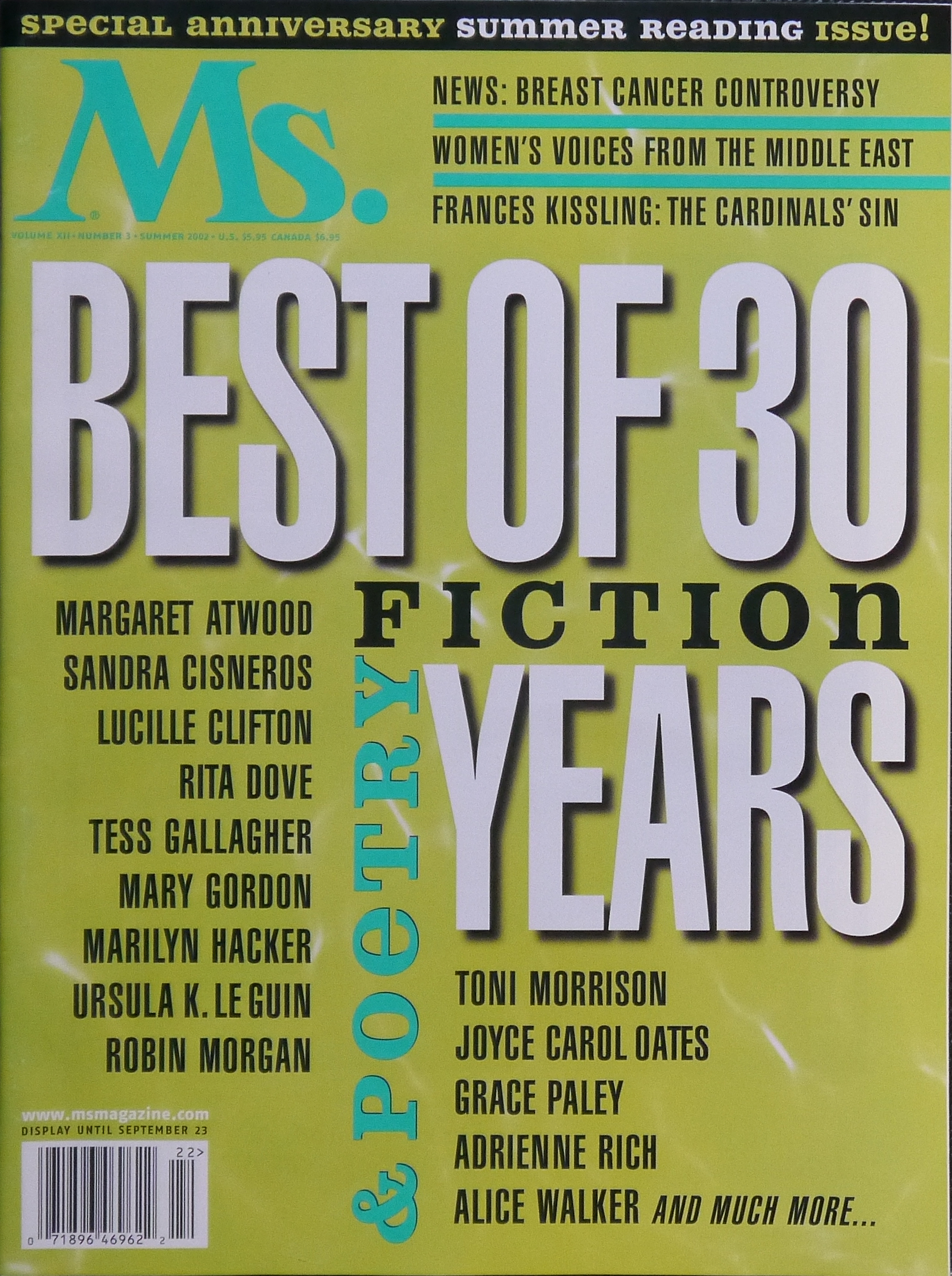
Women's fiction edition of Ms. magazine in 2002

Women's fiction is an umbrella term for women-centered books that focus on women's life experience and are marketed to female readers. It is distinct from women's writing, which refers to literature written by (rather than promoted to) women. The women's fiction genre has changed throughout history as the role of women has changed. Contemporary women's fiction is popular in part due to the large number of sub-genres, giving readers a large variety to choose from. The term women's fiction is criticized, as there exists no comparable label in English for works of fiction that are marketed to men.

== History of women's fiction ==
The genre of women's fiction has changed throughout history as the role of women has changed. Although fiction, the literature within the genre has always reflected real concerns and desires of women. In some cases these may be romantic desires, they may be desires for social change and improvement, or they may be personal desires. In any case, the specifics change depending on the historical context from which the text was written, revealing what was socially acceptable for women to desire at specific points in history.

Although less common than men, women have been publishing literature in the US since the days of the colonies. Women wrote and published about a variety of topics, both fiction and non-fiction. Before 1900, the majority of women publishing any form of literature were white and protestant. Many of these early women's fiction novels were written to be educational, as they often included overly curious female protagonists who were excited to learn, and as their knowledge about various subjects grew, so did the readers'.

The interwar period of women's fiction was defined by literary critic Nicola Beauman as "a category of fiction written for women – ‘the women’s novel’ ... They generally have little action and less histrionics – they are about the ‘drama of the undramatic’, the steadfast dailyness of a life that brings its own rewards, the intensity of the emotions and, above all, the importance of human relationships." During this period, a trend developed of middle class women writing for other middle class women. This resulted in the use of close, personal dialogue, as if the author was writing to a friend. This intimate address became a common trait in women's fiction, still used today.

The post-war period led to the increase in popularity of the women's fiction genre, as there was now an international trade of books. The role of women changed drastically post-war. More women were working in the post-war period than ever before, causing a shift in the traditional role of women in society, and therefore the gender dynamics within relationships as well. Women no longer relied on men to the same extent they had pre-war, which was reflected in the women's fiction of the time. The female protagonists of post-war women's fiction were increasingly independent. They took on both the traditionally male and female roles of the house and were free without men. Not only did the female protagonists change, but so did the male ones. The traditional heroes of romance novels no longer existed post-war. Now, a considerate, good citizen like a doctor was the epitome of attractiveness. This post-war change in the desires of fictional women reflects the change in desires of real women post-war.

The decades of the 1960's and 70's brought new changes for women which found their way into women's fiction literature. The female protagonists of women's fiction novels were now sexually liberated. As the hormonal birth control pill became accessible for women in the 1960's they experienced sexual liberation and could now choose to have sex without having to worry about pregnancy. This was not the only new freedom found in the women's fiction of the time though, many novels began depicting single mothers: independent characters who do not rely on their husbands to help raise a family, and apprehensive pregnant women: characters who do not want to have children or who feel unsure about having children. Then, the 70's introduced a sub-genre of women's fiction known as the college girl novel. This sub-genre aligns with the passing of Title IX, which caused an increase in women seeking higher education.

== Contemporary women's fiction ==
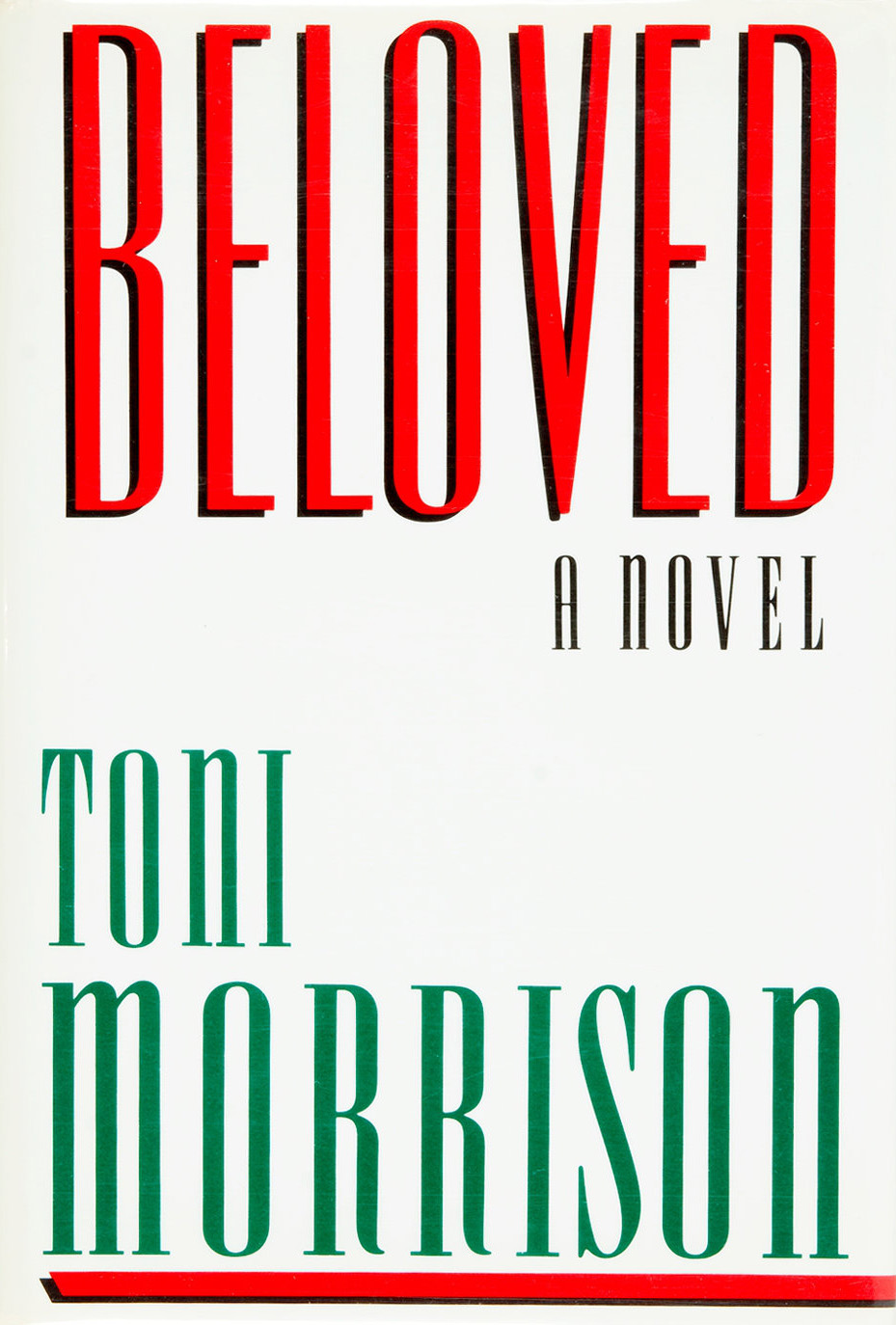
Beloved novel by Toni Morrison.

=== Sub-genres of contemporary women's fiction ===
There are many sub-genres of women's fiction, one popular one is historical fiction. The historical fiction sub-genre remains a reflection of the desires and concerns of women. Specifically, the sub-genre imagines a world in which history was presented without the silencing of women. Within the context of women's fiction, historical fiction acts as an outlet for underrepresented groups, like women, to revisit historical events which have been taught through a largely white male perspective and write them into fiction with the perspective of women. This re-writing of historical events from an underrepresented perspective is Adrienne Rich's idea of re-vision: “Re-vision—the act of looking back, of seeing with fresh eyes, of entering an old text from a new critical direction—is for women more than a chapter in cultural history: it is an act of survival.” A popular and highly influential example is the novel Beloved by Toni Morrison, an influential historical fiction novel that re-visions affects of slavery from a women's perspective. The act of re-visioning in the historical fiction sub-genre is a way to reclaim and avenge women's history.

Another sub-genre of women's fiction is chick-lit. This sub-genre of contemporary women's fiction gained popularity in the 1990's with the release of Helen Fielding's novel Bridget Jones's Diary. This sub-genre centers around a single working woman and follows the progression of her professional and romantic journey. Chick-lit novels are characterized by their witty humor and relatable protagonists. However, the term chick-lit is no longer widely used due to the sexist undertones it contains which cause novels of the genre to be taken less seriously than they would otherwise if they remained un-gendered.

== Definitions of the term ==
The Romance Writers of America organization defines women's fiction as, "a commercial novel about a woman on the brink of life change and personal growth. Her journey details emotional reflection and action that transforms her and her relationships with others, and includes a hopeful/upbeat ending with regard to her romantic relationship."

The Women's Fiction Writers' Association gives a broader and more inclusive definition, in which romance elements are not mandatory: "Whereas the driving force of a romance novel is a love story, a mystery's is the exposure of an event, a thriller's is a fear-inducing chase or escape, etc., the driving force of women's fiction is the protagonist's journey toward a more fulfilled self."

== Criticism of the term ==
While the women's fiction label is embraced by some authors, others have argued that it is applied too broadly to works by women that would otherwise be considered literary fiction, and therefore marginalizes women's writing. Critics point to the lack of an equivalent term for men's works, and that men's works are rarely if ever considered women's fiction even if they fall within the parameters of the genre. Author Jennifer Weiner has been a vocal critic of the term, which she believes leads to books written by women receiving less publicity, fewer reviews, and lower esteem than those written by men. Women's fiction has been compared to chick lit, a term that has since fallen out of favor.

== See also ==
- Gynocriticism
- List of modernist women writers
- List of women's magazines
- List of women writers
- Women's writing (literary category)
- Chick lit
