= The Gentlewoman =

Defunct British women's weekly magazine

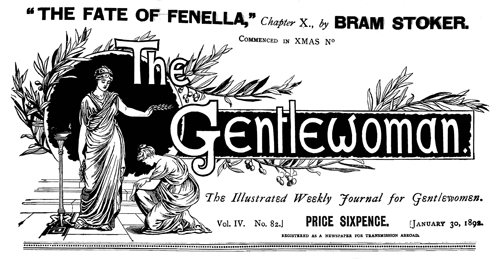
The Gentlewoman dated January 30, 1892, advertised Bram Stoker's contribution to an unusual novel, The Fate of Fenella

The Gentlewoman was a weekly illustrated paper for women founded in 1890 and published in London.

For its first thirty-six years its full title was The Gentlewoman: An Illustrated Weekly Journal for Gentlewomen. In 1926 it was briefly renamed Gentlewoman and Modern Life, and ceased publication later the same year, to be merged with Eve: The Lady's Pictorial.

There were also similarly titled but unrelated US publications: The Gentlewoman: The Home Magazine, pre-1898 to September 1937; and The Gentlewoman: A Magazine of Feminine Facts and Fiction, circa 1927.

== History ==
Publishing its first issue on 12 July 1890, The Gentlewoman soon established a reputation for good writing. On 15 December 1891 The Times reported that its Christmas number had

...stories, all illustrated in colours, by Mr Farjeon, Mr Grant Allen, Mr Doyle, Lord Brabourne, Miss Florence Warden, Mrs Campbell Praed, Mr Henry Herman, and Mr A. J. Pask, and the beginning of a novel, produced under exceptional conditions, "The Fate of Fenella".

This unusual "consecutive novel", in which each chapter was written by a different author, was serialized between December 1891 and April 1892. The Gentlewoman's editor, Joseph Snell Wood, devised the idea and arranged for male and female writers to alternate in developing the narrative–although one of the men in the list, "Frank Danby", was in fact a woman. Those he secured for the project included Bram Stoker, Frances Eleanor Trollope, Florence Marryat, Mrs Hungerford, Arthur Conan Doyle, and Mary Eliza Kennard. Stoker's chapter, called "Lord Castleton Explains", appeared in January 1892. The Times commented at the outset that "The result of so peculiar an experiment will be awaited with some curiosity." The complete work was published as a three volume novel by Hutchinson of London in May 1892, and a review of it noted the absence of a controlling mind.

In 1892 The Gentlewoman employed E. W. Hornung, later famous as the creator of A. J. Raffles, as an assistant editor.

In 1893 the paper launched a campaign against "tight-lacing", the fad for ever-smaller waists created by very tight corsets, which it described as "this modern madness" and "this pernicious habit".

In 1894 the editor, J. S. Wood, founded the Society of Women Journalists. In May of the same year, the paper published The Gentlewoman Handbook of Education: What a Parent Should Know, by "Dominie".

In 1895 Margaret Wolfe Hungerford's novel A Point of Conscience first appeared as a serial in The Gentlewoman. In November of that year, Mary Anne Keeley addressed a ninetieth birthday message to her fellow-actresses by way of a letter to The Gentlewoman which was reported in The Times.

J. S. Wood and A. J. Warden were reported to be the proprietors of The Gentlewoman in 1896.

In July 1897 Arthur Mulliner took two of the paper's women journalists from Northampton to London in a Daimler, and they asked why he called the car "she". When he replied that it was because "it took a man to manage her", they proved him wrong by both taking a turn at the wheel and later reported the journey to have been like "tobogganing or riding on a switchback railway".

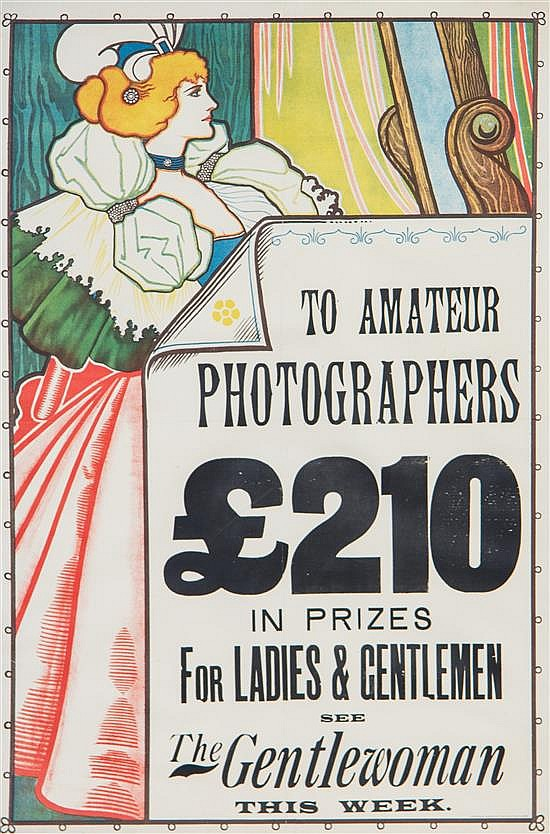
The Gentlewoman competition poster, 1898

In 1898, preference shares in the paper were listed on the London Stock Exchange. Also in 1898, the Grafton Galleries hosted an exhibition of the winning images from the paper's photographic competition, open to amateur photographers only. The Gentlewoman had offered two hundred guineas in prizes, equivalent to £22,585 in 2023, and the judges were H. P. Robinson, Viscount Maitland, and the Rev. F. C. Lambert. The Gentlewoman celebrated the Diamond Jubilee of Queen Victoria with The Gentlewoman's Record of the Glorious Reign of Victoria the Good, by the paper's editor, J. S. Wood. The next year, 1898, the London periodical Truth reported that

"The Gentlewoman has gained for itself a reputation and position of stability which is without parallel in the history of any similar Journal, having regard to the number of years it has been established. Its high tone and artistic and literary excellence have made it a popular weekly newspaper."

In 1900 the paper published the first instalment of Marie Bashkirtseff's journals and letters to Guy de Maupassant, and Lord Alfred Douglas's friend T. W. H. Crosland was a regular contributor.

In 1902 the popular novelist Marie Corelli wrote to the editor of The Gentlewoman to complain that her name had been left out of a list of the guests in the Royal Enclosure at the Braemar Highland Gathering, and she suspected that this had been done intentionally. Wood replied from his office in the Strand that her name had indeed been left out intentionally, because of her own stated contempt for the press and for the snobbery of those wishing to appear in the "news puffs" of society events. Both letters were published in full in the next issue of the paper.

In 1906 the composer Marian Arkwright received a prize from The Gentlewoman for her orchestral work called The Winds of the World. Doctor Caroline Matthews was one of those who supported The Gentlewoman's Children's Salon and her associates wrote about Matthew's bravery 'Sturdily the stranger in the camp, [she] worked with a will, sharing the hardship of the men.' which won her medals from the King of Italy when providing relief during the 1908 Messina earthquake. Matthews was to later write a longer article on her war experiences as a volunteer surgeon, titled 'A Lady Doctor at the Front', in the Balkans war 1912-13.

In June 1918, it was through The Gentlewoman that Princess Mary announced she was to train as a nurse at the Great Ormond Street Hospital.

In 1919 the paper gave its name to "The Gentlewoman Tournament", the first Girls Amateur Championship, which was won by Audrey Croft. The competition had been first organised before the war, but now with golf enthusiast Mabel Stringer as the Gentlewoman's Sports editor the competition took off at Stoke Poges. In 1925 it was organized from the offices of the paper, then based at 69–77 Long Acre, London WC2. The competition continued at Stoke Poges until 1938.

J. S. Wood died in December 1920, still in office as chairman and managing director of The Gentlewoman, aged 67, and was succeeded by his son H. C. P. Wood.

At the beginning of 1926, The Gentlewoman merged with another magazine to become renamed Gentlewoman and Modern Life, but only seven months later it was merged again with Eve: The Lady's Pictorial and later ceased publication altogether. The last issue was dated 7 August 1926. In April 1927, H. C. P. Wood took The Gentlewoman Illustrated Limited into voluntary liquidation, and the company was wound up.

Britannia and Eve magazine launched on 1 May 1929 and ceased publication in January 1957.

== See also ==
- The Gentleman's Magazine
