= The Fate of Fenella =

Experiment in consecutive novel writing

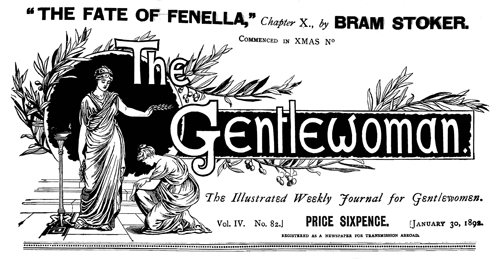
The Gentlewoman of January 30, 1892, advertising Bram Stoker's contribution to The Fate of Fenella

The Fate of Fenella was an experiment in consecutive novel writing inspired by J. S. Wood and published in his magazine The Gentlewoman in twenty-four parts between 1891 and 1892 in London.

When first published in book form its title was The Fate of Fenella: by Twenty-four Authors. It was first published in London by Hutchinson and Company and by the Cassell Publishing Company in New York in 1892. The authors who contributed chapters included Bram Stoker, Frances Eleanor Trollope and Sir Arthur Conan Doyle.

== Background ==
The novel first appeared as a twenty-four part serial in J. S. Wood's weekly magazine, The Gentlewoman, in 1891 and 1892. Each of the authors wrote one chapter and passed the novel on to the next person in line. The odd-numbered chapters were written by women, and the even-numbered chapters by men, thus alternating in developing the narrative – although one of the men in the list, "Frank Danby", was in fact a woman. The completed work was republished as a three-volume novel by Hutchinson & Co. of London in May 1892, with a review noting the absence of a controlling mind. The novel was also published in Germany that year by Bernhard Tauchnitz in Leipzig in English.

== Contemporary review ==
The following review appeared in The Spectator in May 1892:

The result has been a fairly readable novel, that tells an extremely silly story. The plot is ridiculous; the characters waver and change from chapter to chapter; but there are occasionally strong situations, and scraps of fairly good dialogue. On the whole, however, the book is an amusing one; more amusing still when the reader remembers the conditions under which it has been written, and the difficulties with which the separate authors had to contend.

== The chapters ==
The quotation marks in some chapter titles are as shown in the book (from the "cheap" edition of August 1892 by J. S. Wood)

1. Helen Mathers, "Fenella"
2. Justin McCarthy, Kismet
3. Frances Eleanor Trollope, How it strikes a contemporary
4. Arthur Conan Doyle, "Between two fires"
5. May Crommelin, Complications
6. F. C. Phillips, A woman's view of the matter
7. “Rita”, So near — so far away
8. Joseph Hatton, The tragedy
9. Mrs. Lovett Cameron, Free once again
10. Bram Stoker, Lord Castleton explains
11. Florence Marryat, Madame de Vigny's revenge
12. Frank Danby, To live or die?
13. Mrs. Edward Kennard, "The scars remained"
14. Richard Dowling, Derelict
15. Mrs. Hungerford, Another rift
16. Arthur A'Beckett, In New York
17. Jean Middlemass, Confined in a madhouse
18. Clement Scott, "Within sight of home"
19. Clo. Graves, A vision from the sea
20. H. W. Lucy, Through fire and water
21. Adeline Sergeant, "Alive or dead?"
22. George Manville Fenn, Retribution
23. "Tasma", Sick unto death
24. F. Anstey, "Whom the gods hate die hard"
