= Eve (magazine) =

Defunct British illustrated women monthly magazine

- Categories: Women's magazine
- Frequency: Monthly
- First issue: 2000
- Final issue: 2008
- Company: Haymarket Media Group
- Country: United Kingdom
- Based in: London
- Language: English

Eve was an illustrated magazine for women published in London. It is not to be confused with Eve: The Lady's Pictorial, a 1920s magazine later merged with The Gentlewoman and ultimately retitled Britannia and Eve.

Eve was launched by BBC Worldwide, the commercial arm of the BBC, in 2000. It was created under a working title Project Urma, the first edition was dated September 2000 and was sold on newsstands from early August 2000.

As with much BBC activity at the time, the magazine attracted criticism from those who believed that the broadcaster was over-reaching by using its licence-fee funded programming to promote commercial activities, harming other businesses.

Although the magazine was a circulation success, a 2005 restructuring of the BBC led to the decision to sell the title as it didn't directly support a programme. Haymarket Media Group purchased Eve with the intention of building a women's magazine business around the publication.

Haymarket's stewardship of Eve was not a success, and circulation started to decline. In April 2008, there was an overhaul which saw a new masthead and a revamped format, but the 2008 financial crisis and the advertising downturn which followed made the title too unprofitable for Haymarket, and in September 2008 the company announced its closure.
