= Society of Women Writers and Journalists =

UK society for women writers, established 1894

- Abbreviation: SWWJ
- Formation: 1 May 1894; 132 years ago
- Founder: J. S. Wood
- Type: Learned society
- Headquarters: Polegate, East Sussex
- Location: United Kingdom
- President: The Baroness Benjamin OM DBE DL
- Vice Presidents: Pamela Birley; Doris Corti; Valerie Dunmore; Barbara Field-Holmes; Sylvia Kent; Mary Rensten; Doreen Friend; Pamela Payne; Benita Cullingford
- Patrons: Sir Tim Rice; The Earl of Stockton; Simon Brett OBE FRSL; Lady Howard of Lympne; Freya North; Christopher Mulvey
- Affiliations: The Authors' Licensing and Collecting Society; Chawton House; The National Liberal Club; London Press Club
- Website: Official website
- Formerly called: Society of Women Journalists

Society of Women Writers & Journalists (SWWJ) is a British learned society for professional women writers.

The society's aims include the "encouragement of literary achievement, the upholding of professional standards, and social contact with fellow writers and others in the field". It was founded as the Society of Women Journalists in 1894 by J. S. Wood, the editor of The Gentlewoman. Original members included Mary Frances Billington, Lady Colin Campbell, Mrs. Frank Leslie, Henrietta Stannard, Charlotte O'Conor Eccles, Marie Belloc, Madeline Greenwood, Lady Violet Grevile, and Mrs. Jack Johnson. Charlotte Humphry was the organisation's first president. Rita Shell served as vice-president, and later Constance Hoster. Helen Colt was their Paris representative in the interwar period.

The society began publishing a thrice yearly house magazine, Woman Journalist, in 1910. The society adopted its current name in 1954. The magazine's title was changed to Woman Writer in 2000.

Since 2004, men who are published writers have been able to join the society as associate members.
