= List of organizations for women writers =

This is a list of organizations, conferences, and prizes for women writers.

== Organizations and conferences ==
- Broad Universe
- Hedgebrook
- International Women's Writing Guild (1976–)
- Kali for Women (1984–)
- Kentucky Women Writers Conference (1979–)
- Philippine American Women Writers and Artists (1991–1998)
- Sisters in Crime (1986–)
- Wiscon
- Women's Library (London)

== Literary awards which focus on gender ==
- Lambda Literary Award: LGBT themes
- Otherwise Award: SFF which focuses on gender
- Pat Lowther Award
- Susan Smith Blackburn Prize: women playwrights
- Tagea Brandt Rejselegat: Danish award for women academics and writers
- Willa Literary Award: American award presented by Women Writing the West (WWW)
- Women's Prize for Fiction: Awarded to women writers

== See also ==
- Women's writing in English
