= Mabel Stringer =

- by Swaine
- Born: 25 September 1868; New Romney, Kent, England
- Died: 10 February 1958 (aged 89); Walmer, Kent, England
- Occupation: sports journalist
- Known for: golf enthusiast and administrator

Mabel Emily Stringer (25 September 1868 – 10 February 1958) was a British golf enthusiast and sporting journalist. She founded a number of golf organisations and served on others.

== Life ==
Stringer was born in New Romney in 1868. Her parents were Harriet and Henry Stringer and she was the first of seven. Her father was a solicitor. She was interested in outdoor pursuits including cricket and shooting her catapult. By the time the local Littlestone Ladies' Club was formed in 1891 she had discovered her love for the game and she became the captain just four years after the men's team had been formed.

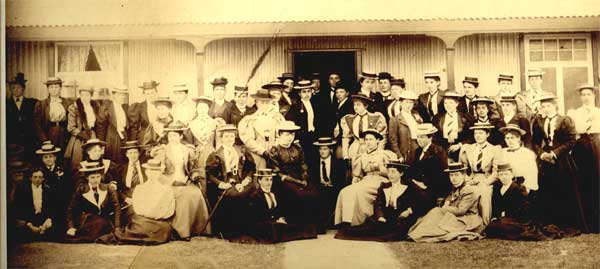
The second national ladies' golf championship in 1894

In 1894 whilst she was still captain the second national ladies' golf championship was hosted at Littlestone. Stringer was unaware of the championship until she hosted the Ladies' Golf Union's secretary Issette Pearson when she came to Littlestone to inspect the course. Stringer beat her on their first game together and they became friends and colleagues. Pearson was a runner up that year and Stringer made her debut at a national championship. The golfers played in leather bound skirts and hats and were required to change in a corrugated iron building as women were not allowed in the clubhouse.

Stringer became an active member of the Ladies' Golf Union and during her time the union developed a handicap system that was much more rigorous than the system developed for men. She competed nearly every year in the national championship but she was rarely a top player. She held the (joint) woman's course record at Littlestone and in 1902 she was on the national team for the international golf cup. She had missed the national the year before and a match against Scotland due to illness. The following year she was asked to report on a golf championship by a newspaper. More work followed. She was working as a ladies companion but by 1906 she was making a good living from journalism. At the beginning her reports went to the society pages of a wide range of periodicals but in time women's golf was mentioned in newspaper's sports sections.

In 1909 Littlestone golf club finally replaced the corrugated iron facilities for women heated by a small oil stove and Stringer was keen to point out the improving facilities for women at other golf clubs.

In 1919 she was working for The Gentlewoman when it gave its name to "The Gentlewoman Tournament", which was won by Audrey Croft. The competition had been first organised (and cancelled) before the war by Stringer, but now she was the Gentlewoman's Sports editor the competition took off at Stoke Poges. The competition continued at Stoke Poges until 1938 and it became the UK's Girls Amateur Championship

In 1921 Stringer decided that women over fifty might appreciate having their own golf club and she founded the "Veteran Ladies Golf Club". The concept took off and by 1969 there was a VGLA in Scotland, in the Midlands, in "the North" and in the South of England.

In 1924 she published her autobiography "Golfing Reminiscences".

Stringer was unmarried and gave her time to many groups associated with women's golf. A fellow golfer Cecil Leitch, who was 30 years younger than her, gave her the nickname "Aunty Mabel" because of how she cared for younger golfers. Leitch served on the committee that created the "Women Golfers' Museum" following a suggestion in 1938 and Stringer chaired the committee and ensured it happened.

Stringer retired to a cottage in Kent that had electric lighting paid for by well wishers who raised the money when she retired. She died in Walmer in Kent in 1958.
