= J. S. Wood =

Joseph Snell Wood (4 January 1853 – 20 December 1920), usually known as J. S. Wood, was a business man and journalist in London. For the last thirty years of his life he was the editor and publisher of The Gentlewoman, a prominent illustrated paper for women which he had founded in 1890, and he was also chairman of Press Printers Limited.

Outside his business, Wood founded the Society of Women Journalists and was one of the instigators of the Primrose League. He was also an active member of several hospital charities.

== Life ==
Born in Stepney, the first son of another Joseph Wood, by his marriage to Elizabeth, a daughter of Andrew Snell, of Sandford, Devon, Wood's early work was connected with a variety of charitable hospitals in London. From 1888 to 1916 he was Deputy Chairman of the Royal Irish Industries Association, which helped people working in cottage industries in Ireland.

In 1890, Wood established a new illustrated paper for women, The Gentlewoman, which he managed. This became the focal point of Wood's publishing career, and The Gentlewoman was successful in attracting many well-known writers of the day. At the very outset, he showed an innovative touch by serialising a novel in the paper's first twenty issues, unusual in two ways: not only was it written by readers of the paper, instead of professional writers, but a different reader wrote each chapter. In 1891 this notion was developed further when he commissioned a serial novel called The Fate of Fenella, for which twenty-four writers including Arthur Conan Doyle, Bram Stoker, and Mrs Trollope each produced one chapter "without any plan or collaboration".

In 1894 Wood founded the Society of Women Journalists, which only two years later had more than two hundred members. A Conservative in politics, he was a member of the Carlton Club and of the Grand Council of the Primrose League, of which Douglas Sladen called him "one of the real founders".

To celebrate the Diamond Jubilee of Queen Victoria, Wood wrote and published The Gentlewoman's Record of the Glorious Reign of Victoria the Good.

In 1902, the novelist Marie Corelli wrote to Wood as editor of The Gentlewoman to complain that her name had been left out of a list of the guests in the Royal Enclosure at the Braemar Highland Gathering. Wood replied that her name had been left out intentionally, because of her own stated contempt for the press and her past objections to the snobbery of those who liked to appear in the "news puffs" of society events. He printed both letters in full in the next issue of The Gentlewoman.

== Voluntary work ==
Between 1886 and his death in 1920 Wood was a member of the Council of the Chelsea Hospital for Women and for five years was Honorary Secretary of the Foundation of the Bolingbroke Hospital. He also served on the visiting committee of King Edward VII's Hospital and was a member of the Council of the Hospitals Association. In 1890 he founded the Children's Salon, a charitable organisation which endowed cots in children's hospitals around the country. Wood stated in Who's Who that he had initiated and organised schemes which had raised almost half a million pounds for a variety of philanthropic bodies, which at that time was a gigantic sum.

Wood's family motto was Non sibi sed aliis ("not for self but for others").

== Family and death ==
In 1875, Wood married Elena Maria Umiltà Ambuchi of Florence, a daughter of the sculptor Torello Ambuchi, described by Sladen as "his pretty Italian wife". They had one son, Harold Charles Putney Wood (born 1881), and three daughters, Florence Elena Elizabeth, Ethel Violet Elise, and Mabel Fanny Louise. Wood sent his son to Uppingham, and in 1911 they were both directors of The Gentlewoman Illustrated Limited. In 1918, H. C. P. Wood was a director of the Newspaper Press, from which his father had retired. H. C. P. Wood was chairman of The Gentlewoman Illustrated Limited in April 1927 when the company was wound up.

Wood died on 20 December 1920, aged 67, after a long illness, still chairman and managing director of The Gentlewoman and of Press Printers, Limited. He died at 26 Kensington Court, London. The funeral was at Holy Trinity Church, Prince Consort Road, on 23 December. His wife had died in 1919.
