= List of modernist women writers =

The term Modernism describes the modernist movement in the arts, its set of cultural tendencies and associated cultural movements, originally arising from wide-scale and far-reaching changes to Western society in the late 19th and early 20th centuries. In particular the development of modern industrial societies and the rapid growth of cities, followed then by the horror of World War I, were among the factors that shaped Modernism.

This is a partial list of modernist women writers.

- Anna Akhmatova (1889–1966), Russian poet
- Ingeborg Bachmann (1926–1973), Austrian poet and author
- Djuna Barnes (1892–1982), American novelist, playwright, etc.
- Kay Boyle (1902–1992), American novelist, poet, short story writer
- Bryher (1894–1983), British novelist, activist
- Mary Butts (1890–1937), British novelist
- Kate Chopin (1851–1904), American novelist, short story writer
- Baroness Elsa von Freytag-Loringhoven (1874–1927), German-American poet
- Forough Farrokhzad (1935–1967), Iranian poet, film director
- H.D. (1886–1961), American poet, novelist, memoirist
- Radclyffe Hall (1880–1943), British novelist, poet
- Lillian Hellman (1905–1984), American playwright, memoirist
- Ada Verdun Howell (1902–1981), Australian poet
- Zora Neale Hurston (1891–1960), American novelist
- Mary Hutchinson (1889–1977), British short story writer
- Else Lasker-Schüler (1869–1945), Jewish German poet
- Amy Lowell (1874–1925), American poet
- Mina Loy (1882–1966), British poet
- Edna St. Vincent Millay (1892–1950), American poet
- Hope Mirrlees (1887–1978), British poet
- Marianne Moore (1887–1972), American poet and essayist
- Adalgisa Nery (1905–1980), Brazilian poet and journalist
- Silvina Ocampo (1903–1994), Argentine poet, short-fiction writer
- Jean Rhys (1890–1979), Caribbean novelist
- Katherine Mansfield (1888–1923), New Zealand short story writer
- Dorothy Richardson (1873–1957), British novelist
- May Sinclair (1863–1946), British novelist and short story writer.
- Edith Sitwell (1887–1964), British poet and critic
- Gertrude Stein (1874–1946), American poet, playwright, essayist, etc.
- Edith Södergran (1892–1923) Swedish-speaking Finnish poet
- Edith Wharton (1862–1937), American novelist, short story writer
- Virginia Woolf (1882–1941), British novelist, essayist, short-fiction writer

== See also ==
- List of modernist writers
- List of modernist poets
- Modernist literature
- Women's writing (literary category)
