= Helen Colt =

British gardening columnist

Helen Colt (1882–1939) was a British newspaper columnist who was the first female gardening expert to have had a regular column in a British national newspaper. She contributed advice on gardening to the Daily Mail's women's page from 1912 to 1918. Following the First World War she founded the Garden League for Devastated France, an aid organisation dedicated to reconstructing French gardens through donations of seed and tools from the British. She was also the Paris representative for the Society of Women Writers and Journalists in the interwar period.

== Early life and education ==
Helen Colt was born in Hampstead in 1882, the daughter of barrister Frederick Hoare Colt. Following her father's death in 1907, Colt undertook training in horticulture at Royal Botanic Society's Practical Gardening School in Regent's Park, gaining a diploma as a result.

== Career ==
Subsequently, she set herself up as a freelance (or jobbing) gardener, working in and around Hampstead Garden Suburb. From there she began to build up a career in journalism to supplement her income and drawing on her experiences as a gardener. Consequently, she built a reputation as a trailblazer for professional women gardeners. An early piece published by Colt in Women’s Employment on ‘Women as Jobbing Gardeners’ emphasised the need for training and the importance of gaining experience through work. In subsequent articles, Colt would be referred to as the originator of the role of female jobbing gardener, thought she would later seek to quash the idea that she was the first female jobber.

From 1910, Colt's journalism would begin to take off. The Daily Mail had begun to promote gardening as part of its branding, and Colt's advice articles would increasingly be printed alongside articles by the likes of Percy Izzard and William Beach Thomas. From February 1912 to early 1918, the Mail generally printed two articles of gardening advice written by Colt a month, generally on a Saturday and on the magazine page of the paper, as part of a wider spread on gardening. She would continue to contribute similar pieces during the First World War, but the content of these shifted from floriculture to advice on growing vegetables, and by 1915, the content of her output was entirely dedicated to this subject. As a result of her journalistic work she acquired a small amount of fame and gave practical demonstrations to the public at the Royal Botanic Gardens in Regent's Park.

Towards the end of the war, Colt's life would take a new direction and she would adopt a new role in philanthropy that would absorb her time for many of the following years. In July 1917, she joined the Women's Auxiliary Army Corps and was sent as part of a contingent to tend war graves in France under direction from Kew Gardens. As a result, she would come into contact with Georges Truffaut, the Director General of Army Gardens on the French Front. With Truffaut she would pen the pamphlet, Army Gardens in France, Belgium, and Occupied German Territory. In 1920 she was invited by the French government to form an organisation dedicated to restoring the gardens in Northern France affected by the war and she relocated to Paris. The Association du Jardin de la France Dévastée (Garden League for Devastated France), which she led, focused on restoring school gardens and gardens belonging to communes and local horticultural societies. As part of this, Colt appealed for seed and garden implements from the British public and she ran a twinning scheme with British Schools. Her work in France continued into the 1930s.

== Death ==
Colt died on 26 July 1939 at St. Joseph's Nursing Home, Beaconsfield, Buckinghamshire, at the age of 57. She is buried in Hampstead Cemetery. Her obituary in The Times focused on her philanthropy and made no mention of her journalism.
