= Percy Izzard =

British writer (1877–1968)

Percy William David Izzard OBE (September 1877 – 17 June 1968) was the first regular agricultural and horticultural correspondent in the popular press and wrote for the Daily Mail for a period of 50 years. He authored several books on gardening.

== Biography ==
Percy Izzard studied at King's College London but dropped out and went looking for a job to support his family after his father died. He started as an errand boy for the Daily Express, and joined the Daily Mail in 1909 where he covered the funeral of Edward VII the following year.

His family was not able to identify at which point in his life Izzard turned to gardening and botanic. However, he was amongst the contributors to the Daily Mail's women's page from 1909 onwards, becoming a regular fixture alongside other contributors such as William Beach Thomas and Helen Colt. He was noted for his book Homeland: A Year of Country Days, a collection of 365 of his "Country Diary" columns from the Daily Mail, with black-and-white illustrations by his wife Florence Louise Izzard and Will G. Mein. Glorifying UK's great countrysides in the Daily Mail during World War I turned out to be an effective morale booster for the troops. During the 1920s, he moved into a house crafted to display his horticultural work. During World War II, he released Grow it Yourself: Daily Mail Practical Instruction Book on Food from the Garden in War-Time (1940) in the midst of the government's Grow More Food campaign.

In April 1953, he was sent in the Himalaya to report on the successful British Mount Everest expedition for the Daily Mail.

He was claimed by his son, the writer Ralph Izzard, to have been the inspiration for William Boot in the Evelyn Waugh novel "Scoop". He was an authority on roses and the Percy Izzard rose (hybrid tea rose) was named for him.

== Other roles ==
- Member of the Linnean Society
- Member of the Council of the Royal Bath and West of England Society

== Notable works ==
- Homeland: A Year of Country Days (1918)
- Daily Mail Garden Plans (1929)
- Breeds of British Poultry (1933)
- Grow it Yourself: Daily Mail Practical Instruction Book on Food from the Garden in War-Time (1940)
