= Thomas Duffus Hardy =

English archivist and antiquary (1804–1878)

Sir Thomas Duffus Hardy (22 May 1804 – 15 June 1878) was an English archivist and antiquary, who served as Deputy Keeper of the Public Record Office from 1861 to 1878.

== Life ==
Hardy was the third son of Major Thomas Bartholomew Price Hardy, from a naval family, and the older brother of William Hardy who had a parallel career as archivist. He was born on 22 May 1804 at Port Royal in Jamaica, and came to England in 1811. He entered the government service on 1 January 1819, obtaining on that date, through the influence of his uncle's brother, Samuel Lysons, a junior clerkship in the branch Record Office at the Tower of London; it was, however, from Henry Petrie (who soon after this succeeded Lysons at the Tower) that he received his education as an archivist. On Petrie's retirement, the compilation of the Monumenta Historica, published in 1848, was entrusted to him, and to this work he wrote the General Introduction.

While at the Tower Hardy also edited several publications of the Record Commission: the Close Rolls from 1204 to 1227 (1833–1844); the Patent Rolls for the reign of King John, 1201 to 1216, with an historical preface and itinerary of the king (1835); the Norman Rolls, 1200–1205 and 1417–1418 (1835); the Fine Rolls of the reign of John (1835); the Charter Rolls of the reign of John, with a descriptive introduction (1837); the Liberate Rolls for the same king's reign (1844); and the Modus Tenendi Parliamentum (1846).

Hardy's proficiency in palaeographic knowledge persuaded Lord Langdale, who was Master of the Rolls in 1838 (the date of the Public Record Office Act), to offer him the post of Deputy Keeper (i.e. chief executive officer) at the new Record Office; force of ministerial pressure, however, compelled Lord Langdale ultimately to appoint Sir Francis Palgrave to the post. Hardy succeeded Palgrave as Deputy Keeper on 15 July 1861, and held the appointment to his death. As the head of his department he did much to render the records already in the custody of the Master of the Rolls accessible to the public, and muniments of three palatinates: Durham, Lancaster, and Cheshire were brought up to London and thrown open to inspection during his tenure. The appointment of the Historical Manuscripts Commission in 1869 was also largely due to his influence, and he was one of the first commissioners.

== Honours ==
Hardy was knighted in 1869.

== Personal life ==
Hardy was married twice: first to Frances, daughter of Captain Charles Andrews; and second to Mary Anne, daughter of Charles MacDowell. His daughter Iza Duffus Hardy (1850–1922) was also a writer. He died on 15 June 1878.

== Publications ==
After his appointment as Deputy Keeper of the Record Office in 1861, Hardy edited, for the Rolls Series, A Descriptive Catalogue of MSS relating to the History of Great Britain and Ireland (1862–71), the Registrum Palatinum Dunelmense (1873–1878), and a Syllabus in English of Rymer's Foedera (1869); and he also commenced for the same series Lestorie des Engles solum Geffrei Gaimar. Besides these works he made reports on the documents preserved at Venice relating to English history, and on the collection of papers at the Bodleian Library.

Besides his work in connection with the public records, Hardy contributed to the controversy concerning the probable date of the Athanasian Creed. He argued in favour of the antiquity and authenticity of the manuscript of the creed formerly among the Cotton manuscripts and now in Utrecht University. In 1843, he prepared, under the title of A Catalogue of the Lords Chancellors, Keepers of the Great Seal, &c., a useful list of various legal officials in successive periods of history, and in 1852 published the life of his friend and patron, Lord Langdale.

Hardy edited the Close Rolls, Rotuli litterarum clausarum, 1204–1227 (2 vols., 1833–1844), with an introduction entitled "A Description of the Close Rolls, with an Account of the early Courts of Law and Equity"; and the Patent Rolls, Rotuli litterarum patentium, 1201–1216 (1835), with introduction, "A Description of the Patent Rolls, to which is added an Itinerary of King John." He also edited the Rotuli de oblatis etfinibus (1835), which deal also with the time of King John; the Rotuli Normanniae, 1200–1205, and 1417–1418 (1835), containing letters and grants of the English kings concerning the duchy of Normandy; the Charter Rolls, Rotuli chartarum, 1199–1216 (1837), giving with this work an account of the structure of charters; the Liberate Rolls, Rotuli de liberate ac de misis et praestitis regnante Johanne (1844); and the Modus Tenendi Parliamentum, with a translation (1846).

Hardy wrote A Catalogue of Lords Chancellors, Keepers of the Great Seal, Masters of the Rolls and Officers of the Court of Chancery (1843); the preface to Henry Petrie's Monumenta historica Britannica (1848); and Descriptive Catalogue of Materials relating to the History of Great Britain and Ireland (3 vols., 1862–1871).

Hardy edited William of Malmesbury's De gestis regum anglorum (2 vols., 1840); he continued and corrected John Le Neve's Fasti ecclesiae Anglicanae (3 vols., Oxford, 1854); and with Charles Trice Martin he edited and translated L'Estorie des Engles of Geoffrey Gaimar (1888–1889). He wrote Syllabus in English of Documents in Rymer's Foedera (3 vols., 1869–1885), and gave an account of the history of the public records from 1837 to 1851 in his Memoirs of the Life of Henry, Lord Langdale (1852). Hardy took part in the controversy about the date of the Athanasian Creed, writing The Athanasian Creed in connection with the Utrecht Psalter (1872); and Further Report on the Utrecht Psalter (1874).
