= Mary Anne Hardy =

English novelist and travel writer

Mary Anne, Lady Hardy
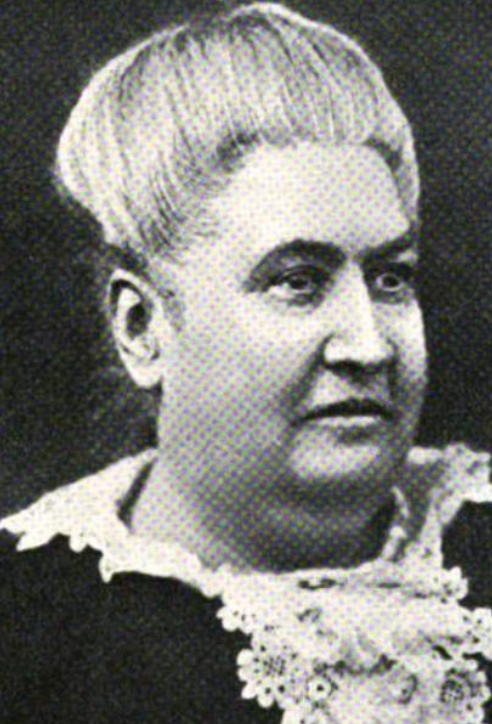
- Mary Anne Hardy, from an 1893 publication
- Born: Mary Anne MacDowell c. 1825; London, England
- Died: 19 May 1891; London, England
- Resting place: Willesden, London, England
- Citizenship: United Kingdom
- Occupation: Writer
- Spouse: Thomas Duffus Hardy
- Children: Iza Duffus Hardy
- Writing career
- Pen name: Addlestone Hill
- Language: English

Mary Anne, Lady Hardy (née MacDowell; c. 1825–1891), also known as Lady Duffus Hardy, with novels published under the pseudonym Addlestone Hill, was an English novelist and travel writer.

== Life ==
She was the only child of Charles MacDowell and Eliza, his second wife, born in Fitzroy Square, London, about 1825; her father had died five months before. She was entirely educated at home. She became the second wife of Sir Thomas Duffus Hardy, whom she married in 1850.

Sir Thomas died in 1878, and his widow received on 19 June 1879 a civil list pension, augmented in 1881. She died on 19 May 1891 at 124 Portsdown Road, London, and was buried at Willesden.

== Works ==
Lady Hardy's first significant novel, Paul Wynter's Sacrifice, was published in 1869, was a success, and was translated into French. A new edition came out in 1881. Her next novel, Daisy Nicholl (1870), achieved great success in America. In 1880 and 1881 she travelled in the United States. Her tours prompted two books, Through Cities and Prairie Lands: Sketches of an American Tour, 1881, and Down South, 1883.

Other works include:

- War Notes from the Crimea, 1855.
- The Artist's Family: an Historical Romance, 1857.
- A Casual Acquaintance: a Novel founded on Fact, 1866, 2 vols.
- A Hero's Work, 1868, 3 vols.
- Daisy Nichol: a novel, 1870, 3 vols.
- A Woman's Triumph, 1872, 3 vols.
- Lizzie, 1875, 3 vols.
- Madge, 1898, 3 vols.
- Beryl Fortescue, 1881, 3 vols.
- In Sight of Land, 1885, 3 vols.
- A Dangerous Experiment, 1888, 3 vols.
- A Buried Sin, 1894, 3 vols.

Lady Hardy wrote also articles on social topics, and short stories, for journals and magazines.

== Family ==
Iza Duffus Hardy, also known as a writer, was her daughter.

== Notes ==
Attribution This article incorporates text from a publication now in the public domain: Lee, Sidney, ed. (1901). "Hardy, Mary Anne". Dictionary of National Biography (1st supplement). Vol. 2. London: Smith, Elder & Co.
