= Mrs. Lovett Cameron =

English novelist

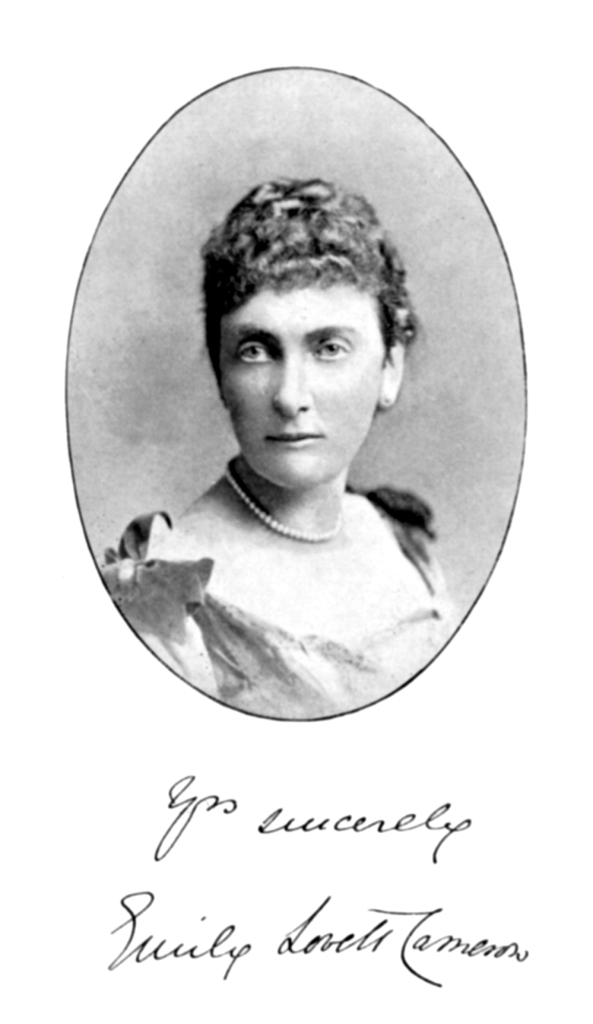
- Emily Lovett Cameron
- Born: c. 1844; London, England
- Died: 1921 (aged 76–77); Kensington, England
- Spouse: Henry Lovett Cameron
- Children: 2

Mrs. Lovett Cameron or Caroline Emily Sharp (c. 1844 – 1921) was an English novelist. She wrote more than fourteen three-volume novels.

== Life ==
Caroline Emily Sharp was born in 1844 in London to a well-off family who began her education by sending her to Paris at the age of six to learn French. In France she stayed in the Rue de Concelles with the Nizard family. Mr. Nizard later went on to be a French senator. She went to boarding school in England and then returned home. Her requests to become a writer were denied, despite the evidence that she preferred writing to needlework. At some time she and two of her brothers started a publication called the City Advertiser but it was discontinued after six months.

== Marriage ==
She married Henry Lovett Cameron who was a parliamentary agent in the Treasury in 1867. Her brother-in-law was Verney Lovett Cameron who was an explorer. Her own brother taught her to canoe and to scull.

At her husband's instigation she started to write, achieving moderate success with her first novel, Juliette's Guardian, which was published in a magazine and then as a book in 1877. This melodrama dealt with the affair between the 17-year-old Juliette Blair and her guardian Colonel Fleming. Lovett Cameron worked to a daily timetable, writing over forty books between 1877 and 1905. A later novel, In a Grass County, went to a ninth edition. The formula of her novels dealt with a relationship that hints at the emerging risk of sex and sin, but the narrative then backs off to deal with the emerging love and romance.

By the 1880s her brother-in-law, Verney, also took to writing, but he published books for boys.

She was known as "Emily" but she wrote under the name of "Mrs. Lovett Cameron". In 1891 she contributed a chapter to the unusual novel The Fate of Fenella, a three-volume novel created without discussion by twelve male and twelve female writers, including Bram Stoker and Arthur Conan Doyle.

Lovett Cameron's approach emphasised domesticity and the married woman's role. She was not a "New Woman" and her writings denigrated women of such a persuasion. In 1895 The Triumph of a Snipe Pie, better known as The Man who Didn't, was published. This story describes how a married man successfully resists the guiles of another woman. The book's title echoed the scandalous story The Woman Who Did by the Canadian writer Grant Allen which portrayed a "New Woman" favorably. Allen's book told of Herminia Barton, a woman who opted for "free love" because she refused to be a slave to any man.

Cameron's last published novel was 'Rosamond Grant' (1905). She died at her home in 1921.

== Novels ==
- Juliet's Guardian (1877)
- Deceivers Ever (1878)
- Poor Wisdom's Chance (1880)
- Worth Winning (1882)
- A North Country Maid (1884)
- Pure Gold (1884)
- A Dead Past (1885)
- In a Grass Country: A Story of Love and Sport (1885)
- The Lodge by the Sea (1885)
- Vera Nevill; or, Poor Wisdom's Chance (1885)
- The Cost of a Lie (1886)
- A Life's Mistake (1886)
- The Madness of Marriage: A Sketch (1886)
- A Devout Lover (1887)
- Neck or Nothing: A Hunting Story (1887)
- This Wicked World (1889)
- A Lost Wife (1889)
- Lord Elwyn's Daughter (1889)
- Jack's Secret (1891)
- Proved Unworthy (1891)
- Weak Woman (1892)
- A Daughter's Heart (1892)
- A Sister's Sin (1893)
- A Tragic Blunder (1894)
- A Bachelor's Bridal (1894)
- An Unselfish Woman (1894)
- A Bad Lot (1895)
- A Soul Astray (1895)
- A Vain Sacrifice (1895)
- The Man Who Didn't: The Triumph of a Snipe Pie (1895)
- Two Cousins and a Castle (1896)
- Little Lady Lee (1896)
- A Man's Undoing (1897)
- Devil's Apples (1898)
- The Ways of a Widow (1898)
- A Difficult Matter (1898)
- A Fair Fraud (1899)
- A Passing Fancy (1899)
- The Craze of Christina (1899)
- A Loyal Lover (1900)
- An Ill Wind (1901)
- Bitter Fruit (1901)
- Rosamond Grant (1905)
