= List of modernist poets =

Poets writing in the Modernist literary tradition

This is a list of major poets of the Modernist poetry.

== English-language Modernist poets ==
- Marion Angus
- W. H. Auden
- Djuna Barnes
- Rupert Brooke
- Basil Bunting
- Hart Crane
- E. E. Cummings
- H.D.
- Cecil Day-Lewis
- T. S. Eliot
- Roy Fisher
- Robert Frost
- Robert Graves
- Robert Hayden
- Gerard Manley Hopkins (precursor)
- A. E. Housman
- Langston Hughes
- T. E. Hulme
- David Jones
- Rudyard Kipling
- D. H. Lawrence
- Vachel Lindsay
- Amy Lowell
- Mina Loy
- Hugh MacDiarmid
- Archibald MacLeish
- Louis MacNeice
- Marianne Moore
- Vladimir Nabokov
- Wilfred Owen
- Dorothy Parker
- Mario Petrucci
- Ezra Pound
- E. A. Robinson
- Edna St. Vincent Millay
- Delmore Schwartz
- Edith Sitwell
- Kenneth Slessor
- Gertrude Stein
- Wallace Stevens
- Allen Tate
- Robert Penn Warren
- William Carlos Williams
- Yvor Winters
- W. B. Yeats
- Louis Zukofsky

== European Modernist poets ==
- Guillaume Apollinaire
- Louis Aragon
- Gottfried Benn
- André Breton
- Constantine Cavafy
- René Char
- Charles Baudelaire
- Robert Desnos
- Gunnar Ekelöf
- Paul Éluard
- Georg Heym
- Jakob van Hoddis
- Max Jacob
- Srečko Kosovel
- Benjamin Péret
- Saint-John Perse
- Fernando Pessoa
- Jacques Prévert
- Pierre Reverdy
- Rainer Maria Rilke
- Arthur Rimbaud
- Else Lasker-Schüler
- Federico García Lorca
- Artur Lundkvist
- Stéphane Mallarmé
- Harry Martinson
- Henri Michaux
- Birger Sjöberg
- August Stramm
- Giorgos Seferis
- Philippe Soupault
- Jules Supervielle
- Edith Södergran
- Georg Trakl
- Paul Valéry

== Russian-language Modernist poets ==
- Anna Akhmatova
- Alexander Blok
- Vasilisk Gnedov
- Nikolay Gumilev
- Georgiy Ivanov
- Rurik Ivnev
- Velimir Khlebnikov
- Aleksei Kruchyonykh
- Mikhail Kuzmin
- Osip Mandelstam
- Anatoly Marienhof
- Vladimir Mayakovsky
- Vladimir Nabokov
- Igor Severyanin
- Sergei Yesenin

== See also ==
- Modernist poetry
- Modernism
- Modernist literature
- List of modernist writers
- List of poetry groups and movements

== Sources ==
- Willhardt, Mark; Parker, Alan Michael, eds. (2001). Who's Who in Twentieth Century World Poetry. Who's Who Series. London: Routledge. doi:10.4324/9780203991992. ISBN 0-415-16355-2.
