= Iza Duffus Hardy =

British writer

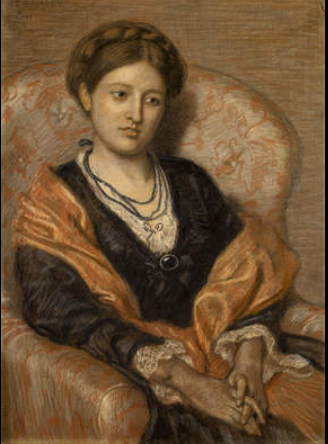
- Ford Madox Brown, "Portrait of Miss Iza Duffus Hardy" (1872)
- Born: 11 October 1850; Enfield
- Died: 30 August 1922 (aged 71); Paddington, London
- Occupations: Writer, novelist
- Parent(s): Thomas Duffus Hardy; Mary Anne Hardy

Iza Duffus Hardy (11 October 1850 – 30 August 1922) was a prolific English novelist and travel writer, associated with the pre-Raphaelite artistic community.

== Early life ==
Iza Duffus Hardy was born in Enfield, the daughter of archivist Sir Thomas Duffus Hardy (1804–1878) and author Mary Anne Hardy (née MacDowell; 1824–1891). She was "educated chiefly at home", by her parents. Thomas Hardy believed her to be a distant relation, referring to her as "my very remote consanguinean" in a personal notebook in 1886.

== Career ==
Hardy was a prolific novelist and short story writer. Books by Hardy include Not Easily Jealous (1872), Between Two Fires (1873), For the Old Love's Sake (1875), Glencairn (1877), Only a Love-Story (1877), A Broken Faith (1878), Friend and Lover (1880), Love, Honour, and Obey (1881), The Love that He Passed By (1884), Hearts or Diamonds? (1885), The Westhorpe Mystery (1886), The Girl He Did Not Marry (1887), Love In Idleness (1887), A New Othello (1890), A Woman's Loyalty (1893), In the Springtime of Love (1895), MacGilleroy's Millions (1900), The Lesser Evil (1901), Man, Woman, and Fate (1902), The Master of Madrono Hills (1904), A Trap of Fate (1906), and The Silent Watchers (1910). Her shorter works, comprising stories, sketches, and serialized versions of her novels, appeared in Tinsley's Magazine, London Society, Belgravia, The Gentleman's Magazine, and The Strand Magazine.

Hardy and her mother traveled to the United States several times, touring the South, the West, and Florida, and visiting with prominent Americans including Henry Wadsworth Longfellow and Oliver Wendell Holmes. She wrote about her travels in Between Two Oceans (1884) and Oranges and Alligators (1886).

Hardy was in the social orbit of the pre-Raphaelite artists. Ford Madox Brown made a large pastel portrait of Hardy in 1872.

== Personal life ==
Hardy lived in Maida Vale for much of her adult life. She received a government pension after her mother's death, in recognition of her father's career in the Public Record Office. She was skilled at needlework and other handcrafts. She was briefly engaged to American poet Joaquin Miller, during his time in London in 1873. She died in a Paddington nursing home in 1922, aged 71 years. Ford Madox Brown's 1872 portrait of Hardy is in the collection of Birmingham Museums. Two letters by Hardy to Lucy Madox Brown Rossetti are in the Sheila and Terry Meyers Collection of Swinburneiana at the College of William & Mary.
