= List of modernist writers =

Literary modernism has its origins in the late 19th and early 20th centuries, mainly in Europe and North America. Modernism is characterized by a self-conscious break with traditional styles of poetry and prose. Modernists experimented with literary form and expression, adhering to Ezra Pound's maxim to "Make it new". The modernist literary movement was driven by a conscious desire to overturn traditional modes of representation and express the new sensibilities of their time. It is debatable when the modernist literary movement began, though some have chosen 1910 as roughly marking the beginning and quote novelist Virginia Woolf, who declared that human nature underwent a fundamental change "on or about December 1910." But modernism was already stirring by 1899, with works such as Joseph Conrad's (1857–1924) Heart of Darkness, while Alfred Jarry's (1873–1907) absurdist play, Ubu Roi appeared even earlier, in 1896. Knut Hamsun's (1859–1952) Hunger (1890) is a groundbreaking modernist novel and Mysteries (1892) pioneers modernist stream of consciousness method. Even earlier precursor to stream of consciousness can be found in Dostoyevsky's Notes from Underground (1864).

When modernism ends is debatable. Though The Oxford Encyclopedia of British Literature sees Modernism ending by c.1939, with regard to British and American literature, "When (if) Modernism petered out and postmodernism began has been contested almost as hotly as when the transition from Victorianism to Modernism occurred". Clement Greenberg sees Modernism ending in the 1930s, with the exception of the visual and performing arts. In fact many literary modernists lived into the 1950s and 1960s, though generally speaking they were no longer producing major works. The term late modernism is also sometimes applied to modernist works published after 1930. Among modernists (or late modernists) still publishing after 1945 were Wallace Stevens, Gottfried Benn, T. S. Eliot, Anna Akhmatova, William Faulkner, Dorothy Richardson, John Cowper Powys, and Ezra Pound. Basil Bunting, born in 1900, published his most important modernist poem Briggflatts in 1965. In addition Hermann Broch's The Death of Virgil was published in 1945 and Thomas Mann's Doctor Faustus in 1947. Samuel Beckett, who died in 1989, has been described as a "later modernist". Beckett is a writer with roots in the expressionist tradition of modernism, who produced works from the 1930s until the 1980s, including Molloy (1951), En attendant Godot (1953), Happy Days (1961), Rockaby (1981). The poets Charles Olson (1910-1970) and J. H. Prynne (1936- ) are, amongst other writing in the second half of the 20th century, who have been described as late modernists.

List

The following is a list of significant modernist writers:

- Anna Akhmatova (1889–1966)
- Jorge Amado (1912–2001)
- Sherwood Anderson (1876-1941)
- Mário de Andrade (1893–1945)
- Oswald de Andrade (1890–1954)
- Gabriele d'Annunzio (1863–1938)
- Guillaume Apollinaire (1880–1918)
- W. H. Auden (1907–1973)
- Djuna Barnes (1892–1982)*
- Samuel Beckett (1906–1989)
- Andrei Bely (1880–1934)
- Gottfried Benn (1886–1956)
- Elizabeth Bishop (1911–1979)
- Alexander Blok (1880–1921)
- Jorge Luis Borges (1899–1986)
- Menno ter Braak (1902–40)
- Bertolt Brecht (1898–1956)
- André Breton (1896–1966)
- Hermann Broch (1886–1951)
- Basil Bunting (1900–1985)
- Ivan Cankar (1876–1918)
- Karel Čapek (1890–1938)
- Constantine P. Cavafy (1863–1933)
- Blaise Cendrars (1887–1961)
- Inger Christensen (1935-2009)
- Joseph Conrad (1857–1924)
- Hart Crane (1899–1932)
- E. E. Cummings (1894–1962)
- Rubén Darío (1867–1916)
- Alfred Döblin (1878–1957)
- Leonid Dobychin (1894–1936 [?])
- John Dos Passos (1896-1970)
- Carlos Drummond de Andrade (1902–1987)
- Gunnar Ekelöf (1907–1968)
- T. S. Eliot (1888–1965)
- Ralph W. Ellison (1914–1994)
- Forough Farrokhzad (1934-1967)
- William Faulkner (1897–1962)
- F. Scott Fitzgerald (1896–1940)
- E. M. Forster (1879–1971)
- Robert Frost (1874–1963)
- Carlo Emilio Gadda (1893–1973)
- André Gide (1869–1951)
- Witold Gombrowicz (1904-1969)
- Maxim Gorky (1868–1936) (later works)
- H.D. (Hilda Doolittle) (1886–1961)
- Knut Hamsun (1859–1952)
- Jaroslav Hašek (1883–1923)
- Sadegh Hedayat (1903-1951)
- Ernest Hemingway (1899–1961)
- Hermann Hesse (1877-1962)
- Hugo von Hofmannsthal (1874–1929)
- Max Jacob (1876–1944)
- David Jones (1895–1974)
- James Joyce (1882–1941)
- Franz Kafka (1883–1924)
- Georg Kaiser (1878–1945)
- Daniil Kharms (1905–1942)
- Miroslav Krleža (1893–1981)
- Tin Ujević (1891–1955)
- Antun Gustav Matoš (1873–1914)
- D. H. Lawrence (1885–1930)
- Sinclair Lewis (1885-1951)
- Wyndham Lewis (1882–1957)
- Clarice Lispector (1920–1977)
- Federico García Lorca (1898–1936)
- Robert Lowell (1917–1977)
- Mina Loy (1882–1966)
- Leopoldo Lugones (1874–1938)
- Artur Lundkvist (1906–1991)
- Hugh MacDiarmid (1892–1978)
- Joaquim Maria Machado de Assis (1839–1908)
- Antonio Machado Ruiz (1875–1939)
- Osip Mandelstam (1891–1938)
- Thomas Mann (1875–1955)
- Katherine Mansfield (1888–1923)
- Harry Martinson (1904–1978)
- Eugenio Montale (1896–1981)
- Marianne Moore (1887–1972)
- Robert Musil (1880–1942)
- Vladimir Nabokov (1899–1977)
- Pablo Neruda (1904–1973)
- Yone Noguchi (1875–1947)
- Eugene O'Neill (1888–1953)
- George Orwell (1903–1950)
- Aldo Palazzeschi (1885–1974)
- Dorothy Parker (1893-1967)
- Boris Pasternak (1890–1960)
- Ramón Pérez de Ayala (1880–1962)
- Fernando Pessoa (1888–1935)
- Luigi Pirandello (1867–1936)
- Andrei Platonov (1899–1951)
- Katherine Anne Porter (1890–1980)
- Ezra Pound (1885–1972)
- Anthony Powell (1905-2000)
- John Cowper Powys (1872–1963)
- Marcel Proust (1871–1922)
- Aleksey Remizov (1877–1957)
- Jean Rhys (1890-1979)
- Dorothy Richardson (1873–1957)
- Klaus Rifbjerg (1931–2015)
- Rainer Maria Rilke (1875–1926)
- Mário de Sá-Carneiro (1890–1916)
- Peter Seeberg (1925–1999)
- Victor Serge (1890–1947)
- R.C. Sherriff (1896-1975)
- Gertrude Stein (1874–1946)
- John Steinbeck (1902–1968)
- Wallace Stevens (1875–1955)
- Italo Svevo (1861–1928)
- Edith Södergran (1892–1923)
- Villy Sørensen (1929-2001)
- Dylan Thomas (1914–1953)
- Ernst Toller (1893–1939)
- Federigo Tozzi (1883–1920)
- Georg Trakl (1887–1914)
- Konstantin Vaginov (1899–1934)
- Paul Valéry (1871–1945)
- Alexander Vvedensky (1904–1941)
- Robert Walser (1878–1956)
- Frank Wedekind (1864–1918)
- Nathanael West (1903–1940)
- William Carlos Williams (1883–1963)
- Virginia Woolf (1882–1941)
- Lu Xun (1881–1936)
- W. B. Yeats (1865–1939)
- Yevgeny Zamyatin (1884–1937)
- Flann O'Brien (1911–1966)

== See also ==
- List of modernist women writers
- List of modernist poets
- Modernist literature
- English literature
- American literature
- European literature
- French literature
- German literature
