= Mary Eliza Kennard =

English novelist and writer of non-fiction

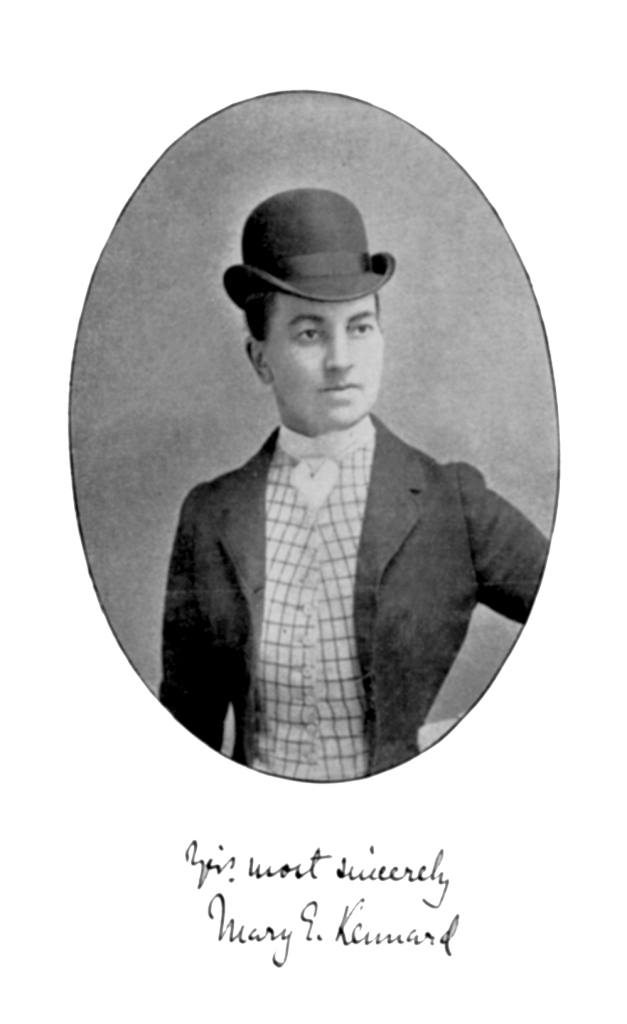
Mrs Edward Kennard (published in 1893)

Mary Eliza Kennard (née Laing; 1850 – 3 March 1936) was a British novelist and writer of non-fiction. Most of her work was published under the name of Mrs Edward Kennard.

Kennard specialised in stories of the English country house world of hunting, shooting, and fishing, and in her heyday was dubbed "the Diana of fiction", in honour of Diana, the Roman goddess of hunting.

== Life ==
Mary Eliza was born in Sydenham in 1850, the eldest daughter of Scottish parents Samuel Laing from Edinburgh and Mary Dickson (Cowan) Laing (1819–1902) from Orkney. Her father was chairman of the Brighton Railway as well as a noted author.

Mary has been wrongly recorded as the daughter of Charles Wilson Faber. and there is a danger of the error becoming established, details of her birth and baptism are given. The error probably arose because in that period and earlier a "sister-in-law" was often referred to as simply a "sister", and Mary Eliza's sister Theresa Uzielli (1857–1943) was married to Walter Vavasour Faber (1857–1928), one of the sons of Charles Wilson Faber (1813–1878). Mary Eliza's parentage and early life are described in a brief contemporary biography, which quotes her as saying "I fancy that any small love of literature which I may possess is hereditary, since my father, who is now chairman of the Brighton Railway, has written several important books, notably Modern Science and Modern Thought, Problems of the Future etc., whilst my grandfather, Mr S. Laing, was also a well-known author in his day."

Laing's sister, artist Florence Laing (1853–1952), was married to the artist Edward Sherard Kennedy (1837–1900) and later to Joannes Gennadius, Greek ambassador to the UK. Florence, along with Joannes, established the Gennadius Library at the American School of Classical Studies at Athens (ASCSA).

On 19 April 1870, at Saint Nicholas church, Brighton, Mary Eliza Laing married Edward Kennard (1842–1910), himself once a journalist, who became a landed gentleman by buying the Barn Estate on the borders of Leicestershire and Northamptonshire from the 18th Earl of Shrewsbury. This property was centred on a country house called The Barn at Little Bowden, one mile from the town of Market Harborough. Kennard had two sons in the 1870s, Lionel (b. 1872) and Malcolm (1874-1934), and her first stories were written for them and were published in a volume called Twilight Tales. She took up writing in earnest to occupy her mind after her sons went away to school.

Kennard's novels, beginning with The Right Sort (1883), are mostly set in her own rural world of hunting, shooting, and fishing. Landing a Prize (1891) was about salmon-fishing, and was the fruit of several summers spent salmon-fishing in Norway. With Bram Stoker, Arthur Conan Doyle, and others, she was one of the authors of the collaborative novel The Fate of Fenella (1892).

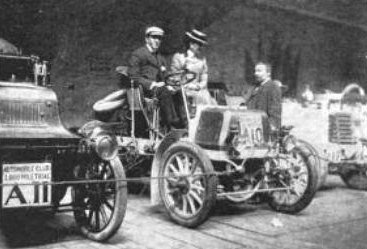
In the Thousand Miles Trial of the Automobile Club

Kennard and her husband were both keen motorists and each owned an automobile. She bought a Napier eight horsepower two-cylinder, which she allowed to be entered for a 1,000-mile race by S F Edge with herself as passenger. Kennard wrote kindly of her husband's choice of the Napier, but she preferred herself to drive a De Dion voiturette. Her driving was not without incident, and she turned her car over on the tramlines in Nottingham. In 1903, she published a novel called The Motor Maniac, based around the subject of automobiles. The Spectator gave it a poor review, suggesting that people who did not own an automobile would find the details of "belts, speeds, makes of car, &c... exasperating". However, The Times later called Kennard "a very widely read and prolific author of the mid-eighties" who wrote "rattling good tales".

Widowed in 1910, in 1912 Kennard was living at Leamington. By the time of her death in 1936 in Leamington she was forgotten as a writer. In its obituary, The Times said of her, "Large sums were earned by her publications; then came complete oblivion, which was viewed by the formerly popular favourite with serene detachment." The same obituary recorded that although she was both blind and crippled by the end of her life, she suffered these problems with "unfailing stoicism". In her old age she took an interest in BBC radio and in the lives of her grandchildren.

== Selected books ==
- The Right Sort (1883)
- Killed in the Open (1886)
- The Girl in the Brown Habit (1887)
- Glorious Gallop (1888)
- A Real Good Thing (1888)
- The Mystery of a Woman's Heart (1890)
- A Homburg Beauty (1890)
- Matron or Maid (F. V. White, 1891)
- Straight as a Die (Chapman & Hall, 1891)
- Landing a Prize (1891)
- That Pretty Little Horse-Breaker (1891)
- Our Friends in the Hunting Field (1892)
- 'The Scars Remained', Chapter 13 of The Fate of Fenella (1892)
- A Hunting Girl (1894)
- Wedded to Sport (1894)
- Guidebook for Lady Cyclists (1896)
- The Sorrows of a Golfer's Wife (F. V. White, 1896)
- At the Tail of the Hounds (1897)
- A Riverside Romance (1898)
- The Golf Lunatic and His Cycling Wife (Brentano's, 1902)
- The Motor Maniac (Hutchinson's, 1903)
