= Margaret Wolfe Hungerford =

Irish novelist

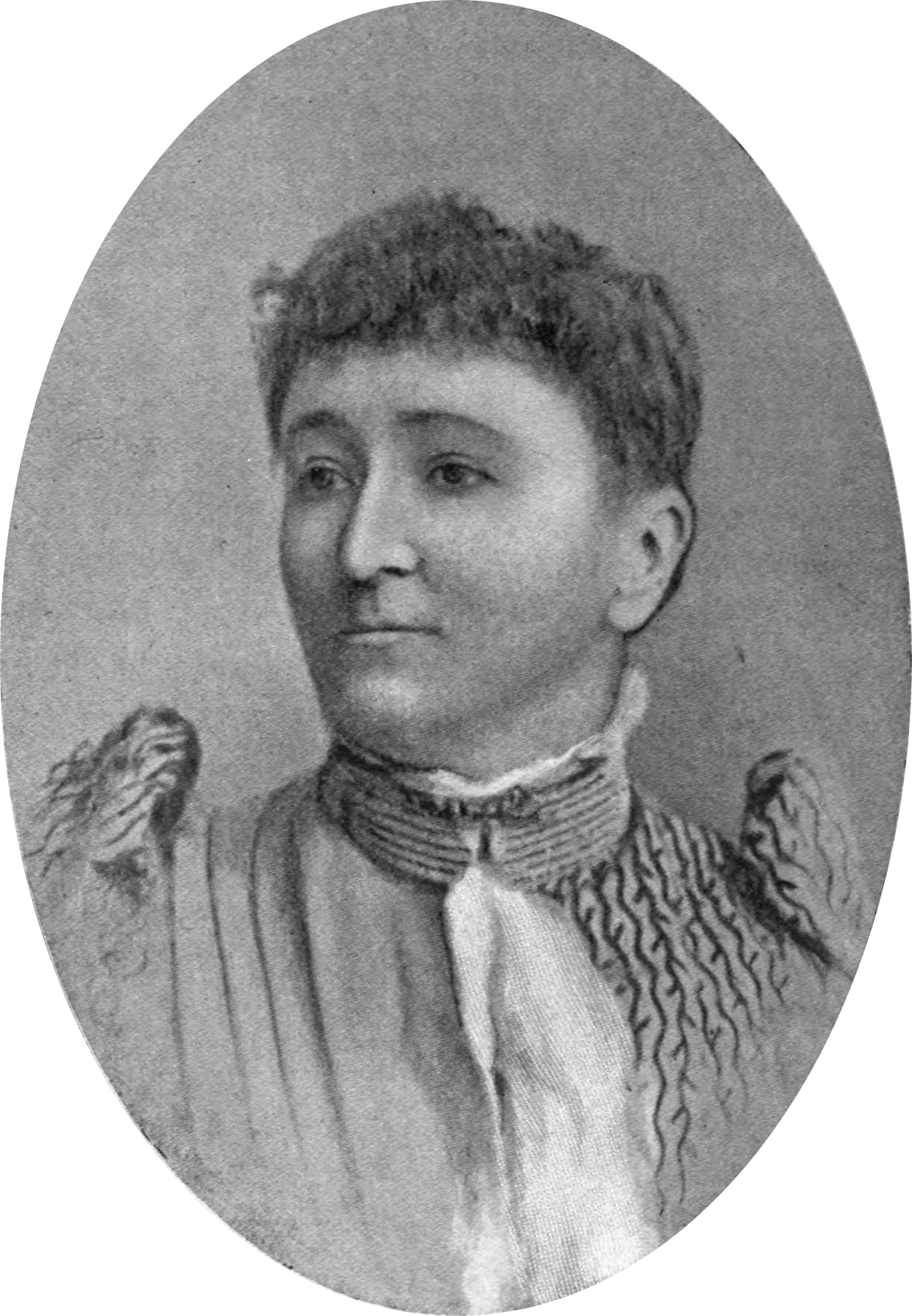
- Born: Margaret Hamilton; 27 April 1855; Rosscarbery, County Cork, Ireland
- Died: 24 January 1897 (aged 41); Bandon, County Cork, Ireland
- Education: Portarlington College
- Occupation: Novelist
- Spouses: Edward Argles; Thomas Henry Hungerford
- Children: Two sons, four daughters
- Writing career
- Pen name: The Duchess
- Language: English
- Period: 1877–1897
- Notable work: Molly Bawn

Margaret Wolfe Hungerford, née Hamilton, (27 April 1855 – 24 January 1897), was an Irish novelist whose light romantic fiction was popular throughout the English-speaking world in the late 19th century. Many of her works were published under the pseudonym "The Duchess".

== Biography ==
She was born in County Cork, Ireland on 27 April 1855. Her father was Canon Fitzjohn Stannus Hamilton, rector and vicar-choral at St. Faughnan's cathedral in Rosscarbery. As a child she enjoyed creating stories, and she won prizes for her writing at school. She was educated at Portarlington College.

In 1872, she married Edward Argles, a Dublin solicitor, who died less than six years later and they had three daughters. To support the fatherless family, she wrote her first novel, Phyllis. Soon after its favourable reception, she wrote Molly Bawn, which became her best-known book.

She married Thomas Henry Hungerford, of Cahirmore, in 1882. They had two sons and a daughter. They resided at St. Brenda's, Bandon, County Cork. By contemporary accounts, Margaret enjoyed country life and was an avid gardener. She rarely travelled far from home. She was one of the few women in Victorian times who was both a prolific author and mother of a sizeable family.

She died at Bandon of typhoid fever on 24 January 1897.

== Writing ==
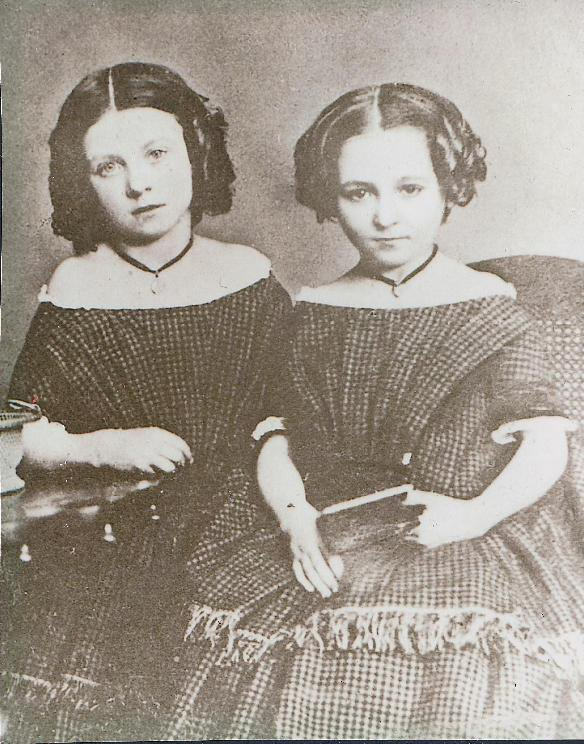
The writer as a girl (right), with her sister.

She approached her writing methodically, setting aside three hours every morning for it. The room where she did her writing had neatly organised manuscripts at her desk, surrounded by many reference works, novels, and other books.

Her books were first published anonymously, and later as by "Mrs. Hungerford". In the United States, her books were mostly published under the pen name "The Duchess". Some of her early books were published by William Tinsley, a major publisher at the time.

Often writing on commission, she wrote many novels, short stories, and newspaper articles. Her books continued selling as fast as she could write them.

Her plots follow the usual conventions of romantic novels of the day. They contain delicate love scenes that were never offensive to the ideals of Victorian morals. Her works are characterised as entertaining and charming, though usually not of great depth. She tends to have little in the way of character development, tending more towards flirtatious dialogue. She was adept at capturing the tone of her contemporary fashionable society, and sometimes used Irish settings.

== Molly Bawn ==
Hungerford's best-known novel is Molly Bawn (1878), the story of a frivolous, petulant Irish girl. She is a flirt who arouses her lover's jealousy and naively ignores social conventions. Mrs. Hungerford and this book are mentioned in chapter 18 of James Joyce's Ulysses:

...Molly bawn she gave me by Mrs Hungerford on account of the name I don't like books with a Molly in them like that one he brought me about the one from Flanders...

Molly Bawn contains Hungerford's most famous idiom: "Beauty is in the eye of the beholder."

== Works ==
- Phyllis: a Novel, 1877
- Molly Bawn, 1878
- Airy Fairy Lilian, 1879
- Beauty's Daughters, 1880
- Mrs. Geoffrey, 1881
- Faith and Unfaith, 1881
- Mrs. Geoffrey, 1881
- Portia, or By Passions Rocked, 1882
- Loys, Lord Beresford, and Other Tales, 1883
- Moonshine and Marguerites, 1883
- Rossmoyne, 1883
- Doris, 1884
- The Witching Hour, and Other Stories, 1884 (U.S.)
- Fortune's Wheel, and Other Stories, 1884
- A Week in Killarney, 1884 - reissued as Her Week's Amusement, 1886
- O Tender Dolores, 1885
- Mildred Trevanion, 1885
- A Maiden All Forlorn, and Other Stories, 1885
- In Durance Vile, and Other Stories, 1885
- Dick's Sweetheart, 1885 (U.S.)
- Green Pastures and Grey Grief, 1885
- Lady Branksmere, 1886
- A Mental Struggle, 1886
- The Haunted Chamber, 1886 (U.S.)
- Lady Valworth's Diamonds, 1886
- Her Week's Amusement, 1886
- A Modern Circe, 1887
- The Duchess, 1887
- That Last Rehearsal, 1887
- Undercurrents, 1888
- Marvel, 1888
- The Honourable Mrs. Vereker, 1888
- A Life's Remorse, 1889
- A Troublesome Girl, 1889
- A Born Coquette, 1890
- April's Lady, 1890
- A Little Rebel, 1890
- Her Last Throw, 1890
- A Little Irish Girl, and Other Stories, 1891
- The O'Connors of Ballinahinch, 1892
- A Conquering Heroine, 1892
- Nor Wife Nor Maid, 1892
- Lady Patty, 1892
- Nora Creina, 1892
- A Mad Prank, 1893
- The Red House Mystery, 1893
- Lady Verner's Flight, 1893
- An Unsatisfactory Lover, 1894
- Peter's Wife, 1894
- The Hoyden, 1894
- The Three Graces, 1895
- A Tug of War, 1895
- The Professor's Experiment, 1895
- Molly Darling and Other Stories, 1895
- A Lonely Girl, 1896 - (American title: A Lonely Maid)
- A Point of Conscience, 1896
- An Anxious Moment, 1897 (Stories)
- Lovice, 1897 (posthumous)
- The Coming of Chloe, 1897 (posthumous)
