= Pickwick (film) =

1969 television film

Opening title

Pickwick is a British television musical made by the BBC in 1969 and based on the 1963 stage musical Pickwick, which in turn was based on the 1837 novel The Pickwick Papers written by Charles Dickens. It stars Harry Secombe as Samuel Pickwick and Roy Castle as Sam Weller.

This television production was based on the stage musical Pickwick which had been a commercial success. It was adapted for the screen by James Gilbert and Jimmy Grafton. The musical had been produced by Bernard Delfont and had premiered in the West End in 1963, again with Harry Secombe in the lead role and with choreography by Gillian Lynne.

Running at 90 minutes and made in colour, the TV musical again had lyrics by Leslie Bricusse and a score by Cyril Ornadel. The book was by Wolf Mankowitz and it was directed by Terry Hughes. The programme was first transmitted on 11 June 1969 on BBC2 and again on 26 December 1969 on BBC1. One of the better known songs from the score is "If I Ruled the World".

The cast of this production differed somewhat from that of the stage musical.

== Plot ==
Set in England in 1828, the story centres on wealthy Samuel Pickwick and his valet Sam Weller, who are in a debtors' prison where they recall the misadventures that led to their imprisonment.

On the previous Christmas Eve, Pickwick introduced his friend Wardle, Wardle's daughters, Emily and Isabella, and their Aunt Rachael to Nathaniel Winkle, Augustus Snodgrass, and Tracy Tupman, three members of the Pickwick Club. They were soon joined by Alfred Jingle, who tricked Tupman into paying for his ticket to a ball that evening. Upon learning Rachael is an heiress, Jingle set out to win her hand and eventually succeeded.

Pickwick engages Sam Weller as his valet and, through a series of misunderstandings, he inadvertently leads his landlady, Mrs. Bardell, to believe he has proposed marriage to her. Pickwick is charged with breach of promise and hauled into court, where he is found guilty as charged and sentenced to prison when he stubbornly refuses to pay her compensation.

== Cast list ==
- Harry Secombe ... Mr. Pickwick
- Roy Castle ... Sam Weller
- Hattie Jacques ... Mrs. Bardell
- Aubrey Woods ... Alfred Jingle
- Bill Fraser ... Serjeant Buzzfuzz
- Julian Orchard ... Augustus Snodgrass
- Robert Dorning ... Tracy Tupman
- Ian Trigger ... Nathaniel Winkle
- Sheila White ... Mary
- Michael Logan ... Wardle
- Joyce Grant ... Rachel
- Julia Sutton ... Isabella
- Cheryl Kennedy ... Emily
- Robert Yetzes ... The Fat Boy
- Christopher Reynalds ... Bardell Jr.
- Gertan Klauber ... Landlord
- Erik Chitty ... Judge
- Michael Darbyshire ... Dodson
- Tony Sympson ... Fogg
- Ian Gray ... Serjeant Snubbin
- Michael Balfour ... Roker

== Archive status ==
Although the play still exists in full colour as its original videotape master, it has not been released onto VHS, DVD or Blu-ray, nor has it been made available on any streaming sites, including BBC iPlayer. A single clip, the opening titles, has been made available on the Ravensbourne University London website. The movie is now on YouTube under Pickwick 1969.

=== Trivia ===
Shelia White and Harry Secombe both appeared in the Academy Award winning Oliver! a movie based on the Charles Dickens story Oliver Twist. Shelia portrayed Nancy's sister Bet while Harry portrayed the pompous Mr Bumble.
