= Pickwick (musical) =

- Poster for the Broadway production
- Music: Cyril Ornadel
- Lyrics: Leslie Bricusse
- Book: Wolf Mankowitz
- Basis: The Pickwick Papers by Charles Dickens
- Productions: 1963 West End; 1965 Broadway

Pickwick is a musical with a book by Wolf Mankowitz, music by Cyril Ornadel, and lyrics by Leslie Bricusse. Based on the 1837 novel The Pickwick Papers by Charles Dickens, it is set in and around London and Rochester in 1828.

Produced by Bernard Delfont, Pickwick premiered in the West End in 1963, with Harry Secombe in the lead role and choreography by Gillian Lynne.

== Plot ==
Set in England in 1828, the story centres on wealthy Samuel Pickwick and his valet Sam Weller, who are in a debtors' prison where they recall the misadventures that led to their imprisonment.

On the previous Christmas Eve, Pickwick introduced his friend Wardle, Wardle's daughters, Emily and Isabella, and their Aunt Rachael to Nathaniel Winkle, Augustus Snodgrass, and Tracy Tupman, three members of the Pickwick Club. They were soon joined by Alfred Jingle, who tricked Tupman into paying for his ticket to a ball that evening. Upon learning Rachael is an heiress, Jingle set out to win her hand and eventually succeeded.

Pickwick engages Sam Weller as his valet and, through a series of misunderstandings, he inadvertently leads his landlady, Mrs. Bardell, to believe he has proposed marriage to her. Pickwick is charged with breach of promise and hauled into court, where he is found guilty as charged and sentenced to prison when he stubbornly refuses to pay her compensation.

== Productions ==
The musical opened on 3 June 1963 at the Palace Theatre, Manchester prior to the West End premiere on 4 July 1963 at the Saville Theatre and closed on 27 February 1965 following 694 performances. Peter Coe directed, choreography was by Leo Kharibian, scenic design was by Sean Kenny and costumes were by Roger K. Furse. The cast in Manchester and London featured Harry Secombe as Pickwick, Jessie Evans as Mrs. Bardell and Teddy Green as Sam Weller. The Pickwickians Tracy Tupman, Augustus Snodgrass and Nathaniel Winkle were played by Gerald James, Julian Orchard and Oscar Quitak respectively. Anton Rodgers was Mr. Jingle, and Robin Wentworth and Norman Rossington played Tony Weller. Rachel, Isabella and Emily were played by Hilda Braid, Vivienne St. George and Jane Sconce respectively with Sam Weller's 'Girl' Mary performed superbly by Dilys Watling. The remaining cast and Company were equally impressive.

The Broadway premiere, produced by David Merrick, was at the 46th Street Theatre on 4 October 1965. It closed on 18 November after 56 performances. The New York production was directed by Peter Coe, choreographed by Gillian Lynne, and featured Harry Secombe as Pickwick, Charlotte Rae as Mrs. Bardell, Roy Castle as Sam Weller, Nancy Haywood as Isabella, Michael Logan as Mr. Wardle, and Peter Bull as Sgt. Buzfuz.

Davy Jones of The Monkees says he got his big break after appearing as Sam Weller in Pickwick in Hollywood with Harry Secombe, where writers Paul Mazursky and Larry Tucker saw him.

The best-known song from the score is "If I Ruled the World", which not only became the signature tune for Harry Secombe, but was covered by Tony Bennett, Sammy Davis Jr. and many other vocalists.

In 1969 the BBC made Pickwick, a TV movie of the musical which again starred Harry Secombe as Mr. Pickwick, and with Roy Castle as Sam Weller.

In 1993, the Chichester Festival Theatre, in collaboration with the Birmingham Alexandra Theatre, revived the musical for the summer season, followed by a short tour which included Sadler's Wells Theatre in London, the Birmingham Alexandra, and then on to the New Victoria Theatre in Woking, The Lyceum Theatre in Sheffield and the Theatre Royal in Norwich. The tour concluded at the Theatre Royal, Norwich, in April 1994. This production was directed by Patrick Garland, choreographed by Gillian Lynne and again starred Harry Secombe as Pickwick, with Ruth Madoc playing Mrs. Bardell, David Cardy as Sam Weller, and Roy Castle as Tony Weller, one of his last performances. An especially arranged version of some of the songs was performed at the 1993 Royal Variety performance.

== Songs ==
=== London production ===
Act 1

- "Business is Booming" - Hot Toddy Seller, Cold Drinks Seller and Turnkey
- "Debtors Lament" - Chorus
- "Talk" - Sam Weller and Chorus
- "That's What I'd Like for Christmas" - Pickwick and Company
- "The Pickwickians" - Pickwick, Augustus Snodgrass, Tracy Tupman and Nathaniel Winkle
- "Bit of a Character" - Mr. Jingle, Augustus Snodgrass, Nathaniel Winkle and Tracy Tupman
- "Quadrille" - The Company
- "There's Something About You" - Mr. Jingle, Rachel and Company
- "Learn a Little Something" - Sam Weller and Mary
- "You Never Met a Feller Like Me" - Pickwick and Sam Weller
- "Look into Your Heart" - Pickwick and Mrs. Bardell
- "Winter Waltz" - Chorus

Act 2

- "A Hell of an Election" - Chorus
- "Very" - Mr. Jingle, Pickwick and Mr. Wardle
- "If I Ruled the World" - Pickwick and Company
- "The Trouble with Women" - Tony Weller and Sam Weller
- "That's the Law" - Dodson and Fogg, Pickwick, Sam, The Pickwickians, The Clerks
- "British Justice" - Pickwick and The Company
- "Do as you Would be Done By" - Jingle, Pickwick, Sam, Mrs. Bardell and Chorus
- "Good Old Pickwick" - The Company
- "If I Ruled the World (Reprise)" - Pickwick and Company

=== Broadway production ===
Act 1

- "I Like the Company of Men" - Pickwick, Augustus Snodgrass, Tracy Tupman and Nathaniel Winkle
- "That's What I'd Like for Christmas" - Pickwick and Company
- "The Pickwickians" - Pickwick, Augustus Snodgrass, Tracy Tupman and Nathaniel Winkle
- "Bit of a Character" - Mr. Jingle, Augustus Snodgrass, Nathaniel Winkle and Tracy Tupman
- "There's Something About You" - Mr. Jingle, Rachel and Company
- "A Gentleman's Gentleman" - Sam Weller and Mary
- "You Never Met a Feller Like Me" - Pickwick and Sam Weller
- "I'll Never Be Lonely Again" - Pickwick and Mrs. Bardell

Act 2

- "Fizkin and Pickwick" - Company
- "Very" - Mr. Jingle, Pickwick and Mr. Wardle
- "If I Ruled the World" - Pickwick and Company
- "I'll Never Be Lonely Again (Reprise)" - The Pickwickians
- "Talk" - Sam Weller and Company
- "That's the Law" - Pickwick, Dodson, Fogg and Company
- "Damages" -Pickwick and Mrs. Bardell
- "If I Ruled the World (Reprise)" - Pickwick and Company
