= Samuel Pickwick =

Fictional character in The Pickwick Papers

- The Pickwick Papers character
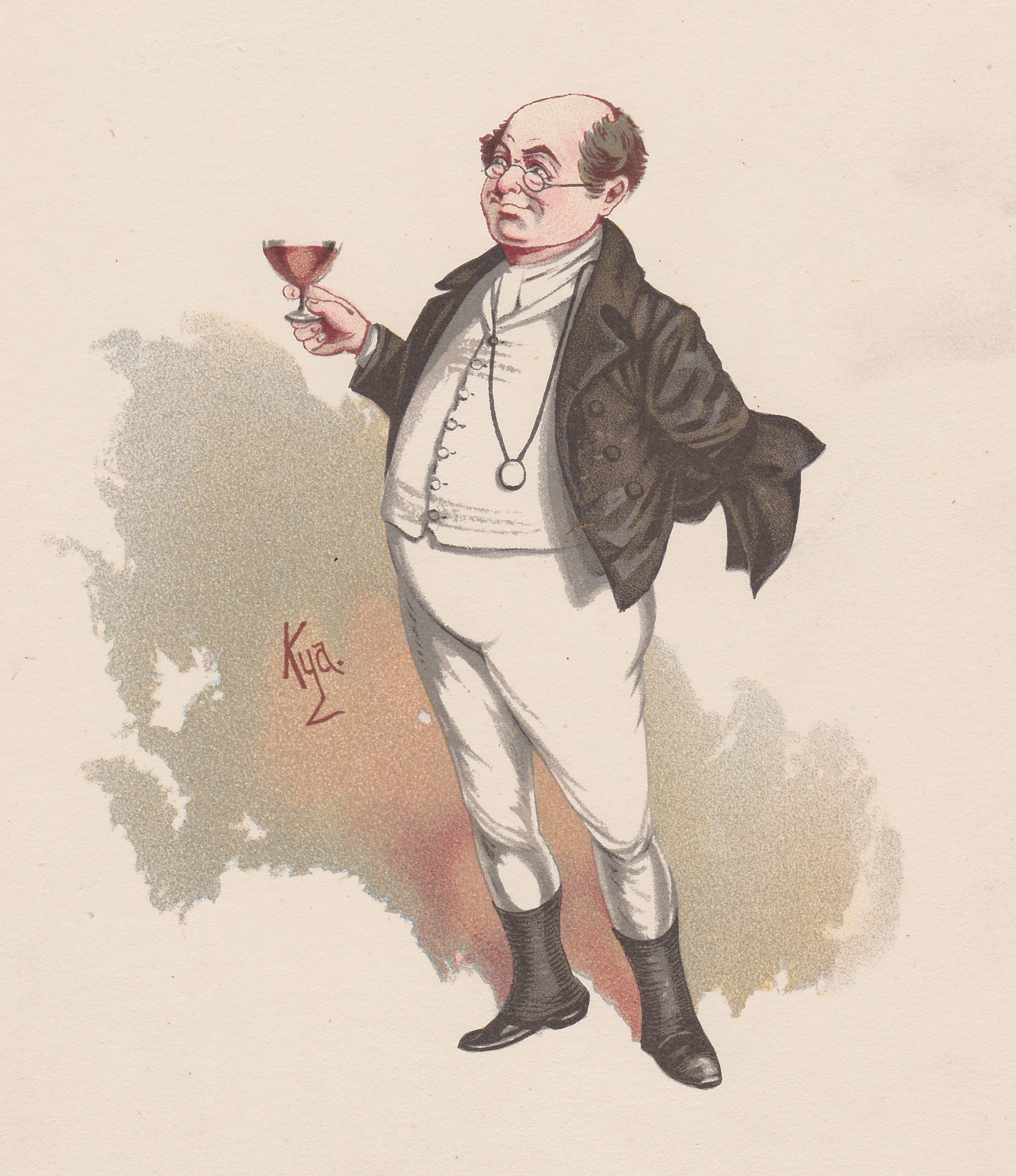
- Mr.Pickwick illustrated by 'Kyd' (1889)
- Created by: Charles Dickens

In-universe information
- Gender: Male
- Occupation: Chairman of the Pickwick Club
- Nationality: English

Samuel Pickwick is a fictional character and the main protagonist in The Pickwick Papers (1836-37), the first novel by author Charles Dickens. One of the author's most famous and loved creations, Pickwick is a retired successful businessman and is the founder and chairman of the Pickwick Club, a club formed to explore places remote from London and investigate the quaint and curious phenomena of life found there.

== Character ==
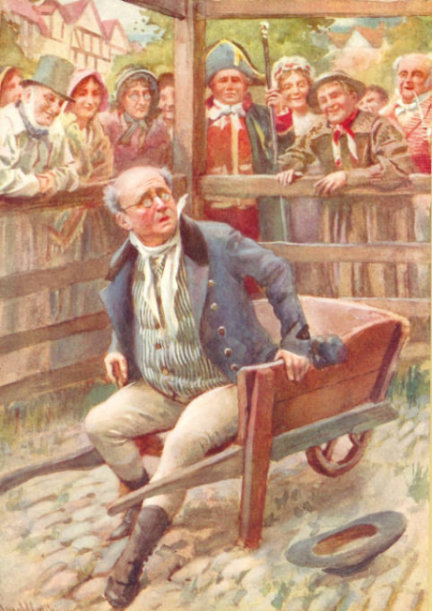
Mr Pickwick as illustrated by Harold Copping in 1924

Mr Pickwick is believed to have been named after the British businessman Eleazer Pickwick (c.1749–1837). Although he is the main character in The Pickwick Papers, Samuel Pickwick is mostly a passive and innocent figure in the story around whom the other more active characters operate. Having an almost childlike simplicity, Pickwick is loyal and protective toward his friends but is often hoodwinked by conmen and poseurs; he can be quick to anger when confronted by the actions of tricksters such as Alfred Jingle. He is always gallant towards women, young and old, but can also be indecisive in his dealings with them. Dickens develops Pickwick's character as the novel evolved from the original concept of the Pickwick Club, a series of comic "cockney sporting plates" by illustrator Robert Seymour. The subsequent suicide of Seymour early in the publication afforded Dickens the opportunity to change both the course of the novel and the character of Pickwick.

In Chapter One of The Pickwick Papers Dickens describes Pickwick:

A casual observer might possibly have remarked nothing extraordinary in the bald head, and circular spectacles, which were intently turned towards his (the secretary’s) face, during the reading of the above resolutions: to those who knew that the gigantic brain of Pickwick was working beneath that forehead, and that the beaming eyes of Pickwick were twinkling behind those glasses, the sight was indeed an interesting one. There sat the man who had traced to their source the mighty ponds of Hampstead, and agitated the scientific world with his Theory of Tittlebats ... The eloquent Pickwick, with one hand gracefully concealed behind his coat tails, and the other waving in air to assist his glowing declamation; his elevated position revealing those tights and gaiters, which, had they clothed an ordinary man, might have passed without observation, but which, when Pickwick clothed them—if we may use the expression—inspired involuntary awe and respect.

== The Pickwick Club ==
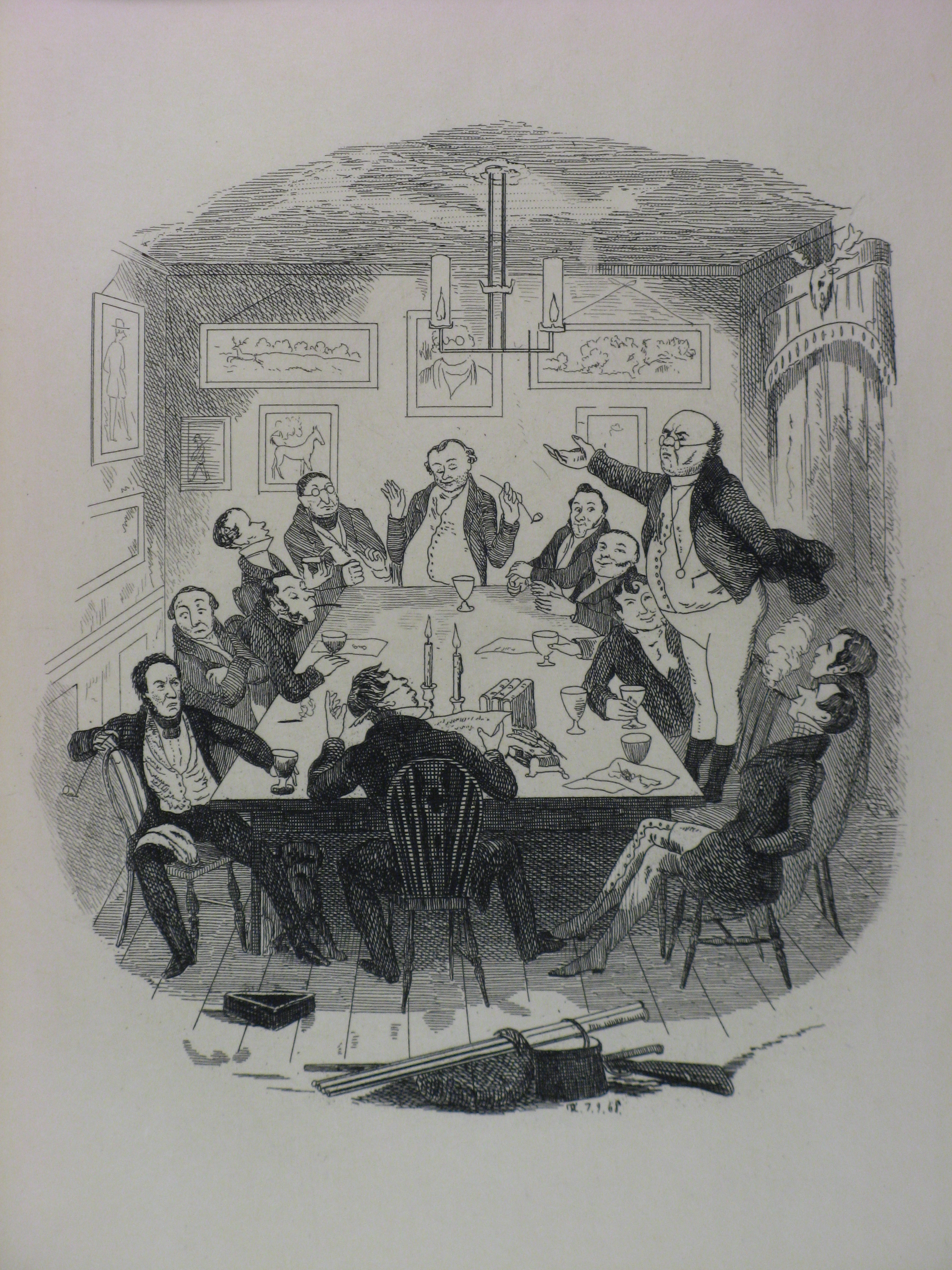
Robert Seymour illustration depicting Pickwick addressing the Pickwick Club (1836)

To extend his researches into the quaint and curious phenomena of life, Pickwick creates the Pickwick Club and suggests that he and three other "Pickwickians" (Mr Nathaniel Winkle, Mr Augustus Snodgrass and Mr Tracy Tupman) should make journeys to places remote from London and report on their findings to the other members of the club.

Pickwick careens from one comic disaster to another in pursuit of adventure or honour attended by the other members of the Pickwick Club. Pickwick becomes involved in several sub-plots in the novel, including thwarting Jingle's various money-making matrimonial schemes, and assisting his friend Winkle in eloping with Arabella Allen.

Pickwick encounters troubles during his adventures because, as one of nature's innocents, he is unaware of the presence of deception and tricksters such as Jingle in the real world. By the end of the novel he has received an education in morality and is filled with goodness and Christian charity towards his fellow man - and woman. Always on hand to save the day is his able manservant Sam Weller; the relationship between the idealistic and unworldly Pickwick and the astute cockney Weller has been likened to that between Don Quixote and Sancho Panza. By the end of the novel Pickwick looks upon Sam Weller almost as a son, a feeling which is reciprocated by Sam.

== Bardell v. Pickwick ==
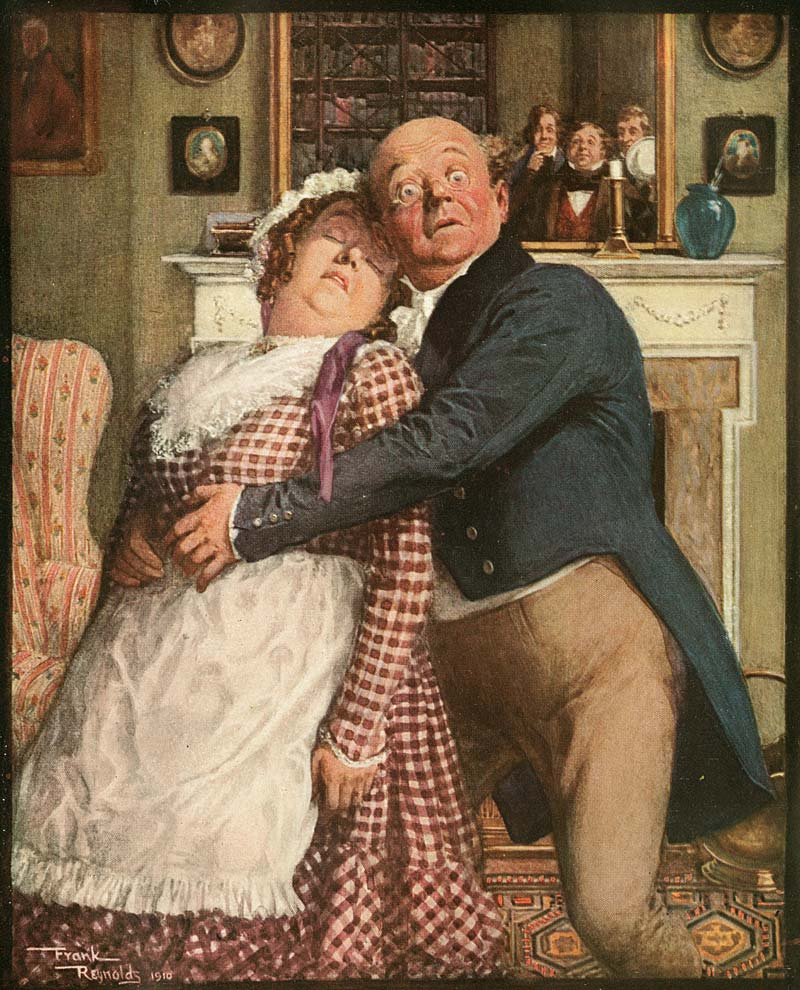
Mrs Bardell faints into the arms of Mr Pickwick - illustration by Frank Reynolds (1910)

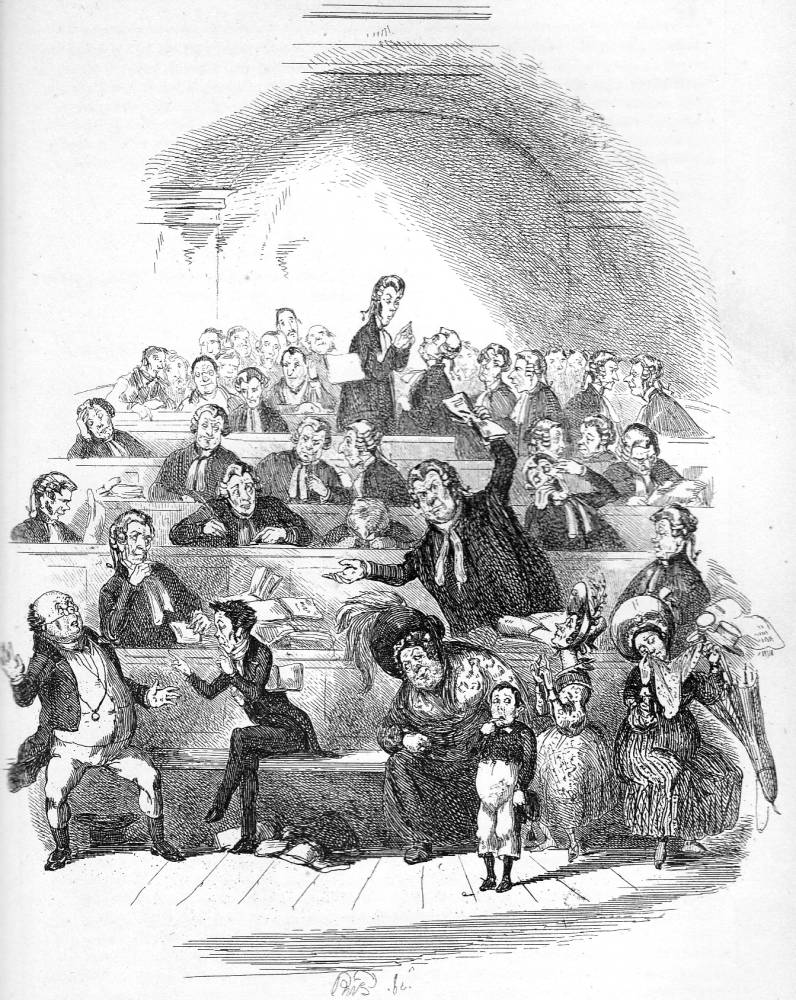
The Trial of Bardell v. Pickwick - illustration by Hablot Knight Browne (1867)

Another sub-plot in the novel is the romantic misunderstanding between Pickwick and his landlady Mrs Bardell that results in one of the most famous legal cases in English literature, the breach of promise to marry suit Bardell v. Pickwick. When Pickwick discusses with Mrs Bardell his idea of taking a servant (Sam Weller), expressing the view that three may eat as cheaply as two, she mistakes this for a marriage proposal and accepting his 'offer', much to his dismay, faints into his arms, possibly deliberately, as his three friends Winkle, Snodgrass and Tupman walk through the door and witness the scene:

When Pickwick refuses to marry her Mrs Bardell is persuaded by the unscrupulous lawyers Dodson and Fogg into bringing a legal suit against Pickwick. During the trial at the Guildhall Sittings in London before Mr. Justice Stareleigh, Mr. Serjeant Buzfuz prosecutes Pickwick and bullies the witnesses into giving incriminating testimony, leading to Pickwick being falsely convicted. The height of Pickwick's moral and spiritual development occurs at the Fleet Prison where he is imprisoned for refusing to pay Mrs Bardell's damages and costs. Here Pickwick encounters his nemesis Alfred Jingle as a fellow resident. Moved with compassion, Pickwick forgives him and charitably bails him out and later arranges for Jingle and his servant Job Trotter to pursue their fortune in the West Indies.

When Mrs. Bardell herself is sent to the Fleet Prison Pickwick learns that the only way he can relieve her suffering is by paying her costs in the action against himself, thus at the same time releasing himself from the prison.

== Media portrayals ==
=== Portrayals in adaptations ===
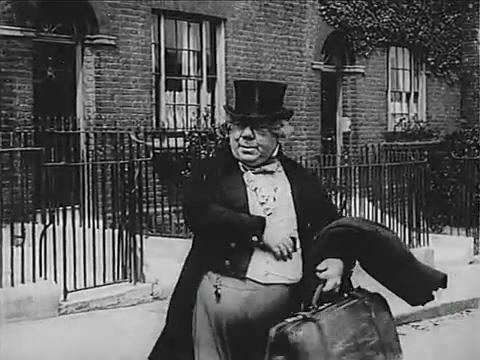
John Bunny as Mr Pickwick in The Pickwick Papers (1913)

In film, television and on stage Mr Pickwick has been portrayed by:

- A. Younge in Samuel Weller, or, The Pickwickians (1837)
- John Pritt Harley in Mr. Pickwick at the St James's Theatre in London (1837).
- Arthur Cecil in Pickwick (1889)
- De Wolf Hopper - Mr. Pickwick (1903) at the Herald Square Theatre and later the Grand Opera House.
- William Wadsworth in Mr. Pickwick's Predicament (1912).
- John Bunny in the silent short The Pickwick Papers (1913).
- Frederick Volpe in The Adventures of Mr. Pickwick (1921), silent lost film.
- Charles Laughton portrayed the character in the 1928 production, Mr. Pickwick, at the Theatre Royal in London, as well as on the 1944 album Mr. Pickwick's Christmas.
- Ray Collins in The Pickwick Papers - Orson Welles's CBS Radio series.
- James Hayter in the 1952 film The Pickwick Papers
- George Howe (and later Clive Revill) in Mr. Pickwick at the Plymouth Theatre and the John Golden Theatre in New York (1952), and then the TV movie The Pickwick Papers (1953).
- Roddy Hughes - Bardell V. Pickwick (1955)
- John Salew in Tales from Dickens (aka Fredric March Presents Tales from Dickens) (1959).
- Patrick Newell in Mr. Pickwick - Belgrade Theatre, Coventry (1961).
- Harry Secombe, in the musical Pickwick (1963), by Cyril Ornadel, Wolf Mankowitz, and Leslie Bricusse. Secombe also appeared as Pickwick in the BBC TV movie-version Pickwick (1969).
- Arthur Brough in Uneasy Dreams: The Life of Mr. Pickwick (1970)
- Bill Reimbold in Dickens of London (1976)
- Nigel Stock in the 12-part BBC miniseries The Pickwick Papers (1985).

=== Other media ===
- In the Disneyland ride The Haunted Mansion, the ghost of a drunken, plump little man in Victorian garb, holding a bottle of wine, can be seen swinging from the chandelier in the ballroom tableau. Blueprints and concept art identify the character as "Pickwick", most likely in reference to Dickens's character.

== Legacy ==
The French composer Claude Debussy dedicated to this character a humorous piano piece: Hommage à S. Pickwick Esq. P.P.M.P.C. (n. 9 of Préludes, 2^{ème} Livre, published 1913).

Pickwick Island is the largest of the Pitt Islands, in the Biscoe Islands, Antarctica. It was named by the United Kingdom Antarctic Place-Names Committee (UK-APC) in 1959 after Samuel Pickwick, founder of the Pickwick Club.
