= Augustus Snodgrass =

Fictional character in The Pickwick Papers

- The Pickwick Papers character
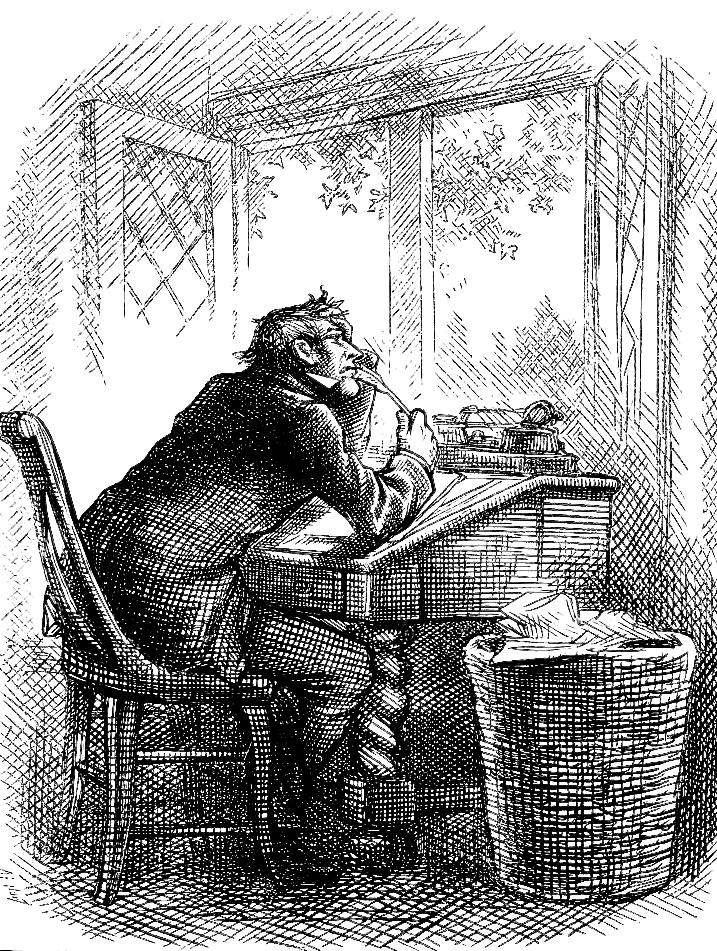
- The poetic Mr Augustus Snodgrass - Thomas Nast (1873)
- Created by: Charles Dickens

In-universe information
- Gender: Male
- Occupation: Poet; Farmer
- Significant other: Mrs Snodgrass (wife)
- Nationality: English

Augustus Snodgrass is a fictional character in Charles Dickens's first novel, The Pickwick Papers (1836–37). He considers himself a Romantic poet, though there is no mention of any of his own poetry in the novel.

A founder and younger member of the Pickwick Club created by the retired businessman Samuel Pickwick, he is one of Pickwick's travelling companions along with Nathaniel Winkle and Tracy Tupman who extend their scientific researches into the quaint and curious phenomena of British rural life by travelling to locations far distant from London to report on their findings to the other "Pickwickians" remaining at home.

Introduced by Dickens in Chapter One of The Pickwick Papers, Dickens does little to develop the character of Snodgrass in the novel. While described as a poet, and keeping extensive notes of his ideas for poems, he writes none throughout the story, at least, none that are mentioned or that he reads to his fellow travellers. In this way Snodgrass is depicted as an artistic poser, taking on the airs of artistry but with nothing achieved. At the inaugural meeting of the Pickwick Society Snodgrass is appointed the group's official poet and deputy-leader: "On the left of his great leader sat the poetic Snodgrass" (I, 10). While visiting Manor Farm in Dingley Dell in Kent Snodgrass falls in love with and eventually marries Emily Wardle.

By the end of the novel:

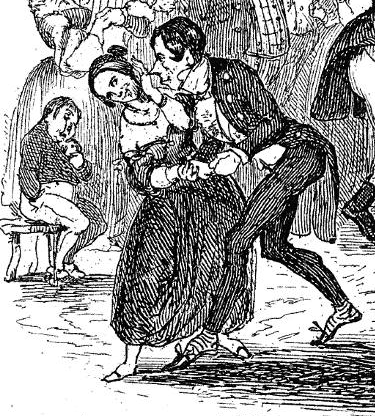
'Christmas Eve at Mr. Wardle's' - Snodgrass and Miss Wardle dancing - detail of Hablot Knight Browne's illustration (1837)

Mr. and Mrs. Snodgrass settled at Dingley Dell, where they purchased and cultivated a small farm, more for occupation than profit. Mr. Snodgrass, being occasionally abstracted and melancholy, is to this day reputed a great poet among his friends and acquaintance, although we do not find that he has ever written anything to encourage the belief. There are many celebrated characters, literary, philosophical, and otherwise, who hold a high reputation on a similar tenure.

== Legacy ==
Snodgrass Island, lying northeast of Pickwick Island, Pitt Islands, in the Biscoe Islands, was named by the United Kingdom Antarctic Place-Names Committee (UK-APC) in 1959 after Augustus Snodgrass.

== Notable portrayals ==
- George Chapman in Mr. Pickwick (1903) at the Herald Square Theatre and later the Grand Opera House.
- Sidney Hunt in The Pickwick Papers (1913)
- John Kelt in The Adventures of Mr. Pickwick (1921)
- Lionel Murton in The Pickwick Papers (1952)
- Robert Lankesheer - Bardell V. Pickwick (1955)
- Julian Orchard in Pickwick (1969)
- Alan Parnaby in The Pickwick Papers (1985)
