= The Pickwick Papers (1952 film) =

British historical comedy drama film

- Original British 1952 quad film poster
- Directed by: Noel Langley
- Screenplay by: Noel Langley
- Based on: The Pickwick Papers by Charles Dickens
- Produced by: George Minter; Noel Langley
- Starring: James Hayter; James Donald; Nigel Patrick; Joyce Grenfell; Hermione Baddeley; Hermione Gingold
- Cinematography: Wilkie Cooper
- Edited by: Anne V. Coates
- Music by: Antony Hopkins
- Production company: Renown Pictures
- Distributed by: Renown Pictures (UK)
- Release date: 14 November 1952 (UK)
- Running time: 115 minutes
- Country: United Kingdom
- Language: English

The Pickwick Papers is a 1952 British historical comedy drama film written and directed by Noel Langley and starring James Hayter, James Donald, Nigel Patrick and Joyce Grenfell. It is based on the Charles Dickens’s 1837 novel of the same name. It was made by Renown Pictures who had successfully released another Dickens adaptation Scrooge the previous year.

The film was made at the Nettlefold Studios in Walton-on-Thames. Shot in black-and-white, the film's sets were designed by the art director Frederick Pusey with costumes by Beatrice Dawson. It premiered at the Gaumont Cinema at Haymarket in London on 14 November 1952. In 1954, the Soviet Union paid £10,000 for the distribution rights, and it became the first British film to be shown in the Soviet Union after the Second World War, premiering on 29 July 1954 in a number of cities with a dubbed soundtrack. The film was followed a month later by a Russian reprint of Dickens' book, in 150,000 copies.

== Cast ==
- James Hayter as Samuel Pickwick
- James Donald as Nathaniel Winkle
- Nigel Patrick as Alfred Jingle
- Joyce Grenfell as Mrs Leo Hunter
- Hermione Gingold as Miss Tompkins
- Hermione Baddeley as Mrs Bardell
- Donald Wolfit as Sergeant Buzfuz
- Harry Fowler as Sam Weller
- Kathleen Harrison as Rachel Wardle
- Alexander Gauge as Tracy Tupman
- Lionel Murton as Augustus Snodgrass
- Diane Hart as Emily Wardle
- Joan Heal as Isabella Wardle
- William Hartnell as Irate Cabman
- Athene Seyler as Miss Witherfield
- Walter Fitzgerald as Mr Wardle
- Mary Merrall as Grandma Wardle
- Cecil Trouncer as Mr Justice Stareleigh
- Felix Felton as Dr Slammer
- Hattie Jacques as Mrs Nupkins
- Sam Costa as Job Trotter
- Noel Purcell as Roker
- Raymond Lovell as Aide
- George Robey as Tony Weller
- Max Adrian as Aide
- Alan Wheatley as Fogg
- D. A. Clarke-Smith as Dodson
- Jack MacNaughton as Mr Nupkins
- David Hannaford as Boy
- Gerald Campion as Joe, the Fat Boy
- June Thorburn as Arabella Allen
- Barry MacKay as Mr Snubbins
- Joan Benham as Miss Tompkins' Companion
- Graeme Harper as Master Bardell
- Arthur Mullard as Onlooker
- Cyril Smith as Ostler

== Awards and nominations ==
- James Hayter was nominated for the BAFTA Best British Actor award in 1953 for his portrayal of Samuel Pickwick.
- The Pickwick Papers was awarded a Golden Bear in Berlin in 1954
- In 1956, Beatrice Dawson was nominated for an Oscar for Best Costume Design, Black-and-White for the film's costumes.

== Critical reception ==
Leonard Maltin gave the film three out of four stars, calling it a "Flavorful adaptation of Dickens' classic"; and TV Guide rated it three out of five stars, writing, "If ever a Dickens novel shouted to be filmed, it was The Pickwick Papers, and a jolly good job was done with this version...It's a very funny film with some of England's best light comedians and comediennes."

== Colourised version ==
In 2012, a digitally restored and colourised version of the film was released on DVD, causing a renewed debate in the UK about colourisation of old black-and-white classics.

== Bibliography ==
- Harper, Sue & Porter, Vincent. British Cinema of the 1950s: The Decline of Deference. Oxford University Press, 2007.
