= The Pickwick Papers (1913 film) =

Silent film produced by Vitagraph Studios

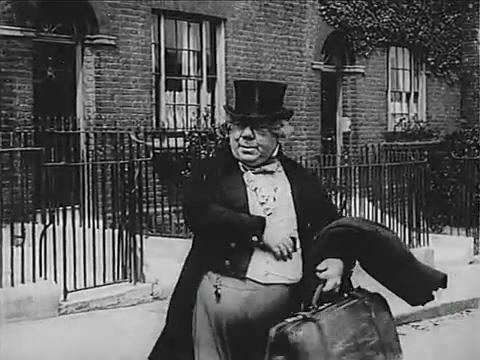
John Bunny as Samuel Pickwick

The Pickwick Papers is a 1913 three-reel silent film based on the 1837 novel of the same name by Charles Dickens. The film was produced by Vitagraph Studios and features John Bunny in the title role of Samuel Pickwick.

Bunny and the Vitagraph Company desired to make an authentic recreation of Dickens's novel, and filming took place in England rather than at Vitagraph's New York studio. Bunny regarded the finished film highly, and The Moving Picture World praised its fidelity to Dickens's work. The film did not achieve popularity among audiences, however, who preferred Bunny's usual output of one-reel comedies. Only two reels of the film survive in the holdings of the British Film Institute.

== Plot ==
The Pickwick Papers consisted of three reels, individually titled "The Adventure of the Honourable Event", "The Adventure at the Westgate Seminary", and "The Adventure of the Shooting Party". The film does not adapt Dickens's novel in its entirety; each reel depicts a distinct episode from the beginning of the book.

=== "The Honorable Event" ===
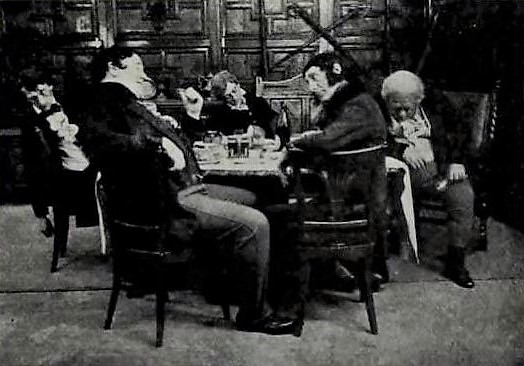
Dinner at the Bull Inn. From left to right: Tupman and Jingle (foreground); Snodgrass, Winkle, and Pickwick (background)

In "The Honourable Event", Mr. Pickwick catches a cab to meet three friends from his club but gets in an altercation with the cab driver upon arrival. The cabman is placated by a tall, thin gentleman named Mr. Jingle, whom Pickwick invites to dine at the Bull Inn in Rochester with his three friends—Mr. Snodgrass, Mr. Winkle, and Mr. Tupman. The group catches a coach to Rochester and dinner is served. As the evening progresses, all but Jingle and Tupman doze off, and the two decide to attend a charity ball being held that evening at the inn. As Jingle does not have the proper attire, Tupman takes clothes from the room of the sleeping Winkle for him to wear.

At the ball, Jingle incites the envy of one of the other guests, Dr. Slammer, by escorting a woman named Mrs. Budger to her carriage. The next morning, Slammer sends a message to the inn requesting a duel with "the slim gentleman" who had insulted him. The bewildered Winkle accepts the duel, believing he had inadvertently insulted someone while drunk the night before. The duel is about to commence when Slammer realizes that a mix-up has occurred. The two men return to the inn, whereupon Slammer recognizes Jingle as the man who had insulted him and again demands a duel. Pickwick, however, refuses to accept that Jingle has done anything wrong and sends Slammer on his way.

=== "The Shooting Party" ===
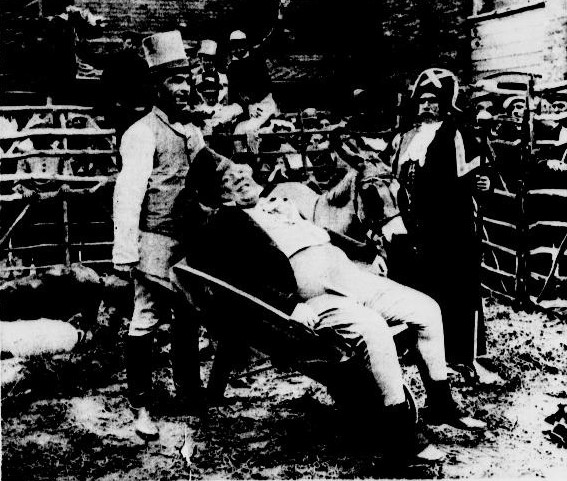
Pickwick as he is wheeled to the town jail

"The Shooting Party" begins with Pickwick and a group of friends—including Winkle, Tupman, and Pickwick's servant Sam Weller—setting out on a hunting expedition. As Pickwick is lame, he is carried in a wheelbarrow along the way by his servant. The party sits down for lunch on land belonging to an adjacent estate. Pickwick falls asleep, and the others continue with the expedition. The owner of the estate, Captain Boldwig, discovers Pickwick as he is making an inspection of his land and angrily sends Pickwick—still asleep in his wheelbarrow—off to the town jail, where his friends discover him that evening.

=== "The Westgate Seminary" ===
"The Westgate Seminary" opens with a conversation between Sam Weller and Mr. Jingle's servant, Job Trotter. Trotter falsely informs Weller that his master is planning to elope with a girl from the nearby Westgate boarding school for young ladies. Pickwick resolves to foil this elopement and scales the school walls that night with the goal of catching Jingle. Jingle does not arrive, however, and Pickwick is discovered by the frightened residents of the school, who lock him in a closet until the veracity of his story can be established. Upon the arrival of his friends, Pickwick is freed.

== Cast ==
The British Film Institute lists the following cast for the film:

- John Bunny as Samuel Pickwick
- Arthur Ricketts as Mr. Alfred Jingle
- Sidney Hunt as Mr. Augustus Snodgrass
- Minnie Rayner as Mrs. Budger
- James Pryor as Mr. Tracy Tupman
- Fred Hornby as Mr. Nathaniel Winkle
- Arthur White as Dr. Slammer
- H. P. Owen as Sam Weller
- George Temple as the Fat Boy
- Arthur Jackson as Captain Boldwig

The historian and archivist Sam Gill additionally lists David Upton as part of the cast for "The Adventure of the Shooting Party" but does not provide his role.

== Production ==
The Pickwick Papers was filmed in England rather than at the Vitagraph Company's main studio in Brooklyn, New York. Bunny, along with director Laurence Trimble and camera operator Arthur Ross, left for England on May 25, 1912. The principal goal of the trip was to film authentic scenes from Dickens's novel, with Bunny to select the actors for the other roles upon arrival in England. The group did not attempt to adapt The Pickwick Papers in its entirety—only three episodes from the beginning of the book were filmed, with the idea of adapting the rest of the novel if the initial releases should prove popular.

Bunny had proposed filming scenes from the novel in England to Vitagraph executives around a year before production took place. As he recounted in September 1912: "The making of Pickwick has been one of my fondest dreams for several years. It has been my desire to produce in pictures the famous character of Pickwick amid the very scenes of which Dickens wrote, and I think when these pictures we have made are shown to the public it will be said that our work has not been in vain."

Bunny's popularity was at its peak at the time he traveled to England. Regarding his time there, The Moving Picture World reported: "Whenever he appears upon the street in London he has to 'keep moving.' If he stops for any length of time he is in danger of arrest for blockading the sidewalk. He is so well-known by sight, through his appearances in the Vitagraph pictures, that everywhere he goes he is recognized and hailed with glee by the general run of mankind." While filming was taking place, Bunny was offered a contract by an English producer with a salary that considerably exceeded the $200 a week he was making at Vitagraph. Bunny cabled news of the offer to Vitagraph, and was promptly offered a raise that he found satisfactory.

Vitagraph was committed to producing an accurate and authentic adaptation of Dickens's novel. Bunny recounted to The Moving Picture World how the Vitagraph party attempted to borrow an original two-wheeled cab from the British Museum to use in the film, but were refused by the museum curators. The group apparently made an exact replica of this vehicle, and used it frequently in the film. According to Bunny, the four-wheeled coach used for the ride to Rochester in "The Honorable Event" was an original from the times of Pickwick. Bunny related that while filming in Rochester, large crowds gathered each day to watch the filming take place, and that nearly all of Rochester's police force was required to keep them at a proper distance.

Besides The Pickwick Papers, the Vitagraph party shot several one-reel films while abroad, including Bunny at Sea, filmed on board ship to England; Bunny at the Derby, filmed at Epsom Downs; Cork and Vicinity, filmed in Cork, Ireland; and The Blarney Stone, filmed at Blarney Castle. The group returned to the United States after three months abroad and incidental stops in Paris and Berlin.

== Release and reception ==
"The Honourable Event" and "The Adventure of Westgate Seminary" were released in the United States on February 28, 1913, and "The Adventure of the Shooting Party" was released on September 5, 1913. The first two reels were released in the United Kingdom on June 9, 1913, and the third reel was released on December 18, 1913.

Despite the effort Bunny and his associates invested in The Pickwick Papers, contemporary audiences did not take to the film, instead preferring the one-reel comedies Bunny was used to producing for Vitagraph. As Bunny recalled in 1915: "Listen, I went to England and put in some of the hardest work of my life in producing Mr. Pickwick. I found every place that was unchanged, from Dingley Dell to the White Hart Tavern, and we worked it all out true to life. I'm proud of those pictures—but they haven't sold at all in comparison with these things I'm turning out every week." According to Vitagraph's co-founder Albert E. Smith: "As Mr. Pickwick, Bunny won no new laurels, though we felt he deserved them. His followers would have no part of this sort of artistry; they preferred the old-line Bunny farce: the comic terror, the panic, the despair."

Hugh Hoffman of The Moving Picture World praised the film for using the original locations Dickens had written of, finding: "The pictures are saturated with local color and in every instance they live up to the very letter of the word of Dickens." He noted Bunny's compatibility for the role of Pickwick and also highlighted the contributions of Arthur Rickets as Mr. Jingle, writing that he closely resembled a drawing by the Dickens illustrator George Cruikshank.

Film scholar Michael Pointer criticized Bunny's portrayal of Pickwick, writing that "Bunny's heavy features and often gloomy expression did not really convey the idea of a benign benefactor". Caroline Millar of the British Film Institute found Vitagraph's adaptation overall to be "rather unadventurous". She criticized its use of title cards to convey the plot and noted that much of Jingle's comic wordplay is lost in the medium of silent film.

== Survival status ==
Only "The Honorable Event" and "The Westgate Seminary" survive in the British Film Institute National Archive.

== Notes ==
=== Works cited ===
- Dunham, Harold (Winter 1968–69), "John Bunny", The Silent Picture, no. 1, unpaged, ISSN 0037-5209
- Gill, Sam (Summer 1972), "John Bunny: A Filmography Compiled by Sam Gill", The Silent Picture, no. 15, pp. 8–15, ISSN 0037-5209
- Hoffman, Hugh (September 21, 1912), "John Bunny Abroad", The Moving Picture World, vol. 13, no. 12, p. 1157
- Hoffman, Hugh (February 15, 1913), "John Bunny as Pickwick", The Moving Picture World, vol. 15, no. 7, pp. 663–664
- Lanier, Henry Wysham (March 1915), "The Coquelin of the Movies", The World's Work, vol. 29, no. 5, pp. 567–577
- Millar, Caroline (n.d.), "Pickwick Papers, The (1913)", BFI Screenonline, British Film Institute, archived from the original on August 2, 2016
- Pointer, Michael (1996), Charles Dickens on the Screen: The Film, Television, and Video Adaptations, Scarecrow Press, ISBN 0-8108-2960-6
- Slide, Anthony; Gevinson, Alan (1987), The Big V: A History of the Vitagraph Company (revised ed.), Scarecrow Press, ISBN 0-8108-2030-7
- Smith, Albert E. (1952), Two Reels and a Crank, Garden City, NY: Doubleday & Company, OCLC 586891

=== Further reading ===
- Glavin, John, ed. (2003), Dickens on Screen, Cambridge University Press, ISBN 0-521-00124-2
