= The Cowboy and the Lady (1915 film) =

1915 film

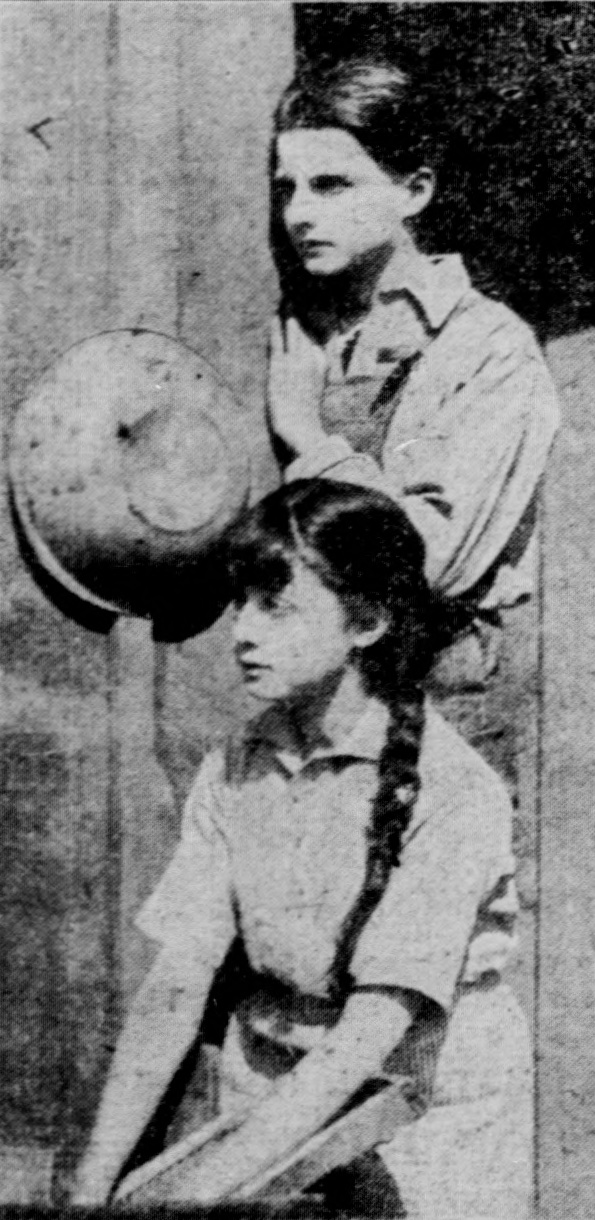
- Contemporary publicity photograph
- Directed by: Edwin Carewe
- Written by: Clyde Fitch(play)
- Based on: The Cowboy and the Lady; 1899 play by Clyde Fitch
- Produced by: B.A. Rolfe
- Starring: S. Miller Kent; Helen Case; Gertrude Short
- Distributed by: Metro Pictures
- Release date: April 12, 1915
- Running time: 5 reels
- Country: United States
- Languages: Silent; English intertitles

The Cowboy and the Lady is a 1915 silent feature film directed by Edwin Carewe and distributed by Metro Pictures. The film is based on Clyde Fitch's successful Broadway play that starred Maxine Elliott. Several versions of the story followed this film.

== Plot ==
A contemporary newspaper described the story as being about "the plains and the city".

== Cast ==
- S. Miller Kent as Ted North
- Helen Case as Margaret Primrose
- Gertrude Short
- Fred Hornby as (billed Fred W. Hornby)
- Bert Hadley
- William Ryno
- Edith Stevens

== Preservation ==
With no prints of The Cowboy and the Lady located in any film archives, it is considered a lost film.
