= The Adventures of Mr. Pickwick =

1921 British silent film by Thomas Bentley

- Directed by: Thomas Bentley
- Written by: Charles Dickens (novel); G. A. Baughan; Eliot Stannard
- Starring: Frederick Volpe; Mary Brough; Bransby Williams; Ernest Thesiger
- Production company: Ideal Film Company
- Distributed by: Ideal Film Company
- Release date: November 1921
- Country: United Kingdom
- Language: Silent

The Adventures of Mr. Pickwick is a 1921 British silent comedy film directed by Thomas Bentley based on the 1837 novel The Pickwick Papers by Charles Dickens. The film is missing from the BFI National Archive, and is listed as one of the British Film Institute's "75 Most Wanted" lost films.

== Plot ==
A contemporary review in Kinematograph Weekly outlined the plot as follows:

Opens with the forming of the Pickwick Club and introductions to its members, and is followed by Mr. Pickwick's instructions to his landlady, Mrs. Bardell, being misinterpreted by her as a proposal. The party travel by coach to Rochester, where the episode of Mr. Pickwick's entry into the wrong bedroom occurs. Mrs. Bardell visits a lawyer with a view to taking proceeding against her lodge. The party are seen at Dingley Dell. Mr. Tupman declares his intentions to Miss Rachael, who is persuaded to elope with Alfred Jingle. Mr. Winkle experiments with a gun; the whole party plays cricket. The eloping couple are stopped by Mr. Pickwick, who returns home to find his case has come into Court. The trial takes place, and the whole is concluded by a dance at Dingley Dell, in which Mr. Pickwick joins.

== Cast ==
- Frederick Volpe as Samuel Pickwick (as Fred Volpe)
- Mary Brough as Mrs Bardell
- Bransby Williams as Sgt Buzfuz
- Ernest Thesiger as Mr Jingle
- Kathleen Vaughan as Arabella Allen
- Joyce Dearsley as Isabella Wardle
- Arthur Cleave as Mr Nathaniel Winkle
- Athene Seyler as Rachel Wardle
- John Kelt as Mr. Augustus Snodgrass
- Hubert Woodward as Sam Weller
- Norman Page as Justice Stoneleigh

== Reception ==
Kinematograph Weekly considered the film as being "probably an exceptionally good booking proposition", praising it for being exceptionally well made by Bentley and highlighted the performance of Volpe as Pickwick as remarkable amongst, before concluding that "Dickens lovers have a treat in store."

The Daily News said that "the true spirit of Dickens, in his most genial and human vein has been caught more completely than in any stage play."

== See also ==
- List of lost films
