= Sam Weller (character) =

Fictional cockney bootblack character in The Pickwick Papers

- The Pickwick Papers character
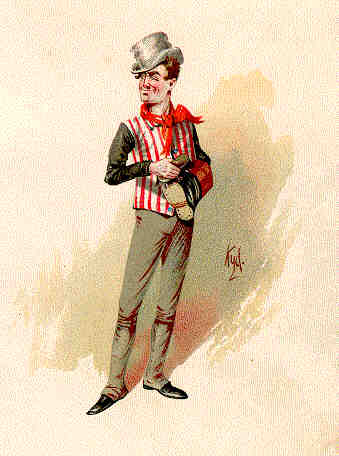
- Sam Weller by 'Kyd'
- Created by: Charles Dickens

In-universe information
- Gender: Male
- Occupation: Shoeshiner
- Family: Tony Weller (father)
- Nationality: English

Sam Weller is a fictional character in The Pickwick Papers (1836–37), the first novel by Charles Dickens, and the character that made Dickens famous. A humorous Cockney bootblack, Sam Weller first appeared in the fourth serialised episode. Previously the monthly parts of the book had been doing badly, selling only about 1,000 copies a month, but the humour of the character transformed the book into a publishing phenomenon, raising the sales by late autumn of 1837 to 40,000 a month.

On the impact of the character, The Paris Review stated, "arguably the most historic bump in English publishing is the Sam Weller Bump". Such was the popularity of the character that William Thomas Moncrieff named his 1837 burletta Samuel Weller, or, The Pickwickians after the main comic character in the novel, rather than on Samuel Pickwick himself. Merchandise based on the character appeared, such as Sam Weller puzzles, Weller boot polish and Weller joke books.

== Character ==
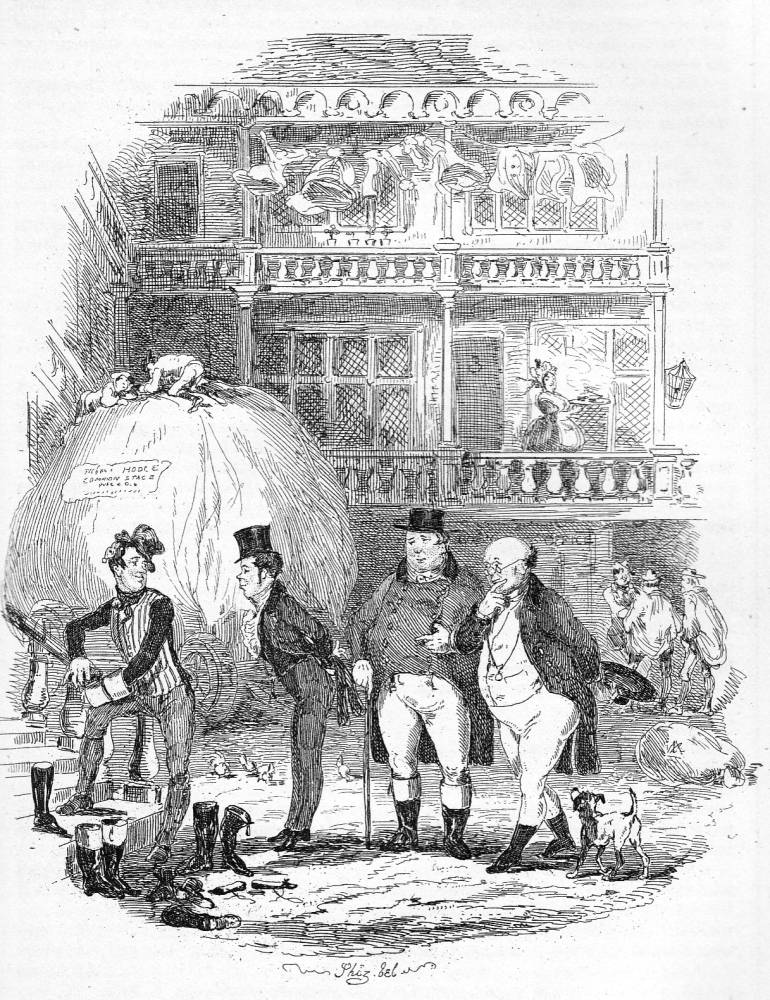
Mr Pickwick encounters Sam Weller - illustration by Hablot Knight Browne for The Pickwick Papers (July 1836)

In chapter 10 of the novel, the eponymous hero of the novel, Mr. Pickwick, meets Sam Weller working at the White Hart Inn in The Borough and soon takes him on as a personal servant and companion on his travels. Initially, Sam Weller accepts the job as Pickwick offered a good salary and a new set of fine clothes. However, as the novel progresses, Sam becomes deeply attached to Mr. Pickwick, with the relationship between the idealistic and unworldly Pickwick and the astute cockney Weller being likened to that between Don Quixote and Sancho Panza. While the elderly Mr. Pickwick is mostly a passive and innocent figure having an almost childlike simplicity, Sam Weller is depicted as 'street-wise', being the more experienced of the two despite his youth, and probably the most intelligent character in the novel. While Pickwick is quick to lose his temper Sam maintains his composure. While Pickwick has no interest in romance or marrying, Sam courts and eventually marries Mary, his Valentine – "a well-shaped female servant".

Weller's loyalty to Pickwick is such that when the latter is sent to the Fleet Prison for debt Weller gets himself arrested so that he can join Pickwick there and continue to serve and protect him. Weller refuses to marry his sweetheart as he believes his marriage will obstruct him from continuing to care for Mr. Pickwick. However, Pickwick makes arrangements that allow Weller to continue to work for him and still marry.

== Weller as a Cockney ==
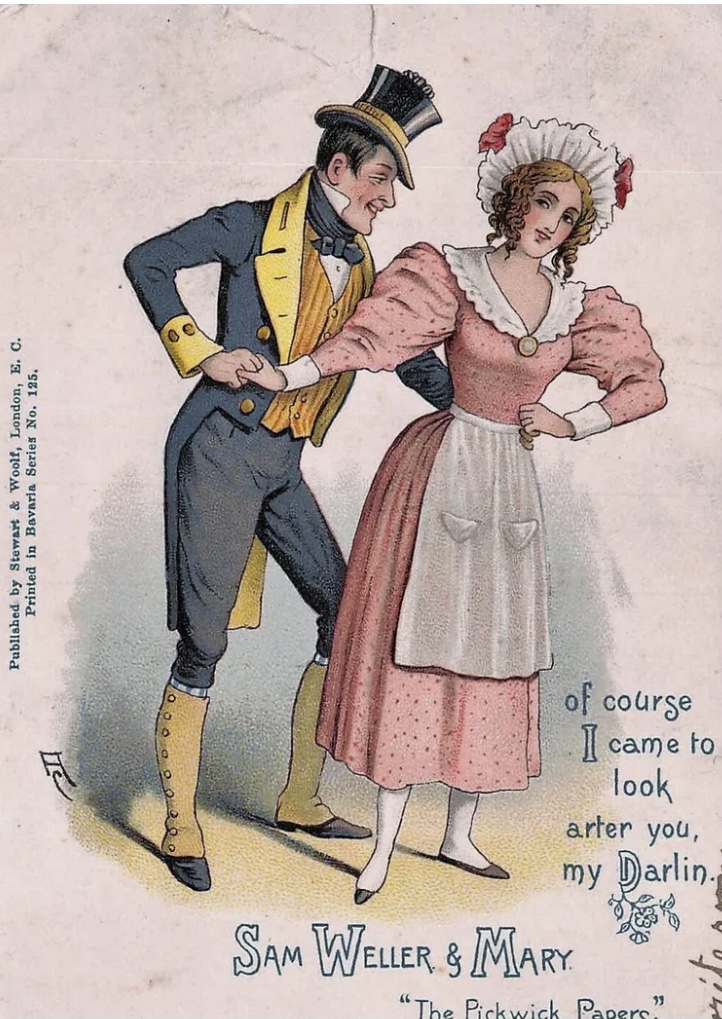
Sam Weller woos Mary - in a postcard of 1903

In the novel Sam is the son of Tony Weller, a coachman. The Wellers, father and son, speak a form of Cockney English prevalent in London's East End in 1836, pronouncing a "v" where there should be a "w", and "w” where there should be a "v" – "wery" instead of "very" and "avay" instead of "away" – in language that was outdated just 40 years after the novel's publication. Having trouble composing his Valentine's Card to his sweetheart, Mary, Sam consults his father, Tony Weller:

'Feel myself ashamed, and completely cir—' I forget what this here word is,' said Sam, scratching his head with the pen, in vain attempts to remember.

'Why don't you look at it, then?' inquired Mr. Weller.

'So I am a-lookin' at it,' replied Sam, "but there's another blot. Here’s a "c," and a "i," and a "d."'

'Circumwented, p'raps?' suggested Mr. Weller.

'No, it ain’t that,' said Sam, '"circumscribed"; that’s it.'

'That ain’t as good a word as "circumwented," Sammy,' said Mr. Weller gravely.

== Wellerisms in Pickwick Papers ==
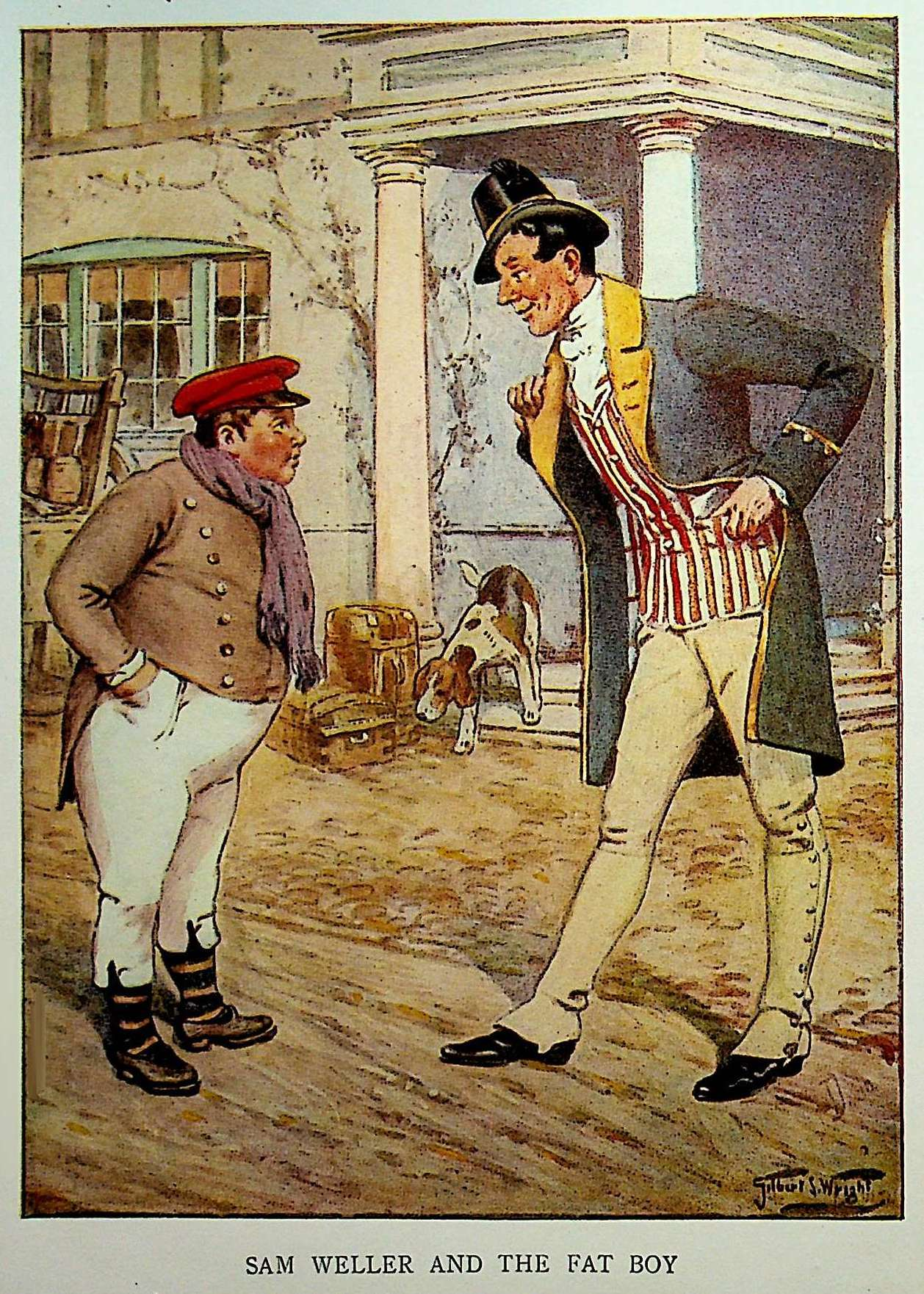
Sam Weller and the Fat Boy - Gilbert Scott Wright (1909)

Sam Weller's way of quoting people has led to the Wellerism, often a type of proverb. Examples in Pickwick Papers include:

- "Then the next question is, what the devil do you want with me, as the man said, wen he see the ghost?"
- "Out vith it, as the father said to his child, when he swallowed a farden."
- "Wery glad to see you, indeed, and hope our acquaintance may be a long 'un, as the gen'l'm'n said to the fi' pun' note."
- "All good feelin', sir – the wery best intentions, as the gen'l'm'n said ven he run away from his wife 'cos she seemed unhappy with him."
- "There; now we look compact and comfortable, as the father said ven he cut his little boy's head off, to cure him o' squintin'."
- "Vich I call addin' insult to injury, as the parrot said ven they not only took him from his native land, but made him talk the English langwidge arterwards."
- "Sorry to do anythin' as may cause an interruption to such wery pleasant proceedin's, as the king said wen he dissolved the parliament."

== Notable portrayals ==
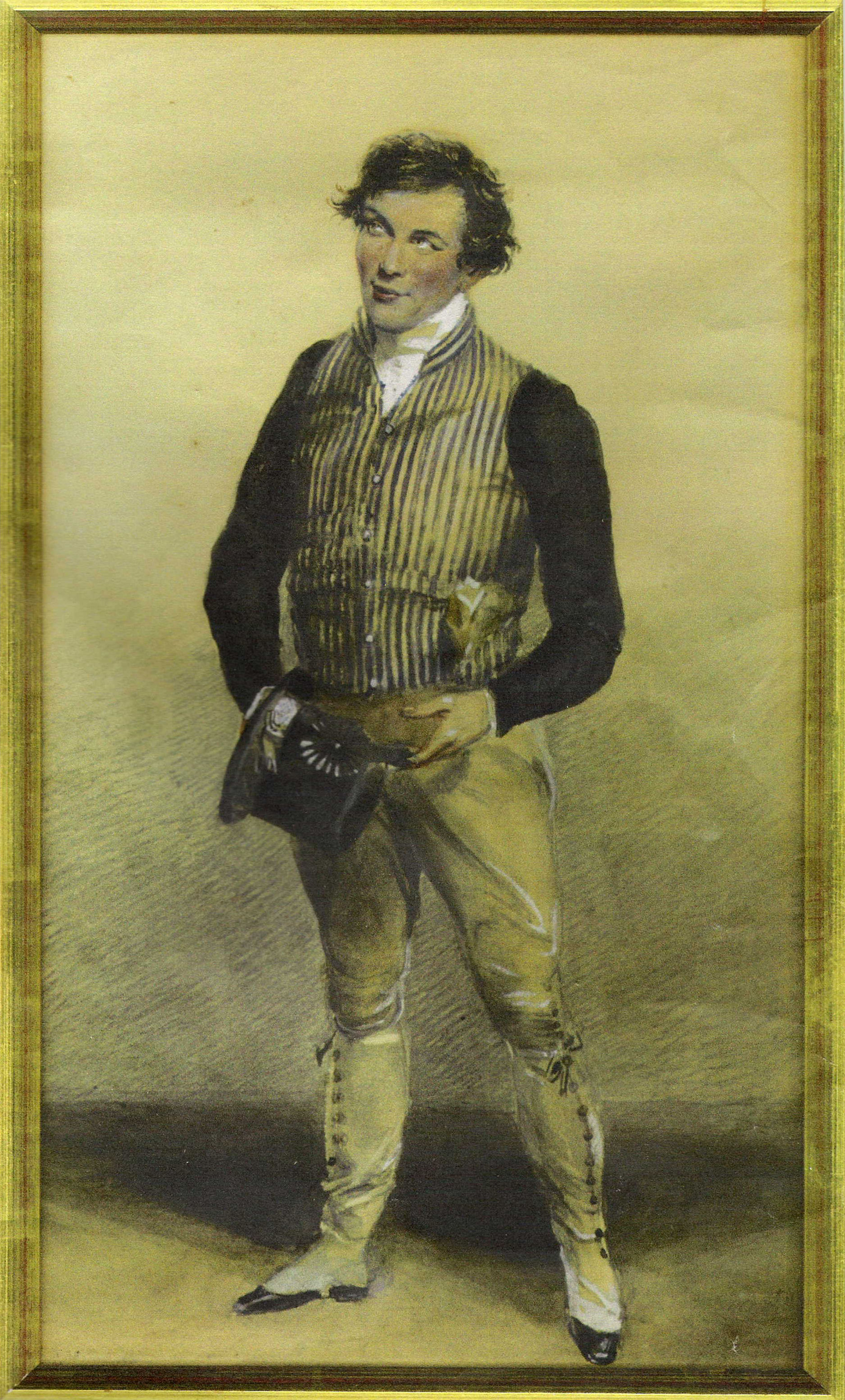
W. J. Hammond as Sam Weller in the original production of Samuel Weller, or, The Pickwickians (1837) - displayed in the Charles Dickens Museum

- One of the first actors to portray the character on stage was W. J. Hammond in Samuel Weller, or, The Pickwickians (1837) in a production staged while Dickens was still serialising the novel.
- Digby Bell - Mr. Pickwick (1903) at the Herald Square Theatre and later the Grand Opera House.
- H. P. Owen - The Pickwick Papers (1913)
- Hubert Woodward - The Adventures of Mr. Pickwick (1921)
- Sam Kydd - The Pickwick Papers BBC TV Serial 1952
- Harry Fowler - The Pickwick Papers (1952)
- Sam Kydd - Bardell V. Pickwick (1955)
- Teddy Green - Pickwick - West End musical (1963)
- Roy Castle - Broadway version (1965)
- Roy Castle - Pickwick - television musical (1969)
- Phil Daniels - The Pickwick Papers (1985)
