= Fred Hornby =

US silent film actor and director

Fred Hornby was a film director and comedic actor in silent films. He also performed in theatrical productions.

In 1909 he was in The Soul Kiss show and in 1912 he appeared in the theater production Making Good. He directed some of DeWolf Hopper's comedy productions.

The No Account Count

He traveled with John Bunny and filmed shorts along the way, including on the ship, and in England where the 1913 film The Pickwick Papers was shot on location.

He worked at Vitagraph where he directed comedian Bunny before Bunny died of Bright's disease in 1915. Hornby was a director at National studio.

== Filmography ==
=== Actor ===
- Two Cinders (1912)
- Leap Year Proposals (1912)
- Thou Shalt Not Covet (1912)
- A Bear Escape (1912), as Williams, circus owmer
- The Adventure of Westgate Seminary (1913), as Mr Winkle
- The Adventures of the Shooting Party (1913), as Mr. Winkle
- The Honourable Event (1913), as Winkle
- The Pickwick Papers (1913 film), as Mr. Winkle
- Tough Luck Smith (1914) as Rogers - Smith's Business Partner
- In Dutch (1914) as Tom Smith
- The Devil and Mrs. Walker (1914) as M. Henri - the French Barber
- Tough Luck Smith (1914) as Rogers - Smith's Business Partner
- Fatty and the Shyster Lawyer (1914) as O. K. Steel - Lawyer
- The Widow's Might (1914) as Tom - the Nephew
- A Wise Rube (1914) as Bill - Cy's City Cousin
- Universal Ike in the Neglected Wife (1914) as The Detective
- Universal Ike in Three of a Kind (1914)
- Through the Keyhole (1914) as Algernon Fortune - the Son
- Fatty and the Shyster Lawyer (1914) as O. K. Steel - Lawyer
- A Wise Rube (1914) as Bill - Cy's City Cousin
- Universal Ike in the Neglected Wife (1914) as The Detective
- Universal Ike in Three of a Kind (1914)
- Universal Ike Junior at the Dance of Little L.O. (1914)
- Universal Ike Junior on His Honeymoon (1914)
- Universal Ike Junior's Legacy (1914)
- Universal Ike Junior in His City Elopement (1914)
- Universal Ike Junior in Cupid's Victory (1914)
- Universal Ike Junior in Me, Him, and I (1914)
- Universal Ike Junior in a Case on the Doctor (1914)
- Universal Ike Junior Bearly Won Her (1914)
- Universal Ike Junior Is Kept from Being an Actor (1914)
- Universal Ike Junior in a Battle Royal (1914)
- Universal Ike in Pursuit of Eats (1914)
- Universal Ike Gets a Line on His Wife (1914)
- Universal Ike Almost a Hero (1914)
- Universal Ike and the School Belle (1914) as The Sheriff
- Universal Ike Makes a Monkey of Himself (1914)
- Universal Ike Has One Foot in the Grave (1914) as Sheriff Butternut
- No Account Count (1914), the Count
- Universal Ike Jr..is Kept From Being an Actor (1914)
- The Cowboy (1915)
- The Cowboy and the Lady (1915)
- The Mexican's Chickens (1915) as General Caramo
- Mr. Pepperie Temper (1915) as Bill Andrews

=== Director ===
- Call of the Hills (1923)
