= The Pickwick Papers (TV series) =

1985 British television drama series

- Based on: The Pickwick Papers by Charles Dickens
- Screenplay by: Jack Davies
- Directed by: Brian Lighthill
- Starring: Nigel Stock; Clive Swift; Alan Parnaby; Jeremy Nicholas; Ray Brooks; Phil Daniels
- Country of origin: United Kingdom
- Original language: English
- No. of seasons: 1
- No. of episodes: 12

Production
- Producer: Barry Letts

Original release
- Network: BBC One
- Release: 6 January – 24 March 1985

The Pickwick Papers is a twelve-part BBC adaptation of the 1837 novel The Pickwick Papers by Charles Dickens. The series was first broadcast in 1985. It starred Nigel Stock, Alan Parnaby, Clive Swift and Patrick Malahide, with narration by Ray Brooks.

== Central characters ==
- Nigel Stock as Samuel Pickwick – the protagonist and founder of the Pickwick Club
- Jeremy Nicholas as Mr Nathaniel Winkle – travelling companion and friend of Pickwick's; a reluctant sportsman
- Alan Parnaby as Mr Augustus Snodgrass – another companion and friend; an amiable poet
- Clive Swift as Mr Tracy Tupman – another friend; a very flirtatious man
- Phil Daniels as Sam Weller – Mr Pickwick's valet
- Howard Lang as Tony Weller – Sam's father; does not really know whether his name is written as Veller or Weller
- Patrick Malahide as Mr Alfred Jingle – a strolling player and a charlatan
- Colin Douglas as Mr Wardle – friend of Pickwick's, a widower with two daughters
- Milton Johns as Mr Perker – Pickwick's lawyer
- Pip Donaghy as Job Trotter – Jingle's servant
- Jo Kendall as Mrs. Bardell – Pickwick's landlady

== Other characters ==
- Dione Inman – Isabella Wardle
- Valerie Whittington – Emily Wardle
- Ned Williams – Master Bardell
- David Nunn – Joe (Fat Boy)
- Patience Collier – Old Mrs. Wardle
- Freda Dowie – Rachel Wardle
- Hugh Ross – Jackson
- Tamsin Heatley – Mary
- Sarah Finch – Arabella Allen
- Shirley Cain – Miss Witherfield
- Dallas Cavell – Roker
- Gerald James – Dr. Slammer
- John Patrick – Lt. Tappleton
- Russell Denton – Waiter (Bull Inn)
- Anthony Roye – Dodson
- Kenneth Waller – Fogg
- Alan Mason – Dying prisoner
- Paddy Ward- Wardle Manservant
- John Woodnutt – Sergeant Snubbin
- Michael Ripper – Phunkey
- Nicholas Jeune- Trundle
- June Ellis – Cook
- Richard Henry – Lowten
- David Beckett – Benjamin Allen
- Deddie Davies – Mrs. Cluppins
- Stephen Finlay – Bob Sawyer
- George Little – Peter Magnus
- James Cossins – Nupkins

== List of Episodes ==
No.	Title	Original release date
1	"Episode One"	6 January 1985
Pickwick, Tupman, Snodgrass and Winkle are members of the Pickwick Club. They take a journey to Rochester, whey there are accompanied by Mr Jingle on the stagecoach who they later invite to supper whilst staying at The Bull Inn later that evening. The group falls asleep after consuming too much wine, while Tupman and Jingle sneak off to a ball that is taking place upstairs. Jingle borrows Winkle's top-coat which causes a case of mistaken identity when he offends Dr. Slammer who subsequently challenges him to a duel. At the inn Winkle is alarmed to hear about this request, the Pickwinians relucatantly head out to the duelling grounds.
2	"Episode Two"	13 January 1985
Winkle and the other Pickwinians rendezvous at the meeting point, as he prepares for his imminent duel. But upon meeting his opponent Captain Slammer discovers that Winkle is not the man who insulted him the night before. They return to the Bull Inn where Slammer confronts Jingle and they all discover the Jingle is a strolling player. Later on, Pickwick and his friends are invited by Mr Wardle to his manor farm at Dingley Dell. The following morning whilst going out rook-hunting, Winkle accidentally shoots Tupman in the arm.
3	"Episode Three"	20 January 1985
Whilst recuperating from his gunshot wound Tupman falls for Wardle's sister Rachel. Meanwhile Pickwick and his friends encounter Jingle again, and he is invited by Wardle to Dingley Dell. Jingle later finds out about Tupman's dalliance with Rachel and seeks to disrupt their union and marry her himself, the couple later elope to London. Upon hearing about this, Pickwick and Wardle go after them in pursuit. They meet Sam Weller who works at The White Hart Inn, who reveals that the couple have been lodging in one of the rooms.
4	"Episode Four"	27 January 1985
Wardle, Pickwick and his lawyer Mr Perker collar Winkle and Rachel in their room. Perker persuades Winkle to cancel the wedding if he accepts £120 compensation, which he readily accepts and quickly departs. Impressed with Weller's help, Pickwick informs his landlady Mrs. Bardwell that he plans to employ Weller as his manservant, however she misconstrudes his comments and mistakens it for an offer of marriage. Perker is employed as an election agent and following the election, he invites Pickwick and his friends to a party at Eastanswill. The Pickwicknians encounter Jingle at the party, where he makes a quick getaway.
5	"Episode Five"	3 February 1985
Pickwick and Weller follow Jingle to Bury St Edmunds. Whilst staying at the Star Inn, Weller meets Jingle's manservant Job Trotter, who gives them a tip-off that Jingle plans to elope with a rich heiress from a girls boarding school later that evening. Weller and Pickwick break into the grounds, however Pickwick gets caught and finds out that he's been set up. The following morning at the inn, Pickwick opens a letter and discovers that he faces a suit for breach of promise of marriage from Bardell. Before he heads off to London, Wardle insists that the Pickwinians join him for a spot of game hunting. Pickwick later falls asleep at the picnic and is left behind, later he is accused by the landowner Captain Boldwig with trespassing on his property.
6	"Episode Six"	10 February 1985
In London, Pickwick approaches solicitors Dodson and Fogg in an attempt to resolve his breach of promise lawsuit, yet his pleas are rebuffed. At lunch, Pickwick and Sam run into his father Tony Weller at the pub, and discover that Mr Jingle has fled to Ipswich. They decide to follow Jingle, Tony offers to take them on the stagecoach which he helps manage, the two men are accompanied on their journey by Peter Magnus. After arriving in Ipswich they stay at an inn, later that night Pickwick gets lost in a bid to locate his room, and subsequently enters Miss Witherfield's room by error. The following morning Weller confronts Job Trotter in town, while Pickwick is reunited with his fellow Pickwinians. Magnus introduces Pickwick to his fiance Witherfield, who is shocked at meeting Pickwick again following their late night encounter. Magnus is enraged and misconstrudes the situation.
7	"Episode Seven"	17 February 1985
Witherfield appeals to Nupkins, the local magistate to prevent a potential duel between Pickwick and Magnus. Nupkins issues an arrest warrant and sends out his constable Grummer to apprehend Pickwick and his friends. At the inn, Weller returns just as Grummer proceeds to take the Pickwinians into custody, enraged by this he attacks him and is also arrested. At the magistrates, Nupkins informs the party why they have been charged and Pickwick tries to defend himself. Meanwhile, Weller recognises the location and informs his master. Pickwick and Weller notify Nupkins that his acquaintance Captain Charles Fitzmarshal is an imposter, in reality he is Mr Jingle. Shocked by this revelation, Nupkins drops the charges. He later invites Pickwick and Weller to tea, where they plan to spring a trap on Jingle and Trotter who also happen to be visiting.
8	"Episode Eight"	24 February 1985
Wardle invites the Pickwinians to spend Christmas at Dingley Dell. Winkle is immediately smitten by Arabella Allen, and later at the party he informs her that he wishes to marry, however Arabella confesses that she's an orphan and her sole guardian is her brother Benjamin who has already promised her to his friend Bob Sawyer. On Boxing Day morning, before the Pickwinians leave for London, Winkle meets Benjamin and Bob, his hopes of marrying Arrabella are dashed. A few days later while Pickwick, Tupman, Winkle and Snodgrass stay at the George and Vulture inn, Jackson (a clerk from Dodson & Fogg) arrives and delivers them each subpoenas for the lawsuit, Weller is also given one for openly trying to interfere with the case after visiting Bardell in a failed attempt to have the case dropped at Pickwick's request. Later on, Pickwick discusses his grievances about the lawsuit with his lawyer Perker and he promptly arranges a meeting with his defence barrister Serjeant Stubbin who'll be representing him at the hearing.
9	"Episode Nine"	3 March 1985
The court hearing for the breach of promise lawsuit between Bardell and Pickwick takes place. The Pickwinians enter the chamber along with Weller, Perker and defence barristers Stubbin and Phunkin. The judge Justice Stareleigh staggers onto the bench in an inebriated state, and has trouble trying to stay awake. Shortly after Bardell enters accompanied by her son, companions, along with Dodson and Fogg who have instructed the party to openly sob throughout the hearing, in order to sway the judgement of the jury. The prosectuing barrister Serjeant Buzfuz questions Mrs. Cluppins on the witness stand, she informs the jury that she listened to the whole incident, despite not seeing it. Winkle subsequently is questioned, and explains his take on the incident. He is then cross-examined by Phunkin and lets slip about Pickwick's incident with Miss Witherfield, Buzfuz takes the opportunity to paint Pickwick as a philanderer. He later questions Weller about his meeting with Bardell the previous November, he reveals that Dodson and Fogg took the case on spec and charged nothing, this causes a stir in the courtoom and Weller is removed from the stand. The jury soon reach their verdict and the foreman announces that they have voted in favour of the plaintiff, Pickwick is fined £750 by the court.
10	"Episode Ten"	10 March 1985
Pickwick refuses to pay the damages, and is remanded at Fleet Prison. Upon arrival, his lawyer Perker makes a last ditch appeal for Pickwick to renumerate the fine, but he steadfastly refuses. Pickwick and Weller are given a tour around the prison by the Warden, Pickwick is shocked by the destitution and misery around him. He pays for lodgings in one of the better condition rooms, but later that night he is awoken by Smangle and Mivens, who stagger into the room in a drunken state. He discovers that they come from a similar class background. The following morning, Pickwick makes a request to the warden about securing the services of someone who he can run errands for him outside the prison. He is sent to the poor side of prison, where he bumps into Jingle and Trotter who are in an impoverished state. Later, Pickwick secures lodgings at a private room, and announces to Weller that he'll be dismissing his services forthwith.
11	"Episode Eleven"	17 March 1985
Weller discusses with his father his concerns about Pickwick's welfare. He then concocts a plan to forfeit on honouring a loan, so he can be sent to Fleet Prison. The swindle works and Weller is sent to prison, much to Pickwick's astonishment. A few days later his fellow Pickwinians come to visit him to discuss a matter concerning Winkle, who is reluctant to inform them about his situation. Later, Weller is surprised to discover that Pickwick has acted as a beneficiary towards Jingle, despite his earlier aminosity. Meanwhile, Jackson is sent by his employers to take Mrs. Bardwell to prison, for not honouring her debts to Dodson & Fogg. Perker soon appeals to Pickwick to pay the damages in order to secure his release, though Pickwick is reluctant to agree. However his stance soon changes when Winkle visits with his new bride Arabella Allen, and announces that they have eloped.
12	"Episode Twelve"	24 March 1985
Having resolved matters with Arabella's brother Benjamin and his friend Bob Sawyer, they visit the home of Winkle's father to discuss about his son's runaway marriage. Winkle Sr. strongly shows his objections about the matter and threatens to withdraw his support to him. Arabella is saddened by her father-in-law's behaviour, though Pickwick reassures her that he will financially support her husband should Winkle Sr. carry through with his intentions. Later, Pickwick discusses with Ben about his son's attachment to Arrabella's maid Mary and seeks approval for his consent in marriage, which he readily accepts. Pickwick informs Weller that he wishes to free him for his position so he can marry Mary. Despite Weller's reluctance, Pickwick reassures him that he soon plans to retire to a town on the outskirts of London and will require the services of married couple to manage the house. At the inn, Winkle Sr. meets with Arabella, despite his misgivings about their runaway marriage, he decides to give his approval and continue with the support. Over at dinner, the Pickwinians accompanied by their spouses, along with Wardle, Perker and Winkle Sr. raise a toast to Pickwick, praising his benevolent nature.

== Home media ==
The complete series was released on DVD as part of The Charles Dickens Collection by 2Entertain on 23 January 2012, comprising eight BBC television adaptions of Dickens novels.
