= Tracy Tupman =

Fictional character in The Pickwick Papers

- The Pickwick Papers character
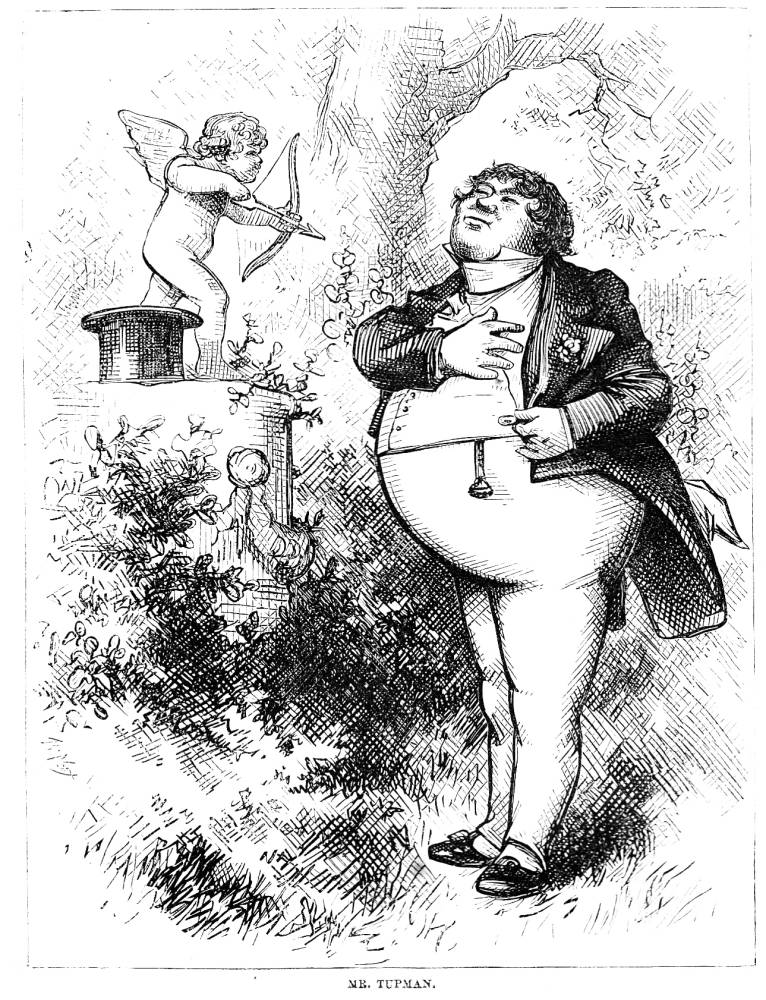
- Cupid shoots his arrow into the heart of Tracy Tupman - illustration by Thomas Nast (1873)
- Created by: Charles Dickens

In-universe information
- Gender: Male
- Nationality: English

Tracy Tupman is a fictional character in Charles Dickens's first novel, The Pickwick Papers (1836–37). Although fat and middle-aged he considers himself a young lover and has an unfortunate amorous entanglement with the spinster Rachael Wardle.

== Background ==
A founder and member of the Pickwick Club created by the retired businessman Samuel Pickwick, he is one of Pickwick's travelling companions along with Nathaniel Winkle and Augustus Snodgrass who extend their scientific researches into the quaint and curious phenomena of British rural life by travelling to locations far distant from London to report on their findings to the other "Pickwickians" remaining at home.

Dickens describes him in Chapter One of The Pickwick Papers

On Mr Pickwick's right sat Mr Tracy Tupman. This Mr Tupman had the wisdom and experience of mature years but added to this was the enthusiasm and strong emotions of a boy, because Mr Tupman suffered from the most interesting and pardonable of human weaknesses - love.

Time and feeding had expanded his once romantic body; the black silk waistcoat had become larger and larger; inch by inch the gold watch-chain beneath that waistcoat had disappeared from Mr Tupman's sight; and gradually his chin had grown until it hid the white tie around his neck. But the soul of Tupman was completely unchanged - admiration of the fair sex was still the most important thing for him.

He is accidentally shot in the arm while hunting fowl by the inept sportsman Nathaniel Winkle.

== Tupman woos Miss Wardle ==
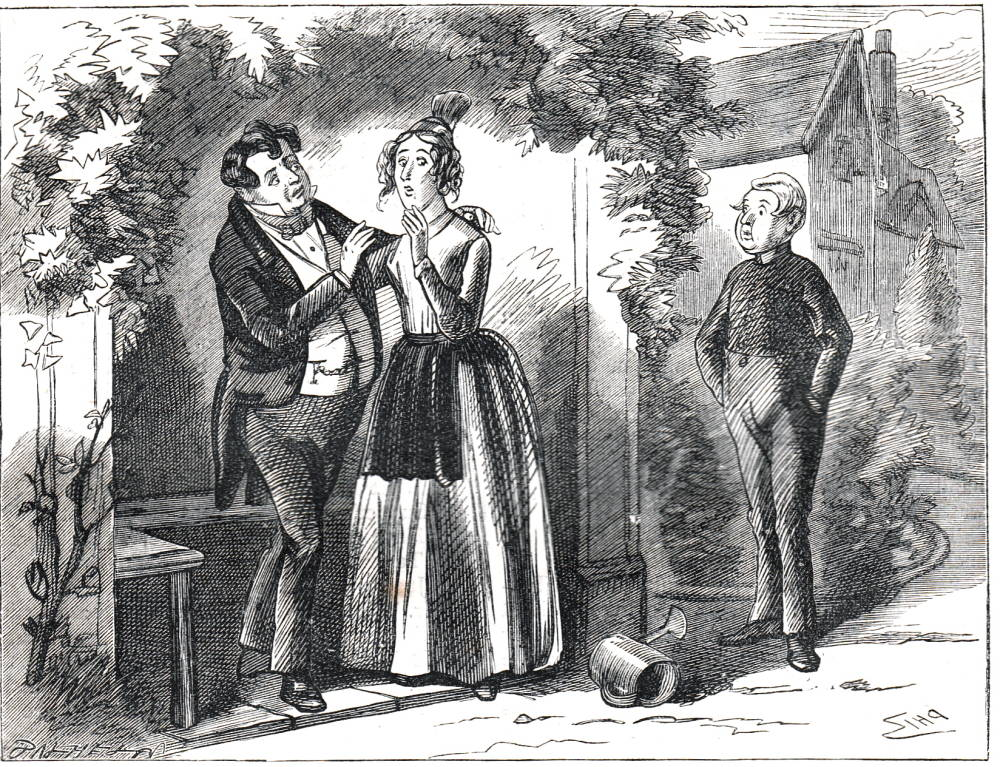
Mr. Tupman looked round. There was the fat boy - Hablot Knight Browne (1874)

Despite being middle-aged and portly, Tupman is a flirtatious ladies' man who regularly falls in and out of love but who is never successful in affairs of the heart. Tupman falls in love with Mr. Wardle's wealthy spinster sister, Rachael Wardle, and, initially at least, she with he.

The spinster aunt took up a large watering-pot which lay in one corner, and was about to leave the arbour. Mr. Tupman detained her, and drew her to a seat beside him.

“Miss Wardle!” said he.

The spinster aunt trembled, till some pebbles which had accidentally found their way into the large watering-pot shook like an infant’s rattle.

“Miss Wardle,” said Mr. Tupman, “you are an angel.”

“Mr. Tupman!” exclaimed Rachael, blushing as red as the watering-pot itself.

“Nay,” said the eloquent Pickwickian—“I know it but too well.”

“All women are angels, they say,” murmured the lady playfully.

“Then what can you be; or to what, without presumption, can I compare you?” replied Mr. Tupman. “Where was the woman ever seen who resembled you? Where else could I hope to find so rare a combination of excellence and beauty? Where else could I seek to—Oh!” Here Mr. Tupman paused, and pressed the hand which clasped the handle of the happy watering-pot.

The lady turned aside her head. “Men are such deceivers,” she softly whispered.

“They are, they are,” ejaculated Mr. Tupman; “but not all men. There lives at least one being who can never change—one being who would be content to devote his whole existence to your happiness—who lives but in your eyes—who breathes but in your smiles—who bears the heavy burden of life itself only for you.”

“Could such an individual be found—” said the lady.

“But he can be found,” said the ardent Mr. Tupman, interposing. “He is found. He is here, Miss Wardle.” And ere the lady was aware of his intention, Mr. Tupman had sunk upon his knees at her feet.

“Mr. Tupman, rise,” said Rachael.

“Never!” was the valorous reply. “Oh, Rachael!” He seized her passive hand, and the watering-pot fell to the ground as he pressed it to his lips.—“Oh, Rachael! say you love me.”

“Mr. Tupman,” said the spinster aunt, with averted head, “I can hardly speak the words; but—but—you are not wholly indifferent to me.”

Mr. Tupman no sooner heard this avowal, than he proceeded to do what his enthusiastic emotions prompted, and what, for aught we know (for we are but little acquainted with such matters), people so circumstanced always do. He jumped up, and, throwing his arm round the neck of the spinster aunt, imprinted upon her lips numerous kisses, which after a due show of struggling and resistance, she received so passively, that there is no telling how many more Mr. Tupman might have bestowed, if the lady had not given a very unaffected start, and exclaimed in an affrighted tone—

“Mr. Tupman, we are observed! — we are discovered!”

However, despite Tupman's protestations of affection she elopes with the engaging charlatan and trickster Alfred Jingle. Pickwick and Mr. Wardle pursue the couple to London where they pay off Jingle and rescue Rachael Wardle from an unhappy marriage. Tupman writes to Mr Pickwick, "You do not know what it is, at one blow, to be deserted by a lovely and fascinating creature, and to fall victim to the artifices of a villain." Overcome with melancholy, Tupman absents himself from his friends with the intention of doing away with himself but instead is found by them at Cobham with his other great love - a plate of food.

Eventually, Tupman takes lodgings at Richmond, where he "walks continuously on the Terrace during the summer months, with a youthful and jaunty air which has rendered him the admiration of the numerous elderly ladies of the single condition, who reside in the vicinity. He has never proposed again."

== Legacy ==
Tupman Island lies east of Pickwick Island, Pitt Islands, in the Biscoe Islands. It was named by the United Kingdom Antarctic Place-Names Committee (UK-APC) in 1959 after Tracy Tupman.

== Notable portrayals ==
- Augustus Colette in Mr. Pickwick (1903) at the Herald Square Theatre and later the Grand Opera House.
- James Pryor in The Pickwick Papers (1913)
- Alexander Gauge in The Pickwick Papers (1952)
- Campbell Gray - Bardell V. Pickwick (1955)
- Robert Dorning in Pickwick (1969)
- Clive Swift in The Pickwick Papers (1985)
