= James Hayter (actor) =

British actor (1907–1983)

- Hayter in 1975
- Born: Henry James Goodenough Hayter; 23 April 1907; Lonavala, Bombay Presidency, British India
- Died: 27 March 1983 (aged 75); Villajoyosa, Spain
- Education: Royal Academy of Dramatic Art
- Occupation: Actor
- Years active: 1936–1980
- Spouse(s): Marjorie Lane (m. 1934; div.); Mary E. R. Shaw (m. 1946)
- Children: 8
- Relatives: Charity Wakefield (granddaughter)

Henry James Hayter (23 April 1907 – 27 March 1983) was a British actor of television and film. He is best remembered for his roles as Friar Tuck in the film The Story of Robin Hood and His Merrie Men (1952) and as Samuel Pickwick in the film The Pickwick Papers (1952), the latter earning him a BAFTA Award for Best British Actor nomination.

== Early life ==
Hayter was born in Lonavala, India, and brought up in Scotland, attending Dollar Academy. He made his West End debut in the 1936 comedy The Composite Man at Daly's Theatre. His best remembered film roles include Friar Tuck in the 1952 film The Story of Robin Hood and His Merrie Men (he reprised the same role in the 1967 film A Challenge for Robin Hood) and Samuel Pickwick in The Pickwick Papers of the same year. His rotund appearance and fruity voice made him a natural choice for such roles.

== Acting career ==
As an actor, Hayter became a graduate of the Royal Academy of Dramatic Art. His film career began in 1936 in Sensation, but was interrupted by World War II, during which he served in the Royal Armoured Corps. His 1946 television series Pinwright's Progress, shown on the BBC, is recognised as the first real example of the half-hour situation comedy format in the history of British television.

In the 1968 film Oliver!, Hayter played Mr Jessop, the bookshop owner. He appeared in scenes when Dodger steals a gentleman's wallet outside the bookshop and also when Oliver is in court charged with the robbery. Hayter was the Ministry doorman in the film Passport to Pimlico (1949).

His later career included roles in TV series such as The Forsyte Saga (1967) and The Onedin Line. In 1967, Hayter appeared in The Avengers episode "A Funny Thing Happened On The Way to the Station" as the ticket collector. He also appeared as Dickson McCunn in the BBC serial Huntingtower, based on the book by John Buchan.

Hayter also appeared in the long-running BBC department store sitcom Are You Being Served? as the senior salesman Mr Tebbs in 1978. He was the original narrator of the UK television advertisements for Mr Kipling cakes. These adverts actually led to his departure from Are You Being Served?; the cake company paid him a significant bonus to withdraw from the series, as they felt his reputation lent an air of dignity to their advertisements. "Who can blame an actor in his seventies for accepting money for staying at home? I, now 78, would jump at the chance!" wrote Frank Thornton (Captain Peacock in the series) in a letter to one of Hayter's eight children in 1999.

== Personal life and death ==
He died in Spain in 1983, aged 75.

== Partial filmography ==
- Sensation (1936) – Jock
- Aren't Men Beasts! (1937) – Minor Role (uncredited)
- Big Fella (1937) – Chuck
- Marigold (1938) – Peter Cloag
- Murder in Soho (1939) – Nick Green
- Come On George! (1939) – Barker
- Band Waggon (1940) – Minor Role (uncredited)
- Sailors Three (1940) – Hans
- The Laughing Lady (1946) – Ostler, Turk's Head
- School for Secrets (1946) – Warrant Officer
- Nicholas Nickleby (1947) – Ned Cheeryble / Charles Cheeryble
- Captain Boycott (1947) – Music Hall Comic (uncredited)
- The October Man (1947) – Garage Man
- The Ghosts of Berkeley Square (1947) – Capt. Dodds (uncredited)
- The End of the River (1947) – Chico
- The Mark of Cain (1947) – Dr. White
- Vice Versa (1948) – Bandmaster
- My Brother Jonathan (1948) – Tom Morse
- A Song for Tomorrow (1948) – Nicholas Klausmann
- The Fallen Idol (1948) – Perry
- Woman Hater (1948) – Mr. Burrell
- No Room at the Inn (1948) – Councilor Trouncer
- Quartet (1948) – Foreman of the Jury (segment "The Alien Corn")
- Bonnie Prince Charlie (1948) – Kingsburgh
- Once a Jolly Swagman (1949) – Pa Fox
- Silent Dust (1949) – Pringle
- The Blue Lagoon (1949) – Doctor Murdoch
- All Over the Town (1949) – Councillor Baines
- Passport to Pimlico (1949) – Commissionaire
- For Them That Trespass (1949) – John Craigie 'Jocko' Glenn
- Don't Ever Leave Me (1949) – Man with Summons
- Helter Skelter (1949) – Inn landlord (uncredited)
- Dear Mr. Prohack (1949) – Carrell Quire
- The Spider and the Fly (1949) – Mayor
- Your Witness (1950) – Prouty, Trial Witness
- Morning Departure (1950) – Able Seaman Higgins
- Night and the City (1950) – Figler, King of the Beggars (uncredited)
- Waterfront (1950) – Ship's captain
- Trio (1950) – Albert Foreman – (segment The Verger)
- The Woman with No Name (1950) – Capt. Bradshawe
- Flesh and Blood (1951) – Sir Douglas Manley
- Calling Bulldog Drummond (1950) – Bill
- Tom Brown's School Days (1951) – Old Thomas
- The Story of Robin Hood and His Merrie Men (1952) – Friar Tuck
- I'm a Stranger (1952) – Horatio Flowerdew
- The Crimson Pirate (1952) – Prof. Elihu Prudence
- The Pickwick Papers (1952) – Samuel Pickwick
- The Great Game (1953) – Joe Lawson
- Four Sided Triangle (1953) – Dr. Harvey
- Always a Bride (1953) – Dutton
- Will Any Gentleman...? (1953) – Dr. Smith
- A Day to Remember (1953) – Fred Collins
- For Better, for Worse (1954) – The Plumber
- Beau Brummell (1954) – Mortimer
- The Awakening (1954) - The Chief
- See How They Run (1955) – Bishop of Lax
- Land of the Pharaohs (1955) – Mikka, Vashtar's Servant
- Touch and Go (1955) – Kimball
- Keep It Clean (1956) – Mr. Bouncenboy
- Port Afrique (1956) – Nino
- It's a Wonderful World (1956) – Bert Fielding
- Seven Waves Away (1957) – 'Cookie' Morrow
- Carry On Admiral (1957) – Member of Parliament (uncredited)
- The Heart Within (1957) – Grandfather Willard
- Sail Into Danger (1957) – Monty
- Gideon's Day (1958) – Robert Mason
- The Big Money (1958) – Mr. Frith
- I Was Monty's Double (1958) – Sgt. Adams
- The Captain's Table (1959) – Earnshaw
- The 39 Steps (1959) – Mr. Memory
- The Boy and the Bridge (1959) – Tugboat Skipper
- The Moonstone (1959) – Gabriel Betteredge
- Go to Blazes (1962) – Pipe Smoker
- Out of the Fog (1962) – Tom Daniels
- Lawrence of Arabia (1962) – Arab Sheik at Council (uncredited)
- Stranger in the House (1967) – Harry Hawkins
- A Challenge for Robin Hood (1967) – Friar Tuck
- Oliver! (1968) – Mr. Jessop
- The Flaxton Boys (1969) – Nathan
- Song of Norway (1970) – Butler to Berg
- The Horror of Frankenstein (1970) – Bailiff
- Scramble (1970) – (uncredited)
- The Firechasers (1971) – Inspector Herman
- The Blood on Satan's Claw (1971) – Squire Middleton
- Burke & Hare (1972) – Dr. Selby
- The Bawdy Adventures of Tom Jones (1976) – Briggs
