= If I Ruled the World =

Single by Harry Secombe

from the album Pickwick (Original Cast Album)
- B-side: "Look Into Your Heart"
- Released: 1963
- Length: 2:37
- Label: Philips Records
- Songwriters: Leslie Bricusse, Cyril Ornadel

Harry Secombe singles chronology
"Unforgiving Heart (Catari, Catari)" (1963)	"If I Ruled the World" (1963)	"That's What I'd Like for Christmas" (1963)

"If I Ruled the World" is a popular song composed by Leslie Bricusse and Cyril Ornadel which was originally from the 1963 West End musical Pickwick (based on Charles Dickens's The Pickwick Papers).

== Background ==
In the context of the stage musical, the song is sung by Samuel Pickwick, when he is mistaken for an election candidate and called on by the crowd to give his manifesto. Ornadel and Bricusse received the 1963 Ivor Novello award for Best Song Musically and Lyrically.

== First recordings ==
- The song is usually associated with Sir Harry Secombe, who got the song to No 18 in the UK charts in 1963.
- Tony Bennett originally recorded the song in 1965, and had a number 34 hit with it on the U.S. pop singles charts and number 8 on the Middle-Road Singles chart. In a duet with Celine Dion, he returned to the song on his Grammy-winning 2006 album Duets: An American Classic.
