= Jeremy Nicholas (writer) =

English actor and writer (born 1947)

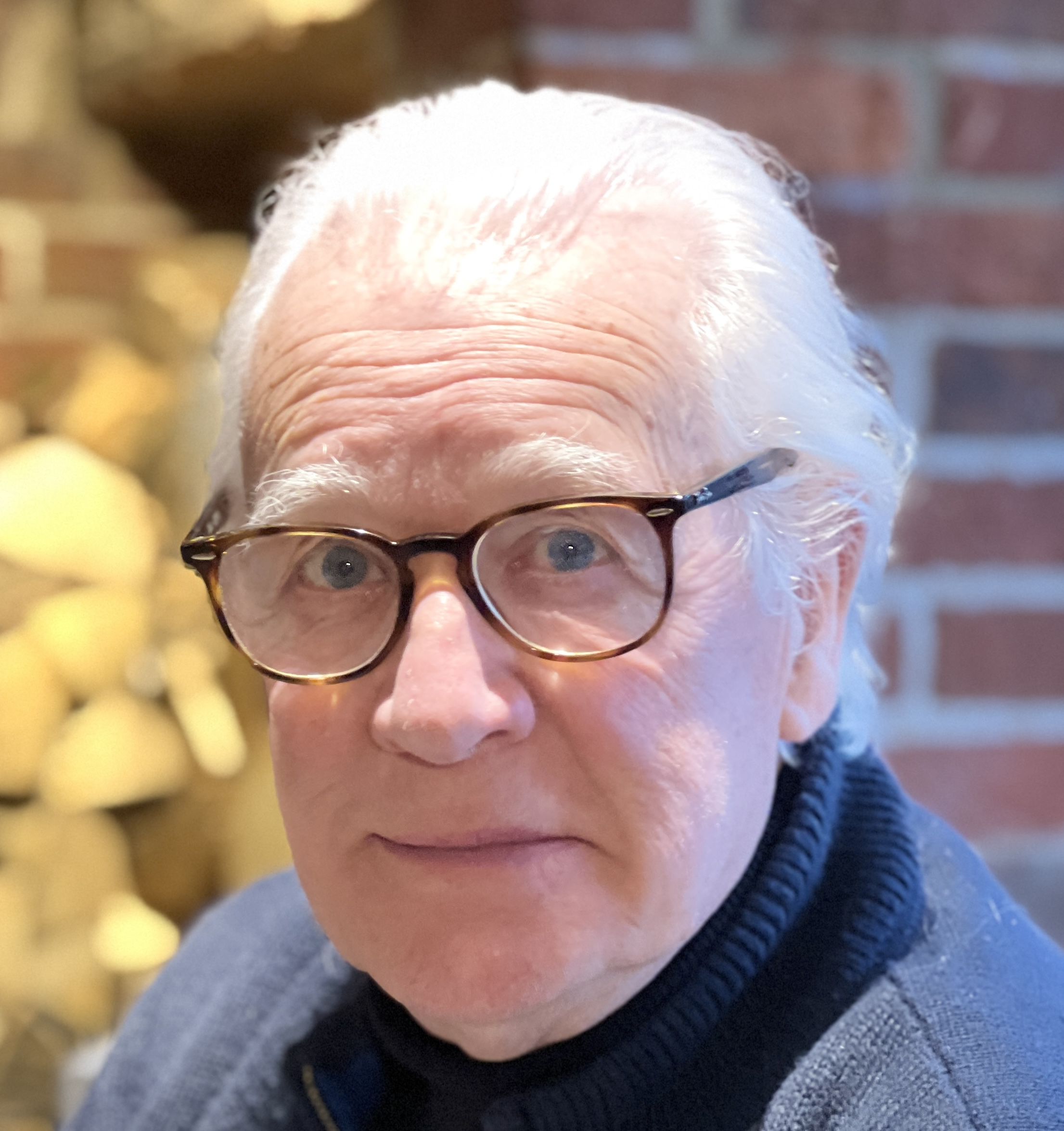
- Jeremy Nicholas in 2026
- Born: Jeremy Nicholas; 20 September 1947 (age 78); Wellington, Shropshire, England
- Occupations: Actor; writer; broadcaster; lyricist; musician.
- Years active: 1969 – present

Jeremy Nicholas (born 20 September 1947) is an English actor, writer, broadcaster, lyricist and musician.

== Early life ==
Born in Wellington, Shropshire, he was raised in Stafford and educated at Flash Ley Primary School, Stafford (1952–57); Wycliffe College in Gloucestershire (1957–65) and Birmingham School of Speech Training and Dramatic Art (1966–69).

Nicholas's first job between leaving school and going to drama college was as a trainee manager in Beatties department store in Wolverhampton (1965–66) from which he was sacked for rehearsing on the shop floor his lines for an amateur production. During his time at drama college he appeared in pantomime with Jimmy Jewel and Donald Peers, and survived a summer season as a Redcoat at Butlins Skegness.

== Actor ==
Nicholas began his career with the Prospect Theatre Company (1969–70) in Richard II and Edward II starring Ian McKellen and Timothy West. He then joined the Citizens Theatre (1970–72) for the first two seasons under the directorship of Giles Havergal, Philip Prowse and Robert David MacDonald. The first role he played there was Gertrude in an all-male production of Hamlet followed by The Player King in Rosencrantz and Guildenstern are Dead. Other parts included Butler in Edward Albee's Tiny Alice ('a lithe carnivorously affable reading by the most promising new actor I have seen this year'); Lord Foppington in The Relapse; Young Marlow in She Stoops to Conquer, Len in Saved and The Emperor in The Architect and the Emperor of Assyria.

He performed his own solo adaptation of Three Men in a Boat at the Edinburgh Festival (1980) and May Fair Theatre (1981–82), which won him a nomination for an Olivier Award as Most Promising Newcomer. He subsequently re-adapted the book for BBC Radio 4 and again for a Channel 4 film, as well as also adapting Jerome's Three Men on the Bummel for Radio 4. Other theatre roles include Narrator in Side by Side by Sondheim (Haymarket Theatre, Leicester); Jack Chesney in Charley's Aunt (York); Richard II in Circle of Glory (national tour); Lord Brocklehurst in The Admirable Crichton (Greenwich Theatre), Greg in Relatively Speaking opposite Dora Bryan and Moray Watson; Lenny in The Homecoming (directed by Timothy West); national tours of Beyond the Fringe as Dudley Moore (for Cameron Mackintosh); Canaries Sometimes Sing (with Diana Weston); An Ideal Husband (with Jeremy Sinden and Stephanie Turner) and Sir Peter Teazle in The School for Scandal (Derby and Nottingham).

Nicholas has also performed on television in roles such as Inigo Jollifant in The Good Companions, Nathaniel Winkle in The Pickwick Papers, John Maddingham in Crossroads, Sir Jonathan Sibley in Fay Weldon's Bright Smiler (1985) (with Janet Suzman and Jane Asher), Prospects (opposite David Suchet), The Upper Hand, Lewis Lake in Wish Me Luck, as well as voicing Lionel in all 39 episodes of Budgie the Little Helicopter. Other television appearances include roles in The Duchess of Duke Street, Z-Cars, When the Boat Comes In, the episodes 'Whispers' (1981) as Colin Thomas; 'Past Lives' (1982) as Peter Marshall; 'Work Force' (1984) as Vernon in Juliet Bravo, Rumpole of the Bailey, Heartbeat (1999), Birds of a Feather, The Bill and London's Burning. He played David Dimbleby in The Windsors (2016) opposite Harry Enfield. His film career has included roles in Sex and the Other Woman (1972), On the Game (1974), The Stud (1974), Turtle Diary (1985), Ishtar (1987) and Stanley's Dragon (1994).

He has presented and / or narrated many classical music concerts including Peter and the Wolf (2015), Francis Poulenc's Babar the Elephant, Façade, The Snowman, The Mousehole Cat, Mr Majeika and the Magic Organ, The King of Instruments (set to his own verses) and The Carnival of the Animals (1985), set to his own "eruditely witty and elegant new verses" and also those of Ogden Nash. In 2008 he became the first actor since Robert Donat in 1954 to give a live performance with orchestra of Alan Rawsthorne's Practical Cats (2009) with the BBC Concert Orchestra and broadcast on Radio 3. Since 2007 he has hosted and compiled the programme for the annual carol concert in Birmingham Town Hall.

From 1983 to 1991 Nicholas was 'the Baron' in a series of German and Austrian commercials for Ferrero Rocher chocolates. Also in 1983 he featured in an award-winning commercial for Hamlet cigars.

== Music ==
Nicholas has composed the music for several stage and television plays, among them Quartermaine's Terms as well as Random Moments in a May Garden (1981) and A Month in the Country (1985) for BBC Television. From 1977 to 1991 he wrote the lyrics and music for nearly 150 songs for BBC Radio 4's Stop the Week chaired by Robert Robinson. One of the UK's most authoritative writers on the piano and pianists, he has written four highly-acclaimed reference books on classical music, as well as biographies of Leopold Godowsky and Frédéric Chopin.

He has composed the scores for many stage plays – among them the British premiere of Tennessee Williams's Vieux Carré, and Sarah B. Divine, a musical about Sarah Bernhardt. His songs are published by Novello in two albums, Sarah's Encores and Funny You Should Sing That and which have been recorded by Sarah Walker and Roger Vignoles, and Jody Applebaum and Marc-André Hamelin. His instrumental works include Quiet Peace No. 1 which was recorded by duo-pianists Nettle & Markham); Blaythorne Suite and Lendalfoot for brass band were recorded by the Grimethorpe Colliery Band; Toccata giubiloso has been recorded by organist Kevin Bowyer, while his Toccata festiva was premiered by Thomas Trotter in Birmingham Town Hall in March 2012.

== Radio ==
Nicholas has written and presented over sixty radio features for BBC Radio. Their subject matter has ranged from the Shipping Forecast, the history of signature tunes, the lyricist Harry Graham, and the Vatican's Latin specialist Father Reginald Foster, to a series on the art of the comic song (Funny You Should Sing That) and the records played in the Light Programme's long-running request programme Children's Favourites (Hello Children…Everywhere). The latter resulted in a series of best-selling compilation albums for EMI which Nicholas curated. In 1996 he won a Sony Gold Award (Best Arts Programme) for England's Green and Pleasant Land, a two-hour celebration of England in verse, prose and music for BBC Radio 2. He has read and / or adapted more than twenty books for radio and spoken word recordings including Axel Munthe's The Story of San Michele and The Journal of a Disappointed Man by W. N. P. Barbellion. He played Dr. Watson to Peter Egan's Stamford Holmes in Second Holmes (1983), a BBC Radio 4 comedy six-part series following the adventures of the grandsons of Sherlock Holmes and Doctor Watson in contemporary England. In 2000 he dramatised and appeared in The Fast Gentleman by Keble Howard, also for Radio 4.

== Writer ==
His lifelong enthusiasm for comic verse led to his first book, Raspberries and Other Trifles (Hutchinson, 1984), a parody of Hilaire Belloc's Cautionary Tales for Children. He edited and published his collection of Limericks for the Connoisseur (New Generation, 2019) followed in 2025 by an expanded and illustrated edition entitled Limericks for the Unwoke, while in 2022 Porter Press issued What Larks, a volume of his collected verses and song lyrics. A regular contributor as critic and feature writer to Gramophone and International Piano, he has previously written for Classic FM Magazine, Classic CD, BBC Music Magazine, Piano and International Record Review. He is the author of four reference books on classical music and is the biographer of Leopold Godowsky and Frédéric Chopin. He has written over 130 classical CD booklets for all the major record labels. His latest book, The Great Piano Makers (Chiselbury, 2026) tells the stories of more than 100 famous makers from the giants of today to once popular brands.

== Other activities ==
Nicholas is President of the Jerome K. Jerome Society and was, from 2002 to 2021, music director of the Deanery Church of St Mary the Virgin in Braintree, Essex. He is an authority on the piano, pianists and Leopold Godowsky in particular.

== Personal ==
He is the eldest of four children adopted by Mary Cecilia Willson Woolcock (née White) (1909–2008), an interior design artist with Peter Jones before World War II; and Cleave Edward Woolcock (1910–1992), a chartered surveyor in the firm Barber & Woolcock which he co-founded and who served in the Royal Army Service Corps for six years throughout World War II before being demobbed in early 1946 with the rank of Major and resuming his former profession. Nicholas was adopted at the age of two months old and was named Jeremy Nicholas Woolcock.

He married Jill Elizabeth Rose in 1984 at St Paul's, Covent Garden (the 'Actors' Church') during filming for The Pickwick Papers. They have one child.

== Television ==
- Z-Cars (1973), Geff Devlin
- The Snow Queen (1974), Basin
- The Avenue (1977), Vincent Boyd-Thomson
- Rhinestone Cowboy (1979), Michael C Regan
- The Duchess of Duke Street (1977), Nick Somers
- The Good Companions (1979–80), Inigo Jollifant
- Echoes of Louisa (1980), Anthony
- Happy Endings (1981), Dr MacDonald and Badger
- When The Boat Comes In (1981), Frank Truett
- Juliet Bravo (1981–84)
- The Tale of Beatrix Potter (1982), Bertram Potter
- Three Men in a Boat (1982), 'J'
- Rumpole of the Bailey (1983), Jeremy Jowling
- The Pickwick Papers (1985), Nathaniel Winkle
- Bright Smiler (1985), Sir Jonathan Sibley
- Prospects (1985), Jocelyn Gummer
- Mog (1985), Tom Manners
- King and Castle (1986), Rodney Finch-Courtney
- Boon (1989), Tom
- Crime Story (1992), Hugh Rendell
- Stanley's Dragon (1993), Newspaper Editor
- London's Burning (1987), Berrington
- Crossroads (1988), John Maddingham
- Birds of a Feather (1990), Gerald
- The Upper Hand (1990), Simon Bellamy
- Wish Me Luck (1990), Lewis Lake aka Antoine
- Budgie the Little Helicopter (1994– 1996), Lionel (voice)
- Outside Edge (1994), Bob Willis
- Heartbeat (1999), Prof Talbot Booth
- Murder in Mind (2001), Mr Green QC
- The Windsors (2016), David Dimbleby
- In Seventh Heaven (Im siebten Himmel) (2020), Peter Bradley - a German-English co-production

== Bibliography ==
- Raspberries and Other Trifles – Tales for Discerning Delinquents (1984) ISBN 0-09-156780-7
- A Beginner's Guide to Opera (1993) ISBN 0-517-10324-9
- Funny You Should Sing That – The Songs of Jeremy Nicholas (1993) ISBN 0-85360-157-7
- Victorian Curiosities, editor (1995) ISBN 0-316-87587-2
- The Classic FM Guide to Classical Music (1996) ISBN 1-85793-760-0
- The Classic FM Good Music Guide (1999) ISBN 0-340-75042-1
- Chopin – His Life and Music (2006) ISBN 1-84379-115-3
- The Great Composers (2007) ISBN 1-84724-182-4
- Idle Thoughts on Jerome K Jerome, editor (2009) ISBN 978-0-9562212-0-9
- Godowsky – The Pianists' Pianist, 2nd ed. (2014) ISBN 978-1-84955-128-1
- Limericks for the Connoisseur, collected and edited (2019) ISBN 978-1-78955-416-8
- What Larks – Collected light verse and lyrics (2022) ISBN 978-1-913089-58-0
- Limericks for the Unwoke Chiselbury Publishing (2025) ISBN 978-1-916556-88-1
- The Great Piano Makers Chiselbury Publishing (2026) ISBN 978-1-917837-26-2

== Recordings ==
- Prokofiev: Peter and the Wolf. Czecho-Slovak Radio Symphony Orchestra, conductor Ondrej Lenárd, narrator Jeremy Nicholas. (Naxos Records 8.550499)
- Camille Saint-Saëns: Carnival of the Animals. David Nettle & Richard Markham, pianos (with ensemble). Verses written and narrated by Jeremy Nicholas. (Netmark NEMACD600)
- Francis Poulenc: Babar the Elephant. David Nettle & Richard Markham, pianos, Text by Jean de Brunhoff, narrator Jeremy Nicholas. (Netmark NEMACD600)
- Toccata Giubiloso. Kevin Bowyer, organ. (NPC007, Alto ALC1187, Forum 8103)
- Quiet Peace No.1 (arr. 2 pianos) David Nettle & Richard Markham, pianos (MCD 65, Carlton Classics 30366 01052, NEMACD200)
- Place Settings (words & music, Jeremy Nicholas) Sarah Walker & Roger Vignoles (Hyperion CDA66289, Helios CDH55422)
  - Musical Chairs (alternative version of Place Settings) (words & music, Jeremy Nicholas) Jody Karin Applebaum & Marc-André Hamelin (Albany TROY744)
- Usherette's Blues (words & music, Jeremy Nicholas) Sarah Walker & Roger Vignoles (Hyperion CDA66289, Helios CDH55422) Jody Karin Applebaum & Marc-André Hamelin (Albany TROY744) (TTB CD02)
- Pretty Plain (words & music, Jeremy Nicholas) Jody Karin Applebaum & Marc-André Hamelin (Albany TROY744)
- Maternity (words & music, Jeremy Nicholas) Jody Karin Applebaum & Marc-André Hamelin (Albany TROY744)
- Valentine Card (words & music, Jeremy Nicholas) Stewart Collins & Andy Read (FEST CD231)
- Blaythorne Suite (arr. Farr), Grimethorpe Colliery Band, conductor Ray Farr (PRL 004)
