= Second Holmes =

Second Holmes was a six-part BBC Radio 4 comedy series following the adventures of the grandsons of Sherlock Holmes and Doctor Watson in contemporary England. Stamford Holmes was played by Peter Egan and "Doctor" Watson by Jeremy Nicholas. The series was written by Grant Eustace and was broadcast in 1983.

Despite its billing as a comedy, the programme was very light in touch rather than slapstick and portrayed Holmes as idle and easily bored, clearly only doing any work as a consulting detective to provide Watson with material for the Sunday papers. Cases included an interesting murder by crossbow and a meeting with the grandson of Henry Baskerville. Writer Eustace had written other Holmes radio adaptations and pastiches, so was on familiar ground.
