= Nathaniel Winkle =

Fictional character in The Pickwick Papers

- The Pickwick Papers character
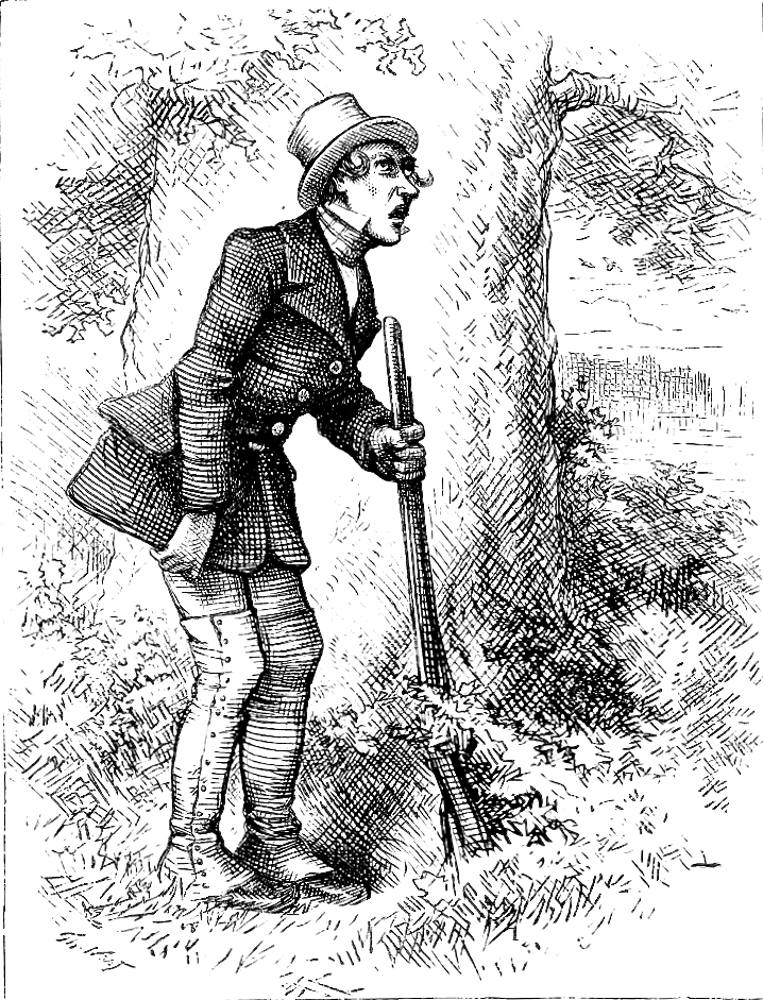
- Nathaniel Winkle by Thomas Nast (1873)
- Created by: Charles Dickens

In-universe information
- Gender: Male
- Nationality: English

Nathaniel Winkle is a fictional character in Charles Dickens's first novel, The Pickwick Papers (1836–37).

A founder and younger member of the Pickwick Club created by the retired businessman Samuel Pickwick, Winkle is a young friend of Pickwick's and, with Augustus Snodgrass and Tracy Tupman, his travelling companion. Although a city dweller Winkle considers himself an outdoor sportsman, though he turns out to be dangerously inept when handling horses and guns. His ineptitude, especially with guns, becomes a running joke throughout the novel.

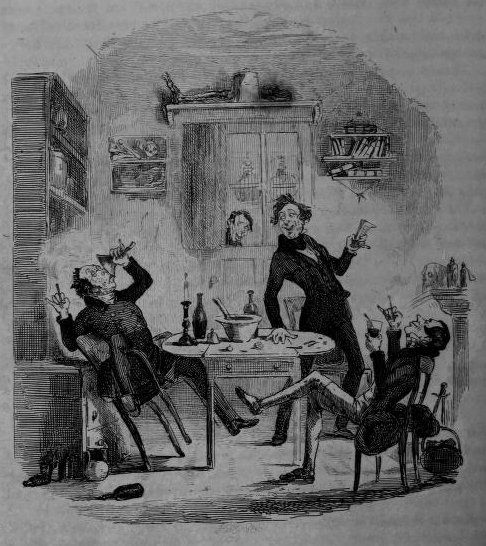
Mr. Winkle sups with Bob Sawyer. Illustration by Hablot Knight Browne (1836)

Aside from Mr Pickwick himself, Winkle is the most prominent and the most amusing of the Pickwickians. In the Preface to the first cheap edition of The Pickwick Papers (1847) Dickens wrote, "I connected Mr Pickwick with a club, because of the original suggestion [made by the publishers], and I put in Mr Winkle expressly for the use of Mr Seymour." Thus, the character of Winkle was introduced by Dickens into The Pickwick Papers as a nod to the original sporting theme of the novel as envisioned by Robert Seymour, the original illustrator. Seymour's idea was to create a magazine series of sporting illustrations with short written sketches linking them together around a 'Nimrod Club' of sporting people having adventures as the framework for his own sketches and illustrations.

As the Pickwick Papers evolved under the pen of Dickens, and after the suicide of Seymour, Dickens had other ideas about how the plot should develop with the sporting tales becoming fewer and fewer, with the exception of Winkle, who boasts about his hunting skills (despite having none). According to Mr Pickwick, "the desire of earning fame in the sports of the field, the air, and the water was uppermost in the breast of his friend Winkle". However, Winkle is frightened at the thought of having to fight a duel with Dr Slammer, an experienced Army officer; manages to fall off a horse; accidentally shoots fellow Club member Tracy Tupman in the arm while hunting fowl; cannot play cricket and cannot even ice skate. After Seymour subsequent illustrators have depicted Winkle in sporting gear, including Thomas Nast (above) in 1873 in which he drew Winkle standing with the loaded gun pointing at his head.

At the trial of Bardell v. Pickwick his unfortunate reference to the "trifling occasion" of Mr Pickwick's escapade at the Great White Horse Inn in Ipswich involving Miss Witherfield is highly damaging to Pickwick's case. When leaving the witness box and realising that he had made a blunder, Winkle "rushed with delirious haste to the George and Vulture, where he was discovered some hours after, by the waiter, groaning in a hollow and dismal manner, with his head buried beneath the sofa cushions."

Winkle is transformed when he finds happiness in his love for Arabella Allen and receives Pickwick's assistance in his courting of and eventual marriage to her, eloping with her despite strong opposition from Benjamin Allen, his bride's brother; from Bob Sawyer, his rival for her affections; and his own father. After his marriage Winkle finally finds the resolve to stand up to his stern father, stating: "I am sorry to have done anything which has lessened your affection for me ... but I have no reason to be ashamed of having this lady as my wife, nor you of having her for a daughter."

== Legacy ==
Winkle Island, lying between Tula Point and Pickwick Island, Pitt Islands, in the Biscoe Islands, was named by the United Kingdom Antarctic Place-Names Committee (UK-APC) in 1959 after Nathaniel Winkle.

== Notable portrayals ==
- William Carleton in The Pickwick Papers at Worrell Sisters' theatre on Broadway (1868)
- Louis Payne in Mr. Pickwick (1903) at the Herald Square Theatre and later the Grand Opera House
- Fred Hornby in The Pickwick Papers (1913 film)
- Arthur Cleave in The Adventures of Mr. Pickwick (1921 film)
- James Donald in The Pickwick Papers (1952 film)
- Desmond Walter-Ellis in Bardell v. Pickwick (1955 film)
- Ian Trigger in Pickwick (1969 film)
- Jeremy Nicholas in The Pickwick Papers (1985 TV series)
