= Frederick Volpe =

British actor (1865–1932)

Volpe in 1926

Frederick Volpe (31 July 1865 – 7 March 1932), sometimes printed Volpé, was an English actor. He made his stage debut in his early twenties. From 1894 until his death he was a familiar figure on the West End stage, generally in undemanding comedies and other ephemeral productions. Among others, he created the role of Alexis in The Girl in the Taxi (1913). He made several films, beginning in 1917.

== Life and career ==
Volpe was born in Liverpool, the son of Raffaele Volpe. He was educated at the Liverpool Institute High School for Boys (now the Liverpool Institute for Performing Arts), and made his stage debut in 1887 at Rhyl in north Wales. He first came to public prominence in 1894 when he appeared in The Gentleman Whip at Terry's Theatre, London, under the management of Weedon Grossmith. He remained a member of Grossmith's team for more than two years, appearing in The New Boy, The Ladies' Idol, Poor Mr. Potton and The Romance of the Shopwalker. For the rest of the century he played in light comedies and other ephemeral productions in the West End. In 1900 he visited America with E. S. Willard's company.

Between the turn of the century and the First World War, Volpe's roles included Pecksniff in Tom Pinch, based on Martin Chuzzlewit (1903), Lord Amersteth in a play based on the Raffles stories (1906), Paul Bultitude in a stage version of Vice Versa, and Alexis in The Girl in the Taxi (1913). Among his post-war roles were Chancellor Teppich in The Prisoner of Zenda (1923), Mr Cattermole in The Private Secretary (1923) and Sir Joshua Grimshaw in The Truth Game in a starry cast including Lily Elsie, Ivor Novello, Lilian Braithwaite, Viola Tree and Glen Byam Shaw (1928).

Volpe was married to the actress Alice Beet, whom he outlived by two months. He died at his home in Kew, Surrey aged 66.

== Partial filmography ==
- The Labour Leader (1917)
- Once Upon a Time (1918)
- The Adventures of Mr. Pickwick (1921)
- Lord Richard in the Pantry (1930)
- The Middle Watch (1930)
- Bed and Breakfast (1930)
- Captivation (1931)
