= Julian Orchard =

English comedy actor (1930–1979)

- Orchard in Revenge of the Pink Panther, 1978
- Born: Julian Dean Chavasse Orchard; 3 March 1930; Wheatley, Oxfordshire, England
- Died: 21 June 1979 (aged 49); Westminster, London, England
- Education: Shrewsbury School
- Alma mater: Guildhall School of Music and Drama.
- Occupation: Comedy actor

Julian Dean Chavasse Orchard (3 March 1930, in Wheatley, Oxfordshire – 21 June 1979, in Westminster, London) was an English comedy actor. He appeared in four Carry On films: Don't Lose Your Head (1966), Follow That Camel (1967), Carry On Doctor (1967), and Carry On Henry (1971).

== Career ==
Orchard was educated at Shrewsbury School and the Guildhall School of Music and Drama. He appeared as the flamboyant Duke of Montague, a cousin of Prince Edward, in the Cinderella film, The Slipper and the Rose (1976). He had a regular slot on Spike Milligan's The World of Beachcomber, a TV version of the "Beachcomber" pieces by J. B. Morton, appearing as the poet Roland Milk. His customary role was that of a gangling and effete – and sometimes effeminate – dandy.

He played Snodgrass in the TV musical Pickwick for the BBC in 1969, and appeared in several of the comedy Carry On films and the sex comedy Adventures of a Private Eye (1977).

He appeared on BBC television as the "Minister for the Arts" in the episode of The Goodies entitled "Culture for the Masses"; and as one of the "mechanicals" in a production of A Midsummer Night's Dream.

He played the deputy headmaster Mr Oliver Pettigrew in the TV series Whack-O! in 1971-72 (the role having been created by Arthur Howard in 1956–60).

He played Cornelius Button in the 1971 London Weekend Television children's serial Grasshopper Island as an eccentric grasshopper expert who had lived on Grasshopper Island for many years.

=== Theatre ===
He played the chamberlain Count Oscar "comically eloquent in every inch of his towering, supple figure" in the Sadler's Wells Opera production of Offenbach's Barbe-bleue (Blue-beard) in 1966. For the 1971 Christmas season Orchard starred, with Terry Scott, as an Ugly Sister, in the London Palladium's production of Cinderella; and the following year he again played the Dame, the nurse, in the London Palladium's pantomime, Babes in the Wood.

In 1974 he became a member of the National Theatre Company at the Old Vic, appearing in Peter Hall's debut production, The Tempest where he and Arthur Lowe played the comedy duo of Stephano and Trinculo to John Gielgud's Prospero.

== Death ==
Orchard died in hospital in Westminster, London, on 21 June 1979, following a short illness.

== Filmography ==
- The Great Van Robbery (1959) – Brady
- Three on a Spree (1961) – Walker
- Crooks Anonymous (1962) – 1st Jeweller
- Kill or Cure (1962) – PC Lofthouse
- On the Beat (1962) – Wedding Photographer (uncredited)
- A Stitch in Time (1963) – Man with Headache (uncredited)
- Father Came Too! (1964) – Bath Salesman
- Hide and Seek (1964) – Party Guest
- Comedy Workshop: Love and Maud Carver (1964) – His Lordship / Guards Officer
- Don't Lose Your Head (1966) – Rake (uncredited)
- The Spy with a Cold Nose (1966) – Policeman
- Stranger in the House (1967) – Policeman (uncredited)
- Carry On Follow That Camel (1967) – Doctor
- Carry On Doctor (1967) – Fred
- Half a Sixpence (1967) – Photographer
- The Magnificent Six and 1/2 (1968) – Employer
- Oliver! (1968)
- Can Heironymus Merkin Ever Forget Mercy Humppe and Find True Happiness? (1969) – Red Cardinal
- The Nine Ages of Nakedness (1969) – The Pharaoh (segment "The Egyptians")
- Futtocks End (1970) – The Twit
- Perfect Friday (1970) – Thompson
- Cucumber Castle (1970) – Julian the Lord Chamberlaine
- Carry On Henry (1971) – Duc de Poncenay
- Bless This House (1972) – Tom Hobbs
- Anoop and the Elephant (1972) – Mr. Skinner
- Man About the House (1974) – Producer
- The Adventure of Sherlock Holmes' Smarter Brother (1975) – Man in Tails
- The Slipper and the Rose (1976) – Montague
- Keep It Up Downstairs (1976) – Bishop
- Adventures of a Private Eye (1977) – Police Cyclist
- Crossed Swords (1977) – St.John
- Odd Man Out (1977) – Mr Bold
- Revenge of the Pink Panther (1978) – Hospital Clerk
- The London Connection (1979) – Driscoll
