= Cyril Ornadel =

British conductor, songwriter and composer (1924–2011)

- Born: Simon Cyril Ornadel; 2 December 1924; London, England
- Died: 22 June 2011 (aged 86); Israel
- Education: Royal College of Music
- Occupations: Conductor, songwriter and composer

Simon Cyril Ornadel (2 December 1924 – 22 June 2011) was a British conductor, songwriter and composer, chiefly in musical theatre. He worked regularly with David Croft, the television writer, director and producer, as well as Norman Newell and Hal Shaper. He was awarded the Gold Badge of Merit by the British Academy of Songwriters, Composers and Authors for services to British Music and won a total of four Ivor Novello Awards.

== Life and career ==
Simon Cyril Ornadel was born into a middle-class Jewish family in London, England, and studied at the Royal College of Music.

During the 1950s, he was famous for conducting the orchestra for the hit TV show Sunday Night at the London Palladium. This followed as a musical director for a number of major West End shows, including the first London production of My Fair Lady, and at the London Palladium the hit shows The Sound of Music and The King and I starring Yul Brynner.

He composed several musicals of his own, including Pickwick (1963, lyrics by Leslie Bricusse), starring Harry Secombe, from which came the hit song "If I Ruled the World", which won an Ivor Novello Award; Great Expectations (1975) starring John Mills, both adapted from Charles Dickens; and Treasure Island (1973), adapted from Robert Louis Stevenson and starring Bernard Miles and Spike Milligan. Great Expectations and Treasure Island (both with lyrics by Hal Shaper) were designated Best British Musical at the Ivor Novello Awards.

He also penned the song "Portrait of My Love" (lyrics by Norman Newell), a hit for Matt Monro in 1960, which also won the 1960 Ivor Novello award for Best Song Musically and Lyrically. "At My Time of Life" from Great Expectations was recorded by Bing Crosby in 1976.

Ornadel's contribution to music for television includes scores for the remake of Brief Encounter (1974) starring Richard Burton and Sophia Loren, Edward the Seventh (1975), which won a BAFTA, starring Timothy West as Edward VII, and the music for the British television science-fiction series Sapphire & Steel (1979). He also conducted music with the London Symphony Orchestra for The Strauss Family, by the eponymous composers, and was presented with a gold disc for sales.

A highlight of his career included conducting the London Symphony Orchestra at Wembley Arena with music from The Strauss Family in 1973. His film work included Some May Live (1967), Subterfuge (1968), Wedding Night (1970), Not Now Darling (1973), and many Pete Walker films including Man of Violence (1969), Cool It Carol! (1970), Die Screaming, Marianne (1971), The Flesh and Blood Show (1972) and Tiffany Jones (1973).

Ornadel's autobiography, Reach for the Moon, was published by the Book Guild in 2007.

Ornadel died on 22 June 2011, aged 86.

== Bibliography ==
- Bloom, Ken. American song. The Complete Musical Theater Companion. 1877–1995, Vol. 2, 2nd edition, Schirmer Books, 1996.
- Cummings, David M.; McIntire, Dennis K. (Ed.). International who's who in music and musician's directory. In the classical and light classical fields, Twelfth edition 1990/91, International Who's Who in Music 1991.
- Musicians' Union national directory of members 2001, 2nd edition, Musicians's Union, 2001.
