= Alfred Jingle =

Fictional character in The Pickwick Papers

- The Pickwick Papers character
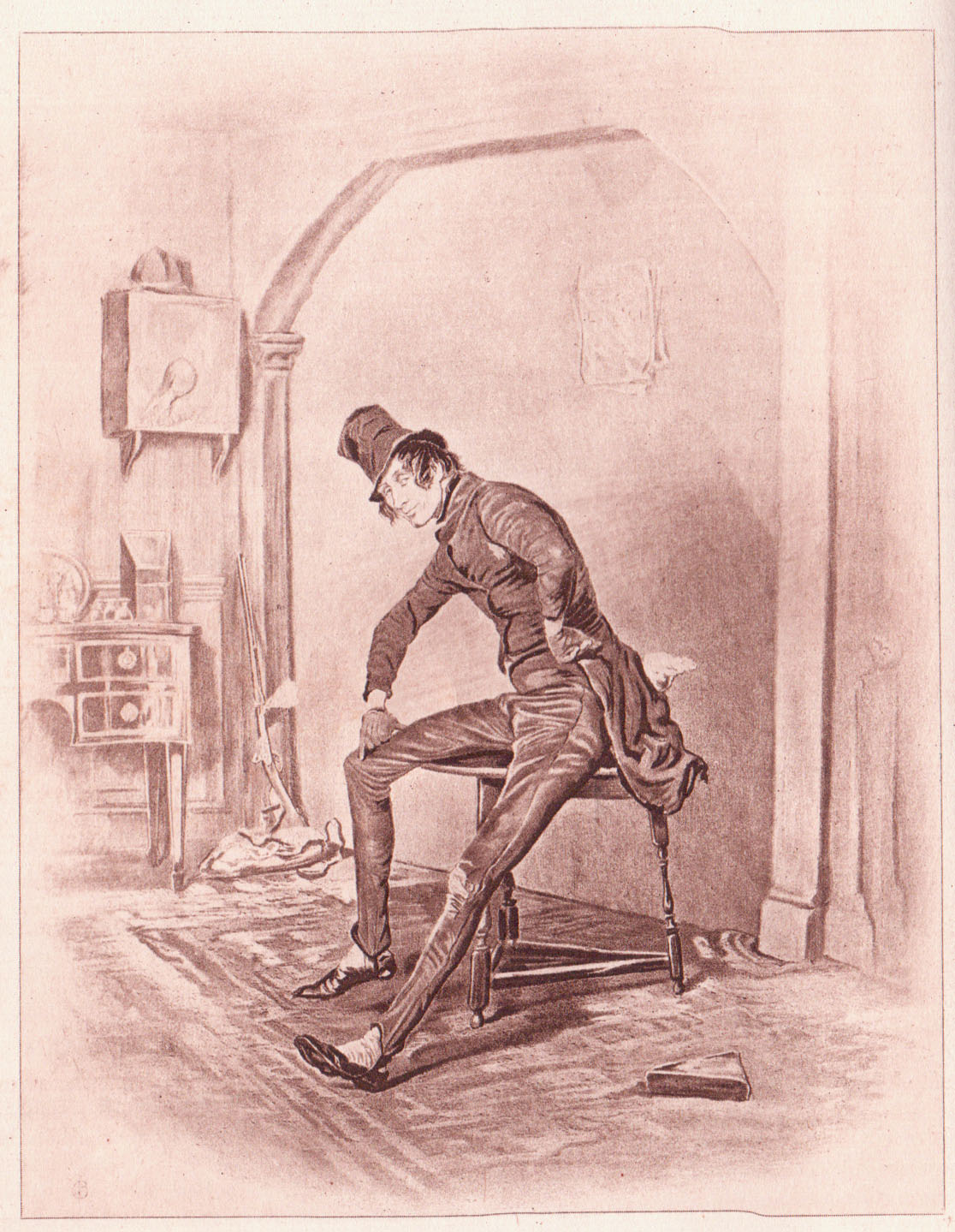
- Alfred Jingle by Fred Barnard
- Created by: Charles Dickens

In-universe information
- Gender: Male
- Occupation: Actor
- Nationality: English

Alfred Jingle is a fictional character who appears in the 1837 novel The Pickwick Papers by Charles Dickens. He is a strolling actor and an engaging charlatan and trickster noted for his bizarre anecdotes and distinctive mangling of English syntax.

He first appears in chapter two of the novel (called "the stranger") and accompanies the Pickwickians on their first coach journey. As they leave the Golden Cross Inn at Charing Cross, Jingle holds forth in characteristic mode on the dangers of decapitation as illustrated by low archways and the example of King Charles I, beheaded at nearby Whitehall Palace:

"Heads, heads - take care of your heads", cried the loquacious stranger as they came out under the low archway which in those days formed the entrance to the coachyard. "Terrible place – dangerous work – other day – five children – mother – tall lady, eating sandwiches – forgot the arch – crash – knock – children look round – mother's head off – sandwich in her hand – no mouth to put it in – head of family off – shocking, shocking. Looking at Whitehall Sir, – fine place – little window – somebody else's head off there, eh, Sir? – he didn't keep a sharp look-out either – eh, sir, eh?" (Pickwick Papers Chapter 2)

He usurps Pickwickian Tracy Tupman in the affections of Mr. Wardle's spinster sister, Rachael Wardle. Being only interested in her money, he elopes with her to London. Pickwick and Mr. Wardle pursue the couple to London where they pay off Jingle and rescue Rachael Wardle from an unhappy marriage.

After subjecting the Pickwickians to various tricks and affronts Jingle is pursued by them by coach from town to town. Eluding their grasp, he is eventually encountered by Mr Pickwick as a fellow resident of the Fleet Prison where Pickwick charitably bails him out and later arranges for him and his servant Job Trotter to pursue their fortune in the West Indies.
