= St. Christopher Island (Antarctica) =

Antarctic island

- Location within Antarctica Location within Antarctic Peninsula

Geography
- Location: Antarctica
- Coordinates: 66°14′58″S 67°07′16″W
- Archipelago: Biscoe Islands
- Area: 24 ha (59 acres)
- Length: 680 m (2230 ft)
- Width: 580 m (1900 ft)

Administration
- Administered under the Antarctic Treaty System

Demographics
- Population: uninhabited

St. Christopher Island (Bulgarian: остров Св. Христофор, romanized: ostrov Sv. Hristofor, IPA: [ˈɔstrof svɛˈti xristoˈfɔr]) is the mostly ice-covered island extending 680 m in southwest–northeast direction and 580 m in southeast–northwest direction lying in Papazov Passage, Biscoe Islands. Its surface area is 24 ha.

The feature is named after Saint Christopher (3rd century), the patron saint of travel-related occupations such as mariners.

== Location ==
St. Christopher Island is located at 66°14′58″S 67°07′16″W, which is 3 km southwest of Edholm Point on Krogh Island, 90 m northwest of Bona Mansio Island, 1 km northeast of the nearest point of DuBois Island and 1.86 km southeast of Talbott Point on the last island. British mapping in 1976.

== Maps ==
- British Antarctic Territory. Scale 1:200000 topographic map. DOS 610 Series, Sheet W 66 66. Directorate of Overseas Surveys, UK, 1976
- Antarctic Digital Database (ADD). Scale 1:250000 topographic map of Antarctica. Scientific Committee on Antarctic Research (SCAR). Since 1993, regularly upgraded and updated

== See also ==
- List of Antarctic and subantarctic islands
