= Bona Mansio Island =

Antarctic island

- Location within Antarctica Location within Antarctic Peninsula

Geography
- Location: Antarctica
- Coordinates: 66°15′06″S 67°06′25″W
- Archipelago: Biscoe Islands
- Area: 30 ha (74 acres)
- Length: 750 m (2460 ft)
- Width: 635 m (2083 ft)

Administration
- Administered under the Antarctic Treaty System

Demographics
- Population: uninhabited

Bona Mansio Island (Bulgarian: остров Бона Мансио, romanized: ostrov Bona Mansio, IPA: [ˈɔstrov ˈbɔnɐ ˈmansio]) is the ice-covered island extending 750 m (2,460 ft) in east–west direction and 635 m (2,083 ft) in south–north direction lying in Papazov Passage, Biscoe Islands. The island is separated from the west coast of Krogh Island by a 700 m-long (2,300 ft) passage narrowing to 50 m (160 ft) at points. Its surface area is 30 ha. The feature was formed as a result of the retreat of Krogh Island's ice cap around the turn of 21st century.

The island is named after the ancient Roman road station of Bona Mansio in Southern Bulgaria.

== Location ==
Bona Mansio Island is located at 66°15′06″S 67°06′25″W, which is 90 m (300 ft) east-southeast of St. Christopher Island, 2.55 km southeast of Talbott Point on DuBois Island and 2.55 km southwest of Edholm Point on Krogh Island.

== Maps ==
- British Antarctic Territory. Scale 1:200000 topographic map. DOS 610 Series, Sheet W 66 66. Directorate of Overseas Surveys, UK, 1976
- Antarctic Digital Database (ADD). Scale 1:250000 topographic map of Antarctica. Scientific Committee on Antarctic Research (SCAR). Since 1993, regularly upgraded and updated

== See also ==
- List of Antarctic and subantarctic islands
