= Clio Bay =

Antarctic bay

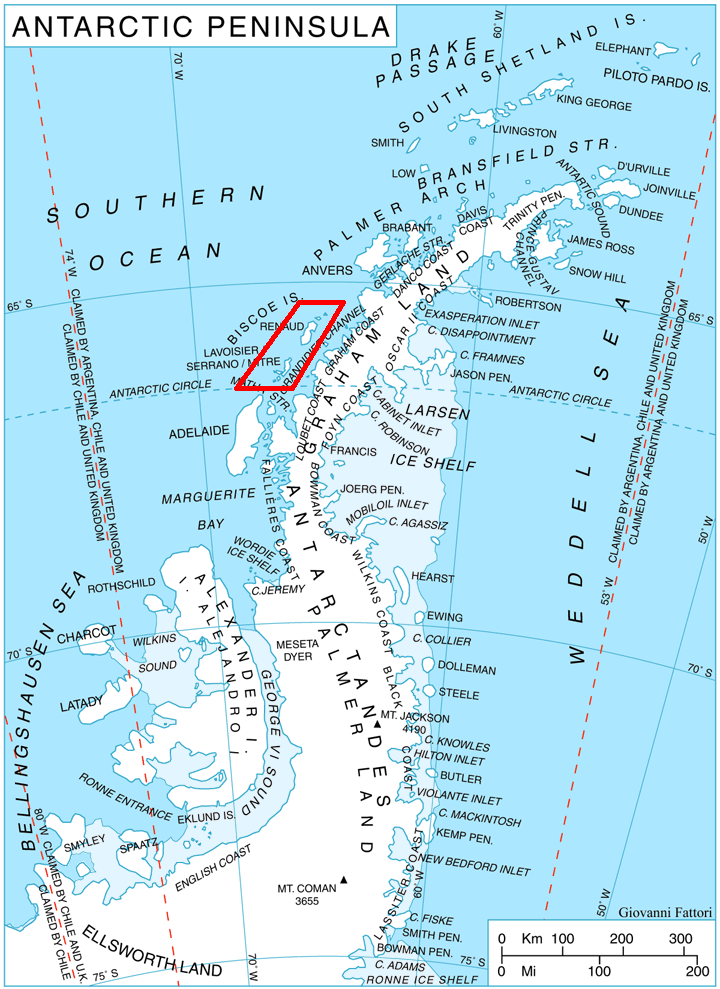
Location of Biscoe Islands in the Antarctic Peninsula region

Clio Bay (Bulgarian: залив Клио, romanized: zaliv Klio, IPA: [ˈzalif ˈklio]) is the 1.8 km wide bay indenting for 1.7 km the west coast of Lavoisier Island in Biscoe Islands, Antarctica. It is formed as a result of the retreat of Lavoisier Island's ice cap in the early 21st century.

The feature is named after Clio, the muse of history in Greek mythology.

== Location ==
Clio Bay is centred at 66°07′55″S 66°46′25″W, which is 5 km south-southwest of Newburgh Point and 1.8 km north-northeast of Metis Island. British mapping in 1976.

== Maps ==
- British Antarctic Territory. Scale 1:200000 topographic map. DOS 610 Series, Sheet W 66 66. Directorate of Overseas Surveys, UK, 1976
- Antarctic Digital Database (ADD). Scale 1:250000 topographic map of Antarctica. Scientific Committee on Antarctic Research (SCAR). Since 1993, regularly upgraded and updated
