= Metis Island =

Antarctic island

- Location within Antarctica Location within Antarctic Peninsula

Geography
- Location: Antarctica
- Coordinates: 66°08′53″S 66°47′37″W
- Archipelago: Biscoe Islands
- Area: 8.4 ha (21 acres)
- Length: 820 m (2690 ft)
- Width: 140 m (460 ft)

Administration
- Administered under the Antarctic Treaty System

Demographics
- Population: uninhabited

Metis Island (Bulgarian: остров Метис, romanized: ostrov Metis, IPA: [ˈɔstrof ˈmɛtis]) is the 820 m long in east–west direction and 140 m wide rocky island separated from the west coast of Lavoisier Island in Biscoe Islands by a 540 m wide passage. Its surface area is 8.4 ha.

The feature is named after Metis, a deity of wisdom and deep thought in Greek mythology.

== Location ==
Metis Island is located at 66°08′53″S 66°47′37″W, which is 6.8 km south-southwest of Newburgh Point and 12.35 km northeast of Zagrade Point on Krogh Island.

== Maps ==
- British Antarctic Territory. Scale 1:200000 topographic map. DOS 610 Series, Sheet W 66 66. Directorate of Overseas Surveys, UK, 1976
- Antarctic Digital Database (ADD). Scale 1:250000 topographic map of Antarctica. Scientific Committee on Antarctic Research (SCAR). Since 1993, regularly upgraded and updated

== See also ==
- List of Antarctic and subantarctic islands
