= Doncho =

Doncho is a Bulgarian and Macedonian masculine given name in use in Bulgaria and North Macedonia as a diminutive form of Andon. Notable people with this name include the following.

== Given names ==
- Doncho Atanasov (born 1983), Bulgarian footballer
- Doncho Donchev (born 1974), Bulgarian artist and illustrator
- Doncho Donev (born 1967), Bulgarian footballer
- Doncho Papazov (born 1939), Bulgarian oceanographer, adventurer and journalist
- Doncho Zhekov (born 1952), Bulgarian wrestler

== See also ==
- Donchō the Japanese form of Damjing, which is the Korean name of a 7th-century Buddhist priest
