= Kuvikal Point =

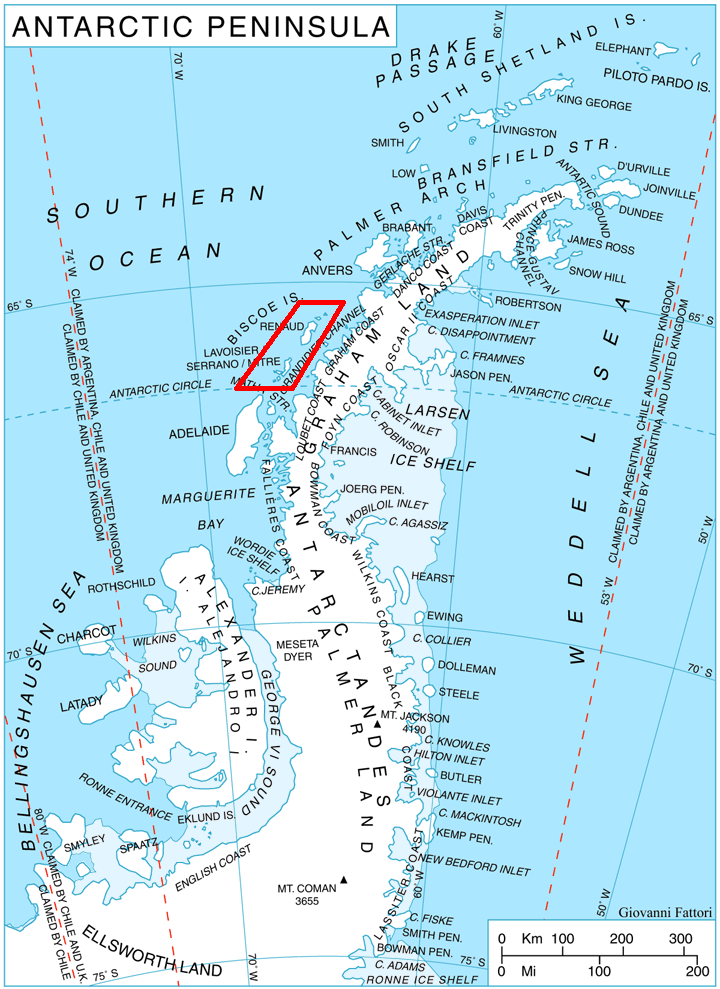
Location of Biscoe Islands in the Antarctic Peninsula region.

Kuvikal Point (Bulgarian: нос Кувикъл, ‘Nos Kuvikal’ \'nos 'ku-vi-k&l\) is the point on the east side of the entrance to Transmarisca Bay and the west side of the entrance to Suregetes Cove on the north coast of Krogh Island in Biscoe Islands, Antarctica. The eponymous group of small Kuvikal Islands, centred off the point at 66°14′50″S 66°57′40″W, extends 2 km (1.2 mi) in southwest-northeast direction and 2 km (1.2 mi) in south-southeast to north-northwest direction.

The point is named after Kuvikal Peak in the Rhodope Mountains, Bulgaria.

== Location ==
Kuvikal Point is located at 66°15′12.7″S 66°58′09″W, which is 4.3 km (2.7 mi) east-southeast of Edholm Point and 4.1 km (2.5 mi) west of Burton Point. It first appeared in British mapping in 1976.

== Maps ==
- British Antarctic Territory. Scale 1:200000 topographic map. DOS 610 Series, Sheet W 66 66. Directorate of Overseas Surveys, UK, 1976.
- Antarctic Digital Database (ADD). Scale 1:250000 topographic map of Antarctica. Scientific Committee on Antarctic Research (SCAR). Since 1993, regularly upgraded and updated.
