= Zagrade Point =

Geographic feature in Antarctica

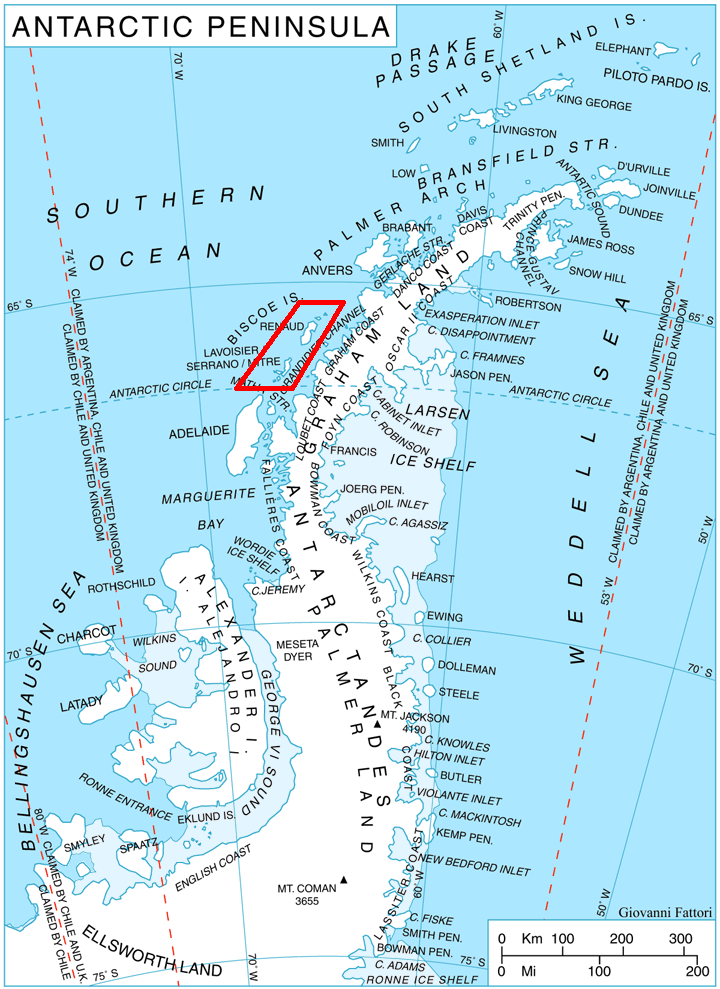
Location of Biscoe Islands in the Antarctic Peninsula region.

Zagrade Point (Bulgarian: нос Заграде, ‘Nos Zagrade’ \'nos za-'gra-de\) is the point on the east side of the entrance to Suregetes Cove on the north coast of Krogh Island in Biscoe Islands, Antarctica.

The point is named after the historical settlement of Zagrade in Southwestern Bulgaria.

== Location ==
Zagrade Point is located at 66°14′58″S 66°54′55″W, which is 2.47 km east-northeast of Kuvikal Point and 1.98 km northwest of Burton Point. British mapping in 1976.

== Maps ==
- British Antarctic Territory. Scale 1:200000 topographic map. DOS 610 Series, Sheet W 66 66. Directorate of Overseas Surveys, UK, 1976.
- Antarctic Digital Database (ADD). Scale 1:250000 topographic map of Antarctica. Scientific Committee on Antarctic Research (SCAR). Since 1993, regularly upgraded and updated.
