= Saint Christopher (disambiguation) =

Saint Christopher is a legendary figure venerated by several Christian denominations as a martyr and saint.

Saint Christopher or St. Christopher may also refer to:

- Saint Christopher of Trebizond, a seventh century saint venerated in Eastern Orthodoxy
- Saint Christopher island or Saint Kitts, an island in the Leeward Islands
- Saint Christopher (after van Eyck), a lost 15th-century painting by Jan van Eyck
- Saint Christopher (novella), a 1912 posthumous novella by José Maria de Eça de Queirós
- Saint Christopher (yacht), New Zealand's largest flagged private yacht
- HMS St Christopher, a ship and a shore establishment of the Royal Navy
- St. Christopher (band), a British pop band
- St. Christopher Island (Antarctica), an island in the Biscoe Islands of Antarctica
- St. Christopher, an album by Peter Capaldi
- Christopher Saint Booth, a musician and horror film director

== See also ==
- Hang On St. Christopher, a single by Tom Waits
