= Edholm =

Edholm may refer to:

- Edholm (surname), including a list of people with the name
- Edholm, Nebraska, United States

== See also ==
- Edholm Point, a headland in Antarctica
- Edholm's law
