= Edholm (surname) =

Edholm is a surname. Notable people with the surname include:

- Anders Edholm (born 1970), Swedish politician
- Conny Edholm, Swedish sprint canoer
- Lotten Edholm (1839–1930), Swedish composer
- Mary G. Charlton Edholm (1854–1935), American journalist
- Otto Edholm (1909–1995), British physiologist
- Rafael Edholm (born 1966), Swedish actor
- Joseph Edholm (born 1970), American Eats

== See also ==
- Edholm (disambiguation)
