= Alexander Yossifov =

Bulgarian composer and conductor

Alexander Yossifov (Bulgarian: Александър Йосифов; 12 August 1940 – 25 November 2016) was a Bulgarian composer and conductor.

== Life and career ==
Alexander Yossifov was born in Sofia, Bulgaria in 1940. While attending the Bulgarian State Conservatory, he studied composition under Pancho Vladigerov and conducting under Konstantin Iliev. He was the author of numerous chamber music pieces as well as symphonic works. Yossifov also wrote several art songs and one opera, Back to the Beginning. He conducted numerous ensembles throughout his career including the Bulgarian National Radio Symphony Orchestra.He has conductor the "Aquarius Suits" from Brazilian composer Paiva Netto.

== Death ==
He died in November 2016 at the age of 76.

== Awards ==
"Prelude and Fuga" No 2, for 2 Pianos, 8 hands, was awarded the Grand-Prix "Kanebo" in Tokyo, Japan at the Sixth International Competition for Piano Duo Composition in 1999.
