= Lewis Sound =

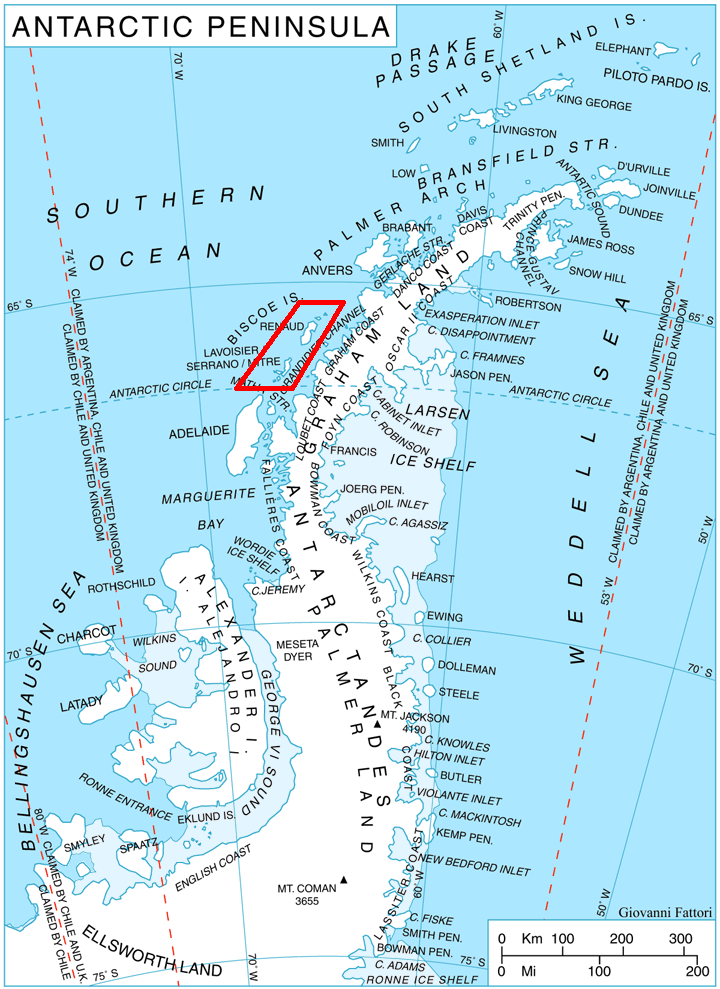
Location of Biscoe Islands in the Antarctic Peninsula region.

Lewis Sound (66°20′S 67°0′W) is a body of water running northwest–southeast between Lavoisier Island and Krogh Island to the northeast and Watkins Island to the southwest, in the Biscoe Islands of Antarctica. It was mapped from aerial photographs taken by the Falkland Islands and Dependencies Aerial Survey Expedition, 1956–57. In association with the names of pioneers in cold climate physiology grouped in this area, it was named "Lewis Passage" by the UK Antarctic Place-Names Committee (1960) after Sir Thomas Lewis, an English physiologist who investigated the responses of the blood vessels of the skin to environmental temperature. The feature was later renamed as Lewis Sound as it does not provide safe passage for a ship.
