= Transmarisca Bay =

Bay in Antarctica

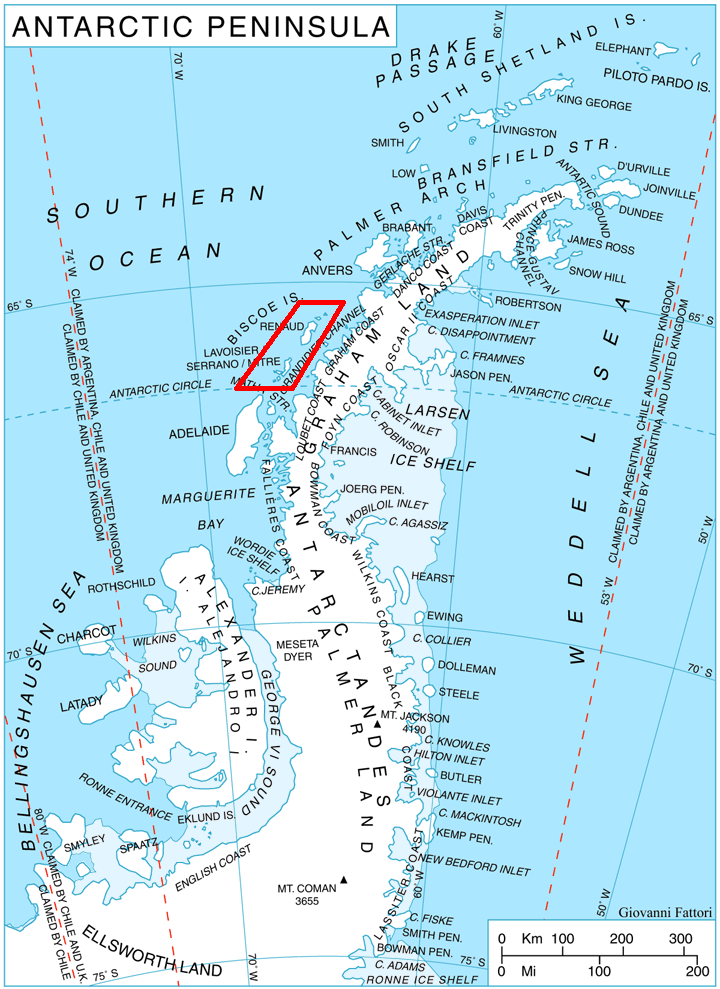
Location of Biscoe Islands in the Antarctic Peninsula region.

Transmarisca Bay (Bulgarian: залив Трансмариска, ‘Zaliv Transmarisca’ \'za-liv trans-ma-'ri-ska\) is the 4.3 km wide bay indenting for 3.2 km the north coast of Krogh Island in Biscoe Islands, Antarctica. It is entered east of Edholm Point and west of Kuvikal Point.

The bay is named after the ancient Roman town of Transmarisca in Northeastern Bulgaria.

== Location ==
Transmarisca Bay is centred at 66°15′10″S 67°02′00″W. British mapping in 1976.

== Maps ==
- British Antarctic Territory. Scale 1:200000 topographic map. DOS 610 Series, Sheet W 66 66. Directorate of Overseas Surveys, UK, 1976.
- Antarctic Digital Database (ADD). Scale 1:250000 topographic map of Antarctica. Scientific Committee on Antarctic Research (SCAR). Since 1993, regularly upgraded and updated.
