= Burton Point =

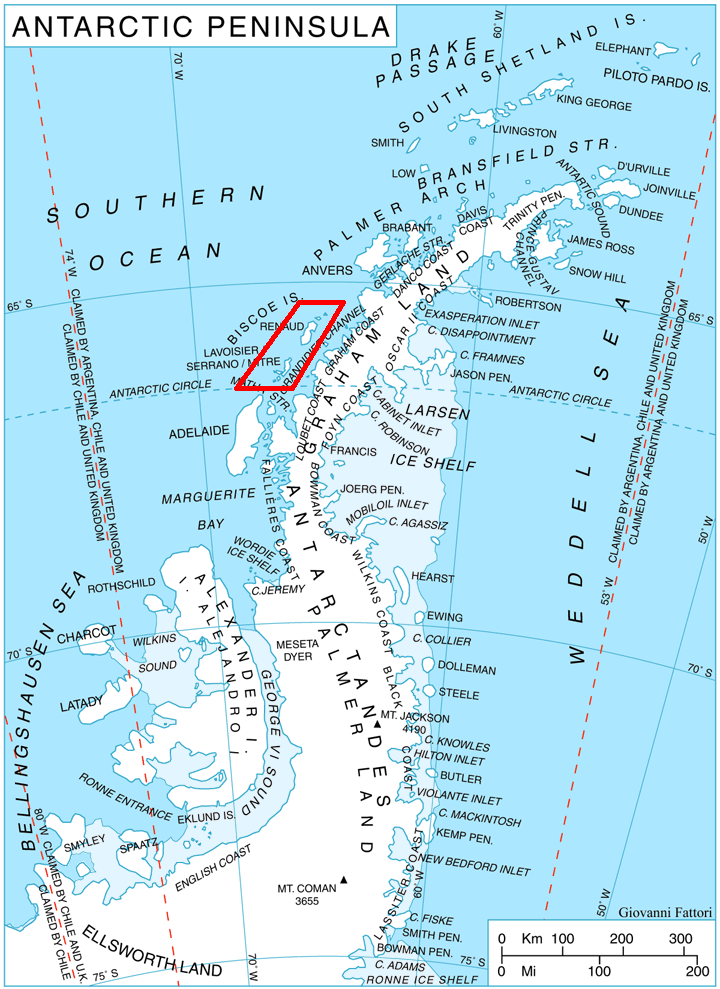
Location of Biscoe Islands in the Antarctic Peninsula region.

Burton Point (66°15′36″S 66°52′47″W) is the northeastern point of Krogh Island in the Biscoe Islands, Antarctica forming the north side of the northeast entrance to Vladigerov Passage.

The point was mapped from air photos taken by the Falkland Islands and Dependencies Aerial Survey Expedition (1956–57), and named by the UK Antarctic Place-Names Committee for Alan C. Burton, Canadian physiologist who has specialized in cold climate physiology and the problems of clothing for cold environments.
