= San Cristobal Island (disambiguation) =

San Cristobal Island (Spanish: Isla San Cristóbal, "St. Christopher Island") typically refers to one of the Galapagos Islands in Ecuador.

It may also refer to:

- Makira, formerly San Cristóbal, the largest island of Makira-Ulawa Province in the Solomon Islands
- Saint Kitts, known in Spanish as San Cristóbal

== See also ==
- Saint Christopher Island (disambiguation)
- Cristóbal Island, an island in the Bocas del Toro archipelago in Panama
