= Savage Club =

London gentlemen's club founded in 1857

Coordinates: 51°30′22″N 0°07′27″W

- Formation: 1857
- Type: Gentlemen's club
- Location: 27 Great Queen Street, London WC2B 5BB
- Website: www.savageclub.com

The Savage Club is a gentlemen's club in London which was founded in 1857. It is named after the poet Richard Savage. Members are drawn from the fields of art, drama, law, literature, music, and science.

== History ==
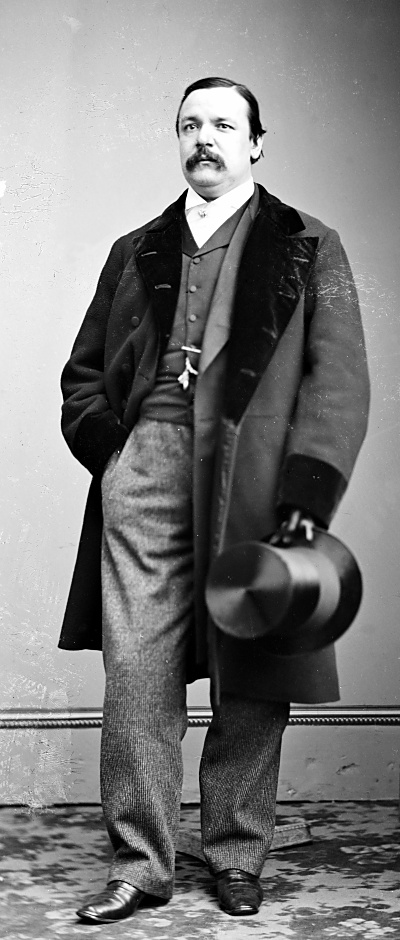
George Augustus Sala (ca. 1860) sent out the invitation letters to the founding meeting of the club in 1857.

=== Founding ===
The founding meeting of the Savage Club took place on 12 October 1857, at the Crown Tavern, Vinegar Yard, Drury Lane, after a letter by pro tempore honorary secretary George Augustus Sala was sent to prospective members. The letter advised it would be 'a meeting of gentlemen connected with literature and the fine arts, and warmly interested in the promotion of Christian knowledge, and the sale of exciseable liquors' with a view to 'forming a social society or club'. The inaugural gathering would also decide upon the new association's 'suitable designation'.

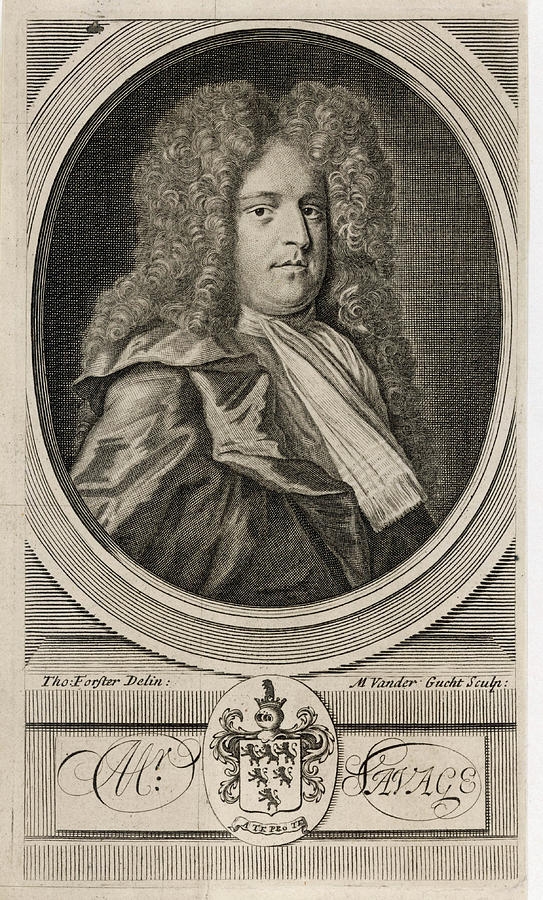
Richard Savage, poet (c. 1697 – 1743)

Around 20 attended the first meeting, including William Brough, Robert Brough, Leicester Silk Buckingham, John Deffett Francis, Gustav von Franck, William Bernhardt Tegetmeier, and Gustave Louis Maurice Strauss.

Andrew Halliday, joint honorary secretary in 1858, and later club president, wrote in his 1867 anthology of how the 'suitable designation' was determined:

'When about a dozen of the original members were assembled in the place selected for their meetings, it became a question what the Club should be called. Every one in the room suggested a title. One said the "Addison", another the "Johnson", a third the "Goldsmith", and so forth; and at last, after we had run the whole gamut of famous literary names of the modern period, a modest member in the corner suggested "The Shakespeare". This was too much for the gravity of one of the company (the late Mr Robert Brough) whose keen sense of humour enabled him, in the midst of our enthusiasm, to perceive that we were bent on making ourselves ridiculous. "Who are we," he said, "that we should take these great names in vain? Don't let us be pretentious. If we must have a name, let it be a modest one — one that signifies as little as possible." Hereupon a member called out, in a pure spirit of wantonness, "The Savage". That keen sense of humour was again tickled. "The very thing!" he exclaimed. "No one can say that there is anything pretentious in assuming that name. If we accept Richard Savage as our godfather, it shows that there is no pride about us." And so, in a frolicsome humour, our little society was christened the "Savage Club".'

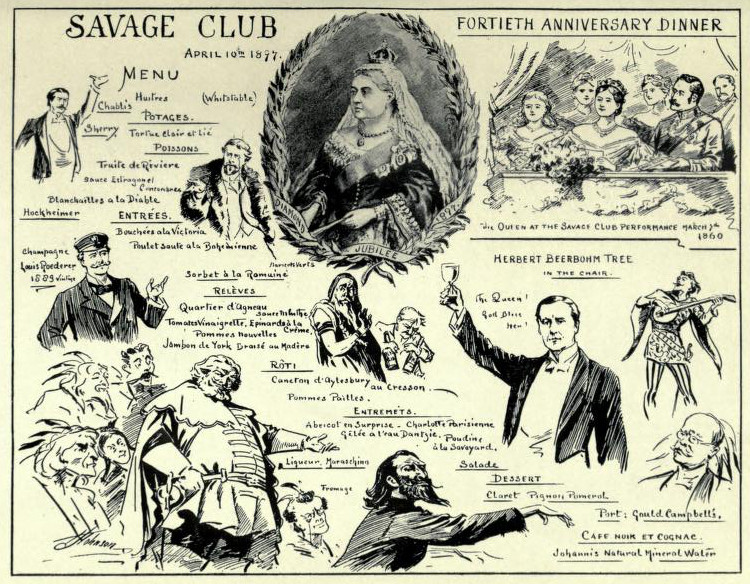
Menu card for the Savage Club's 40th anniversary dinner in 1897

=== Character ===
Many of the original members were drawn from the ranks of bohemian journalists and writers for The Illustrated London News who considered themselves unlikely to be accepted into the older, arts related Garrick Club, but, within two decades, the Savage Club itself had become 'almost respectable'. The early requirement – 'a working man in literature or art' – was soon broadened to include musicians, and the club's first piano was hired in 1871, prompting Halliday to tell another member 'Hang your piano... it's ruining the Club'. An associated Masonic lodge was established in 1887.

=== Premises ===
The club moved from its original home at the Crown Tavern, the next year to the Nell Gwynne Tavern. In 1863 it moved to Gordon's Hotel in Covent Garden, then to 6–7 Adelphi Terrace, later to 9 Fitzmaurice Place, Berkeley Square, London W1, and, from 1936 to the end of 1963, Carlton House Terrace in St James's (previously the home of the Conservative statesman Lord Curzon). In 1990, the club moved to a room within the National Liberal Club at 1 Whitehall Place, London SW1, and in 2025 the club opened at dedicated premises at 27 Great Queen Street, London WC2, back in Covent Garden.

=== Guests and references ===
The club has hosted a variety of guests over the years including American writer and humorist Mark Twain, and the Australian cricket team during its 1934 English tour. In the aftermath of World War II, Oswald Mosley, founder of the British Union of Fascists, arrived as a guest of Henry Williamson, author of Tarka the Otter, but was asked to leave.

The club features in Arthur Conan Doyle's classic novel, The Lost World.

== The club today ==
=== Events and reciprocals ===
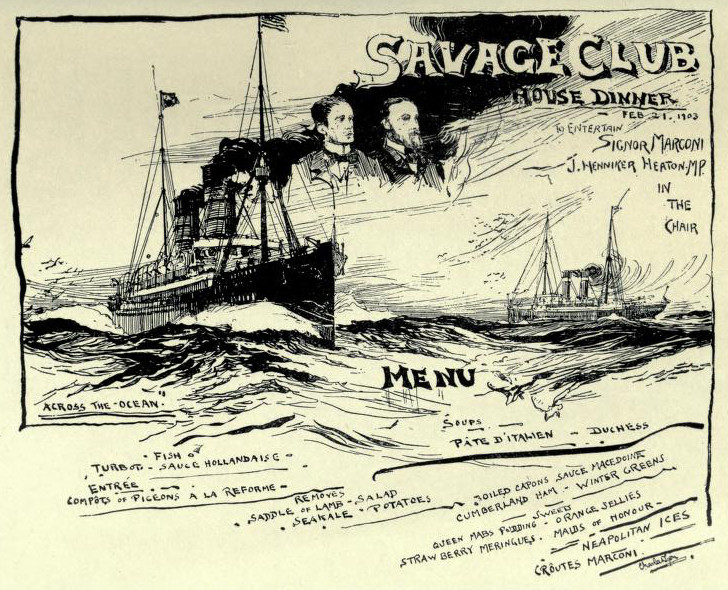
Menu card for a dinner in honour of the inventor of the radio, Guglielmo Marconi, in 1903

The club maintains a tradition of regular dinners for members and their guests, always followed by entertainment, often featuring distinguished musical performers from the club's membership. Several times a year members invite ladies to share both the dinner and the entertainment, and on these occasions guests always include widows of former Savages, who are known as Rosemaries (after rosemary, a symbol of remembrance). There are also monthly lunches, which are followed by a talk given by a member or an invited guest on a subject of which he has specific expert knowledge.

During the weekend, members are permitted to use the East India Club in St James's Square and the Oxford and Cambridge Club in Pall Mall. There are also reciprocal arrangements with other clubs internationally. Members of the Savage Club may also use accommodation at the Savile, Farmers and Lansdowne Clubs.

=== Membership ===
In 1962, the club had around 1,000 members. It remains one of the small number of London clubs that does not admit women as members, although women are admitted as guests. Members are classified into one of six categories which best describes their main interest: art, drama, law, literature, music or science. They must be proposed and seconded by two existing members, and if unknown by any other members, are required to attend a club function in order to meet some members. The category of membership might mirror a member's profession, though there are many members with an interest in one or more of the membership categories, but who practise none professionally. There is a range of membership fees depending on membership category.

== Notable members ==
Actors/Dramatists

- Arthur Askey
- Charles Spencer Chaplin (Charlie Chaplin)
- Albert Chevalier
- Robert Courtneidge
- Most of the members of The Crazy Gang
- Augustin Daly
- Bud Flanagan
- W. S. Gilbert
- Tommy Handley and the cast of It's That Man Again (ITMA)
- Jack Hawkins
- Will Hay
- Stanley Holloway
- Henry Irving
- Alfred Leete
- Arthur Lucan, aka Old Mother Riley
- Arnold Ridley
- Harry Secombe
- Herbert Beerbohm Tree
- Tommy Trinder
- Stanley Unwin
- Peter Ustinov
- Wee Georgie Wood (music hall comedian)
- Charles Wyndham
- Oswald Yorke actor

Artists

- Edward John Cobbett
- Bernard Walter Evans
- Walter Goodman
- John Hassall (illustrator)
- David Low (Colonel Blimp)
- Phil May
- Arthur Moreland
- Bertram Prance
- John Proctor
- Heath Robinson
- E. H. Shepard
- George Loraine Stampa
- James McNeill Whistler
- Lewis Pinhorn Wood
- John Worsley

Authors/Journalists

- James Agate
- J. M. Barrie
- Collin Brooks
- Samuel Langhorne Clemens (Mark Twain)
- Mortimer Collins
- Wilkie Collins
- Richard Davey
- George Grossmith
- Weedon Grossmith
- Macdonald Hastings
- A. P. Herbert
- Tom Hood
- Keble Howard
- C.E.M. Joad panellist on The Brains Trust
- Sidney Kilner Levett-Yeats
- Mark Lemon (Editor of Punch)
- W. Somerset Maugham
- E. Phillips Oppenheim
- Robert Young Pelton
- Dante Rossetti
- Rafael Sabatini
- George Augustus Sala
- Dylan Thomas
- Charles John Tibbits
- Edgar Wallace
- Artemus Ward
- Alec Waugh
- Henry Williamson
- Hugh Ross Williamson
- P. G. Wodehouse

Musicians

- Norman Allin
- Richard Arnell
- Alfred Louis Bacharach
- George Baker
- A. H. Behrend
- Webster Booth
- Alan Civil
- Edward Elgar
- Herman Finck
- Dan Godfrey
- Charles Groves
- Mark Hambourg (pianist)
- Alex James
- Gwynn Parry Jones
- Malcolm McEachern ('Mr Jetsam')
- Charles Millward
- Benno Moiseiwitsch
- Norman O'Neill
- Sergei Rachmaninov
- Carl Rosa
- Leonard Salzedo
- Charles Santley
- Edward White
- Henry Wood (conductor)

Scientists

- Alfred Louis Bacharach
- Alexander Fleming
- Brian J. Ford
- R. G. W. Norrish
- Magnus Pyke
- Robert Wilfred Scarff
- Peter Underwood

Other

- Hal Pateshall Colebatch
- Lord Denning
- King Edward VII
- C. B. Fry
- King George V
- King George VI
- Evan Rowland Jones
- Lord Kitchener
- Earl Mountbatten
- Fridtjof Nansen
- Prince Philip, Duke of Edinburgh
- Captain Scott

== The Savage Club Masonic Lodge ==
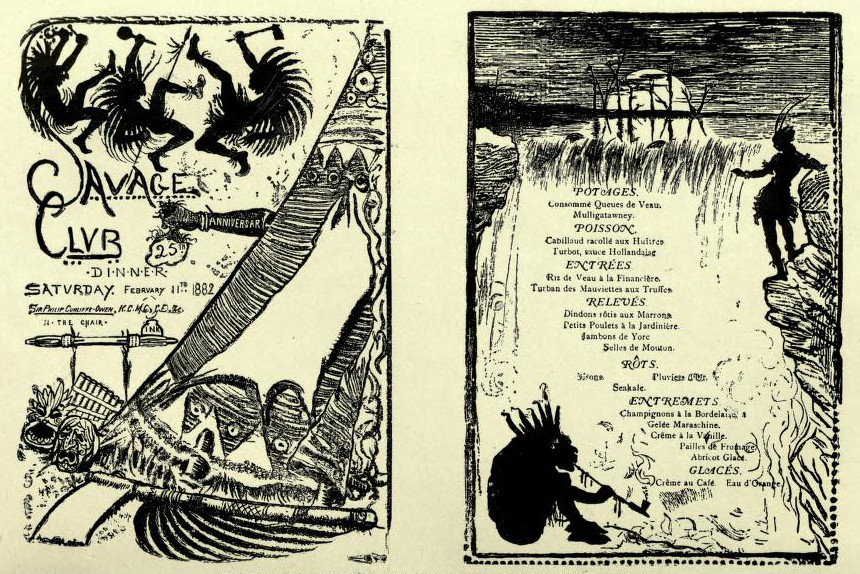
Menu card for a dinner in honour of the Prince of Wales (later Edward VII) in 1882

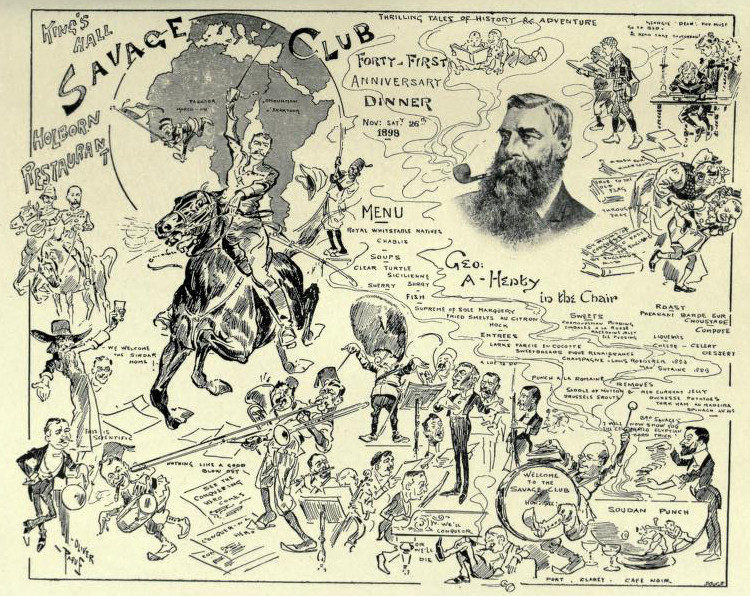
Menu card for a dinner in honour of Lord Kitchener of Khartoum in 1898

On 11 February 1882, the Prince of Wales (later Edward VII), attended a dinner in his honour at the Savage Club, before becoming a member. The Prince suggested a Masonic lodge, associated with the club, should be formed.

The Savage Club Lodge, No. 2190 received its Warrant of Constitution on 18 December 1886, and was consecrated on 18 January 1887, with war correspondent Sir John Richard Sommers Vine as the first Master. The first treasurer was the actor Sir Henry Irving, followed by the actor Edward O'Connor Terry in 1888. This tendency towards the arts continued to be reflected in the Lodge's membership for many years.

The club and lodge have never been formally connected except in name. Lodge membership is not restricted to Savage Club members; however, most who join still have a professional life in literature, art, drama, music, science or law.

=== Founders of the Savage Club Lodge ===
- Francis Wyatt Truscott
- John Maclean
- J. R. Somers Vine
- Thomas Catling
- Henry Irving
- Archibald McNeill
- W. E. Chapman
- Raymond Tucker
- Thomas Burnside
- Earl of Dunraven
- John Paige
- Gustav von Franck

== See also ==
- List of London's gentlemen's clubs
