= Sidney Kilner Levett-Yeats =

English novelist

Sidney Kilner Levett-Yeats CIE (c. 1858–1916), an English novelist known professionally as S. Levett-Yeats, was the descendant of an old English trading family with connections to British India. S. Levett-Yeats became a soldier with the Indian Army and later joined the Indian Civil Service as a low-level bureaucrat. Inspired by the example of other ambitious Anglo-Indian writers like Rudyard Kipling, Levett-Yeats turned out a series of Victorian potboilers, often set in Europe, that earned him a place on the bestseller lists of the day.

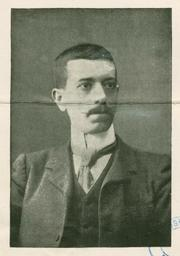
Sidney Kilner Levett-Yeats

== Family ==
Levett-Yeats was descended from Francis Levett, an English factor working for the Levant Company in Livorno, Italy, who later moved to British East Florida to become a planter. Levett's daughter married Dr. David Yeats, a physician who was the Secretary of the East Florida Colony in Florida. The Levetts were an old Anglo-Norman family who grew rich building one of the first large English multinational trading firms, Sir Richard Levett & Co. In that capacity, the family traded around the globe, and Sir Richard Levett, Lord Mayor of London, served as an early member of the London East India Company. Sidney Levett-Yeats was born in England, the son of Charles Levett-Yeats. His father, who died in 1878, was Under-Secretary to the Government of Bombay. His mother was the former Caroline Smith, daughter of James Smith, Esq., of Satara district, Maharashtra, India, where the couple were married at St Thomas' Church in 1857.

Levett-Yeats' brother Gerald Aylmer (known professionally as G.A. Levett-Yeats) was also a writer, as well as an illustrator, particularly of books relating to the fauna and flora of the subcontinent and the East. G.A. Levett-Yeats (1863–1938) lived in Calcutta, and was best known for his illustrations for the books The Birds of Singapore Island and The Common Birds of India. Like his brother, G.A. Levett-Yeats began his career in the Indian civil service, in his case as "sub-deputy opium inspector" in the "Opium Department" in Bengal. G.A. Levett-Yeats' own book about India of 1898 carried the title: India: In the Land of the White Poppy. His other book about India was called My Indian Garden.

== Early career ==
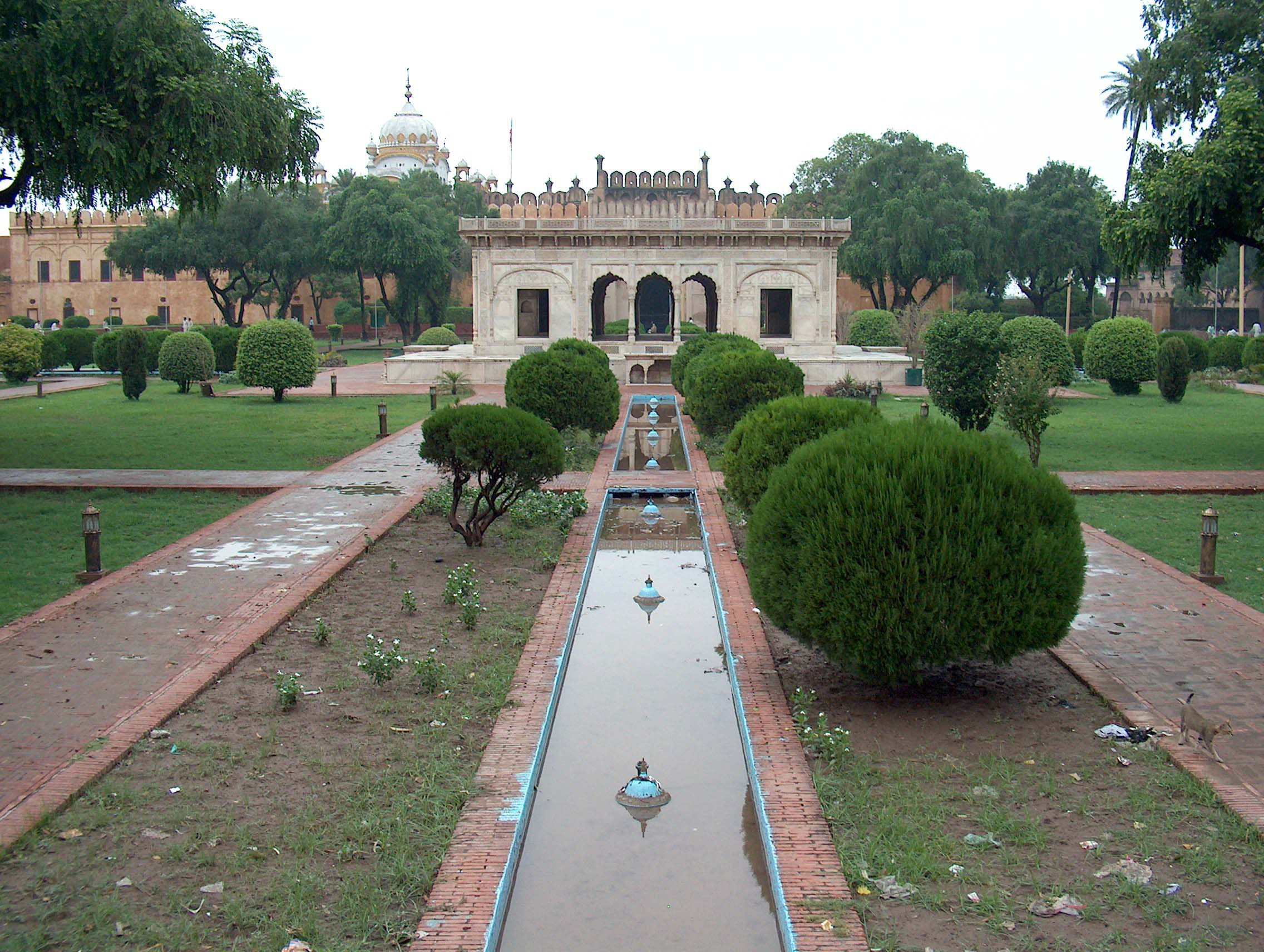
Hazuri Bagh in the Walled City of Lahore where S. Levett-Yeats worked 15 years

Sidney Levett-Yeats' career began as a soldier in the British Indian Army, where he served as Lieutenant in the Punjab Light Horse. He later entered the British government civil service in the Punjab, where he began writing fiction on the side. His title within Her Majesty's Government was Deputy Examiner in the Public Works Department, and he served 15 years in the department. But as his career as a popular novelist took off, he eventually received a furlough from his civil service job in India and returned to England.

== Novels ==
Levett-Yeats set his boisterous novels in wildly different locales, and his novels struck a chord with an English audience enamoured of historical romance. The genre was so popular that it was known as the 'cloak and sword school.' The Lord Protector, for instance, set in the days of the English Commonwealth under Oliver Cromwell, describes the hunting down of an ardent Royalist. A Galahad of the Creeks was set during the Burmese wars. The Chevalier d'Auriac concerned Henry of Navarre. Other tales were set in swashbuckling Europe. Orrain: A Romance, published by Methuen in London and by Longmans in the United States, told a tale of King Henry II of France and his wife Catherine de' Medici. The Chevalier d'Auriac was serialized in Longman's Magazine in 1897.

Levett's best-known book was The Honour of Savelli, a tale of treachery and intrigue set during the era of the Borgias in medieval Italy. The work, noted a review in the magazine Book Reviews, captured Levett's strong suit: his storytelling ability. "The freedom and dash of his recital, and the general ability shown in the handling of his characters and in the quality of his style are his strongest credentials," noted the review.

== Critique ==
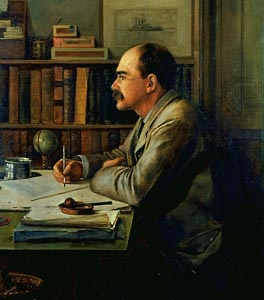
Rudyard Kipling, fellow member with Levett-Yeats at Lahore's Punjab Club

The Honour of Savelli even made Levett-Yeats' friend from Lahore's Punjab Club, Rudyard Kipling, sit up and take notice. "When I knew him in the Punjab Club in the old days," Kipling wrote to a friend about Levett-Yeats, "he was full of notions about a mutiny tale and he may have something up his sleeve that would be worth getting at."

Levett-Yeats had a flair for story, but the critics were not always impressed by his writing style. "He has romance and pretty turn for dramatic episodes," said The New York Tribune about his book The Heart of Denise and Other Tales. "The Indian tales show that while Mr. Yeats is far below Mr. Kipling in the treatment of the material to be found among the natives, he is at any rate clever and readable. His vignettes of landscape are drawn with special grace."

== Style ==
Levett's novels were the equivalent of today's action movies: full of chase scenes, dramatic battles and high-strung melodrama. The gist of Levett-Yeats' Chevalier d'Auriac, said The New York Times, "is the way the King reveals his true manliness and gives over Mme. de Tremouille to the Chevalier, who had wooed her so long and undergone so many dangers on her account." Perhaps more darkly, The Times hinted in its review of such astonishing similarities between Levett's book and that of another popular writer of the day, Stanley J. Weyman, that, it declared, "were it not for the author's name and preface, the average reader would certainly believe (it) to be another work from the facile pen of Mr. Weyman."

For English novelists of the age, India offered a beguiling chance to explore the exotic and the raffish. Levett-Yeats began with tales of the East, before moving on mostly to stories set among the jousters of medieval Europe. "India still remains a favorite hunting-ground of the novelist, and the field of Mr. Kipling and Mrs. Steel is this week re-occupied by Mr. S. Levett-Yeats, who is well-known at the libraries by reason of his successful story, 'The Honour of Savelli,'" said the New York magazine The Critic in 1897. Because of his service as soldier, bureaucrat and traveller on the Indian subcontinent, noted the magazine, "he has therefore had abundant opportunity for observing the things which he describes."

== Later life ==
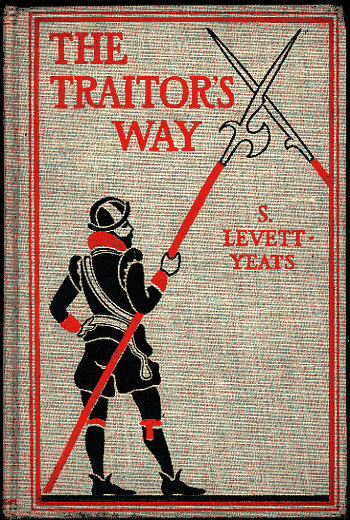
Cover, The Traitor's Way, Sidney Kilner Levett-Yeats, Stokes, New York, 1901

Unlike Kipling, who stayed with the characters and literary topography he mined in India, Levett-Yeats was driven by temperament or the demands of readers and the marketplace to stray further afield. He returned to England, where he lived as a successful, although mostly critically ignored, commercial novelist. Unlike Kipling, Levett-Yeats seemed more interested in rewards of the pocketbook rather than paeans from the critics, and by that measure, at least, he seems to have been a success.

In his retelling of medieval legends that echoed King Arthur, Levett-Yeats provided a window into the British colonial mind at the end of the nineteenth century. Some scholars now suggest that Levett-Yeats' tales of chivalric derring-do mask a deeper insecurity about the English mandate in India. Underlying the romance of Levett-Yeats' tales, they suggest, is a darker world view, tinctured by the challenges to British authority in the Punjab after the Indian Rebellion of 1857, which demonstrated how tenuous the East India Company's hold was on an enormous nation. Levett-Yeats' anachronistic tales of distressed damsels and heroic knights might have been the tonic England needed at the time.

In 1906 he married a lady named Mildred Eagles, and after this date, he does not appear to have published anything. He was awarded the Companion of the Order of the Indian Empire (C.I.E.) in recognition of his services in India.

Levett-Yeats was a member of the Savage Club in London, as well as the Punjab and United Service Clubs in Lucknow. He listed his hobbies as "riding, shooting and hunting."

Sidney Kilner Levett-Yeats died at Steyning, West Sussex, in 1916.
