= Papazov Passage =

Antarctic strait

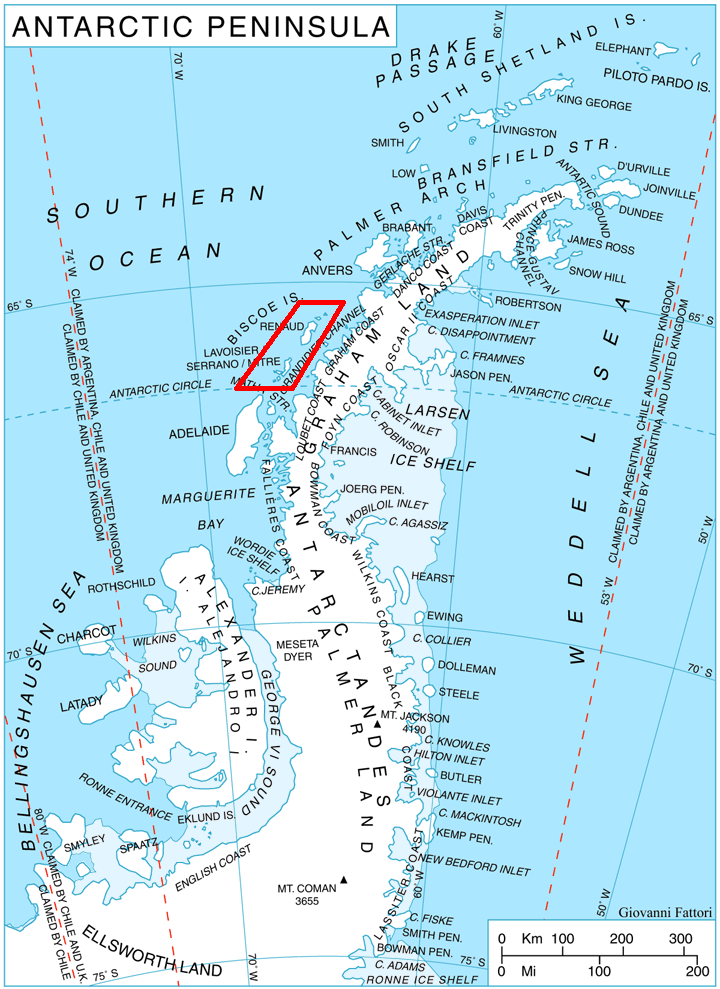
Location of Biscoe Islands in the Antarctic Peninsula region

Papazov Passage (Bulgarian: Папазов проток, romanized: Papazov protok, IPA: [pɐˈpazof ˈprɔtok]) is the 4.5 km long and 1 km wide passage between Krogh Island on the east and DuBois Island on the west in Biscoe Islands, Antarctica. St. Christopher Island and Bona Mansio Island lie in the eastern part of the passage.

The feature is named after the Bulgarian oceanographer and seaman Doncho Papazov, who undertook several lifeboat and yacht expeditions including a 164-day single-handed non-stop circumnavigation of Antarctica by way of the ‘Impossible route’ below 40th parallel south and Cape Horn in 1988, and an around-the-world voyage together with his wife Yuliya Gurkovska and their daughter Yana, then 6, in 1979–81.

== Location ==
Papazov Passage is centred at 66°15′15″S 67°08′10″W. British mapping in 1976.

== Maps ==
- British Antarctic Territory. Scale 1:200000 topographic map. DOS 610 Series, Sheet W 66 66. Directorate of Overseas Surveys, UK, 1976
- Antarctic Digital Database (ADD). Scale 1:250000 topographic map of Antarctica. Scientific Committee on Antarctic Research (SCAR). Since 1993, regularly upgraded and updated
