= Pancho Vladigerov =

Bulgarian composer (1899–1978)

- Панчо Владигеров
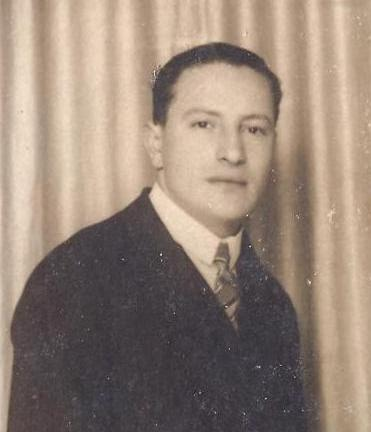
- Vladigerov in 1928
- Born: 13 March 1899; Zürich, Switzerland
- Died: 18 September 1978 (aged 79); Sofia, Bulgaria
- Resting place: Central Sofia Cemetery; 42°42′45.3″N 023°19′58.5″E
- Occupation: Composer
- Website: vladigerov.org/en

Pancho Haralanov Vladigerov (or Wladigeroff, Wladigerow, Vladiguerov, Vladigueroff; Bulgarian: Панчо Хараланов Владигеров [ˈpant͡ʃo xɐrɐˈɫanov vɫɐdiˈɡɛrof]; 13 March 1899 – 8 September 1978) was a Bulgarian composer, pedagogue, and pianist.

Vladigerov is arguably the most influential Bulgarian composer of all time. He was one of the first to successfully combine idioms of Bulgarian folk music and classical music. Part of the so-called Second Generation Bulgarian Composers, he was among the founding members of the Bulgarian Contemporary Music Society (1933), which later became the Union of Bulgarian Composers. Vladigerov marked the beginning of a number of genres in Bulgarian music, including the violin sonata and the piano trio. He was also a very respected pedagogue; his students include practically all notable Bulgarian composers of the next generation, such as Alexander Raichev, Alexander Yossifov, Stefan Remenkov, and many others, as well as the pianist Alexis Weissenberg.

== Biography ==
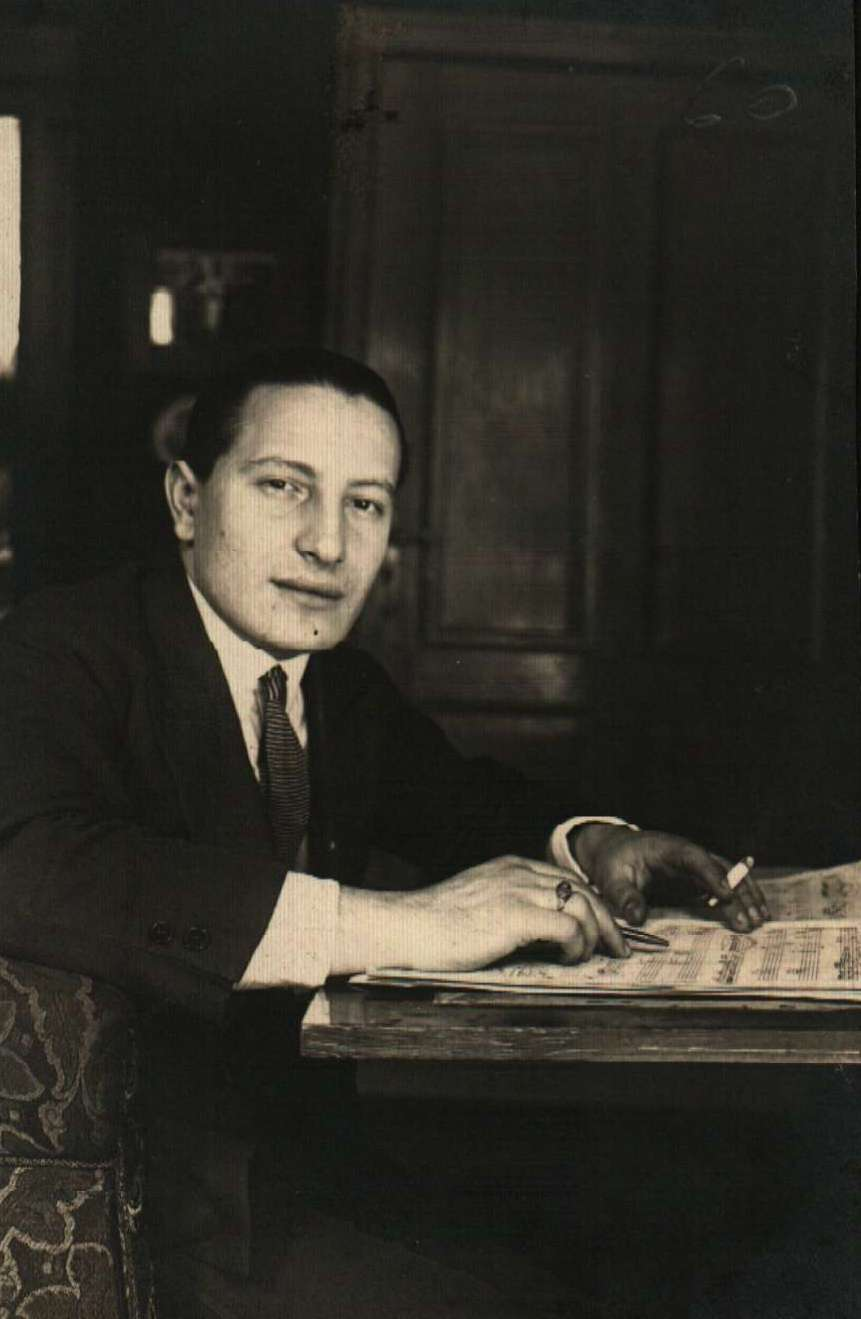
Pancho Vladigerov

Vladigerov was born in Zürich, Switzerland, but lived in Shumen, Bulgaria. His mother Dr. Eliza Pasternak was a Russian Jew. His father Dr. Haralan Vladigerov was a Bulgarian lawyer and a politician. Pancho Vladigerov played the piano and composed from an early age. In 1910, two years after his father's early death, Vladigerov and the rest of his family moved to Sofia, where Pancho started studying composition with Dobri Hristov, the most distinguished Bulgarian composer of his generation.

Pancho's maternal grandfather, Leon Pasternak, a Russian Jew who left Odessa and settled in Zurich a few years before Pancho's birth, was a very influential figure in Pancho's musical development and later success. The grandfather, a mathematician by profession, and an amateur chess player, musician and composer, used to play the violin with Pancho and his twin brother, Lyuben. Based on a Jewish tune his grandfather taught him, Vladigerov composed in 1951 his great symphony, the "Jewish Poem", Opus 47. This symphony received in 1952 the highest honor given by the Bulgarian Government to an artist, the Dimitrov Prize, and earned him the admiration of his fellow musicians: "A work like this is written only once in a hundred years", Dmitri Shostakovich exclaimed.

In 1912 Vladigerov's mother managed to obtain a governmental scholarship for her children to study in Berlin, where Pancho and his twin brother, the violinist Lyuben Vladigerov, were enrolled at the Staatliche Akademische Hochschule für Musik (now part of the Berlin University of the Arts), which was under the auspices of the Academy of Arts. Pancho Vladigerov studied music theory and composition with Paul Juon and piano with Karl Heinrich Barth. In 1920 he graduated from the academy after having studied piano also with Leonid Kreutzer, composition with Friedrich Gernsheim and Georg Schumann. He twice won the Mendelssohn Prize of the academy (in 1918 and 1920).

After his graduation Vladigerov became music director at Deutsches Theater in Berlin and worked with the famous theatre director Max Reinhardt. In 1932, after much hesitation, he decided to return to Sofia, where he was appointed professor in Piano, Chamber Music and Composition at the State Academy of Music, which is now named after him.

Vladigerov composed in a variety of genres including an opera (Tsar Kaloyan, to a libretto by Nikolai Liliev and Fani Popova-Mutafova), ballet, symphonic music, five piano concertos, two violin concertos, chamber music including string quartet, trio (violin, cello and piano), works and transcriptions for violin and piano and numerous opuses for solo piano, 38 transcriptions of instrumental pieces for instrument and piano, 13 late transcriptions of his earlier works for two pianos, fifty folksong concert arrangements for voice and piano/orchestra, 20 songs for voice and piano, ten choral songs with piano/orchestra, incidental music for the performances of the Deutsches Theater in Berlin, the Theater in der Josefstadt in Vienna, and the National Theatre in Sofia.

Vladigerov gained considerable fame in Europe in the 1920s when many of his pieces were published by Universal Edition in Vienna and released on LPs by the German recording company Deutsche Grammophon before being performed throughout Europe and the USA. As pianist and composer he toured most of the European countries performing mainly his own works. In 1969 he was awarded the Herder Prize by the University of Vienna. The Bulgarian recording company Balkanton released an edition of his stage and symphony music in four sets of seven LPs each; however, only a very small portion of his works is currently available on CD.

Vladigerov's music has been admired by such diverse personalities as Richard Strauss, Dmitri Shostakovich, and Aram Khachaturian. It has been performed by artists such as Alexis Weissenberg, David Oistrakh, Emil Gilels, Ivan Drenikov and, most recently, Marc-André Hamelin; however, he still remains a largely unknown name except in his home country. His solo piano music has been performed in concert several times in the UK recently by Bulgarian-born pianist Valentina Seferinova, who continues to champion his music.

Vladigerov's most performed and emblematic work is unquestionably Vardar Rhapsody, also known as Bulgarian Rhapsody. Originally written for violin and piano, it was later orchestrated and arranged for various instruments. The work is considered fiery and patriotic, as exemplified in the words of an admiring critic "the Bulgarian equivalent of Chopin's Polonaise in A Major".

== Recordings ==
A substantial part of Vladigerov's orchestral, chamber and piano music has been recorded by Bulgarian and international artists and labels, including Balkanton, Naxos, Capriccio and Bulgarian National Radio.

The Bulgarian recording company Balkanton released a large archival edition of Vladigerov's stage and symphonic music in four boxed sets of seven LPs each.

Among the historic recordings of Vladigerov's works are performances by David Oistrakh, including Song from the Bulgarian Suite, Op. 21. Oistrakh also recorded the Bulgarian Rhapsody Vardar in its violin version.

Leonid Kogan recorded Bulgarian Rhapsody Vardar for the Soviet label Melodiya.

Emil Gilels recorded piano miniatures by Vladigerov for Melodiya.

Recordings of Vladigerov's orchestral music were also made by the Bulgarian National Radio Symphony Orchestra under the baton of Alexander Vladigerov.

The complete piano concertos were recorded by pianist Ludmil Angelov and conductor Nayden Todorov.

Naxos released recordings of Vladigerov's orchestral works with the State Opera Rousse and conductor Nayden Todorov.

Violin works by Vladigerov, including Song, were recorded by violinist Bojidara Kouzmanova and conductor Nayden Todorov.

Recordings of Vladigerov's violin repertoire have also been performed and recorded by violinists Svetlin Roussev and Mario Hossen.

Capriccio released recordings dedicated to Vladigerov's stage music and orchestral works.

== Selected works ==
=== Stage ===
- Tsar Kaloyan, opera

=== Orchestral ===
- Autumn Elegy, Op. 15 (1922)
- Six Exotic Preludes, Op. 17
- Bulgarian Suite, OP. 21
- Seven Bulgarian Dances, Op. 23
- Concert Overture Earth, Op. 27 (1933)
- Symphony No. 1 in D minor, Op. 33 (1939)
- Four Romanian Dances, Op. 38
- Romanian Sketches, Op. 39
- Symphony No. 2 in B♭ major May, Op. 44 (1949)
- Heroic Overture, Op. 45 (1949)
- Lyulin Impressions, Op. 63

=== Concertante ===
- Piano Concerto No. 1 in A minor, Op. 6 (1918)
- Violin Concerto No. 1 in F minor, Op. 11
- Piano Concerto No. 2 in C minor, Op. 22 (1930)
- Piano Concerto No. 3 in B♭ minor, Op. 31 (1937)
- Concert Fantasy for cello and orchestra, Op. 35
- Piano Concerto No. 4 in G major, Op. 48 (1953)
- Piano Concerto No. 5 in D major, Op. 58 (1963)
- Violin Concerto No. 2 in G minor, Op. 61

=== Instrumental ===
- Bulgarian Rhapsody Vardar, Op. 16, for violin and piano
- Five Silhouettes, Op. 66 (1974), for piano

== Legacy ==
Pancho Vladigerov's house at No. 10, Yakubitsa, in Sofia has been transformed into a museum.

The Intellectual Legacy of Pancho Vladigerov Foundation was founded in the autumn of 2006 by Pancho Vladigerov Jr.

Vladigerov's name is also preserved in the following.

- An international music competition held every two years since 1986 in Shumen
- The National Academy of Music "Prof. Pancho Vladigerov" in Sofia
- Vladigerov Passage in Antarctica

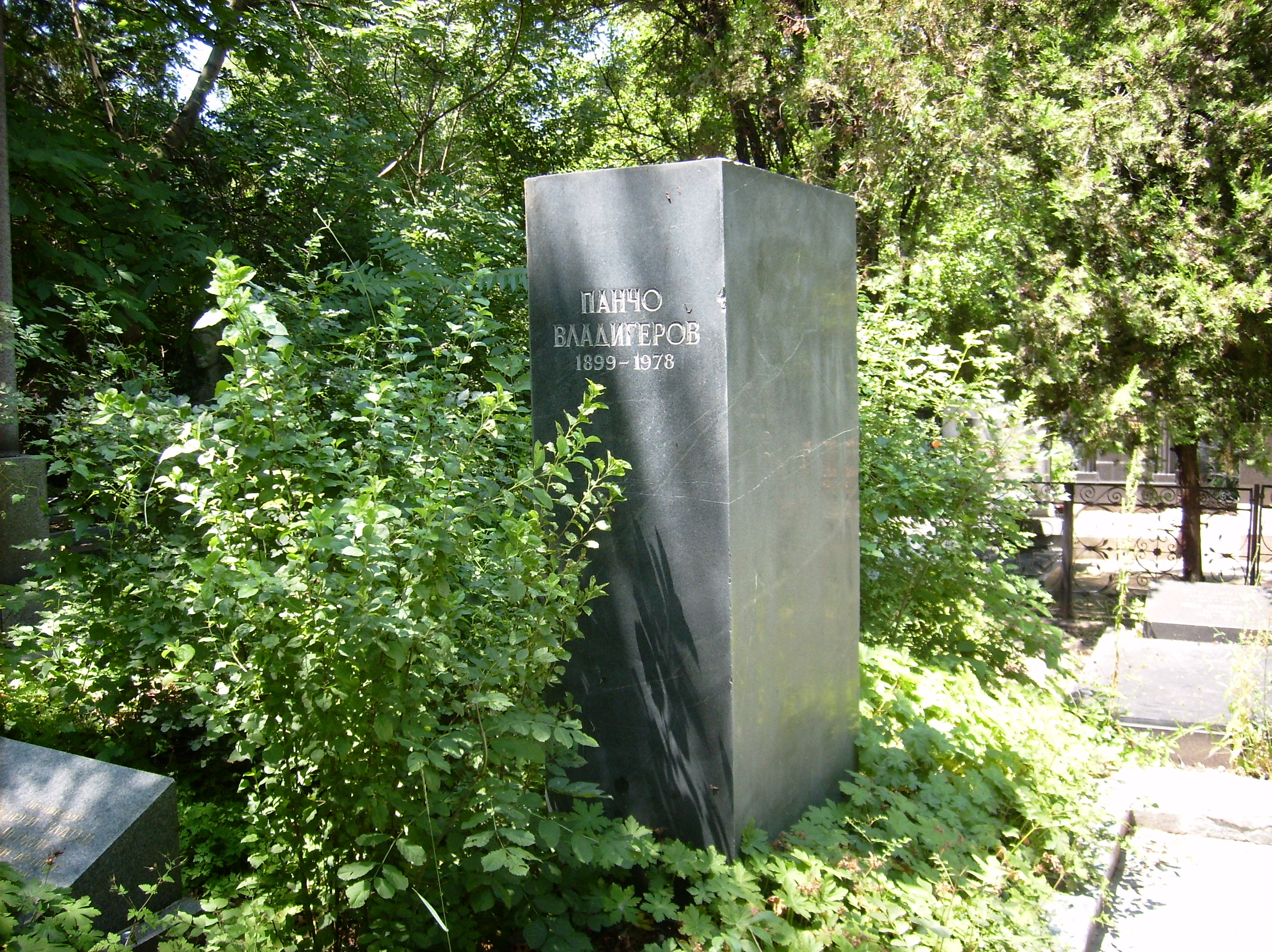
Pancho Vladigerov's grave in Central Sofia Cemetery
