= Yulia Gurkovska =

Bulgarian sailor, politician

Yulia Grigorova Gurkovska
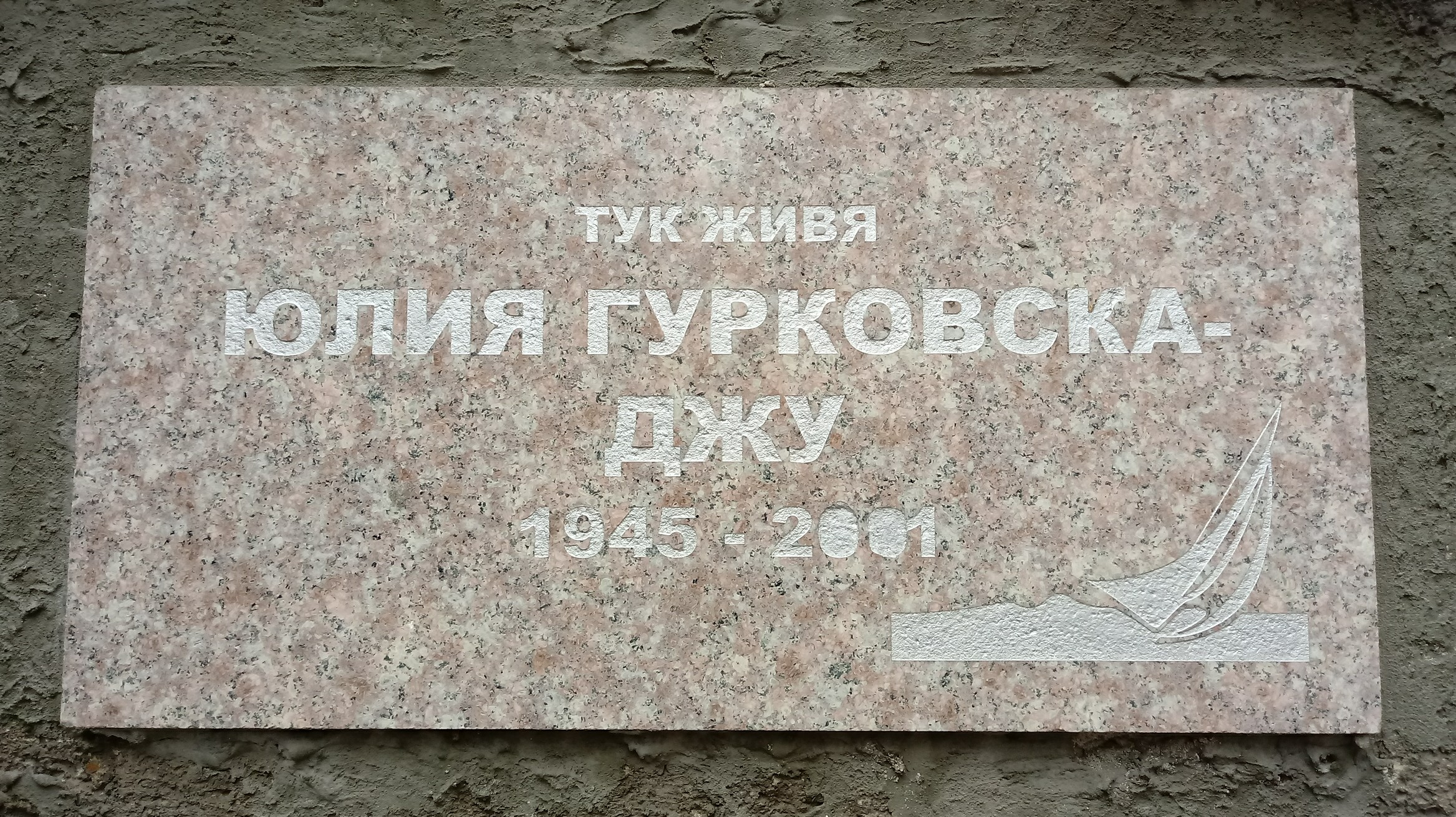
- Memorial plaque to Yulia Gurkovska located at 7A Bistritsa Str., Sofia, Bulgaria.
- Born: 7 June 1945
- Education: National Academy of Music (Bulgaria)
- Occupations: Sailor, politician
- Known for: Sailing on the first voyage around Europe in winter
- Spouse: Doncho Papazov
- Children: One

Yulia Grigorova Gurkovska (1945–2001), was a Bulgarian sailor and sound editor and, for a few years, the chief of staff of the country's President Zhelyu Zhelev.

== Biography ==
Yulia (sometimes spelled Julia and sometimes shortened to Dju) was born in Sofia, Bulgaria, on 7 June 1945 as the daughter of Grigor Gurkovski, secretary of the Bulgarian Agricultural People's Union who was arrested after the communist coup on 9 September 1944 and spent 11 years in a concentration camp.

Yulia Gurkovska graduated from the State Conservatory (1968) and began working as a music designer and sound engineer at the Studio for Popular Science Films "Vreme" in 1969. She married the sailor Doncho Papazov in the autumn of 1972 and she took his name.

Together, the couple sailed across the Black Sea from Varna, Bulgaria to Sochi, Russia by lifeboat in one of Papazov's Plankton expeditions. In 1976, they embarked on a lifeboat that had a sail crossing the Pacific from Lima, Peru to Suva, Fiji. By doing so, the couple set a double world record - they spent more time than anyone in the world on board a lifeboat (191 days), sailing the greatest distance (14,000 nautical miles).

In 1978, on the two-masted yacht "Tivia" owned by the Bulgarian National Television (BNT), the husband and wife team, with their daughter Yana (5 years old), the television journalist and traveler Simeon Idakiev and his colleagues from BNT Boris Siriyski, Rumen Kostov, Petar Andonov sailed around Europe (5,000 nautical miles). The trip resulted in the book With a yacht around Europe by Idakiev and a television series that he filmed with the BNT team during the voyage. In his book, Idakiev described the trip: "The special thing about the sailing is that it is the first such tour of Europe in winter."

Next, in 1979-1981, the couple and their 7-year-old daughter Yana made a round-the-world voyage on the yacht "Tivia" (built in Gdansk, Poland in 1978) on the route Sozopol, Bulgaria - Mediterranean Sea - Gibraltar - Panama - Torres Strait - Cape of Good Hope - Brazil - Gibraltar - Sozopol, sailing 42,000 nautical miles in 777 days.

Yulia Gurkovska divorced Papazov in 1990, returning to her maiden name.

Gurkovska was a member of the Union of Bulgarian Filmmakers (SBFD) and for 22 years was a sound engineer at the "Vreme" Studio for Popular Science Films.

== Political activist ==
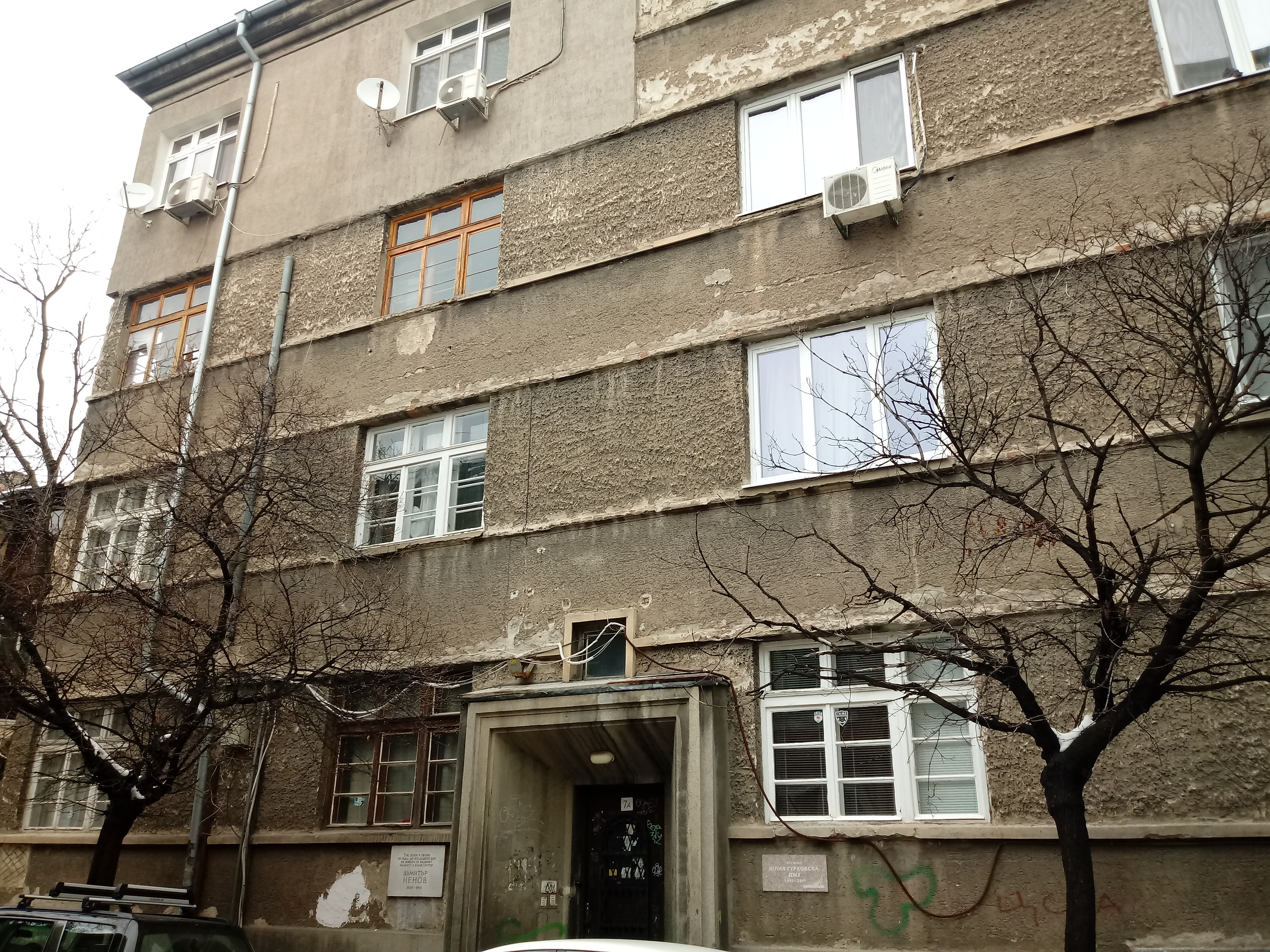
Home of Yulia Gurkovska with memorial plaques, 7A Bistritsa Str., Sofia

Gurkovska participated in the dissident movement in Bulgaria as a member of the Public Committee for Environmental Protection of Ruse, the Club for Glasnost and Reconstruction and the Committee for National Reconciliation.

She served as the chief of staff to President Zhelyu Zhelev (1992–1996) and resigned after losing the primaries. After that, she was a member of the Management Board and program director of the Centre for Liberal Strategies in Sofia (1996–2001).

Gurkovska died of cancer on 4 December 2001. Since 2002, the Centre for Liberal Strategies has held annual DJU memorial lectures in her memory.

== Honors ==
- In 1977, Yulia Gurkovska was awarded the Order of the People's Republic of Bulgaria, 1st degree.
- In 2016, by Decree of President Rosen Plavneliev, a bay in Antarctica was named after her.

== Selected works ==
She co-authored three books, "With Dju across the Atlantic" (1975), "With Dju across the Pacific Ocean" (1977), "Around the World With Yana" (1983).
