= Pendleton Strait =

Pendleton Strait (66°0′S 66°30′W) is a strait between Rabot and Lavoisier Islands, in the Biscoe Islands. The French Antarctic Expedition, in accordance with Charcot's conception of this water feature, applied the name Pendleton Bay in January 1909. The British Graham Land Expedition (BGLE) under Rymill, 1934–37, recognizing that it is really a strait, renamed it Pendleton Strait. Named by Charcot for Captain Benjamin Pendleton, Yankee sealer of Stonington, CT. Captain Pendleton was commodore of the little fleet which included the sloop Hero under Captain Nathaniel B. Palmer who, at Pendleton's direction, explored this area in January 1821.
