= Suregetes Cove =

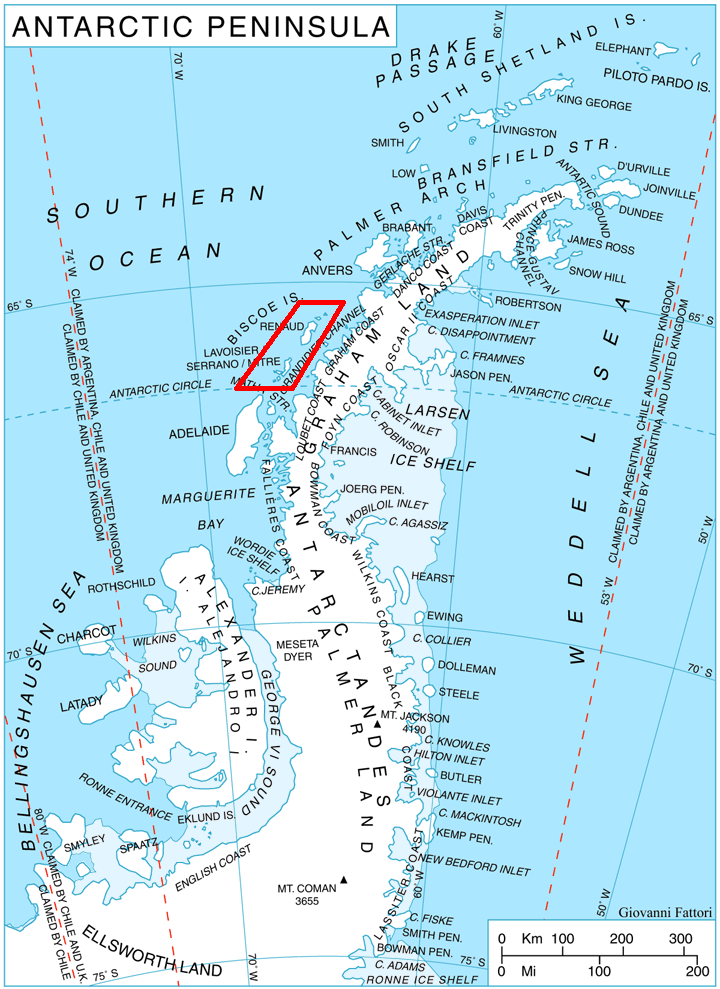
Location of Biscoe Islands in the Antarctic Peninsula region.

Suregetes Cove (Bulgarian: залив Сурегетес, romanized: zaliv Suregetes, IPA: [ˈzalif sorɛˈɡɛtɛs]) is the 2.47 km wide cove indenting for 1.9 km the N coast of Krogh Island in Biscoe Islands, Antarctica. It is entered east of Kuvikal Point and west of Zagrade Point.

The cove is named after the Thracian god Suregetes.

== Location ==
Suregetes Cove is centred at 66°15′40″S 66°56′40″W. British mapping in 1976.

== Maps ==
- British Antarctic Territory. Scale 1:200000 topographic map. DOS 610 Series, Sheet W 66 66. Directorate of Overseas Surveys, UK, 1976.
- Antarctic Digital Database (ADD). Scale 1:250000 topographic map of Antarctica. Scientific Committee on Antarctic Research (SCAR), 1993–2016.
