= Gustav von Franck =

Gustav Ritter von Franck (born 22 March 1807, Vienna – died 8 January 1860, London) was a writer and publisher from the Austrian Empire.

== Life and work ==
Gustav Ritter von Franck was born on 22 March 1807 in Vienna and was the son of the banker and businessman Johann Jakob Ritter von Franck and his wife Anna Maria, née Graumann. He was the second oldest of seven sons.

The father's side of the von Franck family originated from Mulhouse, which was, at that time, part of the Swiss Confederation. On 8 November 1771, Gustav's grandfather, Johann Jakob Franck, a patrician and a member of the Grand Council of the city of Mulhouse, married Rosina von Fries, who was thirteen years younger and the daughter of Baron Philipp von Fries, whose brother, Johann von Fries, was regarded as one of the richest men of his time. Johann Jakob Franck moved with his wife to Austria and bought himself into the tobacco business there. The Empress Maria Theresia elevated him to Knighthood for his activities in this sphere and, from then on, Johann Jakob and all his heirs were permitted to use the title 'von Franck' and display a coat of arms.

Franck's father, Johann Jakob von Franck, a wholesale dealer, banker and art lover, inherited his grandfather's wealth and his title. The von Franck household was at the centre of artistic and intellectual life in Vienna. Literary figures and musicians frequented the household, among whom Ludwig van Beethoven was a welcome guest during his stay in Vienna. Beethoven was the most well known pianist in Vienna at that time and he dedicated his sonata A-major, Opus 101 to Baroness Dorothea von Ertmann, an aunt of Gustav on his mother's side.

In 1829, Gustav von Franck received a Doctorate in Law in Padua. But he exercised his profession as an advocate for just several months since he was financially independent after the early death of his father. Thereafter, he was active exclusively as an author and publisher. His literary output consisted mainly of plays, comedies, tragedies and poetry; but he also wrote an autobiographical novel, journalistic pieces and revolutionary articles.

In 1842, whilst he was the Theater Director at the German Theater in Pest (nowadays a part of Budapest), he met his wife-to-be, the opera singer Sophie Wirnser. They had a daughter, Melanie von Franck, in 1844. Because of his revolutionary activities he had to flee Austria in 1848 and he then tried to establish himself in Leipzig and to publish a newspaper, the "Wiener Boten” (the Vienna Herald).

On the pretext of a legal action against his paper Gustav von Franck was arrested and threatened with extradition to Austria. His wife, Sophie, succeeded in getting him freed from the prison in Leipzig.

He fled via the Netherlands to England, where he subsequently settled. He survived at first by being an art teacher and portrait painter. A year later his wife and daughter followed him in exile. Then, after initial difficulties, Franck succeeded in gaining a reputation as a playwright. In collaboration with William und Robert Brough** he put on two comedies at the Haymarket Theatre and at the Lyceum Theatre and critics at the time acclaimed the popularity of "A Tale of a Coat" and "Kicks and Halfpence".

Franck was also a founder member of the "Savage Club", in Whitehall Place in London, which still exists today and he belonged to a circle of German speaking immigrants, who lived in exile in England. An account of his adventurous flight to England was published in the journal, “The Welcome Guest“.

Gustav von Franck died suddenly and unexpectedly on 8 January 1860; however, not by suicide as is reported in several literature lexicons, but from a physiological complaint. He was laid to rest in Brookwood Cemetery.

Gustav's wife Sophie and daughter, Melanie, returned to Germany via France three years later in 1864. A part of the Franck family moved from Vienna to Graz including Moritz Ritter von Franck (Mayor of Graz) and Alfred Ritter von Franck (painter and arts professor). His oldest brother Karl von Franck (Minister of War and Politician) died in Paris in 1867.

== Members of the Ritter von Franck family ==
- Johann Jacob von Franck
- Anna von Franck, geb. Graumann
- Baronin von Ertmann, geb. Graumann
- Alfred Ritter von Franck
- Karl von Franck
- Sophie von Franck, geb. Wirnser
- Melanie von Franck
- Moritz Ritter von Franck

== Opera ==
- Gedichte, Gedichtband. Wien: Sollinger, 1828.
- Mitteilungen aus den Papieren eines Wiener Arztes. Leipzig: Wigand, 1864.
- König Edwards Söhne. Trauerspiel in drei Aufzügen. Leipzig: Brockhaus, 1835.
- Belisar. Lyrische Tragödie. Wien: Gerold, 1836
- Dramatische Zeitbilder. Zwei Schauspiele. Leipzig: Wigand, 1837.
- Taschenbuch dramatischer Originalien. Leipzig: Brockhaus, 1837–1842.
- The Tale of a Coat. Lustspiel. London 1858.
- Kicks and Halfpence. Lustspiel. London um 1858.

== Editor ==
Taschenbuch dramatischer Originalien. Brockhaus, Leipzig 1837–1842

- Wiener Zeitschrift für Kunst, Literatur, Theater und Mode. Wien 1845.
- Wiener demokratisches Bürgerblatt. Wien 1848.
- Die Wiener Boten. Leipzig 1848.

== Literature ==
- Franck, Gustav Ritter von. In Constant von Wurzbach: Biographisches Lexikon des Kaiserthums Oesterreich. Vol. 4, Vienna 1858, p. 316–318
- Franz Brümmer: Deutsches Dichterlexikon. Leipzig 1876
- Heinz Rupp (Hrsg.): Deutsches Literatur-Lexikon. Bern and Munich 1978
- Walther Killy: Deutsche Biographische Enzyklopädie. Munich 1996
