= Alfred Louis Bacharach =

English food chemist and author (1891–1966)

- Born: 11 August 1891
- Died: 16 July 1966 (aged 74)
- Occupations: Food scientist, Scientific author, Socialist, and Editor

Alfred Louis Bacharach (11 August 1891 – 16 July 1966), was a British food scientist, scientific author, socialist, and editor of music history and criticism. He wrote as A. L. Bacharach.

== Education and politics ==
Bacharach was born in Hampstead, London and educated at St Paul's School, London and Clare College, Cambridge until 1914. At Cambridge he was a member of the Fabian Society, where he made a lifelong friendship with the journalist William Norman Ewer. He was a member of the 1917 Club for socialists in London's Soho, and later became involved with the left-wing Guild Socialist Movement and (for forty years) with the Labour Research Department. From 1914 and for the rest of his life he was closely associated with the Working Men's College in North West London, where friends and colleagues included Ivor Brown and C. E. M. Joad, as well as Ewer.

== Scientific career ==
He worked as a chemist at the Wellcome Research Laboratories in Kent during the war. From 1920 he was an analytical chemist at Joseph Nathan and Co Ltd in Greenford, Middlesex, which later changed its name to Glaxo Laboratories Ltd and eventually became GlaxoSmithKline. Bacharach was promoted to chief chemist and subsequently became head of the nutrition research unit. He spent most of his working life at Glaxo, from the first beginnings of the commercialization of vitamins, a subject on which he worked with Harry Jephcott. Bacharach advocated the fortification of baby milk with vitamin D in Britain, helping to eliminate rickets which was previously rife in northern cities. In later years he was responsible for editing Glaxo's scientific papers.

While at Glaxo he was the author of Science and Nutrition (1st edition, 1938; 2nd edition, 1945), and edited, with Theodore Rendle, The Nation's Food: A Survey of Scientific Data (1946). He was the editor (with Desmond Laurence), of the two volume Evaluation of Drug Activities: Pharmacometrics (1964), and (with Otto Edholm) Exploration Medicine (1965) and The Physiology of Human Survival (1965).

Outside of Glaxo, Bacharach was a founding member and president of Nutrition Society, and a vice president of the Royal Institute of Chemistry, the Society of Chemical Industry and the Society of Public Analysts. He also worked on many other councils and scientific committees.

== Music activities and publications ==
Bacharach's primary activity outside of science was music history. His interest in music began at St Paul's School and continued at Cambridge from 1909, where he took a Master of Arts degree after graduating as a chemist. He was an accomplished pianist, but always styled himself an amateur or "passive musician". Bacharach acted as the program secretary to the Sunday Chamber Music Society Concerts at the Working Men's College, Camden Town for 20 years. He persuaded internationally famous artists such as Harriet Cohen and Solomon to perform at the College, including several first performances of music by Arnold Bax.

He edited a series of music books in the 1940s and 1950s, some of which achieved high circulation and a long afterlife as they were published in the mass market Pelican series of non-fiction paperbacks by Allen Lane. They included The Musical Companion (1934, for Victor Gollancz, revised as The New Musical Companion in 1957), Lives of the Great Composers (three Pelican volumes, 1935, reissued and expanded between 1948 and 1954 in four Cassell volumes as The Music Masters, Pelican editions 1957), and British Music of Our Time (1946, revised 1951). He was a contributor to the Week-end Review, The Athenaeum and the New Statesman.

== Personal life ==
Bacharach kept up his interests in politics and education throughout his life, and was a reviewer of detective stories, claiming to read one a day. He was a member of the Savage Club, and listed his other enthusiasms as chess and birdwatching.

He died at his home in Hampstead (26 Willow Road, London NW3) aged 74, survived by his wife Elizabeth Owen (known as Lily, died 1971) and their two sons.
