= Saint Christopher Island (disambiguation) =

Saint Christopher Island most often refers to Saint Kitts, an island in the West Indies and part of the country of Saint Kitts and Nevis.

Saint Christopher Island (French: Île Saint-Christophe) may also refer to:

- St. Christopher Island (Antarctica), in Antarctica
- Île Saint-Christophe, a small island in Trois-Rivières, Quebec, Canada

== See also ==
- San Cristobal Island (disambiguation), the Spanish form of the same name
