= Doncho Donchev =

Bulgarian artist and illustrator

- Дончо Дончев
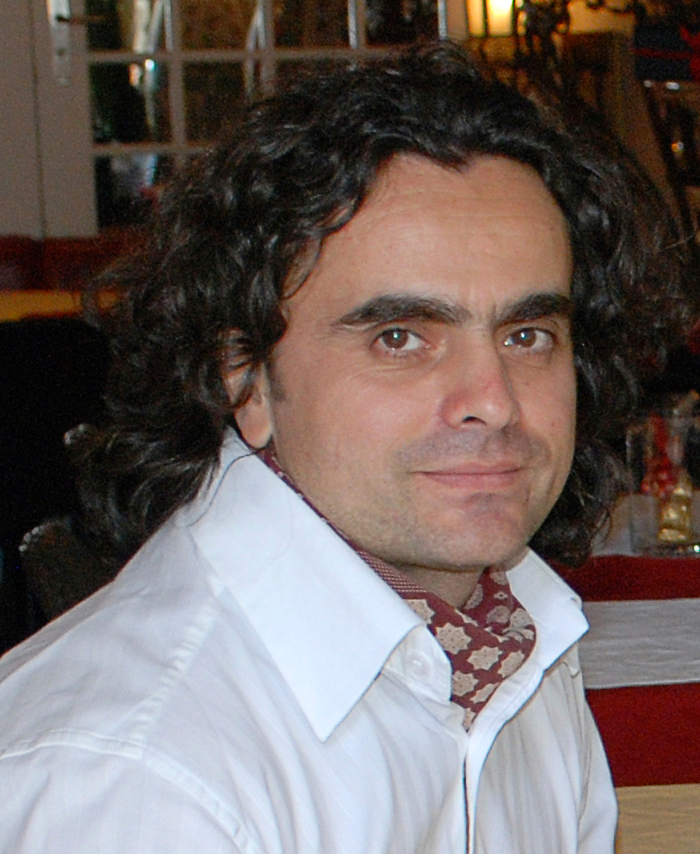
- Born: 22 August 1974 (age 51); Gabrovo, Bulgaria

Doncho Donchev (born 22 August 1974) is a Bulgarian artist and illustrator.

== Biography and work ==
Doncho Donchev was born on 22 August 1974 in Gabrovo, in the family of teachers. He graduated from the secondary Art School in Tryavna (1993) and completed Master's studies in St. Cyril and St. Methodius University of Veliko Turnovo (2000), in the programme Painting with Prof. Nikolay Ruschukliev.

He works with a variety of materials, holds one-man exhibitions, illustrates books and participates in music projects, drawing before an audience on stage. His childhood passed in Dryanovo, where he had his first exhibitions in Dryanovo Art Gallery, the Development cultural club and the Old School in Tryavna, as early as when he was a student. Since 1997 he has been exhibiting his works in various cities and countries and organizing a great number of one-man exhibitions.

Since 2000 he has been working in his studio in Sofia. He travels in Europe to present his projects. His works have been exhibited in Zurich, Bern, Locarno, Geneva, Liechtenstein, Stuttgart, Leipzig, Minden, Vienna, Milan, Brussels, Maastricht, Barcelona, Bratislava, Istanbul, İzmir, Jakobstad, Sofia, Plovdiv, Varna, Gabrovo, etc.

== Presentations ==
- "Particle Metamorphoses" CERN, Geneva 2016
- Milan – Expo 2015, pavilion "Corriere della Sera" (Riflessioni) curator Arminio Sciolli
- Sofia – Bulgaria hall, Sofia philharmonic (Metamorphoses) 2015
- Vaduz, Liechtenstein National Museum (Logos-Mythos) 2015
- Zurich, Petra Lossen Gallery (Logos-Mythos) 2014
- Sofia, Arena di Serdica (Playing Cards) 2013
- Istanbul, Gallery Ziraat Bank, 2011
- İzmir, Gallery "Akademist" (The Reincarnation of the Satir) 2007

== Exhibitions And live performances ==
- 2014 – Sofia Live Club – The Golden Project (Seventh Sense)
- 2014 – Ruse, Dohodno Zdanie – The Golden Project (Seventh Sense)
- 2014 – Varna, Boris Georgiev City Art Gallery – The Golden Project (Seventh Sense)
- 2015 – Plovdiv, Chamber Scene Plovdiv – The Golden Project (Seventh Sense)
- 2015 – Dobrich, Hall of Mirrors – The Golden Project (Seventh Sense)
- 2015 – Sofia, Bulgaria hall, Sofia philharmonic (Metamorphoses) – 2015
- 2015 – Minden, Germany – Fort A, The Golden Project & Anton Syarov
- 2015 – Balchik, Balchik Palace – The Golden Project (Seventh Sense)
- 2015 – Minden, Marienkirche – (Nocturne in Blue), musical compositions Anton Sjarov

== Illustrations ==
- 2015 – "Nocturne in Blue" by Anton Syarov – cover and illustrations
- 2014 – "Seventh Sense", "The Golden Project", cover and illustrations
- 2012 – Heavy Metal magazine – text Kerim Sakizli, publishing house "Arkabahce", Istanbul
- 2007 – "Fatemate" – graphic novel, text Kerim Sakizli, publishing house "Arkabahce", Istanbul
- 2007 – Poems in Paintings – poetry, text Kerim Sakizli, publishing house "Arkabahce", Istanbul
- 2007 – "The Reincarnation of the Satir" poetry, text Kerim Sakizli, publishing house "Arkabahce", Istanbul

== Projects and participations ==
- "Particle Metamorphoses" CERN, Geneva
- "Riflessioni" submitted: Expo 2015, pavilion newspaper "Corriere della Sera" curator Arminio Sciolli; Arte in dirreta, Locarno, LDV Gallery
- "Logos Mithos" submitted: Vaduz, Liechtenstein National Museum; Zurich – Petra Lossen Gallery
- "Graphic Stage" Vienna, Viva Art Gallery
- "Metamorphoses" Sofia – Bulgaria hall
- "Playing Cards" Sofia, Arena di Serdica; Plovdiv, Vinaria; Maasricht, CHICHO foundation

== Sources ==
- Official website
- Metamorphoses Of Doncho Donchev, www.stand.bg
- Sofia philharmonic
- Liechtenstein Exhibition, destinationdryanovo.com
- The Golden Project and Doncho Donchev, dariknews.bg
- Bulgarian Wikipedia article
