= Doncho Papazov =

Bulgarian oceanographer

- Born: February 21, 1939; Sofia, Bulgaria
- Scientific career
- Fields: Journalism; Adventure

Doncho Papazov (Bulgarian: Дончо Папазов) (born February 21, 1939, in Sofia, Bulgaria) is a Bulgarian oceanographer, adventurer and journalist. He is most famous for several marine voyages of increasing difficulty.

== Personal life ==
Doncho Papazov was born in Sofia on February 21, 1939. He is a record-holding diver and has participated in numerous archeological dives. He was married to Olga Herdova, from Czech Republic and has one son Alexandr Herda (*1969), later he was married to Julia Gurkovska (1945–2001) and has a daughter, Yana. Doncho Papazov is the author of four books and many documentaries about his voyages. He spent over 20 years working as a journalist for the Bulgarian National Television. He was also a member of the Coordinating Council of the Union of Democratic Forces, a member of the 36th Ordinary National Assembly, and deputy chairman of the Union of Bulgarian Journalists (1993–1995). He currently resides in Sofia.

== The Plankton I Expedition - Sozopol ==
15 days: July 20 - August 3, 1970.

In this first expedition of the Plankton program, Papazov set out to determine whether zoo-plankton can provide sufficient nutrition to survive on in extreme conditions. On board Dju II (a conventional dinghy), he spent 15 days alone off the coast of Sozopol in the Bay of Burgas in the Black Sea, eating nothing but plankton. Despite some weight loss, it was determined that plankton can potentially sustain humans in distress.

== The Plankton II Expedition - Across the Black Sea ==
26 days: May 25 - June 6, 1972.

Papazov undertook this expedition along with his wife, Julia Gurkovska (nicknamed Dju, giving her name to all the boats in the Dju series). In 26 days, they crossed the Black Sea from Varna to Sochi, aboard a standard keel-less lifeboat, Dju III. This was a continuation of the first plankton experiment, with their on-board diet supplying only 50% of required daily nutrition. Relying on zoo-plankton for the rest was shown to significantly reduce the expected exhaustion in their organisms. This was the first crossing of the Black Sea with a vessel of this caliber.

== The Plankton III Expedition - Across the Atlantic ==
63 days: May 8 - July 16, 1974.

This was the first truly daring expedition that Papazov and his wife undertook. On an 8-metre keel-less lifeboat (dubbed Dju IV), they set out to cross the Atlantic from Gibraltar to Cuba. The journey was a grueling test of endurance. The two-person crew had to keep 4-hour steering shifts around the clock to ensure the boat didn't flip over in the turbulent Atlantic. Unlike most yachts, Dju IV was originally a ship's lifeboat, made of two sheets of plastic bolted together. It was designed to withstand a few days at sea at most, and lacked a weighted keel, which made it prone to flipping and guaranteed that such a flip would be irreversible. The Plankton III voyage marked the first long-haul trip of such a lifeboat. The journey ended successfully in Santiago de Cuba.

== The Plankton IV Expedition - Across the Pacific ==
140 days (100 days at sea): March 17 - August 3, 1976.

After crossing the Atlantic, Papazov and his wife planned to cross the Pacific in a similar way. Leaning on their experiences with Dju IV, they outfitted their next lifeboat much more carefully. It sported a full deck, an outboard engine which powered a lit compass and their radio and a water pump. The crew had to maintain around-the-clock steering, and faced numerous technical problems.

In the first days of the expedition, the boat's radio antenna broke, cutting off communication with the outside world and making issuing a distress call impossible. Later the steering oar also broke, and finally, 1000 miles from Callao, the aluminum mast snapped in a storm, leaving them to complete the bulk of their journey with a makeshift mast.

Despite all obstacles, they consecutively reached the Marquesas, Tahiti, and Samoa. After 100 days at sea, their journey ended successfully in Fiji, 14,800 km from their starting point in Peru.

== Around Europe With Tivia ==
91 days: September 6 - December 9, 1978.

Having decided to sponsor Papazov's next voyage, the Bulgarian National Television purchased a two-mast yacht, model "Conrad - 45A", built in Gdańsk, Poland, in 1978. In exchange, Papazov was tasked with sailing the yacht from Gdańsk to Burgas along with a BNT filming crew. The yacht, named Tivia, took the journey around Europe in the winter of 1978, going through the Baltic Sea, the Bay of Biscay, the Mediterranean, and finally the Black Sea.

The crew consisted of Doncho Papazov, Julia Papazova, their 5-year-old daughter Yana, Simeon Idakiev, Boris Siriyski, Rumen Kostov and Peter Andonov. Simeon Idakiev wrote a book about the voyage, capturing all the difficult and comic moments.

== The Plankton V Expedition - Around the World ==
777 days: April 29, 1979 - June 14, 1981.

Among increased marital strains, Doncho and Julia began preparing for their around-the-world expedition. No longer on a life boat, the journey would be undertaken on Tivia, and would take two years. Doncho and Julia took their daughter Yana (then 6), tested in the Europe expedition, along for the journey, triggering some cautions from their family and various child welfare advocates. One of the experiments they conducted as a continuation of the Plankton program was teaching the Grade 1 curriculum while at sea.

Stage I: Sozopol - Gibraltar - Canary Islands - Martinique - Venezuela - Curaçao - Panama The Papazov family was joined by Harry Mladenov and Stoyan Miladinov from BNT from Sozopol to Gibraltar, and they shot a documentary about the expedition.

Stage II: Ecuador - Tahiti - Tonga - Rarotonga - Fiji - New Guinea - Torres Strait - Port Darwin (Australia)

Stage III: Port Darwin - Mauritius - Reunion Island

Stage IV: Reunion Island - Durban - Cape of Good Hope - Cape Town

Stage V: Cape Town - St. Helena - Brazil

Stage VI: Brazil - Azores - Gibraltar

Stage VII: Seuta - Algiers - Istanbul - Sozopol

== The Impossible Route Expedition ==
164 days: January 1, 1988 - June 13, 1988.

Papazov's final major expedition, a solo around-the-world voyage along the "Impossible Route", was undertaken on Tivia. The Impossible Route was called that because of the turbulence of the ocean South of the 40th parallel. Upon its successful completion, Papazov became the first voyager to go around the world uninterrupted through Cape Horn.

== Honours ==
Papazov Passage in Antarctica is named after Doncho Papazov.

== See also ==
- Kaliakra is another Gdańsk-built vessel with significant Bulgarian ties
