= Newburgh Point =

Newburgh Point (66°6′S 66°46′W) is the northwest point of Lavoisier Island, Biscoe Islands. Mapped from air photos taken by Falkland Islands and Dependencies Aerial Survey Expedition (FIDASE) (1958–59). Named by United Kingdom Antarctic Place-Names Committee (UK-APC) after Louis H. Newburgh (1883–1956), American physiologist who specialized in the physiology of heat regulation and clothing for cold environments.
