= Vladigerov Passage =

Passage in the Biscoe Islands, Antarctica

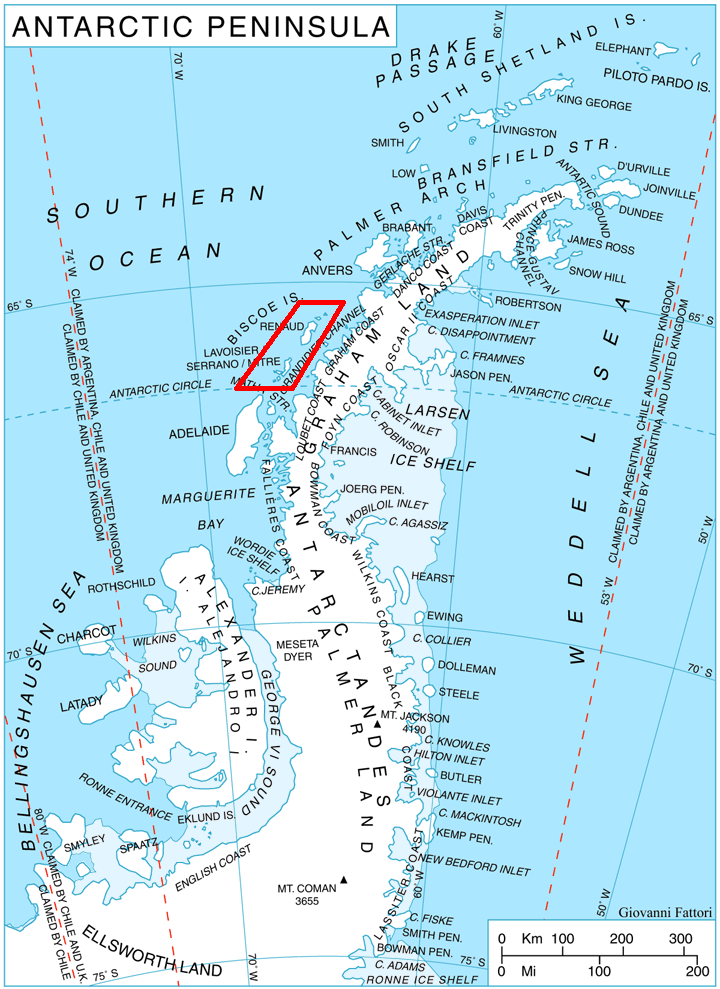
Location of Biscoe Islands in the Antarctic Peninsula region.

Vladigerov Passage (Bulgarian: Владигеров проток, ‘Vladigerov Protok’ \vla-di-'ge-rov 'pro-tok\) is a passage in the Biscoe Islands, Antarctica between Lavoisier Island on the east and Krogh Island on the west. It is 5.8 km long in the southwest-northeast direction and 1.05 km wide. The eponymous Vladigerov Island, 420 m long in southwest-northeast direction and 150 m wide, is lying in the narrowest part of the passage centred at 66°17′17″S 66°54′35″W, formed as a result of the retreat of the ice cap of Lavoisier Island in the early 21st century.

The passage is named after the Bulgarian composer Pancho Vladigerov (1899-1978).

== Location ==
Vladigerov Passage is centred at 66°16′57″S 66°53′50″W. British mapping in 1976.

== Maps ==
- British Antarctic Territory. Scale 1:200000 topographic map. DOS 610 Series, Sheet W 66 66. Directorate of Overseas Surveys, UK, 1976.
- Antarctic Digital Database (ADD). Scale 1:250000 topographic map of Antarctica. Scientific Committee on Antarctic Research (SCAR). Since 1993, regularly upgraded and updated.
