= Saint Christopher (yacht) =

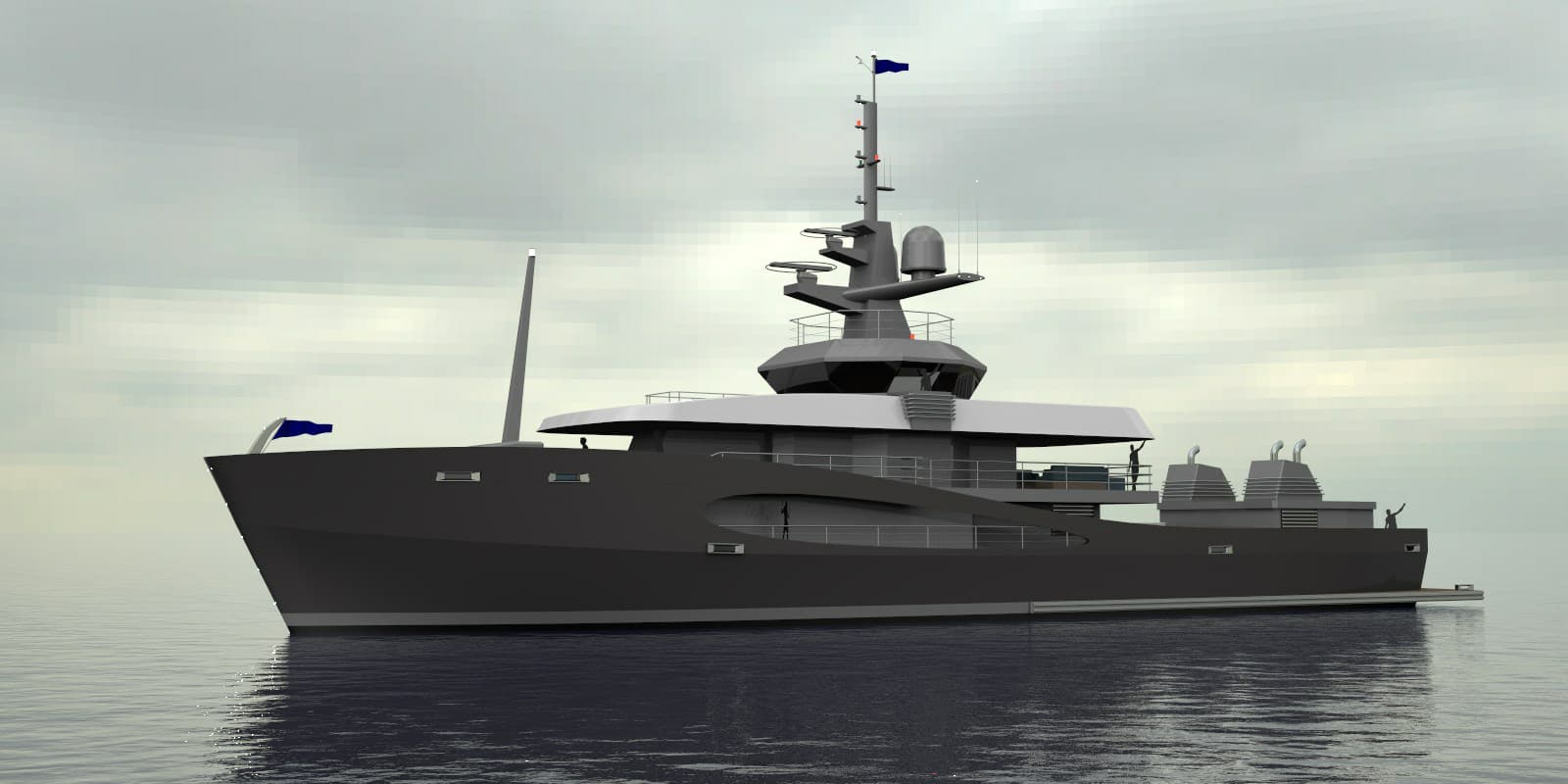
- Saint Christopher Project Rendering

History

New Zealand
- Name: Saint Christopher
- Namesake: Saint Christopher, Patron Saint of Travelers and Mariners.
- Port of registry: New Zealand
- Builder: Rsw Rosslauer Schiffswerft, Rosslau, Germany
- Laid down: 1973
- Christened: Black Ice
- Completed: 1988
- In service: April 2018
- Renamed: Saint Christopher
- Reclassified: Private Yacht
- Refit: 2016 - 2018
- Identification: Callsign: ZMW9987 IMO number: 7332775 MMSI number: 377406000
- Nickname(s): Kitt
- Fate: Ship sold for scrapping to Fornaes Shipbreaking Ltd. in 2020

General characteristics
- Type: Motor yacht
- Tonnage: 293 GT (USCG)
- Displacement: 862 metric tons
- Tons burthen: 455
- Length: 49.60 m (162.7 ft)
- Beam: 10.10 m (33.1 ft)
- Draft: 3.7 m (12 ft)
- Installed power: 993 hp (740 kW)
- Speed: 16.30 kn (30.19 km/h; 18.76 mph)
- Range: 38,500 nmi (71,300 km; 44,300 mi) @ 8.2 kn (15.2 km/h; 9.4 mph)
- Boats & landing craft carried: Custom 7.2m Sport Tender; Novurania 335 DL day Tender
- Crew: 11 Ship's Crew & six additional support staff.
- Aviation facilities: Aft helideck available.

Saint Christopher was the largest expedition explorer yacht and privately registered displacement motor yacht to fly the New Zealand flag.

It was originally a German built, Norwegian flagged steel cargo vessel, before being significantly overhauled to serve as an offshore rescue and supply vessel capable of recovering and accommodating 255 rescued persons in severe North Atlantic storm conditions. It was based in the North Sea and owned by . In 2011, it was refitted again, to undertake ultra-long range oil and gas research roles, cruising the world as the Guard Aleta. Some of her interior spaces were converted to more than 1,000m³ of fuel/cargo tank space. In 2016, she was sold to New Zealand based interests. Here, the vessel began another major re-purpose in Norway, between 2016 and 2017. After being laid up at anchor for years, she was sold for scrapping in Grenaa, Denmark

== History ==
The Saint Christopher made global headlines in 2016, when part of an initiative designed to support Pacific Island countries in times of economic crisis, natural disaster, or other event, was made public. The catalyst for the headlines was economic pressure on small island developing states caused by banking limits in OECD countries. As part of an emergency physical settlement network, the Saint Christopher was to be a mid-ocean fueling vessel for planned cash and asset shipments for inter-bank settlements in Tonga, Samoa, Fiji and other nearby countries, while serving as a cyclone/hurricane and tsunami event recovery platform for the region at other times of the year.

== Re-purpose ==
Following the expansion and foundation of APFII organisation, the high speed shipping routes were abandoned, and other vessels were sold off. The Saint Christopher was again re-purposed to stand in support of these remote parts of the world and protect fisheries and remove more than 1,000,000 kilograms of microplastic waste from the Pacific Ocean. Its former use as a small tanker, and as a supply vessel, with its large generator capacity, fire-fighting systems, and life support capacity, make it ideal for the region, including the requirement of being to be at sea for very extended periods of time. Saint Christopher has traveled over 250,000 nmi (460,000 km; 290,000 mi), including the North Sea, Atlantic, the Mediterranean, West Africa, the Caribbean, the Middle East, Suez Canal, Indian Ocean, South China Sea, Java Sea, and the Yellow Sea, and was viewed as a solid platform to contribute to local interests.

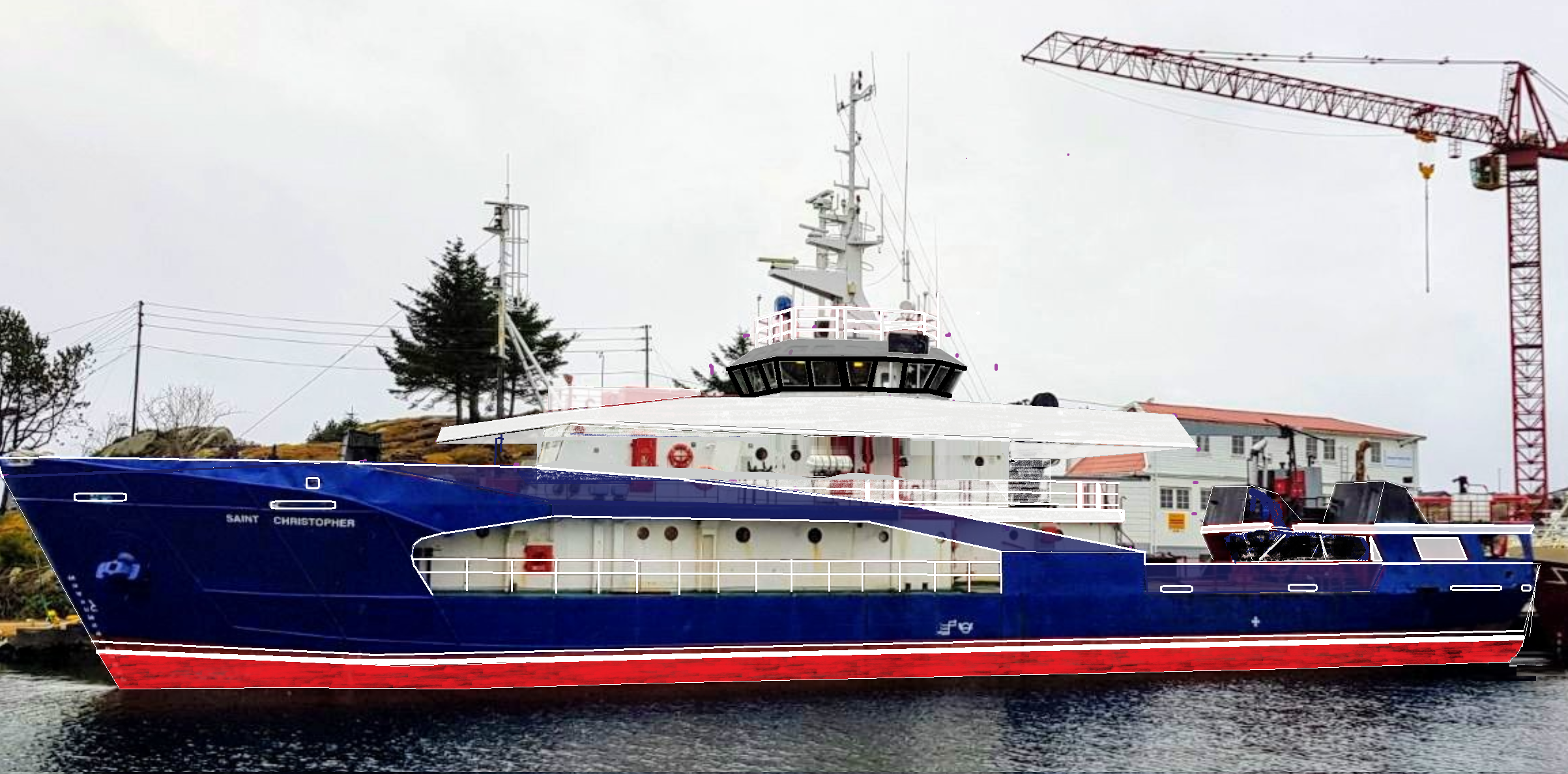
Work Underway on the Saint Christopher Yacht, Norway (2017)

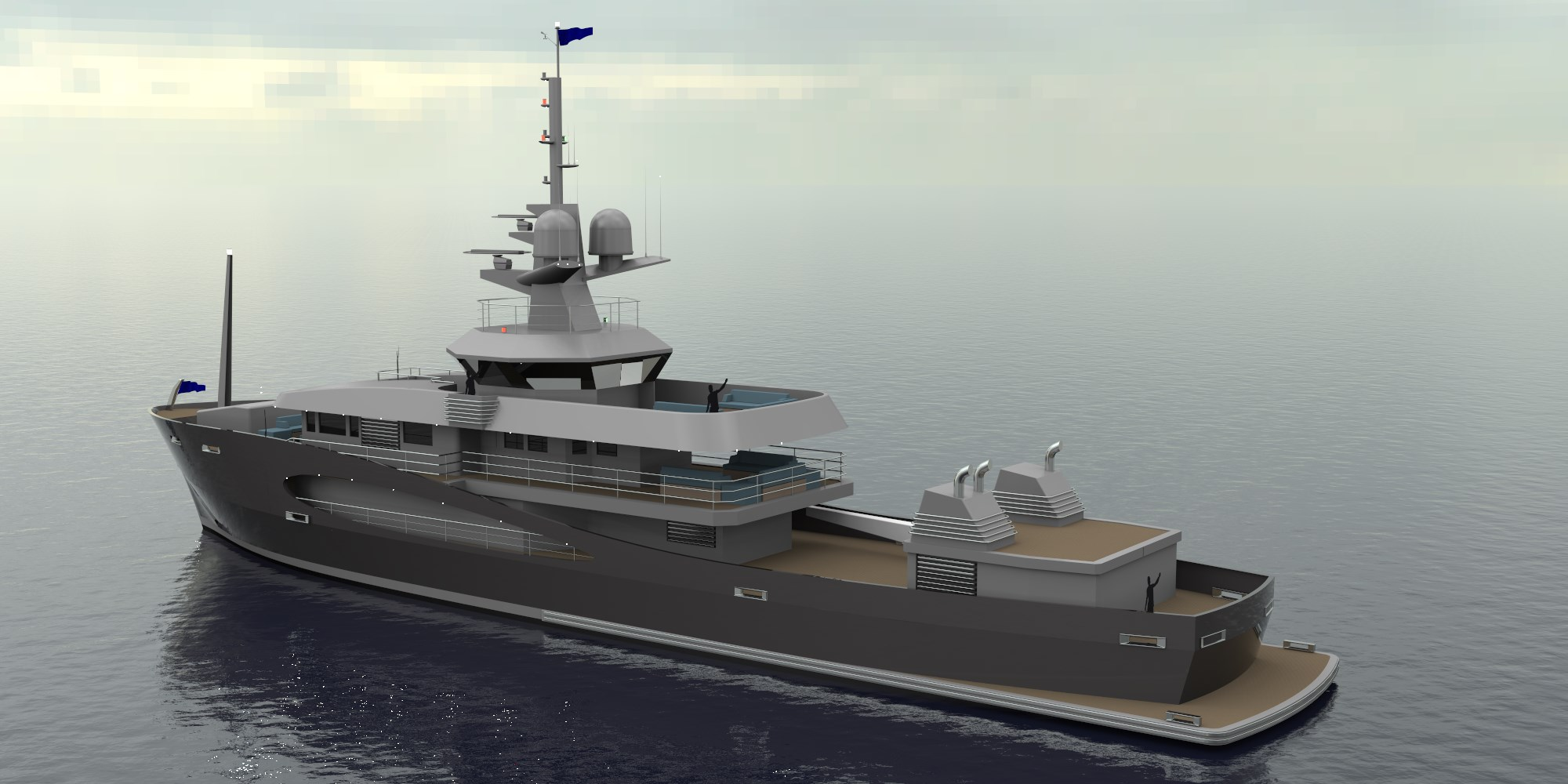
2018 Project Image Saint Christopher Yacht

== Conversion ==
In 2017, after the Saint Christopher completed its 5-year and 10-year surveys, and was no-longer required for commercial maritime operations by APFII.org, she was re-classified and re-registered as a private yacht, and given a New Zealand flag. Significant modifications were made, with new crew areas, new dining, recreational, and living spaces, as well as considerable hull and exterior work, and styling changes. Guest areas were laid out, and she was modified to carry up to 28 persons in high levels of comfort, covering both guests and crew. Her bow-thrusters were upgraded, and new ships' tenders were added. She is intended to be used in both Polar waters, but primarily the tropical climates of the South Pacific.

== Planned Features ==
- 6 guest cabins - accommodation for 12, average floor space, 86 square meters.
- Solar Powered interior and exterior electric systems, including LED lights and climate controls, for eco-friendly, ultra-long-range cruising.
- Interior main stair well and atrium, passing through four levels.
- Media Lounge, and 24-seat board room, for event coverage and media broadcasting.
- Sick-bay and medical center.
- 286 square meter owner's deck, with study, nursery, library, his/hers walk in wardrobes and bathrooms.
- Life saving equipment for 480 persons.
- Double Hulled, with an Ice Class-C rating (DNV)
- 400,000 litres (88,000 imp gal; 110,000 US gal) fuel capacity (formerly 680 cubic meters) giving 250,000-mile (220,000 nmi; 400,000 km) range on low fuel burn (7-8 knots).
- An experimental pyrolytic reactor, partially energised via solar power, to extend range.
- Single shaft 995 hp (742 kW) main engine with controllable pitch propeller, a 210kwE bow tunnel thruster, and a 810 hp (600 kW) retractable 360 degree Schottel secondary drive.
- 7.2 meter custom tender with a v8, 5.8 liter inboard petrol motor.
- 3.35m Novurania 335 DL Day-tender.
