= Otto Edholm =

British physiologist (1909–1985)

- Born: 1909
- Died: 18 January 1985 (aged 75–76)
- Education: St George's Hospital
- Known for: Effect of hot and cold climates, high altitudes and cold water immersion on the human body
- Scientific career
- Fields: Physiology

Otto Gustav Edholm (1909–1985) was a British physiologist who studied human responses to the environment. He was Professor of Physiology at the University of Western Ontario until 1947, when he was invited to head the Division of Human Physiology at the MRC National Institute of Medical Research at Hampstead. He was a leader in physiological research in the UK and his work was internationally recognised. The Otto Edholm award is given by The Chartered Institute of Ergonomics and Human Factors to significant contributions to the application of ergonomics/human factors. Edholm Point in Antarctica is named after him.

== Early life ==
Born in 1909, Edholm was educated at Tonbridge School and studied medicine at St George's Hospital.

== Career ==
He was appointed as a lecturer in physiology at Queen's University Belfast where he developed a partnership with Professor Henry Barcroft. In the Second World War, Edholm and Barcroft studied the circulatory changes in man caused by severe haemorrhage. From 1944 to 1947, he was Professor of Physiology at the Royal Veterinary College before becoming the Chair of Physiology at the University of Western Ontario. He was invited to set up a Division of Human Physiology for the Medical Research Council at the National Institute for Medical Research in Hampstead, where Edholm and his team investigated survival in hot and cold climates, and later studied high altitudes and cold water immersion.

Upon retiring in 1974, Edholm became visiting professor at the School of Environmental Studies (now the Bartlett School of Architecture) at UCL where he researched problems with the 'built environment'. He co-ordinated the medical research programme of the British Antarctic Survey and in 1970 was awarded the Bellinghausen Medal of the Antarctic Research Committee of the USSR. He died peacefully at his home in Hungerford on 18 January 1985.

== Books ==
- Man in a Cold Environment with Alan Burton (1955)
- Exploration Medicine with A. L. Bacharach (1965)
- The Physiology of Human Survival with A.L. Bacharach (1965)
- The Biology of Work (1967)
- The Physiology of Human Survival (1967)
- Polar Human Biology (1973)
- Man, Hot and Cold (1978)
- Principles and Practice of Human Physiology with Joe Weiner (1981)
- Man in his Thermal Environment with Ray Clark (1985)
