= Talbott Point =

Talbott Point (66°15′S 67°10′W) is the northern point of DuBois Island in the Biscoe Islands, off the coast of the Antarctic Peninsula. It was mapped from aerial photos taken by the Falkland Islands and Dependencies Aerial Survey Expedition (1956–57), and was named by the United Kingdom Antarctic Place-Names Committee after John H. Talbott, an American physiologist who specialized in the reactions of the human body to climatic environments.
