= DuBois Island =

Island in antarctica

Location of DuBois Island

DuBois Island (66°16′S 67°10′W) is one of the Biscoe Islands lying near the south end of the chain, and separated from Krogh Island on the east by the 0.54 nautical miles (1 km) wide Papazov Passage. It was mapped from air photos by the Falkland Islands and Dependencies Aerial Survey Expedition (1956–57), and named by the UK Antarctic Place-Names Committee for Eugene Floyd DuBois, an American physiologist who has specialized in the measurement of basic metabolism and studies in the regulation of body temperature in man.

== See also ==
- List of Antarctic and sub-Antarctic islands
- Talbott Point
