= Lavoisier Island =

Island in the Antarctic

- Location of Lavoisier Island

- Location in Antarctica

Geography
- Location: Antarctica
- Coordinates: 66°12′S 66°44′W
- Archipelago: Biscoe Islands
- Length: 29 km (18 mi)
- Width: 8 km (5 mi)

Administration
- Administered under the Antarctic Treaty System

Lavoisier Island is an island 29 km (18 mi) long and 8 km (5 mi) wide, lying between Rabot and Watkins Islands in the Biscoe Islands, Antarctica. It is separated from Renaud Island and Rabot Island to the northeast by Pendleton Strait, from Watkins Island to the southwest by Lewis Sound, and from Krogh Island to the west-southwest by Vladigerov Passage.

Lavoisier Island is named Isla Serrano by Chile and isla Mitre by Argentina.

The island was first charted by the French Antarctic Expedition, 1903–05, under Jean-Baptiste Charcot, and named "Ile Nansen" after Fridtjof Nansen, Norwegian Arctic explorer. To avoid confusion with Nansen Island (q.v.) in Wilhelmina Bay, the UK-APC recommended in 1960 that the island be renamed for Antoine Laurent Lavoisier, French chemist who pioneered the study of metabolism.

== Winslow Rock ==
Winslow Rock is a rock close off the east side of Lavoisier Island, Biscoe Islands. Mapped from surveys by Falkland Islands Dependencies Survey (FIDS) (1958–59). There is a small penguin rookery on this rock, which provides the only known landing place on the east side of Lavoisier Island. Named by United Kingdom Antarctic Place-Names Committee (UK-APC) for Charles E.A. Winslow, American physiologist who has specialized in the reactions of the human body to cold environments.

== See also ==
- List of Antarctic islands south of 60° S
