= Edholm Point =

Headland in Antarctica

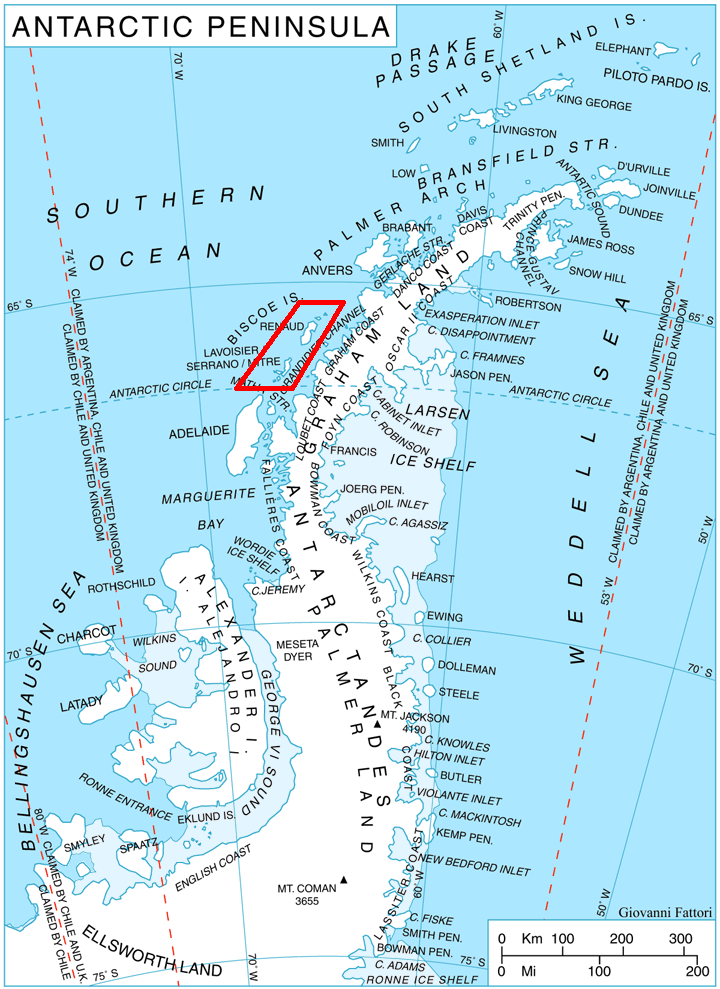
Location of Biscoe Islands in the Antarctic Peninsula region.

Edholm Point (66°15′S 67°4′W) is the northwestern point of Krogh Island in the Biscoe Islands, Antarctica forming the west side of the entrance to Transmarisca Bay.

The point was mapped from air photos by the Falkland Islands and Dependencies Aerial Survey Expedition (1956–57), and was named by the UK Antarctic Place-Names Committee for Otto Edholm, a British physiologist who was Head of the Division of Human Physiology of the National Institute for Medical Research since its foundation in 1949, and who specialized in studies of the effects of cold on man.

In 2021 one of Otto Edholm's grandchildren set up an ice-cream company called Edholm Point Ice-Cream.

www.edholmpointicecream.com

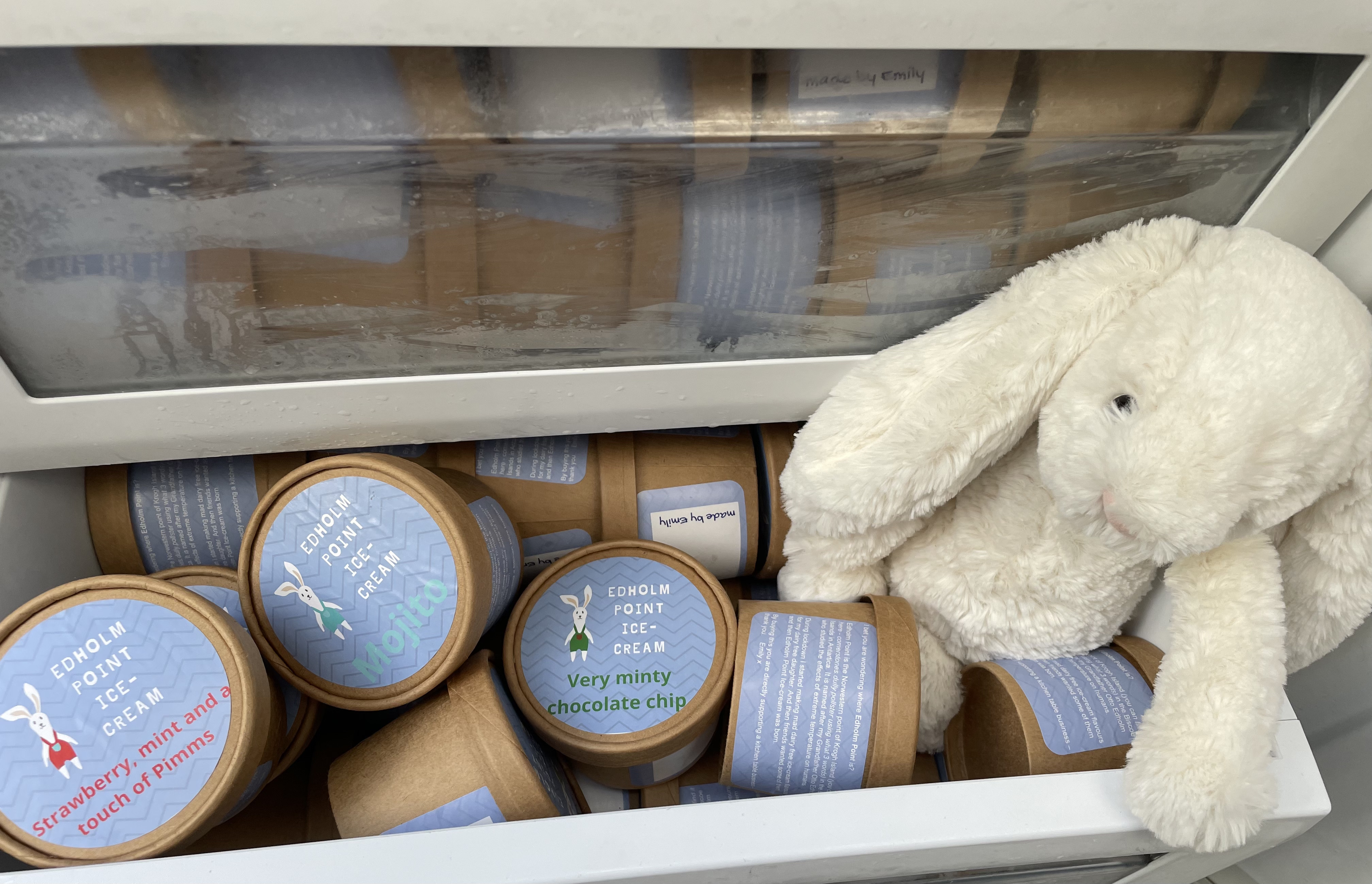
