= Krogh Island =

Island in Antarctica

Location of Krogh Island in Biscoe Islands

Krogh Island (66°17′S 67°0′W) is an ice-covered island about 5 nautical miles (9 km) long lying close west of the southern part of Lavoisier Island in Biscoe Islands, Antarctica. The island is separated from Lavoisier Island on the east by Vladigerov Passage, from DuBois Island on the west by Papazov Passage and from Watkins Island to the south by Lewis Sound. Its north coast is indented by Transmarisca Bay and Suregetes Cove.

The island was mapped from air photos taken by the Falkland Islands and Dependencies Aerial Survey Expedition (1956–57), and was named by the UK Antarctic Place-Names Committee for August Krogh, a Danish physiologist who specialized in the functional activity of the capillaries, and was a pioneer of studies of human metabolism and blood circulation in cold climates.

== See also ==
- List of Antarctic and sub-Antarctic islands
