= Krivus Island =

Island in Antarctica

- Location within Antarctica Location within Antarctic Peninsula

Geography
- Location: Antarctica
- Coordinates: 65°25′53″S 65°23′05″W
- Archipelago: Biscoe Islands

Administration
- Administered under the Antarctic Treaty System

Demographics
- Population: Uninhabited

Krivus Island (Bulgarian: остров Кривус, romanized: ostrov Krivus, IPA: [ˈɔstrof ˈkrivos]) is the mostly ice-covered island on the east side of Johannessen Harbour in the Pitt group of Biscoe Islands, Antarctica. The feature extends 920 m in north-south direction and 1.06 km in east-west direction.

The island is named after the medieval fortress of Krivus in Southern Bulgaria.

== Location ==
Krivus Island is located at 65°25′53″S 65°23′05″W, 1.15 km south-southwest of Vaugondy Island, 1.23 km west of Jingle Island, 730 m west-northwest of Tambra Island, 910 m north of Weller Island and 2.05 km east of Snodgrass Island. British mapping in 1971.

== Maps ==
- British Antarctic Territory: Graham Coast. Scale 1:200000 topographic map. DOS 610 Series, Sheet W 65 64. Directorate of Overseas Surveys, UK, 1971.
- Antarctic Digital Database (ADD). Scale 1:250000 topographic map of Antarctica. Scientific Committee on Antarctic Research (SCAR). Since 1993, regularly upgraded and updated.
