= Plakuder Point =

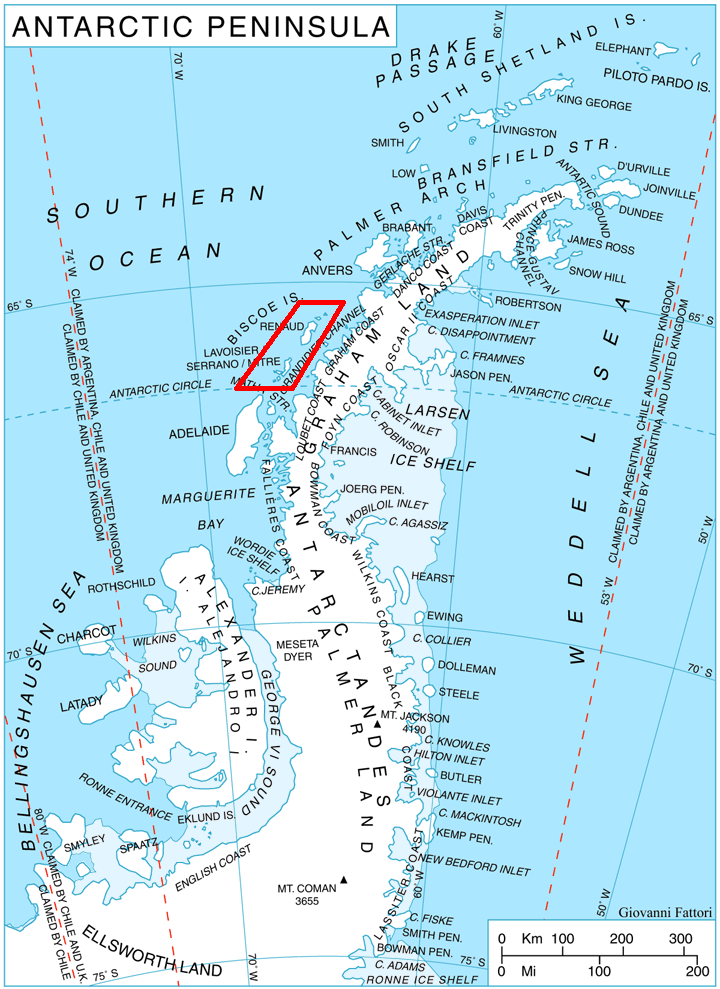
Location of Biscoe Islands in the Antarctic Peninsula region.

Plakuder Point (Bulgarian: нос Плакудер, ‘Nos Plakuder’ \'nos 'pla-ku-der\) is the point on the east side of the entrance to Misionis Bay on the northeast coast of Pickwick Island in the Pitt group of Biscoe Islands, Antarctica.

The point is named after the settlement of Plakuder in Northwestern Bulgaria.

== Location ==
Plakuder Point is located at 65°27′53″S 65°32′26″W, which is 1.6 km east-southeast of Kusev Point and 1.6 km west-southwest of Snodgrass Island. British mapping in 1971.

== Maps ==
- British Antarctic Territory: Graham Coast. Scale 1:200000 topographic map. DOS 610 Series, Sheet W 65 64. Directorate of Overseas Surveys, UK, 1971.
- Antarctic Digital Database (ADD). Scale 1:250000 topographic map of Antarctica. Scientific Committee on Antarctic Research (SCAR), 1993–2016.
