= Kusev Point =

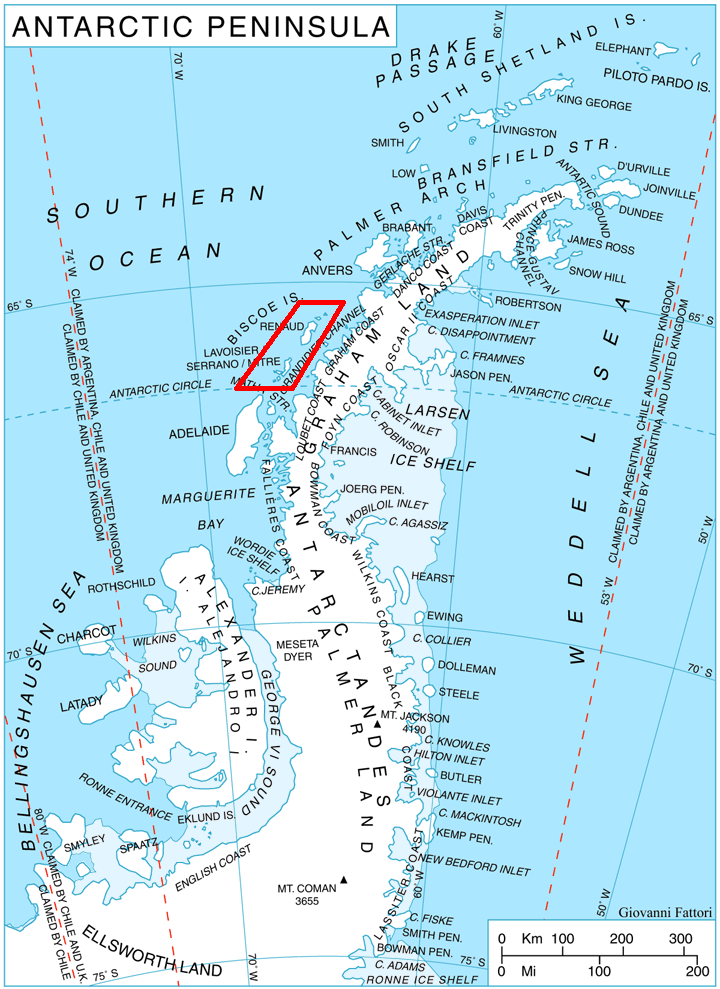
Location of Biscoe Islands in the Antarctic Peninsula region.

Kusev Point (Bulgarian: Кусев нос, ‘Kusev Nos’ \'ku-sev 'nos\) is the point forming the north extremity of Pickwick Island and the west side of the entrance to Misionis Bay in the Pitt group of Biscoe Islands, Antarctica.

The point is named after Metropolitan Metodiy Kusev (1838-1922), a leader in the struggle for Bulgarian Church autocephaly and national unification.

== Location ==
Kusev Point is located at 65°27′37″S 65°34′23″W, which is 1.6 km south of Sawyer Island and 1.6 km west-northwest of Plakuder Point. British mapping in 1971.

== Maps ==
- British Antarctic Territory: Graham Coast. Scale 1:200000 topographic map. DOS 610 Series, Sheet W 65 64. Directorate of Overseas Surveys, UK, 1971.
- Antarctic Digital Database (ADD). Scale 1:250000 topographic map of Antarctica. Scientific Committee on Antarctic Research (SCAR). Since 1993, regularly upgraded and updated.
