= Winkle Island (Antarctica) =

Island in Antarctica

- Location of Winkle Island

- Location within Antarctic Peninsula Location within Antarctica

Geography
- Location: Antarctica
- Coordinates: 65°31′S 65°39′W
- Archipelago: Biscoe Islands

Administration
- Administered under the Antarctic Treaty System

Demographics
- Population: 0

Winkle Island is the island lying between Tula Point and Pickwick Island, Pitt Islands, in the Biscoe Islands. It is separated from Renaud Island to the southwest by Mraka Sound.

The island was shown on an Argentine government chart of 1957. It was named by the UK-APC in 1959 after Nathaniel Winkle, a member of the Pickwick Club in Charles Dickens' Pickwick Papers.

== Location ==
Winkle Island is located at 65°31′S 65°39′W, 600 m southeast of Pickwick Island, 2.2 km west-southwest of Arrowsmith Island, and 500 m north of the small peninsula ending in Tula Point, Renaud Island. British mapping in 1971.

== Maps ==
- British Antarctic Territory: Graham Coast. Scale 1:200000 topographic map. DOS 610 Series, Sheet W 65 64. Directorate of Overseas Surveys, UK, 1971.
- Antarctic Digital Database (ADD). Scale 1:250000 topographic map of Antarctica. Scientific Committee on Antarctic Research (SCAR). Since 1993, regularly upgraded and updated.
