= Wardle Entrance =

Harbor channel in Graham Land, Antarctica

Wardle Entrance (65°27′S 65°26′W) is a small southeast entrance to Johannessen Harbour, lying between Snodgrass and Weller Islands, Pitt Islands, in the Biscoe Islands. Photographed by Hunting Aerosurveys Ltd. in 1956 and mapped from these photos by the Falkland Islands Dependencies Survey (FIDS). Named by the United Kingdom Antarctic Place-Names Committee (UK-APC) after one of the central characters in Charles Dickens' Pickwick Papers.
