= Clements Island =

Antarctic island

Clements Island (65°56′S 66°0′W) is an island 1 nautical mile (2 km) long lying immediately south of Rabot Island in the Biscoe Islands. The French Antarctic Expedition, 1903–05, under Jean-Baptiste Charcot, gave the name Ile Clements Markham for Sir Clements Markham, President of the Royal Geographical Society, 1893–1905. Charcot applied this name to an incompletely defined island northeast of Renaud Island, in what is now the Pitt Islands. The recommended application, however, is based upon the map of the British Graham Land Expedition, 1934–37, which provided a more reliable chart of the area. The first part of the name, rather than the last, has been retained to distinguish this feature from Markham Island in Terra Nova Bay, Victoria Land.

== See also ==
- List of Antarctic and sub-Antarctic islands
