= Vaugondy Island =

Island in Antarctica

- Map of Pitt Islands

- Location within Antarctic Peninsula Location within Antarctica

Geography
- Location: Antarctica
- Coordinates: 65°24′37″S 65°21′47″W
- Archipelago: Biscoe Islands

Administration
- Administered under the Antarctic Treaty System

Demographics
- Population: Uninhabited

Vaugondy Island (Bulgarian: остров Вогонди, romanized: ostrov Vogondi, IPA: [ˈɔstrov voɡonˈdi]) is a mostly ice-covered island on the northeast side of Johannessen Harbour in the Pitt group of Biscoe Islands, Antarctica. The feature extends 1.85 km in north-south direction and 1.68 km in east-west.

The island is named after the French cartographer Didier Robert de Vaugondy (1723-1786) who published a map of the south polar region in 1777.

== Location ==
Vaugondy Island is located 2.78 km west-southwest of Trundle Island, 1.1 km northwest of Jingle Island, 2.08 km east of Animas Island and 3.4 km south of Ribnik Island. British mapping in 1971.

== Maps ==
- British Antarctic Territory: Graham Coast. Scale 1:200000 topographic map. DOS 610 Series, Sheet W 65 64. Directorate of Overseas Surveys, UK, 1971.
- Antarctic Digital Database (ADD). Scale 1:250000 topographic map of Antarctica. Scientific Committee on Antarctic Research (SCAR). Since 1993, regularly upgraded and updated.
