= Heap Island =

Island in Antarctica

Heap Island (65°50′S 65°43′W) is an island off the southeast coast of Renaud Island in the Biscoe Islands of the Graham Coast of Antarctica, between Jurva Point and Bates Island. In association with the names of sea-ice specialists grouped in this area, it was named by the UK Antarctic Place-Names Committee (UK-APC) in 1985 after John A. Heap, a sea-ice specialist with the Falkland Islands Dependencies Survey (FIDS), 1955–62, who worked in the Antarctic with FIDS, 1955–56, with the Commonwealth Trans-Antarctic Expedition, 1956–57, and with the United States Antarctic Research Program, 1962–63. He was later head of the Polar Regions Section at the Foreign and Commonwealth Office, and a member of the UK-APC from 1976.

== See also ==
- List of Antarctic and sub-Antarctic islands
