= Tambra Island =

Island in Antarctica

- Location within Antarctica Location within Antarctic Peninsula

Geography
- Location: Antarctica
- Coordinates: 65°26′05″S 65°21′00″W
- Archipelago: Biscoe Islands

Administration
- Administered under the Antarctic Treaty System

Demographics
- Population: Uninhabited

Tambra Island (Bulgarian: остров Тъмбра, romanized: ostrov Tambra, IPA: [ˈɔstrof ˈtɤmbrɐ]) is a mostly ice-covered island in the Pitt group of Biscoe Islands, Antarctica. The feature is 1.17 km long in southwest–northeast direction and 700 m wide, and is separated from the adjacent Jingle Island to the northeast by a 60 m wide passage.

The island is named after Tambra Hill in Southern Bulgaria.

== Location ==
Tambra Island is located at 65°26′05″S 65°21′00″W, 700 m northeast of Weller Island and 730 m east-southeast of Krivus Island. British mapping in 1971.

== Maps ==
- British Antarctic Territory: Graham Coast. Scale 1:200000 topographic map. DOS 610 Series, Sheet W 65 64. Directorate of Overseas Surveys, UK, 1971.
- Antarctic Digital Database (ADD). Scale 1:250000 topographic map of Antarctica. Scientific Committee on Antarctic Research (SCAR). Since 1993, regularly upgraded and updated.
