= Knezha Island =

Island in Antarctica

- Location within Antarctic Peninsula

Geography
- Location: Antarctica
- Coordinates: 65°21′28″S 65°22′02″W
- Archipelago: Biscoe Islands

Administration
- Administered under the Antarctic Treaty System

Demographics
- Population: 0

Knezha Island (Bulgarian: остров Кнежа, romanized: ostrov Knezha, IPA: [ˈɔstrof knɛˈʒa]) is the northernmost island in the Pitt group of Biscoe Islands, Antarctica. The feature extends 900 m in north-south direction and 880 m in east-west direction.

The island is named after the town of Knezha in Northern Bulgaria.

== Location ==
Knezha Island is located at 65°21′28″S 65°22′02″W, 4.53 km northwest of Trundle Island, 780 m north-northwest of Ribnik Island and 2.62 km southeast of Bardell Rock. British mapping in 1971.

== Maps ==
- British Antarctic Territory: Graham Coast. Scale 1:200000 topographic map. DOS 610 Series, Sheet W 65 64. Directorate of Overseas Surveys, UK, 1971.
- Antarctic Digital Database (ADD). Scale 1:250000 topographic map of Antarctica. Scientific Committee on Antarctic Research (SCAR). Since 1993, regularly upgraded and updated.
