= Kereka Island =

Antarctic island

- Location within Antarctic Peninsula

Geography
- Location: Antarctica
- Coordinates: 65°29′38″S 65°25′20″W
- Archipelago: Biscoe Islands

Administration
- Administered under the Antarctic Treaty System

Demographics
- Population: 0

Kereka Island (Bulgarian: остров Керека, romanized: ostrov Kereka, IPA: [ˈɔstrof kɛˈrɛkɐ]) is a mostly ice-covered island in the Pitt group of Biscoe Islands, Antarctica. It is 1.75 km long in southeast-northwest direction and 580 m wide, and is separated from neighbouring Slumkey Island to the west-southwest by an 80 m wide passage.

The island is named after the settlement of Kereka in Northern Bulgaria.

== Location ==
Kereka Island is located at 65°29′38″S 65°25′20″W, 3.15 km south of Snodgrass Island and 4.4 km northwest of Lacuna Island. British mapping in 1971.

== Maps ==
- British Antarctic Territory: Graham Coast. Scale 1:200000 topographic map. DOS 610 Series, Sheet W 65 64. Directorate of Overseas Surveys, UK, 1971.
- Antarctic Digital Database (ADD). Scale 1:250000 topographic map of Antarctica. Scientific Committee on Antarctic Research (SCAR). Since 1993, regularly upgraded and updated.
