= Zukriegel Island =

Island in Antarctica

- Location of Zukriegel Island

- Location in Antarctica Zukriegel Island (Antarctica)

Geography
- Location: Antarctica
- Coordinates: 65°54′S 65°48′W

Administration
- Administered under the Antarctic Treaty System

Demographics
- Population: Uninhabited

Zukriegel Island is an island 1.9 km (1 nmi) long, lying between Rabot Island and Hennessy Islands, in the Biscoe Islands. First accurately shown on an Argentine government chart of 1957. Named by the United Kingdom Antarctic Place-Names Committee (UK-APC) in 1959 for Josef Zukriegel, Czechoslovak geographer who specialized in sea ice studies.

== See also ==
- List of Antarctic and sub-Antarctic islands
