= Bardell Rock =

Bardell Rock (65°20′S 65°23′W) is a rock nearly 1 nautical mile (1.9 km) south of Dickens Rocks in the Pitt Islands, northern Biscoe Islands. It was named by the UK Antarctic Place-Names Committee in 1971 after Mrs. Bardell, a character in Charles Dickens' The Pickwick Papers.
