= Fizkin Island =

Island in Antarctica

Location of Fizkin Island in the Pitt Islands.

Fizkin Island (65°31′S 65°31′W) is an island lying 2.5 nautical miles (5 km) southeast of Pickwick Island and 900 m southeast of Arrowsmith Island, Pitt Islands in the Biscoe Islands, Antarctica. The island was shown on an Argentine government chart of 1957, and named by the UK Antarctic Place-Names Committee in 1959 after Horatio Fizkin, Esquire, a character in Charles Dickens' The Pickwick Papers.

== See also ==
- List of Antarctic and sub-Antarctic islands
