= Jinks Island =

Island in the Biscoe Islands, Antarctica

Location of Jinks Island in the Pitt Islands

Jinks Island (65°22′S 65°38′W) is an island lying 5 nautical miles (9 km) north of Pickwick Island, in the Pitt Islands of the Biscoe Islands, Antarctica. Shown on an Argentine government chart of 1957, it was named by the UK Antarctic Place-Names Committee in 1959 after Mr. Jinks, a character in Charles Dickens' The Pickwick Papers.

== See also ==
- List of Antarctic and sub-Antarctic islands
