= Ribnik Island =

Island in Antarctica

- Location within Antarctic Peninsula

Geography
- Location: Antarctica
- Coordinates: 65°22′05″S 65°21′34″W
- Archipelago: Biscoe Islands

Administration
- Administered under the Antarctic Treaty System

Demographics
- Population: 0

Ribnik Island (Bulgarian: остров Рибник, romanized: ostrov Ribnik, IPA: [ˈɔstrof ˈribnik]) is a mostly ice-covered island in the Pitt group of Biscoe Islands, Antarctica. The feature is 1 km long in southwest-northeast direction and 500 m wide.

The island is named after the settlement of Ribnik in Southwestern Bulgaria.

== Location ==
Ribnik Island is located at 65°22′05″S 65°21′34″W, 780 m south-southeast of Knezha Island, 3.35 km northwest of Trundle Island and 3.4 km north of Vaugondy Island. British mapping in 1971.

== Maps ==
- British Antarctic Territory: Graham Coast. Scale 1:200000 topographic map. DOS 610 Series, Sheet W 65 64. Directorate of Overseas Surveys, UK, 1971.
- Antarctic Digital Database (ADD). Scale 1:250000 topographic map of Antarctica. Scientific Committee on Antarctic Research (SCAR). Since 1993, regularly upgraded and updated.
