= Arrowsmith Island =

Island in Antarctica

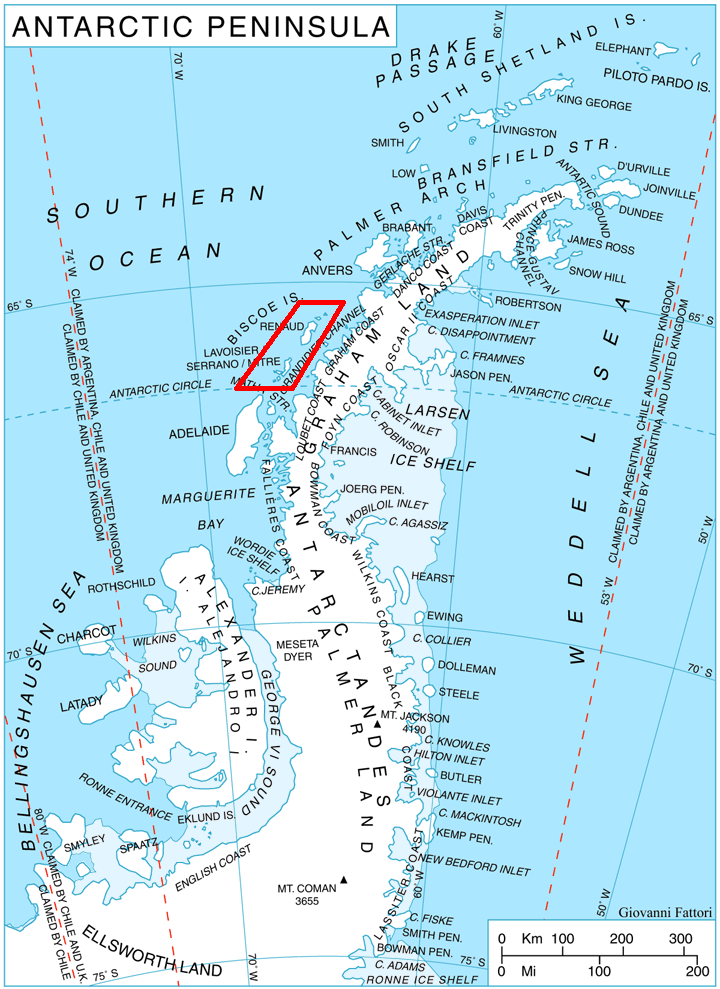
- Location of Biscoe Islands in the Antarctic Peninsula region

- Location within Antarctica Location within Antarctic Peninsula

Geography
- Location: Antarctica
- Coordinates: 65°30′28″S 65°32′09″W
- Archipelago: Biscoe Islands

Administration
- Administered under the Antarctic Treaty System

Demographics
- Population: Uninhabited

Arrowsmith Island (Bulgarian: остров Ароусмит, romanized: otrov Arousmit, IPA: [ˈɔstrof ˈarousmit]) is a mostly ice-covered island in the Pitt group of Biscoe Islands, Antarctica. It is 2.53 km long in west-southwest to east-northeast direction and 900 m wide.

The island is named after the British cartographer Aaron Arrowsmith (1750-1823) who published a map of the south polar region in 1794.

== Location ==
Arrowsmith Island is located at 65°30′28″S 65°32′09″W, 1.43 km southeast of Pickwick Island, 500 m south of Tupman Island and 900 m northwest of Fizkin Island. British mapping in 1971.

== Maps ==
- British Antarctic Territory: Graham Coast. Scale 1:200000 topographic map. DOS 610 Series, Sheet W 65 64. Directorate of Overseas Surveys, UK, 1971.
- Antarctic Digital Database (ADD). Scale 1:250000 topographic map of Antarctica. Scientific Committee on Antarctic Research (SCAR). Since 1993, regularly upgraded and updated.
