= Smiggers Island =

Island in Antarctica

Smiggers Island (65°27′S 65°21′W) is an island lying 1 nautical mile (1.9 km) southeast of Weller Island, Pitt Islands, in the Biscoe Islands. Photographed by Hunting Aerosurveys Ltd. in 1956, and mapped from these photos by the Falkland Islands Dependencies Survey (FIDS). Named by the United Kingdom Antarctic Place-Names Committee (UK-APC) in 1959 after Joseph Smiggers, Esquire, Perpetual Vice President of the Pickwick Club in Charles Dickens' Pickwick Papers.

== See also ==
- List of Antarctic and sub-Antarctic islands
