= Snubbin Island =

Island in Antarctica

Coordinates: 65°29′S 65°50′W

Location of Snubbin Island

Snubbin Island is an island lying 2 nautical miles (3.7 km) west of Pickwick Island at the western end of the Pitt Islands, in the Biscoe Islands. Shown on an Argentine government chart of 1957. Named by the United Kingdom Antarctic Place-Names Committee (UK-APC) in 1959 after Mr. Serjeant Snubbin, a barrister in Charles Dickens' Pickwick Papers.

== See also ==
- List of Antarctic and sub-Antarctic islands
