= Nupkins Island =

Island near Antarctica

Coordinates: 65°26′S 65°41′W

Location of Nupkins Island

Nupkins Island is an island lying 3 nautical miles (6 km) west of Sawyer Island, Pitt Islands, in the Biscoe Islands. Shown on an Argentine government chart of 1957. Named by the United Kingdom Antarctic Place-Names Committee (UK-APC) after George Nupkins, Esquire, the principal magistrate in Charles Dickens' Pickwick Papers.

== See also ==
- List of Antarctic and sub-Antarctic islands
