= Misionis Bay =

Bay in Antarctica

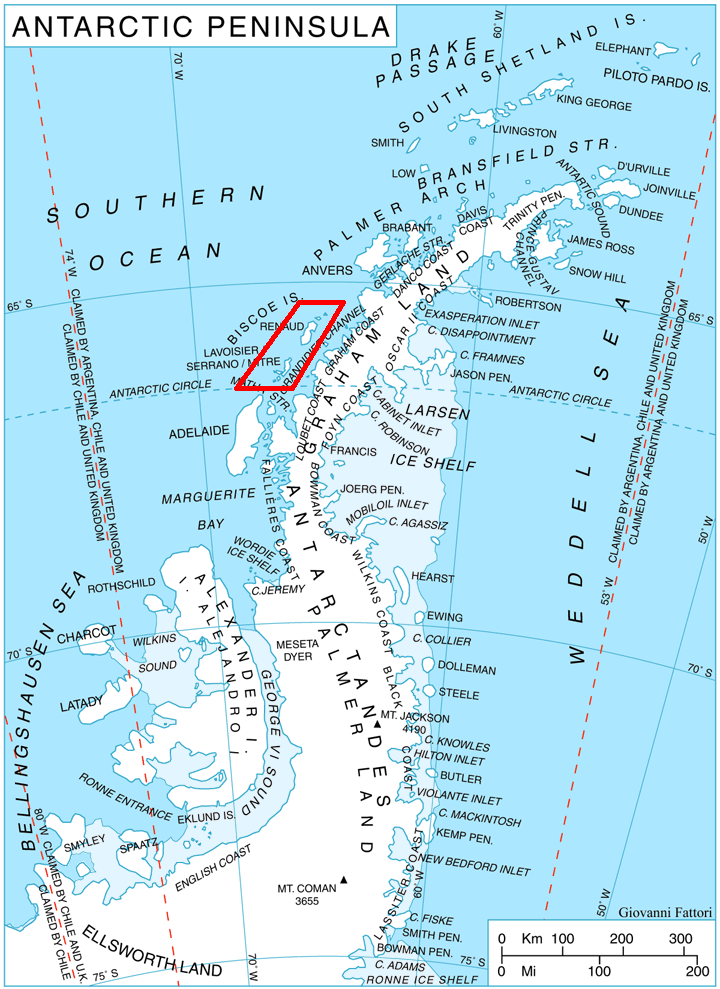
Location of Biscoe Islands in the Antarctic Peninsula region.

Misionis Bay (Bulgarian: залив Мисионис, ‘Zaliv Misionis’ \'za-liv mi-si-'o-nis\) is a 1.6km wide bay indenting for 2.35km the northeast coast of Pickwick Island in the Pitt group of Biscoe Islands, Antarctica. It is entered east of Kusev Point and west of Plakuder Point.

The bay is named after the ancient and medieval town of Misionis in Northeastern Bulgaria.

== Location ==
Misionis Bay is centred at 65°28′25″S 65°34′15″W. British mapping in 1971.

== Maps ==
- British Antarctic Territory: Graham Coast. Scale 1:200000 topographic map. DOS 610 Series, Sheet W 65 64. Directorate of Overseas Surveys, UK, 1971.
- Antarctic Digital Database (ADD). Scale 1:250000 topographic map of Antarctica. Scientific Committee on Antarctic Research (SCAR). Since 1993, regularly upgraded and updated.
