= Slumkey Island =

Location of Slumkey Island

Slumkey Island (65°30′S 65°28′W) is the largest island of the group lying east of Tupman Island, Pitt Islands, in the Biscoe Islands, Antarctica. It is separated from neighbouring Kereka Island to the east-northeast by an 80 m wide passage.

The island was first accurately shown on an Argentine government chart of 1957. Named by the United Kingdom Antarctic Place-Names Committee (UK-APC) in 1959 after the Honorable Samuel Slumkey, a character in Charles Dickens' Pickwick Papers.

== See also ==
- List of Antarctic and sub-Antarctic islands
