= Speerschneider Point =

Speerschneider Point (65°45′S 66°10′W) is a point on Belogushev Island forming the west side of the entrance to Malmgren Bay on the west side of Renaud Island, in the Biscoe Islands. First accurately shown on an Argentine government chart of 1957. Named by the United Kingdom Antarctic Place-Names Committee (UK-APC) in 1959 for C.I.H. Speerschneider, Danish meteorologist, who was editor of the annual reports on the state of the sea ice in the Arctic issued by Dansk Meteorologisk Institut, 1910–34.
