= Tony Weller =

Fictional character in The Pickwick Papers

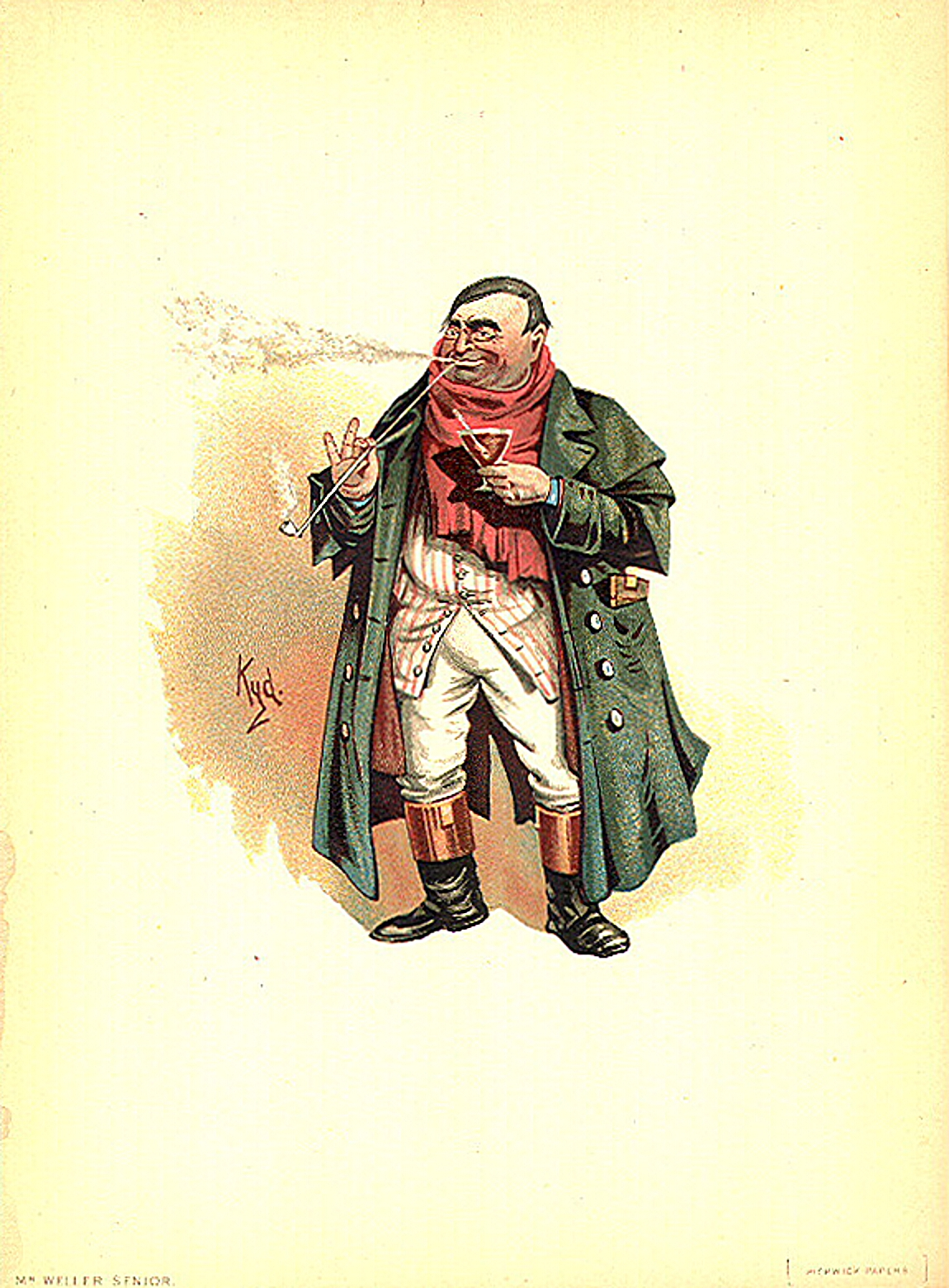
Tony Weller - Joseph Clayton Clarke (1889)

Tony Weller is a fictional character in Charles Dickens's first novel, The Pickwick Papers (1836-37). The irresponsible and care-free Tony Weller is Sam Weller's father. A loquacious coachman, the character never became as popular as his famous son but readers have always enjoyed his quaint humour and his even quainter philosophy.

== Character ==
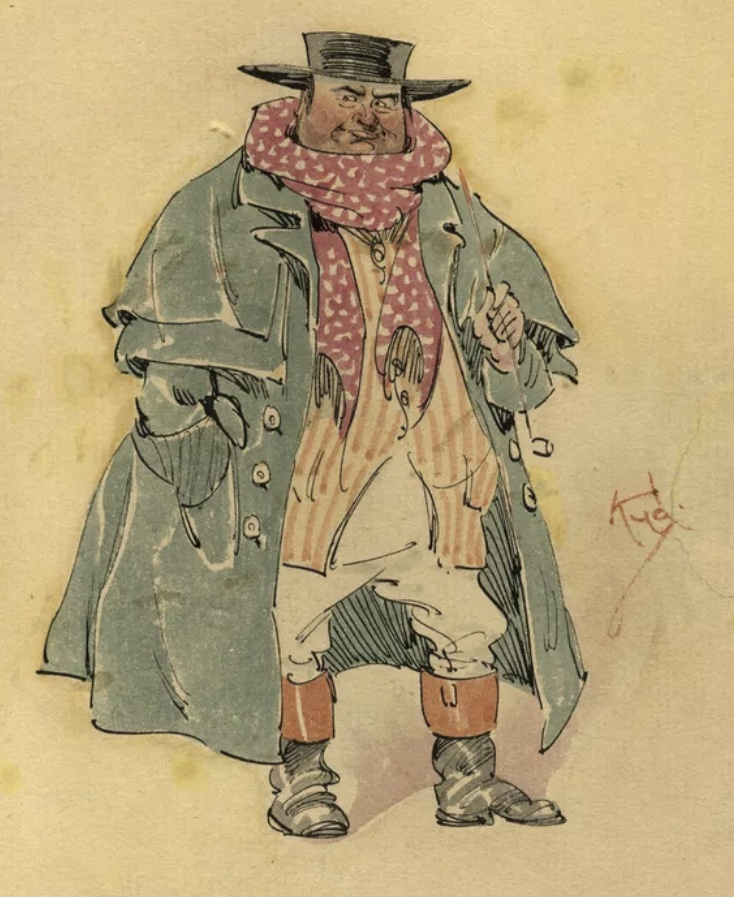
Tony Weller by 'Kyd'

Tony Weller shares various characteristics with Mr Pickwick: both are advanced in years; both are fat, and both are kind and generous. Similarly, the two are innocents in affairs of the heart, with both being troubled by widows. It cannot be a coincidence that Dickens introduces Tony Weller soon after Mrs Bardell brings a court action against Pickwick for breach of promise. Unlike Pickwick, Tony Weller marries his troublesome widow, Susan, and his consequent miserable marriage causes him to give the advice to his son to “Beware o’ the widders":

'Widders, Sammy,' replied Mr. Weller, slightly changing colour. 'Widders are 'ceptions to ev'ry rule. I have heerd how many ordinary women one widder's equal to in pint o' comin' over you. I think it's five-and-twenty, but I don't rightly know vether it ain't more.'

Weller Senior and Pickwick are dissimilar, in that, unlike Pickwick, Tony Weller takes few responsibilities in life, and has been an absent father to his son, taking no share in his upbringing, leaving the young Sam Weller to run the streets from a young age. Tony Weller uses his job as a coachman, necessitating frequent absences, as an excuse for his poor parenting and for being a poor husband to Sam's late mother. He is also a poor husband to his second wife when he allows her to maintain her association with the hypocritical minister Stiggins. Pickwick is the father to Sam Weller that Tony Weller never was.

Despite not having seen each other for two years, and despite his shortcomings as a father, Sam and Tony Weller have an affection for each other which increases as the novel progresses. As Mr Pickwick becomes more of a father-figure to Sam, so Sam's relationship with his father also changes; and while he cannot accept Tony Weller as either a figure of authority or a father-figure in the same way as he can Pickwick, the two are fond of each other and become more like brothers or good friends.

== Appearances in Pickwick Papers ==
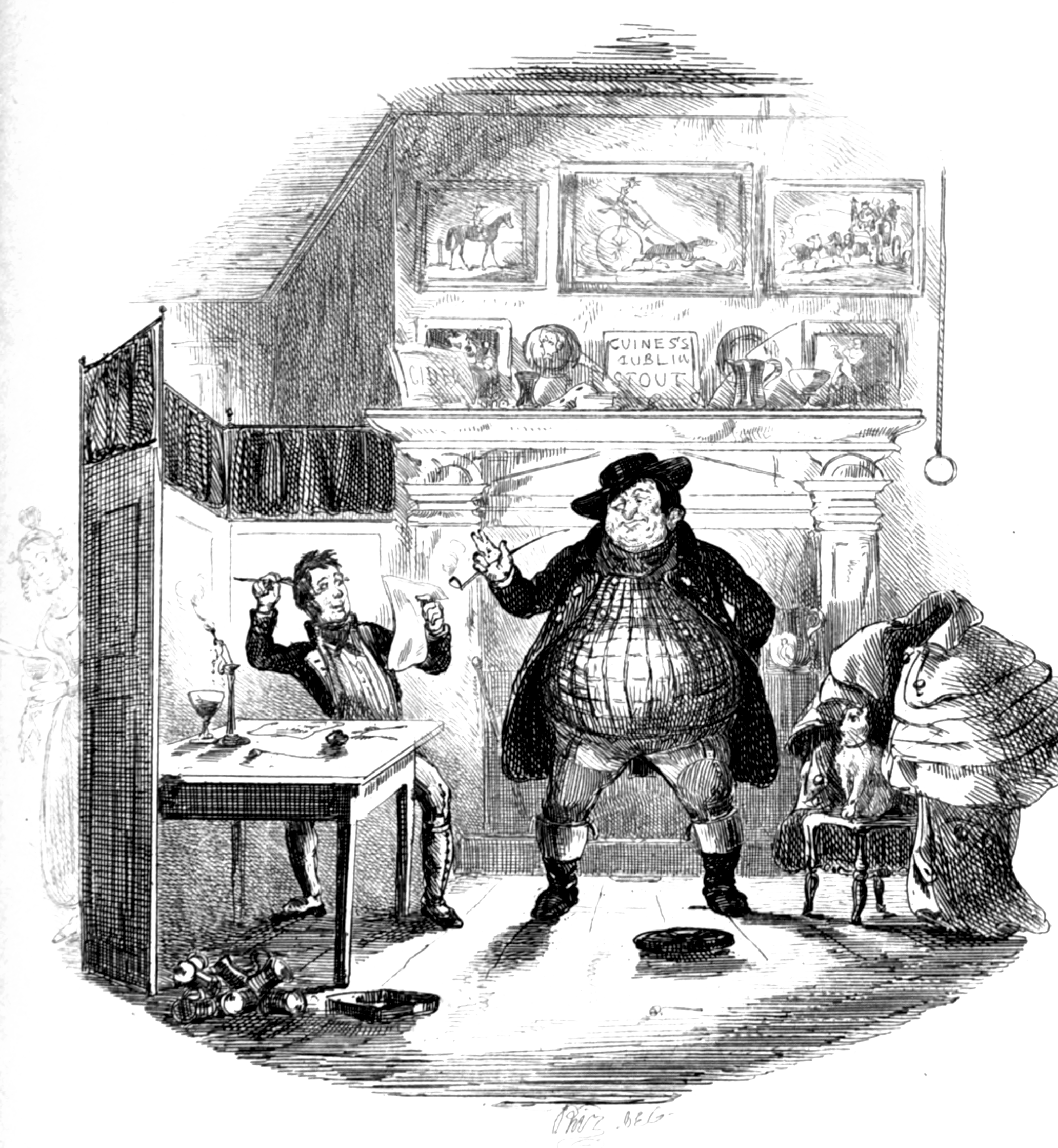
Sam Weller and his father Tony Weller discuss writing a Valentine - Hablot Knight Browne (March 1837)

Tony Wellers appears late in The Pickwick Papers, making his entrance in March 1837, in the humorous scene 'The Valentine' where Sam Weller is writing a Valentine for his sweetheart Mary, the pretty housemaid he eventually marries. Having trouble composing his Valentine's Card, Sam consults his father:

"Feel myself ashamed, and completely cir –” I forget what this here word is', said Sam, scratching his head with the pen, in vain attempts to remember.

'Why don’t you look at it then?', inquired Mr Weller.

'So I am a lookin' at it', replied Sam, 'but there’s another blot. Here’s a “c”, and an “i”, and a “d”'.

'Circumwented, p’raps', suggested Mr Weller.

`'No, it ain’t that,' said Sam, 'circumscribed; that’s it.'

'That ain’t as good a word as circumwented, Sammy,' said Mr Weller, gravely.

Tony Weller appears just four times in The Pickwick Papers, with each being in the second half of the novel, in the monthly instalments originally published between March and November 1837. Yet such was his impact that he quickly became a popular subject for all sorts of merchandise including busts, mugs, and on advertising, being a nostalgic reminder of the Regency era in the days before railway.

== Cockney dialect ==
As shown in the extract above, in the novel the Wellers, father and son, speak a form of Cockney English prevalent in London's East End in 1836, pronouncing a "v" where there should be a "w", and "w” where there should be a "v" - "wery" instead of "very" and "avay" instead of "away" - in language that was outdated just 40 years after the novel's publication.

== Marriage and after ==
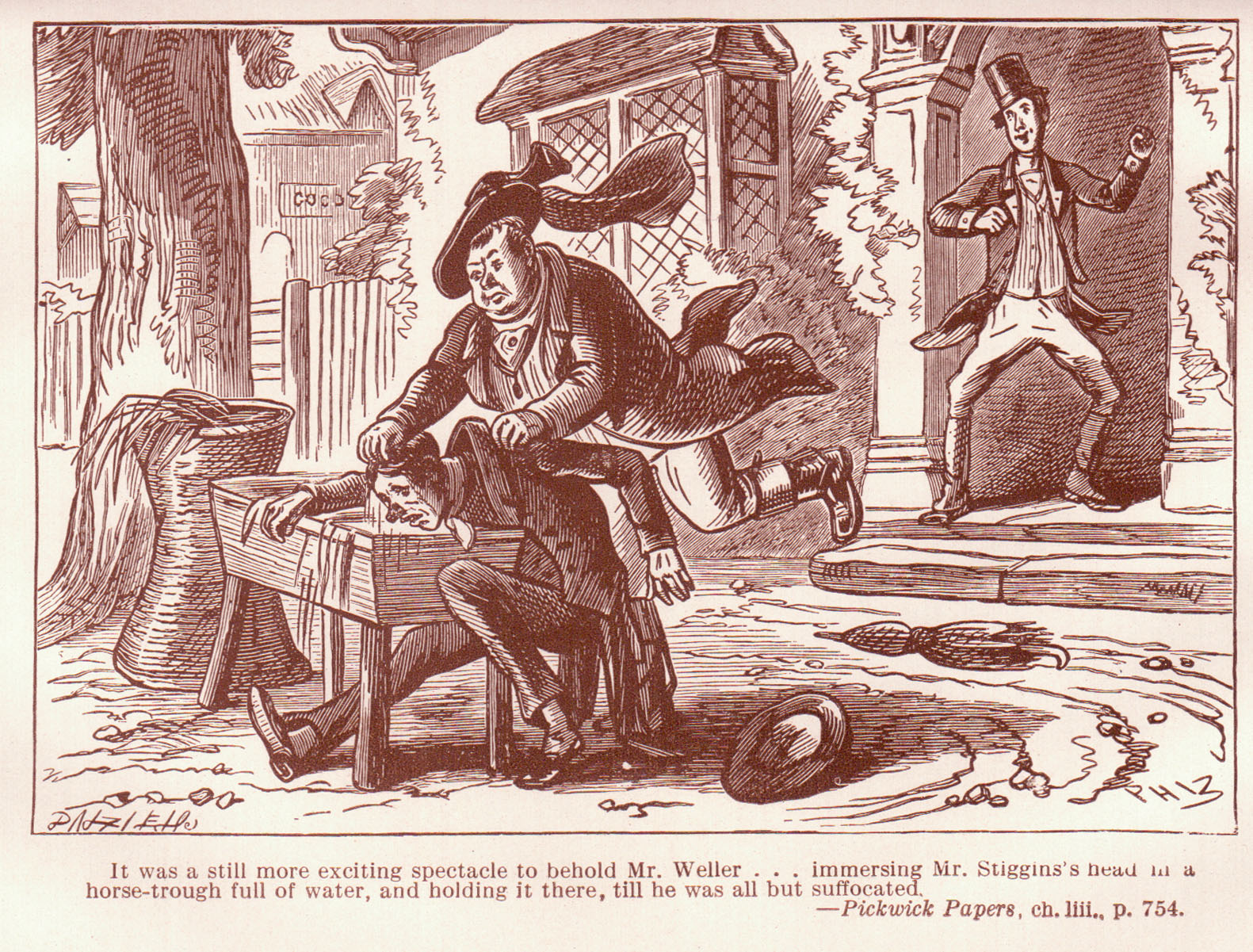
Tony Weller 'baptises' Stiggins - 1911 illustration

Later in the novel, Tony Weller marries Susan, a large and comfortable woman, who is the landlady of The Marquis of Granby public house in Dorking in Surrey. She is under the baleful influence of the Reverend Stiggins, the red-nosed, alcoholic and hypocritical Nonconformist minister at the local United Grand Junction, Ebenezer Temperance Association. Stiggins is inadvertently the cause of death of the second Mrs Weller when she is forced to sit for hours on the grass in the rain while he sermonized for hours, causing her to catch a heavy cold. After her death the greedy Stiggins arrived at the door of the inn, confidently expecting a bequest in her will. Such is Tony Weller's outrage that he roughly manhandles Stiggins and 'baptises' him by dunking him in the horse trough outside the inn.

In Chapter LIV of Pickwick, Tony Weller discovers that his late wife, Susan's, will leaves £200 to Sam Weller and the rest, about £1,100, to himself. Having discovered the will he nearly burns it, believing the bequest is automatically his. The roles reverse when the more astute and worldly Sam becomes a father-figure to Tony Weller as he guides him through the probate process. On receiving his inheritance, the child-like Tony Weller asks Mr Pickwick to invest it for him, forcing his pocketbook or wallet containing the large sum of cash on the reluctant Pickwick to be looked after on his behalf. Sam Weller says to Pickwick:

"This here money," said Sam, with a little hesitation, "he’s anxious to put someveres, vere he knows it’ll be safe, and I’m wery anxious too, for if he keeps it, he’ll go a-lendin’ it to somebody, or inwestin’ property in horses, or droppin’ his pocket-book down an airy, or makin’ a Egyptian mummy of his-self in some vay or another."

"Wery good, Samivel," observed Mr. Weller, in as complacent a manner as if Sam had been passing the highest eulogiums on his prudence and foresight. "Wery good."

"For vich reasons," continued Sam, plucking nervously at the brim of his hat —"or vich reasons, he’s drawn it out to-day, and come here vith me to say, leastvays to offer, or in other vords —"

"To say this here," said the elder Mr. Weller impatiently, "that it ain’t o’ no use to me. I’m a-goin’ to vork a coach reg’lar, and ha’n’t got noveres to keep it in, unless I vos to pay the guard for takin’ care on it, or to put it in vun o’ the coach pockets, vich ‘ud be a temptation to the insides. If you’ll take care on it for me, sir, I shall be wery much obliged to you. P’raps," said Mr. Weller, walking up to Mr. Pickwick and whispering in his ear — "p’raps it’ll go a little vay towards the expenses o’ that ‘ere conwiction. All I say is, just you keep it till I ask you for it again." With these words, Mr. Weller placed the pocket-book in Mr. Pickwick’s hands, caught up his hat, and ran out of the room with a celerity scarcely to be expected from so corpulent a subject.

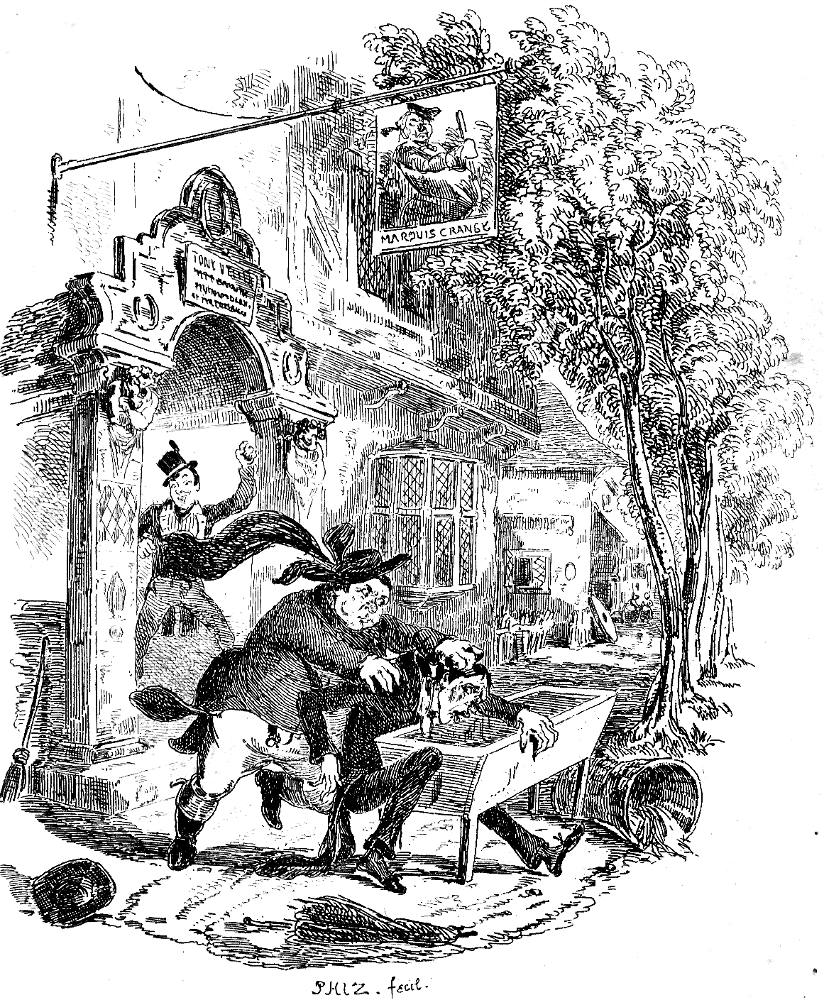
Tony Weller ejects Mr. Stiggins - illustration by Hablot Knight Browne (November 1837)

Here, Tony Weller's innocence and goodwill are revealed. He had never felt comfortable with married life, yearning instead for coaching, his friends and the open road. Widows and the law have no place in his world, and he feels threatened by them - and sees what both did to Mr. Pickwick. Nor does he know what to do with so large a sum of money, which is an impediment to the carefree and irresponsible life to which he wishes to return. After his second unsuccessful attempt at marriage, Tony Weller clearly misses his friends and life as a coachman, and intends to return to that occupation. He trusts his inheritance into the safe keeping of Mr Pickwick, knowing that as a former successful businessman Pickwick will be able to invest it safely and wisely for him. Later, Tony Weller retires because of gout and is able to live comfortably on the income from the money Mr. Pickwick invested for him.

Pickwick, Sam Weller and his father Tony Weller briefly reappeared in 1840, in the magazine Master Humphrey's Clock. Master Humphrey's Clock is the name of a literary club founded by Mr Humphrey, whose members read out stories to the others. Pickwick is a member, and there is a mirror club in the kitchen, Mr. Weller's Watch, run by Sam Weller.

== Notable portrayals ==
- Samuel Weller, or, The Pickwickians (1837) - Mr H. Hall
- The Pickwick Papers (1952) - George Robey
- Pickwick (1963) - Robin Wentworth/Norman Rossington
- The Pickwick Papers (1985) - Howard Lang
