= Monflier Point =

Monflier Point (65°55′S 66°4′W) is a point which marks the southwest end of Rabot Island in the Biscoe Islands of Antarctica. It was first charted and named by the Fourth French Antarctic Expedition, 1908–10, under Jean-Baptiste Charcot., who named it after Georges Monflier, the Secretary-General of the Normandy Geographical Society (Société normande de géographie).
