= Dodman Island =

Island of Antarctica

Coordinates: 65°58′S 65°46′W

Location of Dodman Island

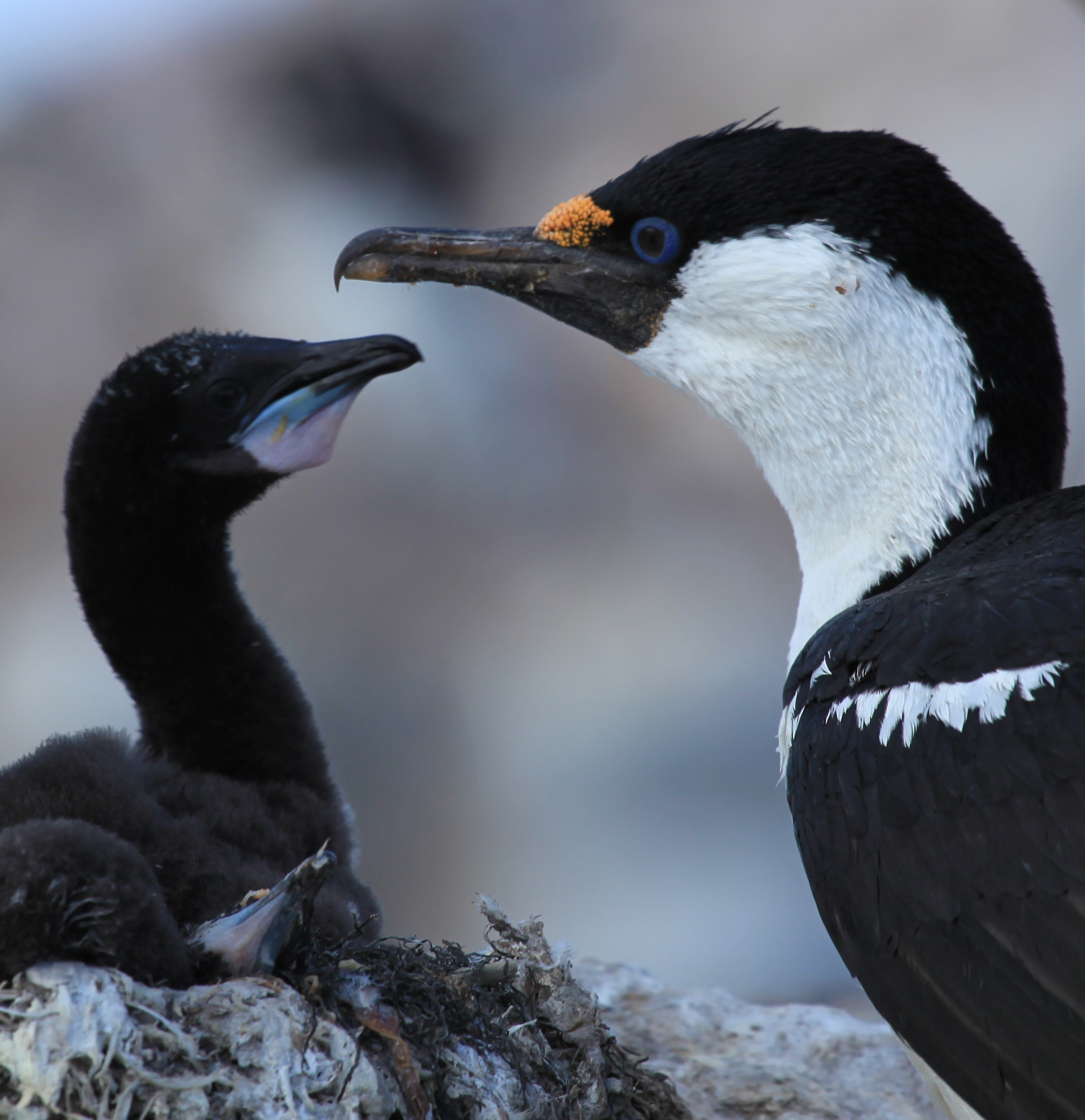
Antarctic shags breed in the IBA

Dodman Island is an island in the Biscoe Islands, 6.5 km (4.0 mi) long, lying 7.4 km (4.6 mi) south-east of Rabot Island and 18.5 km (11.5 mi) west of Ferin Head, off the west coast of Graham Land, Antarctica. The island was charted and named by the British Graham Land Expedition, 1934–37, under John Rymill.

== Important Bird Area ==
A small (12 ha) island lying about 2.5 km to the north of Dodman has been identified as an Important Bird Area (IBA) by BirdLife International because it supports a breeding colony of Antarctic shags, with 163 pairs recorded there in 1984.

== See also ==
- List of Antarctic and subantarctic islands
