= Johannessen Harbour =

Harbour in Antarctica

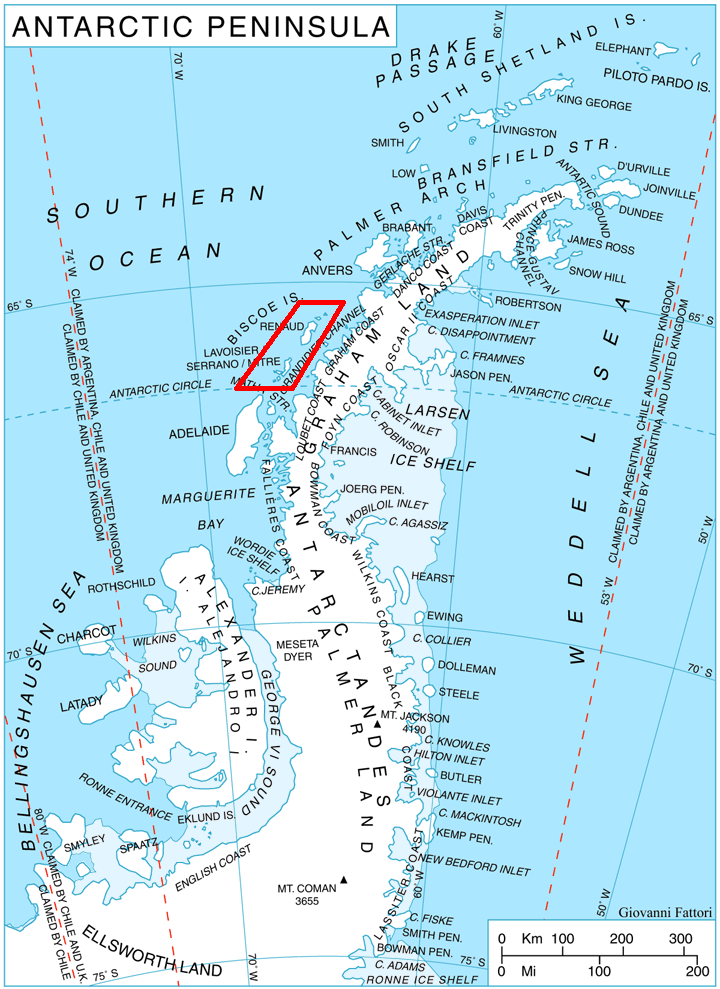
Location of Biscoe Islands in the Antarctic Peninsula region.

Johannessen Harbour (65°26′S 65°25′W) is a sheltered anchorage lying to the east and northeast of Snodgrass Island in the Pitt Islands, in the northern Biscoe Islands, Antarctica. The harbour was entered by the ship Norsel in 1955 and was then surveyed by the Falkland Islands Dependencies Survey. It was named by the UK Antarctic Place-Names Committee for Olav Johannessen, the master of Norsel.

== See also ==
- Wardle Entrance
