= Hennessy Islands =

Group of islands in the Biscoe Islands of Antarctica

The Hennessy Islands (65°53′S 65°43′W) are a group of small islands 2 nautical miles (4 km) in extent, lying 4 nautical miles (7 km) southeast of Jurva Point, the southeast end of Renaud Island, in the Biscoe Islands of Antarctica. The main islands in the group were first accurately shown on an Argentine government chart of 1957. The group was named by the UK Antarctic Place-Names Committee in 1959 for Jack Hennessy (1885–1954), Deputy Marine Superintendent of the (British) Meteorological Office, 1940–54, who collected and published reports on sea ice observations in Antarctic waters, 1902–53.

== See also ==
- List of Antarctic and sub-Antarctic islands
