= Mrs Bardell =

Mrs Bardell may refer to:

- Mrs Bardell (Pickwick Papers), a fictional landlady featured in The Pickwick Papers by Charles Dickens in 1836–37
- Mrs Bardell, a fictional landlady of Sexton Blake, created by William Murray Graydon in 1905
