= Alino Island =

Island in Antarctica

- Location of Renaud Island in Biscoe Islands

- Location within Antarctic Peninsula Location within Antarctica

Geography
- Location: Antarctica
- Coordinates: 65°32′32″S 65°37′28″W
- Archipelago: Biscoe Islands

Administration
- Administered under the Antarctic Treaty System

Demographics
- Population: Uninhabited

Alino Island (Bulgarian: остров Алино, romanized: ostrov Alino, IPA: [ˈɔstrof ˈalino]) is the predominantly ice-covered island in Biscoe Islands, Antarctica lying 1 kilometre (0.62 mi) south-southeast of Tula Point, Renaud Island. The feature is 1.2 kilometres (0.75 mi) long in southwest-northeast direction and 580 metres (0.36 mi) wide.

The island is named after the settlement of Alino in Western Bulgaria.

== Location ==
Alino Island is located at 65°32′32″S 65°37′28″W. British mapping in 1971.

== Maps ==
- British Antarctic Territory: Graham Coast. Scale 1:200000 topographic map. DOS 610 Series, Sheet W 65 64. Directorate of Overseas Surveys, UK, 1971.
- Antarctic Digital Database (ADD). Scale 1:250000 topographic map of Antarctica. Scientific Committee on Antarctic Research (SCAR). Since 1993, regularly upgraded and updated.
