= Armstrong Reef =

Reef

Coordinates: 65°54′S 66°18′W

Armstrong Reef is a reef that encompasses many ice-free plutonic islets and rocks, extending for 9 km (6 mi) from the south-west end of Renaud Island, in the Biscoe Islands of Antarctica. It was first accurately shown on an Argentine government chart of 1957, and was named by the UK Antarctic Place-Names Committee for Terence Armstrong, a British sea ice specialist.

== Important Bird Area ==
The reef has been identified as a 557 ha Important Bird Area by BirdLife International because it supports a breeding colony of over 500 pairs of Antarctic shags.
