= Mraka Sound =

Body of water in Antarctica

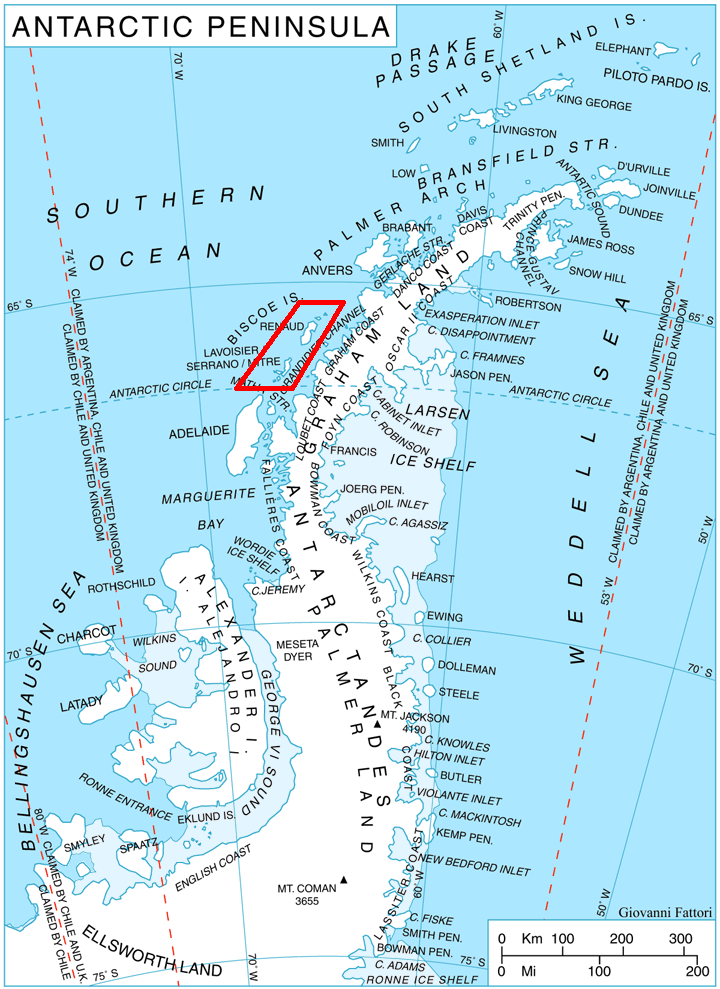
Location of Biscoe Islands in the Antarctic Peninsula region.

Mraka Sound (Bulgarian: залив Мрака, ‘Zaliv Mraka’ \'za-liv 'mra-ka\) is a roughly rectangular water body extending 5 km in southeast-northwest direction and 4.2 km in southwest-northeast direction in Biscoe Islands, Antarctica. It is bounded by Renaud Island on the south, Pickwick Island on the north and Winkle Island on the northeast.

The sound is named after the historical region of Mraka in Western Bulgaria.

== Location ==
Mraka Sound is centred at 65°31′40″S 65°42′00″W. British mapping in 1971.

== Maps ==
- British Antarctic Territory: Graham Coast. Scale 1:200000 topographic map. DOS 610 Series, Sheet W 65 64. Directorate of Overseas Surveys, UK, 1971.
- Antarctic Digital Database (ADD). Scale 1:250000 topographic map of Antarctica. Scientific Committee on Antarctic Research (SCAR). Since 1993, regularly upgraded and updated.
