= Mrs Bardell (Pickwick Papers) =

Fictional character in The Pickwick Papers

- The Pickwick Papers character
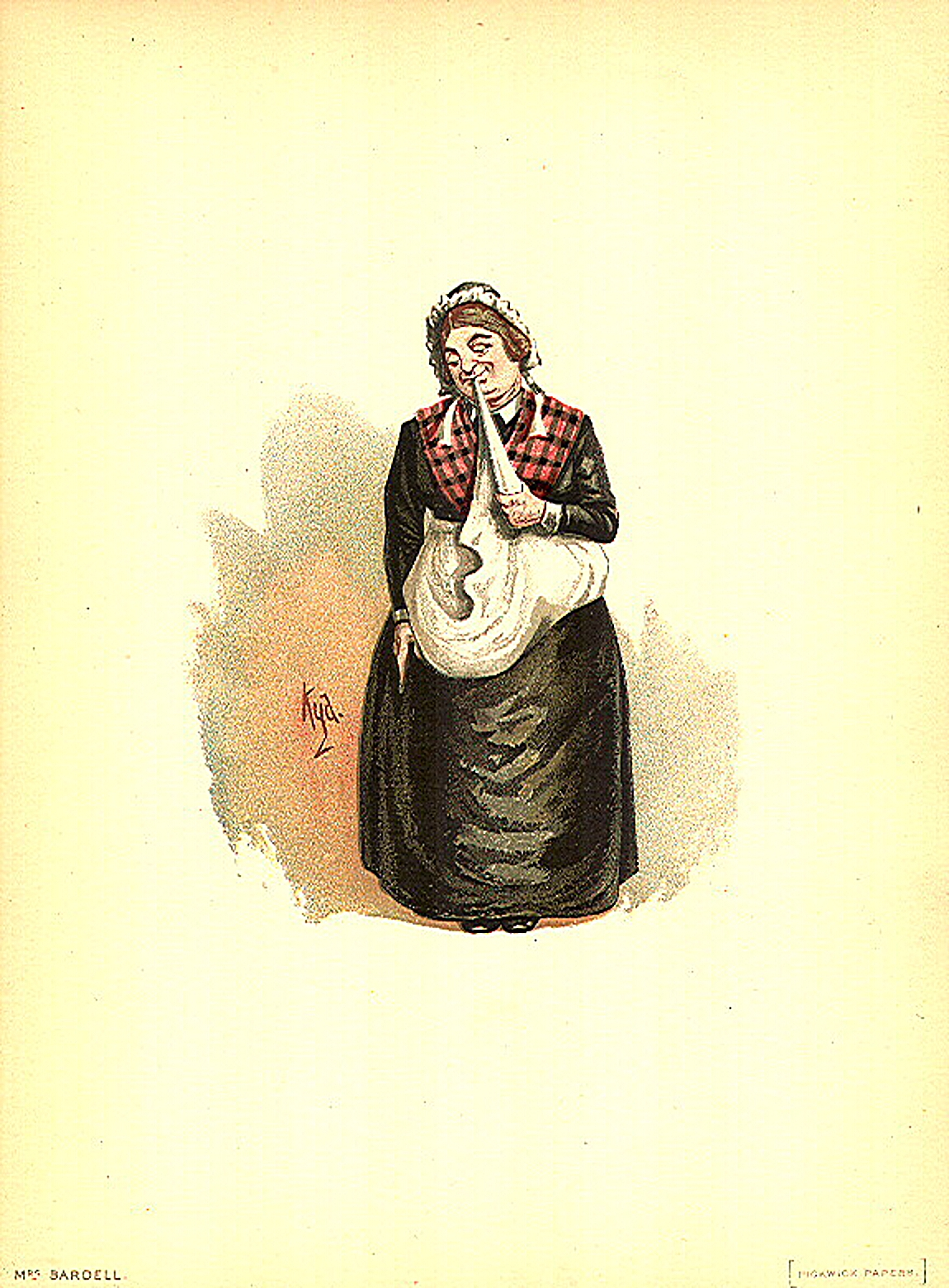
- Mrs Bardell as illustrated by "Kyd" (c1890)
- Created by: Charles Dickens
- Portrayed by: Jessie Bond

In-universe information
- Full name: Martha Bardell
- Gender: Female
- Occupation: Landlady
- Nationality: English

Mrs Martha Bardell is a fictional character in The Pickwick Papers (1836–1837), the first novel by Charles Dickens. A widow and the landlady of Mr Pickwick, a romantic misunderstanding between the two results in one of the most famous fictional legal cases in English literature, Bardell v. Pickwick, leading to them both being incarcerated in the Fleet Prison for debt.

== Background ==
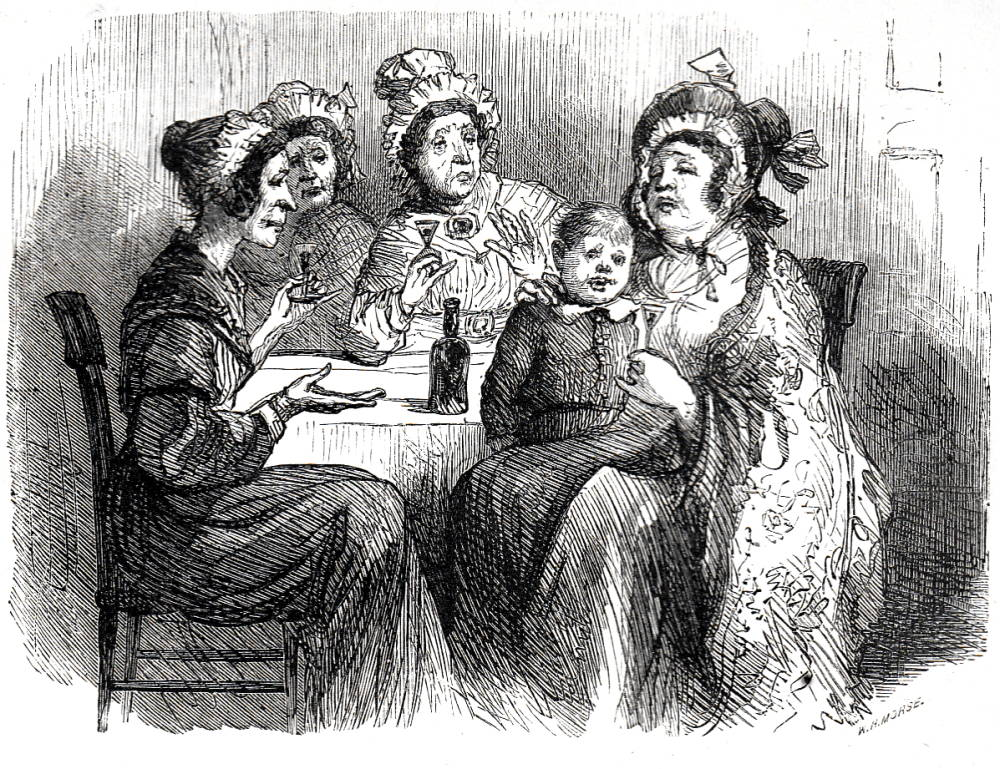
Mrs Bardell and Friends – illustration by Sol Eytinge Jr. (1867)

Mrs Martha Bardell is a widow, "the relict and sole executrix of a deceased custom–house officer ... a comely woman of bustling manners and agreeable appearance, with a natural genius for cooking, improved by study and long practice, into an exquisite talent." With her young son she lives on Goswell Street in London where she provides lodgings for two lodgers including retired businessman Mr Pickwick, the latter taking two rooms at the front of the house. Mrs Bardell develops an affection for Pickwick and regards him as a potential marriage partner. Having no servant, the hardworking landlady Mrs. Bardell looked after the needs of her young son Tommy Bardell and those of her two lodgers single-handed. Her Counsel, Mr. Serjeant Buzfuz, later described the services she provided for Pickwick: "She waited on him, attended to his comforts, cooked his meals, looked out his linen for the washer-woman when it went abroad, darned, aired, and prepared it for his wear when it came home, and, in short, enjoyed his fullest trust and confidence."

== Bardell v. Pickwick ==
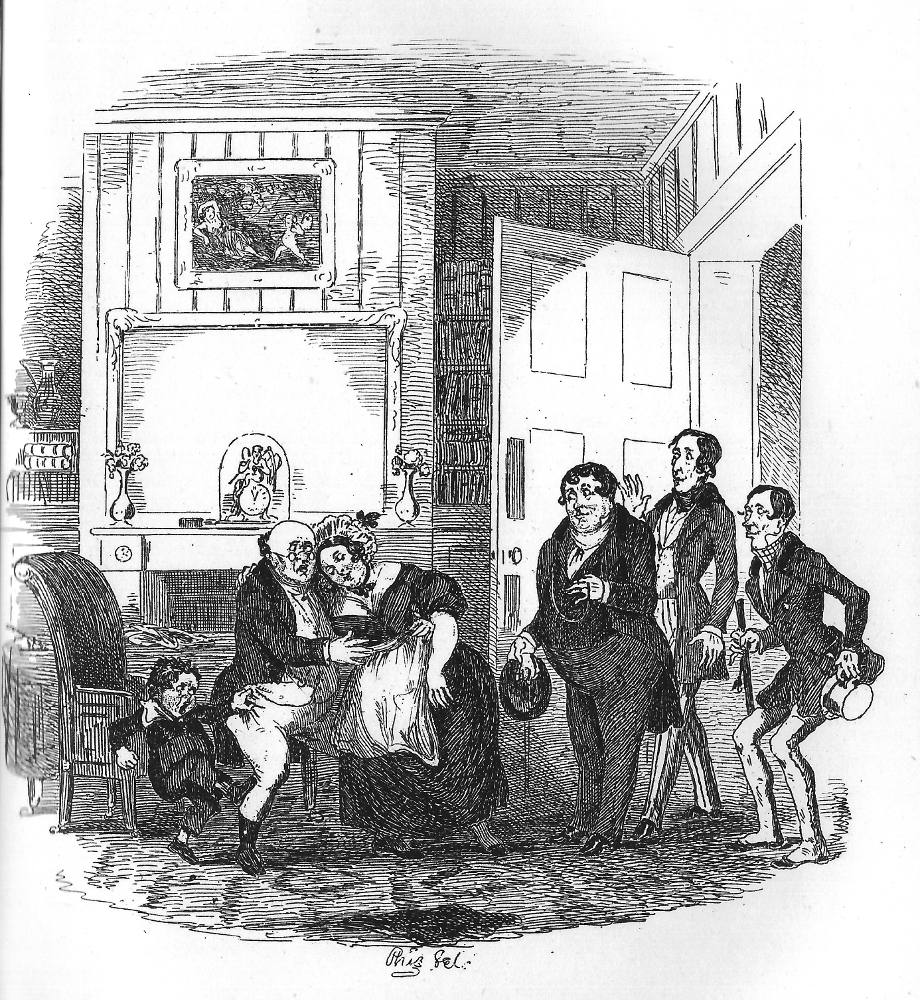
Mrs. Bardell faints in Mr. Pickwick's arms – illustration by Hablot Knight Browne (1837)

When Pickwick discusses with Mrs Bardell his idea of taking a servant (Sam Weller), expressing the view that three may eat as cheaply as two, she mistakes this for a marriage proposal and accepting his 'offer', much to his dismay, faints into his arms, possibly deliberately, as his three friends Winkle, Snodgrass and Tupman walk through the door and witness the scene.

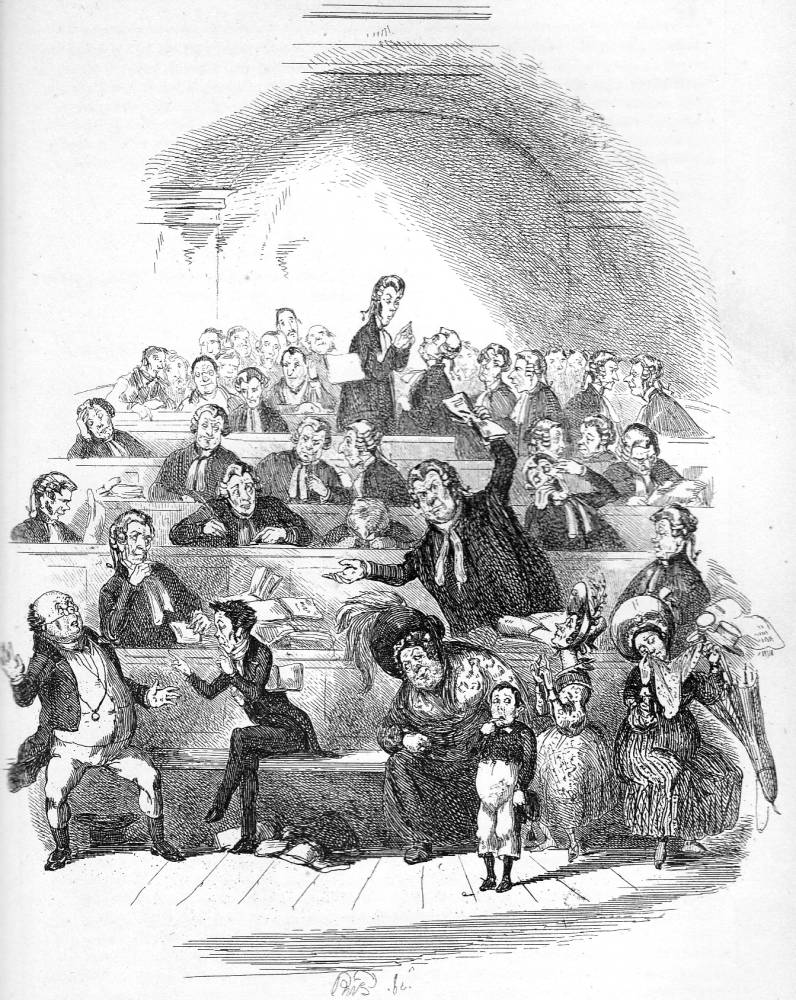
The Trial of Bardell v. Pickwick – illustration by Hablot Knight Browne (1867)

When Pickwick refuses to marry her Mrs Bardell is persuaded by the unscrupulous lawyers Dodson and Fogg into bringing a breach of promise to marry suit against Pickwick in Bardell v. Pickwick, one of the most famous fictional legal cases in English literature. During the trial at the Guildhall Sittings in London before Mr. Justice Stareleigh, Mr. Serjeant Buzfuz prosecutes Pickwick and bullies the witnesses into giving incriminating testimony, leading to Pickwick being falsely convicted; he is imprisoned in the Fleet Prison for refusing to pay the fines awarded against him. Eventually Mrs. Bardell too is sent to the same prison by her attorneys for not paying their fees. Pickwick learns that the only way he can relieve her suffering is by paying her costs in the action against himself, thus at the same time releasing himself from the prison.

== Legacy ==
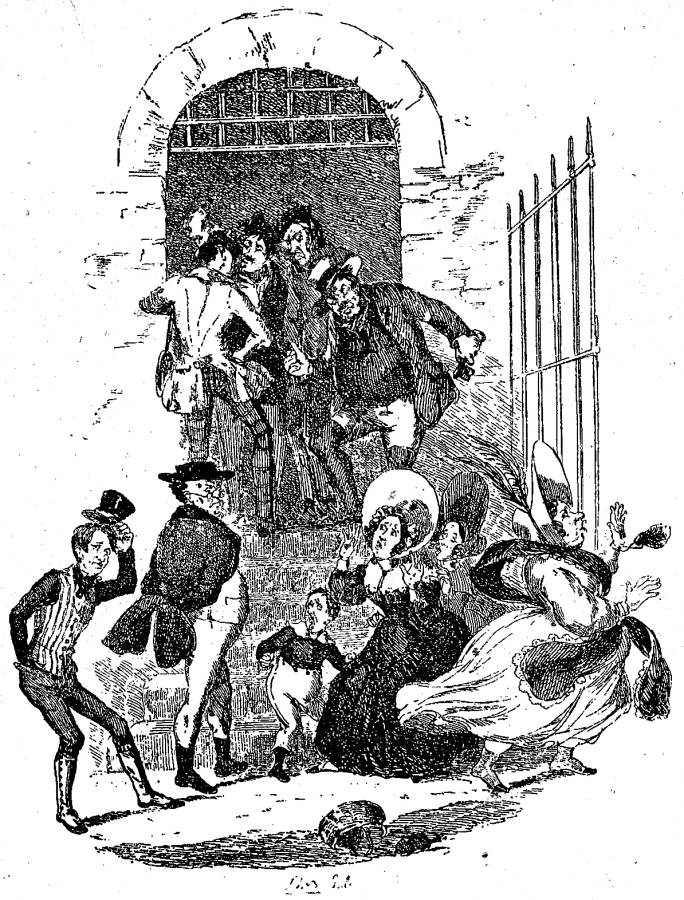
Mrs. Bardell encounters Mr. Pickwick in the Fleet Prison – illustration by Hablot Knight Browne (August 1837)

Bardell Rock, south of Dickens Rocks in the Pitt Islands, northern Biscoe Islands, was named by the UK Antarctic Place-Names Committee in 1971 after Mrs Bardell.

== Notable portrayals ==
- Mrs Melville – Samuel Weller, or, The Pickwickians (1837)
- Lottie Venne – in the operetta Pickwick (1889)
- Jessie Bond – in a revival of the operetta Pickwick (1893–94)
- Laura Joyce Bell – Mr. Pickwick (1903) at the Herald Square Theatre and later the Grand Opera House.
- Mary Brough – The Adventures of Mr. Pickwick (1921)
- Hermione Baddeley – The Pickwick Papers (1952)
- Edna Morris – Bardell V. Pickwick (1955)
- Jessie Evans – in the West End musical Pickwick (1963)
- Charlotte Rae – in the Broadway musical Pickwick (1965)
- Hattie Jacques – Pickwick (1969)
- Jo Kendall – The Pickwick Papers (1985)
