= Belogushev Island =

Antarctic island

- Location within Antarctica Location within Antarctic Peninsula

Geography
- Location: Antarctica
- Coordinates: 65°46′02″S 66°08′58″W
- Archipelago: Biscoe Islands
- Area: 68 ha (170 acres)
- Length: 1.3 km (0.81 mi)
- Width: 850 m (2790 ft)

Administration
- Administered under the Antarctic Treaty System

Demographics
- Population: uninhabited

Belogushev Island (Bulgarian: Белогушев остров, romanized: Belogushev ostrov, IPA: [bɛɫoˈguʃɛf ˈɔstrof]) is the mostly ice-covered island off the west coast of Renaud Island in Biscoe Islands, Antarctica extending 1.3 km in southeast-northwest direction and 850 m in southwest-northeast direction, and ending in Speerschneider Point on the northwest. Its surface area is 68 ha. The island was formed at the end of the first decade of 21st century as a result of the retreat of the ice cap of Renaud Island.

The feature is named after the Bulgarian geologist Vasil Belogushev for his support for the Bulgarian Antarctic programme.

== Location ==
Belogushev Island is centred at 65°46′02″S 66°08′58″W, which is 11.5 km north of Lively Point and 11.5 km south-southwest of Maurstad Point. British mapping in 1960.

== Maps ==
- Falkland Islands Dependencies (provisional issue for positioning of place names). Sheet 65 66. Scale 1:200000. Research Department, Foreign Office, 1960
- Antarctic Digital Database (ADD). Scale 1:250000 topographic map of Antarctica. Scientific Committee on Antarctic Research (SCAR). Since 1993, regularly upgraded and updated

== See also ==
- List of Antarctic and subantarctic islands
