= Rodman Passage =

Sea passage in the Biscoe Islands, Antarctica

Rodman Passage (65°52′S 66°0′W) is a passage between the south end of Renaud Island and Rabot Island, in the Biscoe Islands. Charted by the French Antarctic Expedition under Charcot, 1908–10. Named by the United Kingdom Antarctic Place-Names Committee (UK-APC) in 1959 for Hugh Rodman of the United States Hydrographic Office, author in 1890 of Reports of Ice and Ice Movements in the North Atlantic, a pioneer work on the subject.
