= Southwind Passage =

Southwind Passage (65°18′S 65°20′W) is a navigable passage between Betbeder Islands and Dickens Rocks, located at the north extremity of the Biscoe Islands. Named by Captain Sumner R. Dolber, USCG, commander of the USCGC 1967–68 season.
