= Tupman Island =

Antarctic island

Location of Tupman Island

Tupman Island (65°29′S 65°32′W) is an island 2 nautical miles (3.7 km) long lying east of Pickwick Island, Pitt Islands, in the Biscoe Islands. Shown on an Argentine government chart of 1957. Named by the United Kingdom Antarctic Place-Names Committee (UK-APC) in 1959 after Tracy Tupman, a member of the Pickwick Club in Charles Dickens' Pickwick Papers.

== See also ==
- List of Antarctic and sub-Antarctic islands
