= Sawyer Island =

Island in the Biscoe Islands

Coordinates: 65°26′S 65°32′W

Location of Sawyer Island

Sawyer Island is an island 2 nautical miles (3.7 km; 2.3 mi) long lying north of Pickwick Island, Pitt Islands, in the Biscoe Islands. Shown on an Argentine government chart of 1957. Named by the United Kingdom Antarctic Place-Names Committee (UK-APC) in 1959 after Robert Sawyer, one of the central characters in Charles Dickens' Pickwick Papers.

== See also ==
- List of Antarctic and sub-Antarctic islands
