= Lacuna Island =

Island in Antarctica

- Location of Lacuna Island

- Location within Antarctic Peninsula Location within Antarctica

Geography
- Location: Antarctica
- Coordinates: 65°31′S 65°18′W

Administration
- Administered under the Antarctic Treaty System

Demographics
- Population: Uninhabited

Lacuna Island is a small island lying 15 km (8 nmi) east of Tula Point, the northern end of Renaud Island, in the Pitt Islands, Antarctica. It was mapped from air photos obtained by Hunting Aerosurveys Ltd, 1956–57, and was so named by the UK Antarctic Place-Names Committee because the island lies in a lacuna (a gap) in the vertical air photos.

== See also ==
- List of Antarctic and sub-Antarctic islands
