= Bates Island =

Island of Antarctica

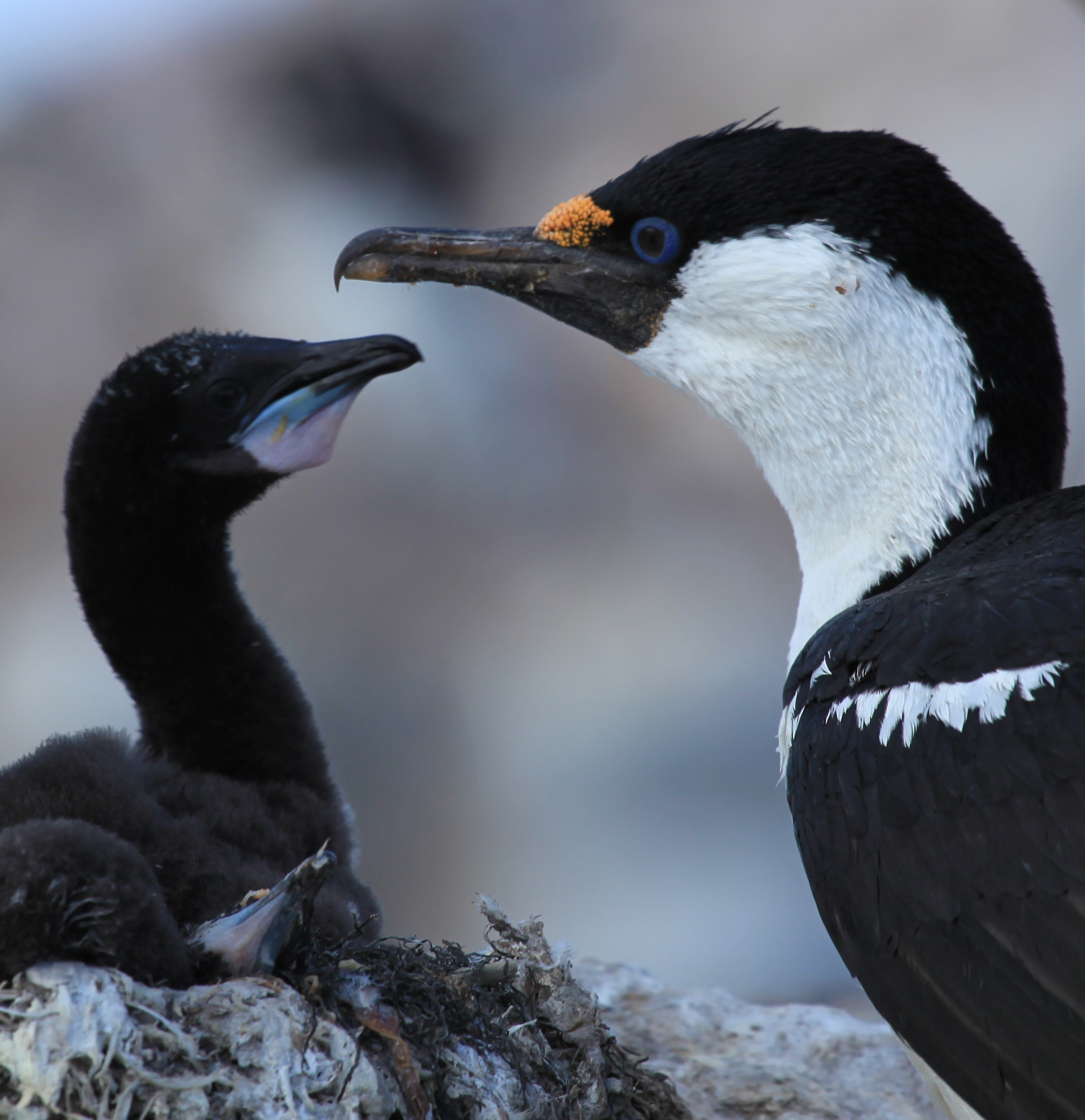
- Antarctic shags breed in the IBA

- Location in Antarctica Bates Island (Antarctica)

Geography
- Location: Antarctica
- Coordinates: 65°49′S 65°38′W

Administration
- Administered under the Antarctic Treaty System

Demographics
- Population: Uninhabited

Bates Island is a narrow island 5 km (3.1 mi) long lying east of Jurva Point, Renaud Island, in the Biscoe Islands of Antarctica. It was first accurately shown on an Argentine government chart of 1957, and was named by the UK Antarctic Place-Names Committee in 1959 for Charles C. Bates, an American oceanographer who has specialised in sea ice studies.

== Important Bird Area ==
A circular 500 ha tract of land and sea, centred on an islet lying about 700 m to the south of Bates, has been identified as an Important Bird Area (IBA) by BirdLife International because it supports a breeding colony of Antarctic shags, with about 150 pairs recorded there in 1986.

== See also ==
- List of Antarctic and subantarctic islands
