= Adolph Islands =

Group of islands in Antarctica

- Location within Antarctica

Geography
- Location: Antarctica
- Coordinates: 66°19′S 67°11′W
- Archipelago: Biscoe Islands

Administration
- Administered under the Antarctic Treaty System

The Adolph Islands are a group of small islands and rocks off northwest Watkins Island, in the Biscoe Islands. Mapped from air photos by Falkland Islands and Dependencies Aerial Survey Expedition (FIDASE) (1956–1957). Named by United Kingdom Antarctic Place-Names Committee (UK-APC) for the American Edward F. Adolph, Professor of Physiology, University of Rochester, 1948–1960, who specialized in the reactions of the human body to cold.

== See also ==
- List of Antarctic and sub-Antarctic islands
