= William John Hammond =

British actor of the 19th-century

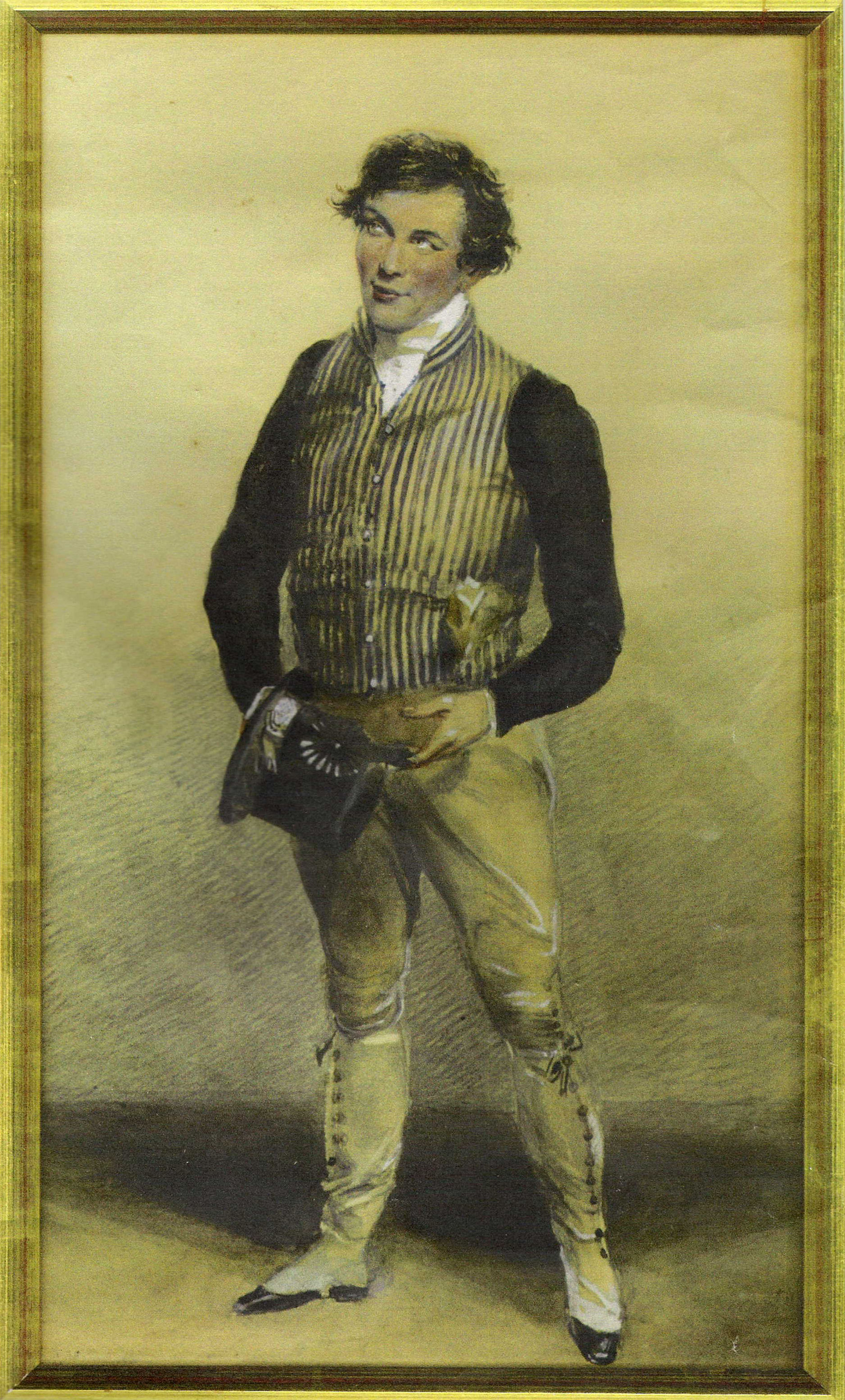
W. J. Hammond as Sam Weller in Samuel Weller, or, The Pickwickians (1837) - displayed in the Charles Dickens Museum

William John Hammond (1 July 1797–23 August 1848) was a British actor-manager and singer of comic songs of the early 19th century. He played Sam Weller in Samuel Weller, or, The Pickwickians in 1837.

== Early life ==
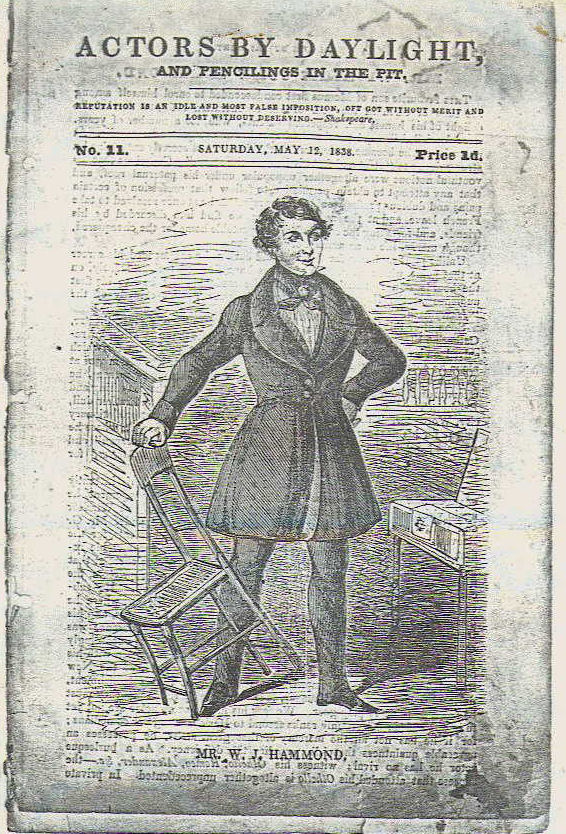
Hammond on the cover of Actors by Daylight (1838)

W. J. Hammond was born in 1797 in Soho in London, the son of Anna Maria Lockhead (1767–1812) and Edward Hammond. As a youth he was apprenticed to a letter painter and decorator, but to the annoyance of his parents he turned his back on this career in favour of one on the stage, and left home at 19 to pursue it. A low comedian and singer, his first appearance on the London stage was as Lopez in John Tobin's The Honey Moon, probably in early 1819. In July 1819 he joined a new stock company at Walton-on-Thames, while in September 1820 he was with Thomas Trotter's company at the Theatre Royal in Worthing before joining the acting company of John Brunton at Brighton. Between 1820 and 1821 he variously appeared at the Haymarket Theatre and with Penley's company while it was playing at Worthing, Windsor and Coventry. He joined the company of William Macready the Elder, the father of the tragedian William Macready, at the Theatre Royal in Bristol before a short period at the Olympic Theatre in London. Between 1823 and 1826 he toured the York circuit and during this early period in his career he gained success as Bob Acres in The Rivals and as Tony Lumpkin in She Stoops to Conquer.

On 13 August 1822 in London he married Jane Matilda Jerrold (1801–1866), the sister of the dramatist and writer Douglas William Jerrold. She would later act as Mrs W. J. Hammond. Their children were: Mary Ann Hammond (born 1825); William John Hammond (1827–1903); Jane Matilda Hammond (1829–1842); Henry Holbrey Hammond (1833–1908); Fanny Elizabeth Hammond (1834–1878); Emily H Hammond (born 1836); Kate Hammond (1840–1902) and Susanna Hammond (born 1842). In May 1827 at the York Theatre Royal he played Jack Junk, a British sailor, in Floating Beacon, or, Norwegian Wreckers while on the same bill his wife played Second Lady in the tragedy Foscari.

== Acting career ==
From 1826 to 1829 Hammond and his wife appeared at the Theatre Royal in Liverpool, while in 1829 he was one of a partnership running the Liverpool Pantheon, which he reopened as the Liver Theatre, remaining there until 1836. In April 1830 he took over the management of the York circuit which included the Theatre Royal, Hull and the Theatre Royal, York in addition to other theatres at Doncaster, Leeds and Wakefield. Although he was only manager of the circuit for a short period he attracted well-known actors of the day to the theatres, including Edmund Kean, Charles Mathews, Frederick Henry Yates and Madame Vestris. He gave up all but the theatre at Doncaster in 1832 when he could not negotiate a reduction in his rents at the other theatres. In Liverpool in 1834 he played the title role in Dowling's Othello by Act of Parliament, a musical burlesque version of Othello. At Doncaster he put on an annual autumn season until 1839, and took out a lease on the theatre at Sheffield from 1833 to 1839. He returned to Liverpool where he became well known to theatre audiences as an actor, comedian and theatre owner where he played in comedies and burlesque.

== Royal Strand Theatre ==
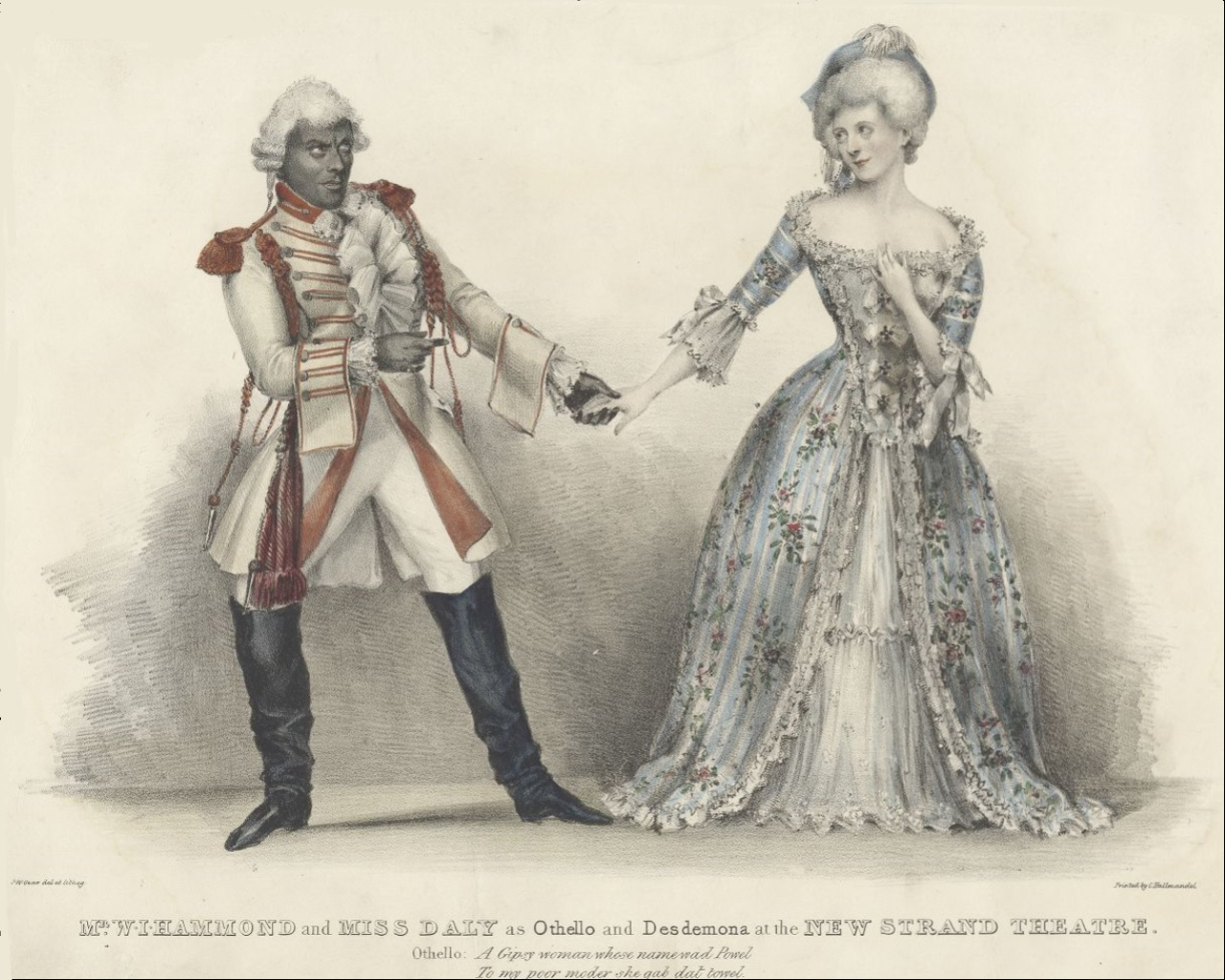
Hammond as Othello and Miss Daly as Desdemona in the burlesque Othello by Act of Parliament at the Royal Strand Theatre

From 25 April 1836 for three years he and his brother-in-law Douglas Jerrold held the lease on the small Royal Strand Theatre in London, enlarging the theatre in 1836 and adding a gallery in 1839. An early production was Jerrold's two-act comedy The Schoolfellows. Their production of Poachers and Petticoats featured the actress Louisa Cranstoun Nisbett. A Freemason, he was initiated into the Bank of England Lodge No. 263 in April 1836 at which time he gave his occupation as 'Music Dealer' and his address as the Strand Theatre.

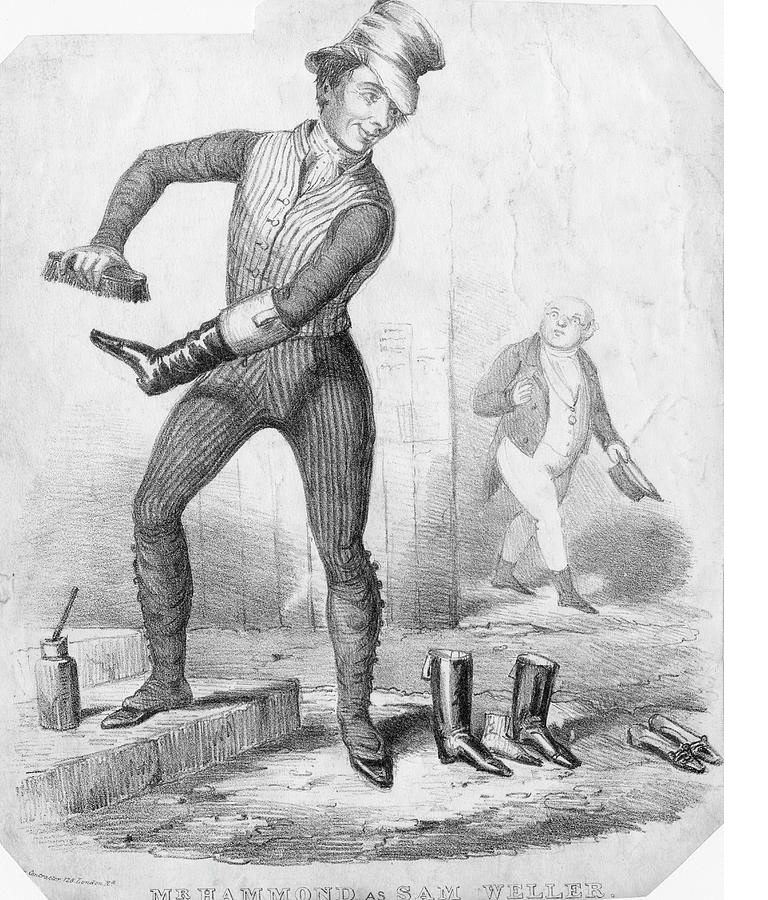
Hammond as Sam Weller in Samuel Weller, or, The Pickwickians (1837)

At the Strand Theatre he reprised his role in Othello by Act of Parliament and acted in a burlesques version of The Lady of Lyons. In 1837 as actor-manager he directed and played the lead role in Samuel Weller, or, The Pickwickians. Their management of the theatre was not successful, and the partnership was dissolved. However, while it lasted Jerrold wrote his only tragedy, The Painter of Ghent, and himself appeared in the title role, without much success. The contemporary theatre journal Actors by Daylight (1838) referred to him as 'this favourite son of Momus’ and commented on his ‘agreeable quaintness’. A friend was the author Charles Dickens.

== Bankruptcy and prison ==
From October 1839 Hammond was the manager of the Theatre Royal, Drury Lane but despite the patronage of Queen Victoria the venture was a financial disaster leading to the failure of his management in March 1840 when he was declared bankrupt with debts of £8,000. He spent more than a year in debtors' prison and on his release he attempted to revive his previous success by appearing with provincial companies. The actor John Coleman (1831–1904) later recollected of Hammond that, 'He had wigs of all kinds and costumes of every description, but he was always Hammond in another wig and another coat.'

== Later years ==
By December 1842 Hammond and his family had returned once again to Liverpool where he briefly held the lease for the Theatre Royal, while later that month his daughter Jane Matilda, who was attending school in Boulogne, died aged 13 and was buried there. In 1846 he opened another Liverpool theatre as the Theatre Royal Adelphi, but this also proving unsuccessful in June 1848 he sailed for an acting engagement in the United States. In July 1848 he made his New York début at Niblo's Garden Theatre at Astor Place where he sang from his repertoire of comic songs. In early August 1848 he appeared in various productions at Niblo's including playing Tony Lumpkin in She Stoops to Conquer. On the second night of his appearance in the title role in Paul Pry parts of his role were omitted owing to his fatigue.

William John Hammond died of dysentery at the residence of a Mrs Black on Broadway in New York on 23 August 1848 only five weeks after arriving in America. His personal belongings were auctioned including the scarlet frock coat he wore as Tony Lumpkin in his début at Niblo's Theatre, various other costumes, a number of wigs and the orchestral scores which singers provided for theatre orchestras. He received an obituary in The Illustrated London News which stated:

This well known actor died recently in New York, leaving, we are sorry to say, his wife and family of seven children perfectly destitute. Mr Hammond was known through the country as one of the best low comedy actors of his day, and as a manager. In London he directed the Strand Theatre in its more palmy era and afterwards for a brief season, Drury Lane. A subscription, we understand, has been set on foot at Liverpool for the relief of his family; we trust the example may be followed in the metropolis.

Hammond's funeral service was held at St Mark's church in New York attended by various members of the acting profession and he was buried in Green-Wood Cemetery. His son Henry Holbrey Hammond became a mining engineer in Peru and on his father's death he took on the financial responsibility for his mother and younger siblings. Having experienced at first hand the financial uncertainty connected with a theatrical career, he discouraged his own children from going on the stage.
