= Matha Strait =

Strait in Antarctica

Coordinates: 66°34′S 67°30′W

Matha Strait is a strait lying between Adelaide Island and the south end of the Biscoe Islands. The strait takes its name from "Matha Bay", the name originally applied by Jean-Baptiste Charcot, leader of the French Antarctic Expedition, 1908–10, to the water feature as he conceived it. The British Graham Land Expedition under John Rymill, 1934–37, recognizing that it is really a strait rather than a bay, changed the name to Matha Strait. The name is for Lieutenant André Matha, second-in-command of the French Antarctic Expedition, 1903–05, also under Charcot.
