= Samuel Weller, or, The Pickwickians =

1837 stage comedy by Moncrieff

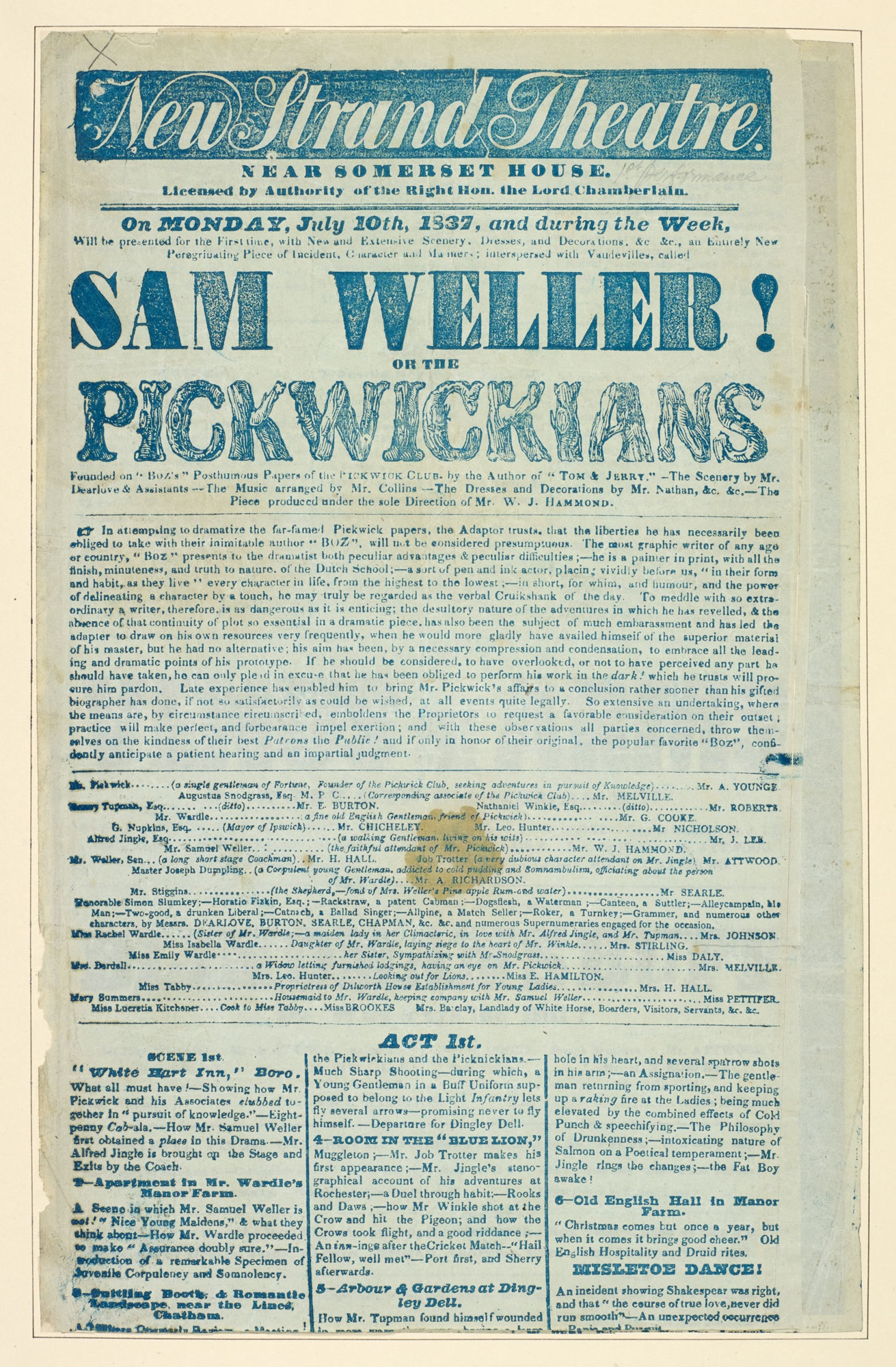
Original playbill for Samuel Weller, or, The Pickwickians (1837)

Samuel Weller, or, The Pickwickians is an 1837 comedy in three acts adapted from Dickens's novel The Pickwick Papers by William Thomas Moncrieff. It was first performed at the Royal Strand Theatre in London on 17 July 1837.

W. T. Moncrieff's 'Farcical Comedy' Sam Weller; or the Pickwickians opened at the Royal Strand Theatre in 1837 in a production directed by William John Hammond (1797–1848) and that ran for 80 performances before touring the provinces. The production was memorable for the Alfred Jingle of John Lee and the Sam Weller of Hammond. In the same year a production opened in New York and Philadelphia where it had a good run despite poor reviews.

Dickens complained against this adaptation with Moncrieff defending his plagiarism in a long advertisement on the playbill in which he stated, 'Late experience has enabled him to bring Mr. Pickwick's affairs to a conclusion rather sooner than his gifted biographer has done, if not so satisfactorily as could be wished, at all events quite legally.' While Moncrieff had apologised to ‘Boz’ in his notes on the playbill this failed to placate Dickens, who caricatured Moncrieff as the 'literary gentleman' and actor-manager Vincent Crummles in his novel Nicholas Nickleby "who had dramatized in his time two hundred and forty-seven novels, as fast as they had come out – some of them faster than they had come out". Moncrieff's response was to plagiarise Nickleby in another production in 1839.

At least four productions of Pickwick were being performed on the London stage while the novel was still being serialised, with Moncrieff's adaptation described as the most successful. As the title suggests, Moncrieff decided to focus on Sam Weller, the main comic character in the novel, rather than on Samuel Pickwick himself.

The play had a revival at the New Strand Theatre in May and July 1838 with largely the original cast.

The play was adapted in 1850 by Thomas Hailes Lacy as The Pickwickians; or the Peregrinations of Sam Weller as a comic drama in three acts in prose.

== Original cast ==
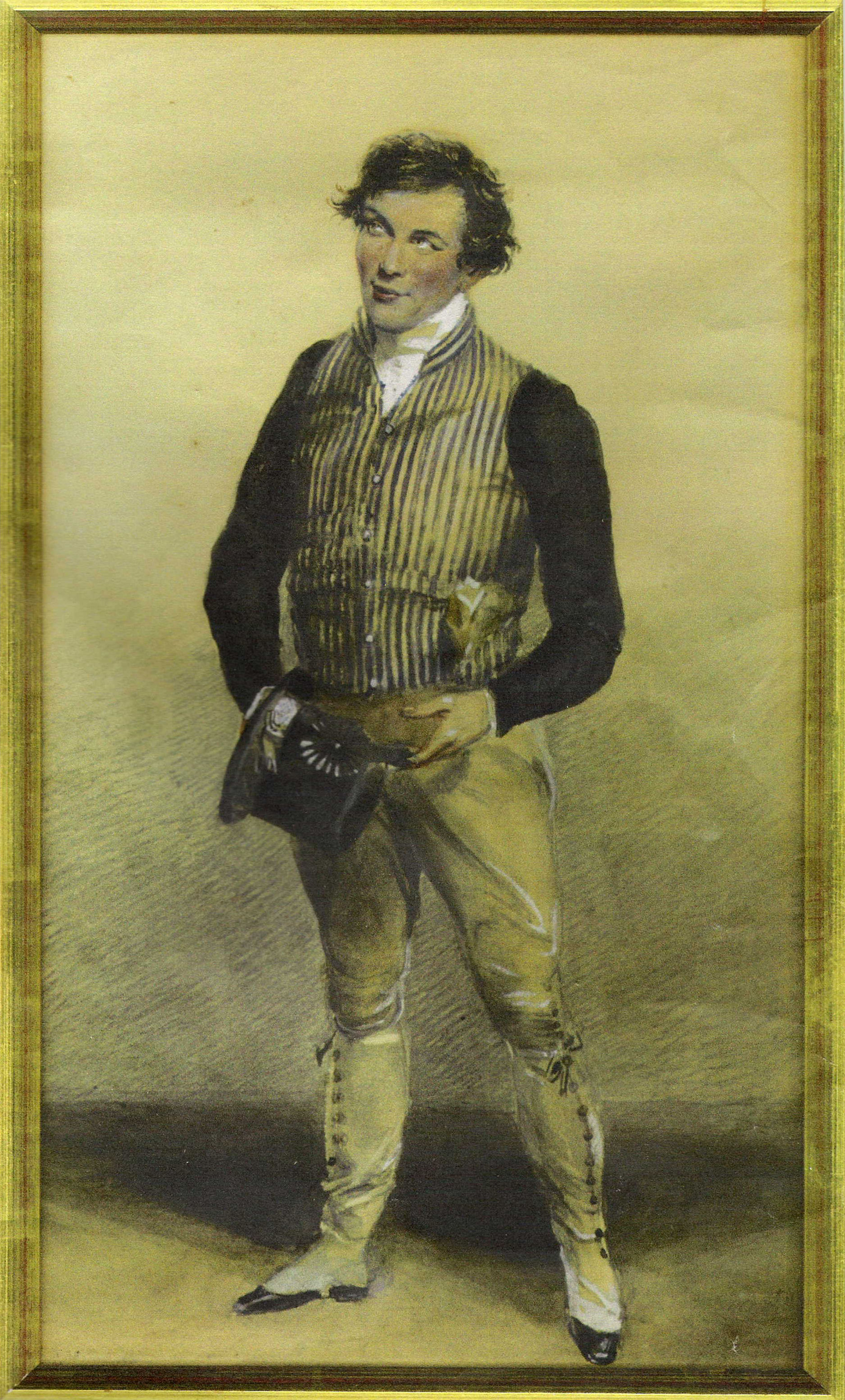
W. J. Hammond as Sam Weller in the original production (1837) - displayed in the Charles Dickens Museum

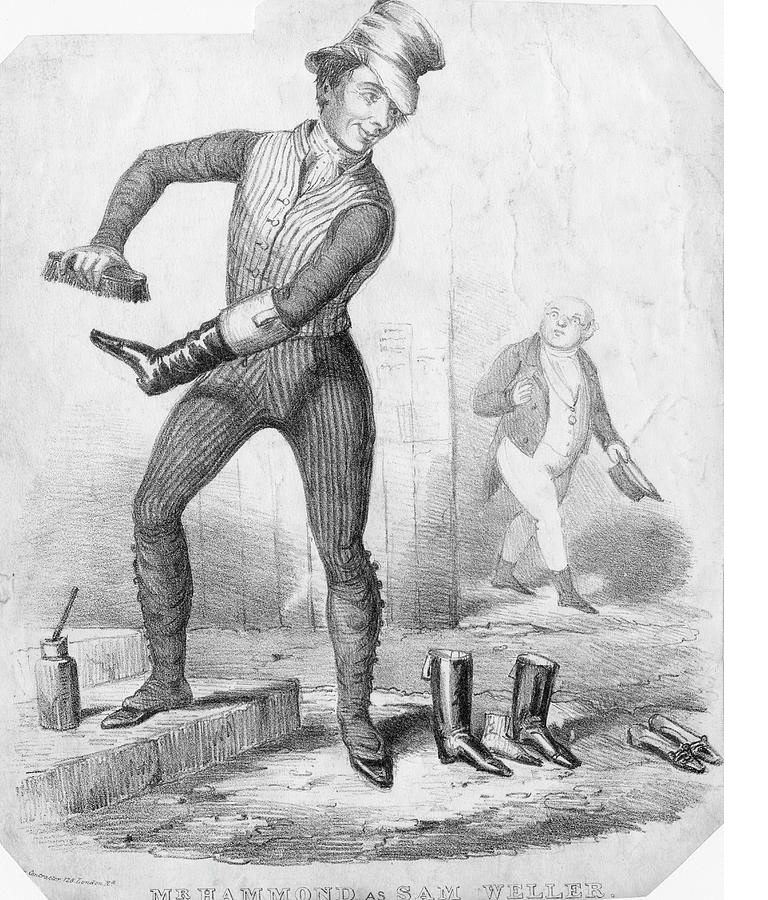
Hammond as Sam Weller with A. Younge as Pickwick in the background

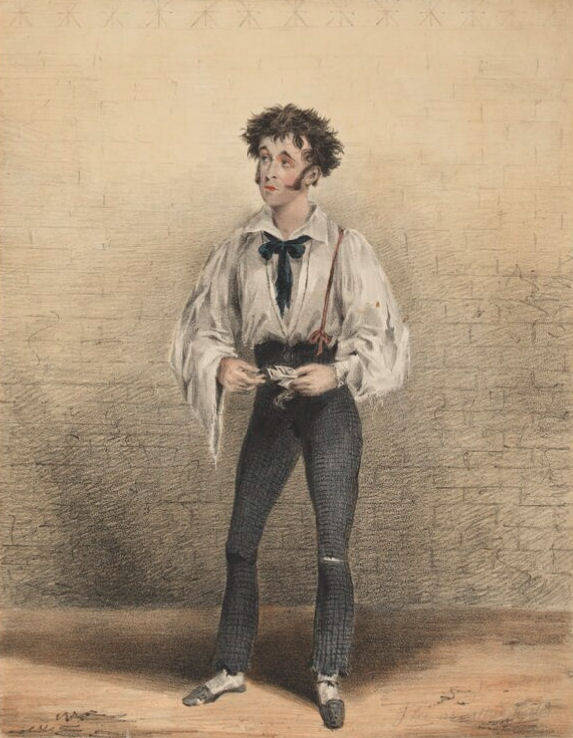
John Lee as Alfred Jingle in the Fleet Prison

- Mr Pickwick (a single gentleman of Fortune, Founder of the Pickwick Club, seeking adventures in pursuit of Knowledge) - Mr A Younge
- Augustus Snodgrass, Esq., MPC (corresponding associate of the Pickwick Club) - Mr Melville
- Tracy Tupman, Esq., (ditto) - Mr E Burton
- Nathaniel Winkle, Esq., (ditto) - Mr Roberts
- Mr Wardle (A fine old English Gentleman, friend of Pickwick) - Mr George Cooke
- Mr Nupkins, Esq., (Mayor of Ipswich) - Mr Chicheley
- Mr Leo Hunter - Mr Nicholson
- Alfred Jingle, Esq., (A walking Gentleman, living on his wits) - Mr John Lee
- Mr Samuel Weller (the faithful attendant of Mr Pickwick) - Mr W. J. Hammond
- Mr Weller, sen. (A long short stage Coachman) - Mr H Hall
- Job Trotter (A very dubious character attendant on Mr. Jingle) - Mr Attwood
- Master Joseph Dumpling (A Corpulent young Gentleman, addicted to cold pudding and Somnambulism, officiating about the person of Mr. Wardle ) - Mr A Richardson
- Mr Stiggins (the Shepherd - fond of Mrs. Weller's Pine-apple Rum-and-Water) - Mr Searle

Honorable Simon Slumkey; Horatio Fizkin, Esq.; Rackstraw, a patent Cabman; Dogsflesh, a Waterman; Canteen, a Suttler; Alleycampain, his man; Two-Good, a Drunken Liberal; Catnach, a Ballad Singer; Allpine, a Match Seller; Roker, a Turnkey; Grammer; and numerous other characters by Messrs Dearlove, Burton, Searle, Chapman, &c. &c. and numerous Supernumeraries engaged for the occasion.

- Miss Rachel Wardle - Sister of Mr Wardle - a maiden lady late in her Climacteric, in love with Mr. Alfred Jingle, and Mr. Tupman - Mrs Johnson
- Miss Isabella Wardle - Daughter of Mr Wardle, laying siege to the heart of Mr. Winkle - Miss Hammond
- Miss Emily Wardle - her Sister, Sympathising with Mr. Snodgrass - Miss Daly
- Mrs Bardell - A Widow letting furnished lodgings, having an eye on Mr. Pickwick - Mrs Melville
- Mrs Leo Hunter - Looking out for Lions - Miss E Hamilton
- Miss Tabby - Proprietress of Dilworth House Establishment for Young Ladies - Mrs H Hall
- Mary Summers - Housemaid to Mr. Wardle, keeping company with Mr. Samuel Weller - Miss Petifer
- Miss Lucretia Kitchener - Cook to Miss Tabby - Miss Brookes

Mrs Barclay, Landlady of White Horse, Boarders, Visitors, Servants, &c. &c.
