= Trundle Island =

Island in the Biscoe Islands

Location of Trundle Island

Trundle Island (65°23′S 65°18′W) is an island lying 1 nautical mile (1.9 km) northeast of Jingle Island, Pitt Islands, in the Biscoe Islands. Photographed by Hunting Aerosurveys Ltd. in 1956 and mapped from these photos by the Falkland Islands Dependencies Survey (FIDS). Named by the United Kingdom Antarctic Place-Names Committee (UK-APC) in 1959 after Mr Trundle, a character in Charles Dickens' Pickwick Papers.

== See also ==
- List of Antarctic and sub-Antarctic islands
