= Dickens Rocks =

The Dickens Rocks (65°19′S 65°23′W) are two rocks lying at the north end of the Pitt Islands, in the Biscoe Islands. They were photographed by Hunting Aerosurveys Ltd in 1956, and mapped from these photos by the Falkland Islands Dependencies Survey. They were named by the UK Antarctic Place-Names Committee in 1959 for Charles Dickens, the English novelist. A number of other features in the Pitt Islands are named after characters in his The Pickwick Papers.
