= Jingle Island =

- Location of Jingle Island in the Pitt Islands

- Location within Antarctic Peninsula Location within Antarctica

Geography
- Location: Antarctica
- Coordinates: 65°23′S 65°18′W

Administration
- Administered under the Antarctic Treaty System

Demographics
- Population: Uninhabited

Jingle Island is an island 3 km (1.5 nmi) long lying 2 km (1 nmi) northeast of Weller Island, in the Pitt Islands of the Biscoe Islands, Antarctica. It was photographed by Hunting Aerosurveys Ltd in 1956, and mapped from these photos by the Falkland Islands Dependencies Survey. It was named by the UK Antarctic Place-Names Committee in 1959 after Alfred Jingle, a strolling actor in Charles Dickens' The Pickwick Papers.

== See also ==
- List of Antarctic and sub-Antarctic islands
