= Weller Island =

Island off Antarctica

Location of Weller Island

Weller Island (65°27′S 65°24′W) is an island lying east of Snodgrass Island, Pitt Islands, in the Biscoe Islands. Shown on an Argentine government chart of 1957. Named by the United Kingdom Antarctic Place-Names Committee (UK-APC) in 1959 after Samuel Weller, Mr. Pickwick's servant in Charles Dickens' Pickwick Papers.

== See also ==
- List of Antarctic and sub-Antarctic islands
