= Rabot Island =

Island in Antarctica

- Location of Rabot Island

- Location within Antarctica

Geography
- Location: Antarctica
- Coordinates: 65°54′S 65°59′W
- Archipelago: Biscoe Islands
- Length: 8 km (5 mi)
- Width: 3 km (1.9 mi)

Administration
- Administered under the Antarctic Treaty System

Demographics
- Population: Uninhabited

Rabot Island is an island 8 km (5 mi) long and 3 km (2 mi) wide, lying 1.6 km (1 mi) south of Renaud Island in the Biscoe Islands. First charted by the French Antarctic Expedition, 1903–05, under Jean-Baptiste Charcot, who named it for Charles Rabot.

Originally discovered by John Biscoe.

== See also ==
- List of Antarctic islands south of 60° S
- Monflier Point, marks the southwest end of Rabot Island
- Rodman Passage
