= Snodgrass Island =

Island in Antarctica

Coordinates: 65°26′S 65°29′W

Location of Snodgrass Island

Snodgrass Island is an island 2.5 nautical miles (4.6 km) long lying northeast of Pickwick Island, Pitt Islands, in the Biscoe Islands. Shown on an Argentine government chart of 1957. It was named by the United Kingdom Antarctic Place-Names Committee (UK-APC) in 1959 after the fictional character Augustus Snodgrass, a member of the Pickwick Club in Charles Dickens' The Pickwick Papers.

== See also ==
- List of Antarctic and sub-Antarctic islands
