= Renaud Island =

Ice-covered island in Antarctica

- Location of Renaud Island in the Biscoe Islands

- Location within Antarctica

Geography
- Location: Antarctica
- Coordinates: 65°40′S 66°00′W
- Archipelago: Biscoe Islands
- Area: 440 km^{2} (170 sq mi)
- Length: 40 km (25 mi)
- Width: 11 km (6.8 mi)

Administration
- Administered under the Antarctic Treaty System

Demographics
- Population: Uninhabited

Renaud Island is an ice-covered island in the Biscoe Islands of Antarctica, 40 km (25 mi) long and from 6.4 to 16.1 km (4 to 10 mi) (average 11.3 km (7 mi)) wide, lying between the Pitt Islands and Rabot Island. It is separated from the Pitt Islands to the northeast by Mraka Sound, and from Lavoisier Island to the southwest by Pendleton Strait.

== History ==
The Biscoe Islands were discovered in 1832 by a British expedition under John Biscoe and were first roughly surveyed by the French Antarctic Expedition under Jean-Baptiste Charcot, 1903–05 and 1908–10. It was on this second expedition that Renaud Island was first charted and it was named after the French Hydrographer Marie-Joseph-Augustin Renaud.Renaud Island was again roughly surveyed in 1935–36 by the British Graham Land Expedition (BGLE).

A number of the island's geographical features have been individually charted and named. The majority, except where noted below, were first accurately charted on an Argentine government chart of 1957, and named by the United Kingdom Antarctic Place-Names Committee (UK-APC) during the 1950s.

== Geography ==
Weaver Point forms the northernmost end of the island. It was named for American professor of geography John C. Weaver. 2.5 nmi (4.6 km) to the east is Tula Point, the island's northeast extremity. Alino Island lies 1 km south-southeast of Tula Point. The point was named for the Tula, one of the two vessels from Biscoe's expedition.

Zubov Bay is a bay 2.5 miles (4.0 km) wide, indenting the east side of Renaud Island. It was named for Soviet oceanographer Nikolay Nikolaevich Zubov.

Jurva Point is the extremity of a small peninsula forming the southeast end of the island. It was named for Risto Jurva, a Finnish pioneer in sea ice studies. Lively Point forms the southern extremity of Renaud Island. The point was named for the cutter Lively, Biscoe's other vessel. Armstrong Reef extends for 9 km (6 mi) from the south-west end of Renaud Island.

Malmgren Bay indents the west side of the island, immediately north of Speerschneider Point on nearby Belogushev Island. It was named for Swedish meteorologist Finn Malmgren. Maurstad Point lies midway along the west side of the island, 6.5 nautical miles (12 km) north-northeast of Speerschneider Point. It was named for Norwegian geographer Alf Maurstad. Kusunoki Point is on the northwest coast of the island. It was mapped from air photos by Hunting Aerosurveys, 1956–57, and was named by the UK Antarctic Place-Names Committee for Kou Kusunoki, a Japanese sea ice specialist.

== See also ==
- Composite Antarctic Gazetteer
- List of Antarctic and sub-Antarctic islands
- List of Antarctic islands south of 60° S
- Rodman Passage
- SCAR
- Territorial claims in Antarctica
- Weaver Point
