= Pitt Islands =

Island group in Antarctica

Coordinates: 65°23′S 65°29′W

Location of the Pitt Islands within the Biscoe Islands in the Antarctic Peninsula region.

The Pitt Islands are a group of small islands lying immediately off the north extremity of Renaud Island, at the north end of the Biscoe Islands. The name "Pitt's Island," after William Pitt the Younger, the British prime minister, was applied by John Biscoe in 1832 to an island which he erroneously charted as lying about 25 miles West North West of these islands. The present application of Pitt Islands is based on the interpretation of the British Graham Land expedition led by the Australian explorer John Rymill, who charted the island group in 1935–36.

== Islands ==
Map of the Pitt Islands

- Arrowsmith Island
- Fizkin Island
- Jingle Island
- Jinks Island
- Kereka Island
- Knezha Island
- Krivus Island
- Lacuna Island
- Nupkins Island
- Pickwick Island
- Ribnik Island
- Sawyer Island
- Slumkey Island
- Smiggers Island
- Snodgrass Island
- Snubbin Island
- Tambra Island
- Trundle Island
- Tupman Island
- Vaugondy Island
- Weller Island
- Winkle Island
