= Pickwick Island =

Island in Antarctica

- Location of Pickwick Island in the Pitt Islands

- Location within Antarctic Peninsula Location within Antarctica

Geography
- Location: Antarctica
- Coordinates: 65°29′S 65°38′W

Administration
- Administered under the Antarctic Treaty System

Demographics
- Population: Uninhabited

Pickwick Island is the largest of the Pitt Islands, in the Biscoe Islands, Antarctica. It is 9.45 km long in southwest–northeast direction, separated from Renaud Island on the southwest by Mraka Sound, and has its northeast coast indented by Misionis Bay.

The island was very roughly charted by the British Graham Land Expedition (BGLE) under Rymill, 1934–37. More accurately shown on an Argentine government chart of 1957. Named by the United Kingdom Antarctic Place-Names Committee (UK-APC) in 1959 after Samuel Pickwick, founder of the Pickwick Club in Charles Dickens' Pickwick Papers.

== See also ==
- List of Antarctic and sub-Antarctic islands

== Maps ==
- British Antarctic Territory: Graham Coast. Scale 1:200000 topographic map. DOS 610 Series, Sheet W 65 64. Directorate of Overseas Surveys, UK, 1971.
- Antarctic Digital Database (ADD). Scale 1:250000 topographic map of Antarctica. Scientific Committee on Antarctic Research (SCAR). Since 1993, regularly upgraded and updated.
