= Biscoe Islands =

Antarctic archipelago

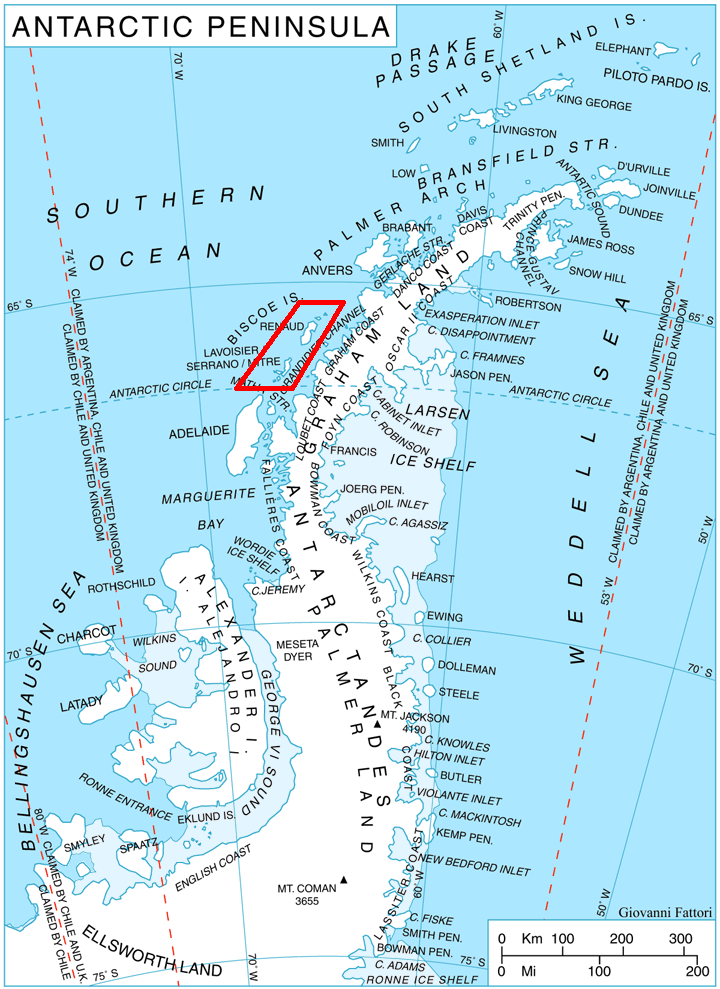
- Location of Biscoe Islands in the Antarctic Peninsula region

- Location within Antarctica

Geography
- Location: Antarctica
- Coordinates: 65°26′S 65°30′W
- Archipelago: Biscoe Islands
- Total islands: Over 60
- Major islands: 6
- Area: 478.38 km^{2} (184.70 sq mi)
- Length: 43.527 km (27.0464 mi)

Administration
- Administered under the Antarctic Treaty System

Biscoe Islands is a series of islands, of which the principal ones are Renaud, Lavoisier (named Serrano by Chile and Mitre by Argentina), Watkins, Krogh, Pickwick and Rabot, lying parallel to the west coast of Graham Land and extending 150 km (81 nmi) between Southwind Passage on the northeast and Matha Strait on the southwest. Another group of islands are the Adolph Islands.

The islands are named for John Biscoe, the commander of an English expedition which explored the islands in March 1832.

== Islands ==
Map of Biscoe Islands

- Adolph Islands
- Barcroft Islands
- Bates Island
- Belding Island
- Dodman Island
- DuBois Island
- Krogh Island
- Laktionov Island
- Lavoisier Island
- Pitt Islands
- Rabot Island
- Renaud Island
- Watkins Island
- Zukriegel Island

== See also ==
- Composite Antarctic Gazetteer
- List of Antarctic islands south of 60° S
- SCAR
- Southwind Passage
- Territorial claims in Antarctica
