= Montojo Island =

Antarctic island

- Location within Antarctica Location within Antarctic Peninsula

Geography
- Location: Antarctica
- Coordinates: 66°25′14″S 67°13′52″W
- Archipelago: Biscoe Islands
- Area: 4.96 ha (12.3 acres)
- Length: 527 m (1729 ft)
- Width: 140 m (460 ft)

Administration
- Administered under the Antarctic Treaty System

Demographics
- Population: uninhabited

Montojo Island (Bulgarian: остров Монтохо, romanized: ostrov Montojo, IPA: [ˈɔstrof monˈtɔxo]) is the predominantly ice-covered rocky island 527 m long in southwest-northeast direction and 140 m wide in the southwest extremity of Biscoe Islands in Antarctica. Its surface area is 4.96 ha.

The feature is named after Frigate Capt. Javier Montojo Salazar (1965-2018), Spanish Navy, who died after falling overboard from the research ship Hespérides in South Bay, Livingston Island. The accident happened while he was a member of the scientific team of a satellite navigation project.

== Location ==
Montojo Island is centred at 66°25′14″S 67°13′52″W, which is 933 m south of Belding Island, 3.82 km southwest of Kuno Point on Watkins Island, 3.26 km west of St. Brigid Island and 3.77 km east by north of Decazes Island. British mapping in 1976.

== Maps ==
- British Antarctic Territory. Scale 1:200000 topographic map. DOS 610 Series, Sheet W 66 66. Directorate of Overseas Surveys, UK, 1976
- Antarctic Digital Database (ADD). Scale 1:250000 topographic map of Antarctica. Scientific Committee on Antarctic Research (SCAR). Since 1993, regularly upgraded and updated

== See also ==
- List of Antarctic and subantarctic islands
