= Hervé Island =

Antarctic island

- Location within Antarctica Location within Antarctic Peninsula

Geography
- Location: Antarctica
- Coordinates: 66°24′11″S 67°10′01″W
- Archipelago: Biscoe Islands
- Area: 14.16 ha (35.0 acres)
- Length: 900 m (3000 ft)
- Width: 290 m (950 ft)

Administration
- Administered under the Antarctic Treaty System

Demographics
- Population: uninhabited

Hervé Island (Bulgarian: остров Ерве, romanized: ostrov Hervé, IPA: [ˈɔstrof ɛrˈvɛ]) is the mostly ice-covered rocky island in the Barcroft group of Biscoe Islands in Antarctica 900 m long in south-southwest to north-northeast direction and 290 m wide. Its surface area is 14.16 ha.

The feature is named after the Chilean geologist Francisco Hervé Allamand, for his contribution to Antarctic geology and the Bulgarian Antarctic programme.

== Location ==
Hervé Island is centred at 66°24′11″S 67°10′01″W, which is 260 m south of Kuno Point on Watkins Island, 1.53 km northwest of St. Brigid Island and 1.1 km southeast of Belding Island.

== Maps ==
- British Antarctic Territory. Scale 1:200000 topographic map. DOS 610 Series, Sheet W 66 66. Directorate of Overseas Surveys, UK, 1976
- Antarctic Digital Database (ADD). Scale 1:250000 topographic map of Antarctica. Scientific Committee on Antarctic Research (SCAR). Since 1993, regularly upgraded and updated

== See also ==
- List of Antarctic and subantarctic islands
