= Todorova Island =

Antarctic island

- Location within Antarctica Location within Antarctic Peninsula

Geography
- Location: Antarctica
- Coordinates: 66°24′13″S 67°15′54″W
- Archipelago: Biscoe Islands
- Area: 30 ha (74 acres)
- Length: 750 m (2460 ft)
- Width: 635 m (2083 ft)

Administration
- Administered under the Antarctic Treaty System

Demographics
- Population: uninhabited

Todorova Island (Bulgarian: остров Тодорова, romanized: ostrov Todorova, IPA: [ˈɔstrof todoˈrɔvɐ]) is the triangular ice-covered island extending 1 km in southwest–northeast direction and 450 m in southeast–northwest direction, separated from the southwest coast of Belding Island in Biscoe Islands by a 1.2 km long passage narrowing to 80 m at points. Its surface area is 26.2 ha. The feature was formed as a result of the retreat of Belding Island's ice cap in 2011–2012.

The island is named after Katya Todorova, Deputy Foreign Minister responsible for Antarctica and member of the Antarctic Place-names Commission (2001–2005), participant in the Bulgarian Antarctic Expedition during the 2002/03 season.

== Location ==
Todorova Island is located at 66°24′13″S 67°15′54″W, which is 4.2 km southwest of Yaglou Point and 3 km northeast of Decazes Island.

== Maps ==
- British Antarctic Territory. Scale 1:200000 topographic map. DOS 610 Series, Sheet W 66 66. Directorate of Overseas Surveys, UK, 1976
- Antarctic Digital Database (ADD). Scale 1:250000 topographic map of Antarctica. Scientific Committee on Antarctic Research (SCAR). Since 1993, regularly upgraded and updated

== See also ==
- List of Antarctic and subantarctic islands
