= St. Isidore Island =

Island in the Biscoe Islands, Antarctic

- Location within Antarctica Location within Antarctic Peninsula

Geography
- Location: Antarctica
- Coordinates: 66°26′18″S 67°05′41″W
- Archipelago: Biscoe Islands
- Area: 60.3 ha (149 acres)
- Length: 1.65 km (1.025 mi)
- Width: 890 m (2920 ft)

Administration
- Administered under the Antarctic Treaty System

Demographics
- Population: uninhabited

St. Isidore Island (Bulgarian: остров Св. Исидор, romanized: ostrov Sv. Isidor, IPA: [ˈɔstrof svɛˈti isiˈdɔr]) is the ice-covered island 1.65 km long in southwest–northeast direction and 890 m wide in the Barcroft group of Biscoe Islands. Its surface area is 60.3 ha.

The feature is named after St. Isidore of Seville (c. 560–636), the unofficial patron saint of internet and computer users, programmers and technicians.

== Location ==
St. Isidore Island is located at 66°26′18″S 67°05′41″W, which is 2.4 km northeast of Bedford Island, 330 m east-northeast of Chakarov Island, 1.5 km southeast of St. Brigid Island and 1.9 km south of Irving Island. British mapping in 1976.

== Maps ==
- British Antarctic Territory. Scale 1:200000 topographic map. DOS 610 Series, Sheet W 66 66. Directorate of Overseas Surveys, UK, 1976
- Antarctic Digital Database (ADD). Scale 1:250000 topographic map of Antarctica. Scientific Committee on Antarctic Research (SCAR). Since 1993, regularly upgraded and updated

== See also ==
- List of Antarctic and subantarctic islands
