= Alcheh Island =

Island of the Biscoe Islands in Antarctica

- Location within Antarctica Location within Antarctic Peninsula

Geography
- Location: Antarctica
- Coordinates: 66°24′47″S 67°05′30″W
- Archipelago: Biscoe Islands
- Area: 21.72 ha (53.7 acres)
- Length: 900 m (3000 ft)
- Width: 340 m (1120 ft)

Administration
- Administered under the Antarctic Treaty System

Demographics
- Population: uninhabited

Alcheh Island (Bulgarian: остров Алшех, romanized: ostrov Alcheh, IPA: [ˈɔstrof ɐɫˈʃɛx]) is the ice-covered island in the Barcroft group of Biscoe Islands in Antarctica 900 m long in south-southwest to north-northeast direction and 340 m wide. Its surface area is 21.72 ha.

The feature is named after the Bulgarian Argentine architect Deiana Alcheh for her support for the infrastructure development of the Bulgarian Antarctic base.

== Location ==
Alcheh Island is centred at 66°24′47″S 67°05′30″W, which is 1.95 km southeast of Watkins Island, 305 m west of Irving Island and 500 m east of St. Brigid Island. British mapping in 1976.

== Maps ==
- British Antarctic Territory. Scale 1:200000 topographic map. DOS 610 Series, Sheet W 66 66. Directorate of Overseas Surveys, UK, 1976
- Antarctic Digital Database (ADD). Scale 1:250000 topographic map of Antarctica. Scientific Committee on Antarctic Research (SCAR). Since 1993, regularly upgraded and updated

== See also ==
- List of Antarctic and subantarctic islands
