= Barcroft Islands =

Island group in Antarctica

Location of Watkins Island in Biscoe Islands

The Barcroft Islands (66°27′S 67°10′W) are a group of small islands and rocks about 5 miles (8 km) in extent, lying close south of Watkins Island, Biscoe Islands. The group comprises St. Brigid, Irving, St. Isidore, Chakarov, Hervé, Montojo, Alcheh, Leppe and Bedford Islands. The islands were mapped from air photos by the Falkland Islands and Dependencies Aerial Survey Expedition (1956–57), and named by the UK Antarctic Place-Names Committee for Sir Joseph Barcroft, a pioneer investigator of the physiological effects of high altitudes and cold.

== See also ==
- List of Antarctic and sub-Antarctic islands
