= Chakarov Island =

Antarctic island

- Location within Antarctica Location within Antarctic Peninsula

Geography
- Location: Antarctica
- Coordinates: 66°26′42″S 67°07′43″W
- Archipelago: Biscoe Islands
- Area: 92 ha (230 acres)
- Length: 2.18 km (1.355 mi)
- Width: 600 m (2000 ft)

Administration
- Administered under the Antarctic Treaty System

Demographics
- Population: uninhabited

Chakarov Island (Bulgarian: Чакъров остров, romanized: Chakarov ostrov, IPA: [t͡ʃɐˈkɤrof ˈɔstrof]) is the ice-covered island 2.18 km long in southwest–northeast direction and 600 m wide in the Barcroft group of Biscoe Islands. Its surface area is 92 ha.

The feature is named after Danail Chakarov, Director of the International and EU Law Directorate, Ministry of Foreign Affairs of Bulgaria responsible for Antarctica and member of the Antarctic Place-names Commission since 2013.

== Location ==
Chakarov Island is located at 66°26′42″S 67°07′43″W, which is 2.85 km southwest of Irving Island, 700 m north of Bedford Island, 5.35 km southeast of Belding Island and 4.7 km south of Watkins Island. British mapping in 1976.

== Maps ==
- British Antarctic Territory. Scale 1:200000 topographic map. DOS 610 Series, Sheet W 66 66. Directorate of Overseas Surveys, UK, 1976
- Antarctic Digital Database (ADD). Scale 1:250000 topographic map of Antarctica. Scientific Committee on Antarctic Research (SCAR). Since 1993, regularly upgraded and updated

== See also ==
- List of Antarctic and subantarctic islands
