= Patricia Ann Webb =

Virologist

- Born: April 5, 1925; Cambridge, England
- Died: January 24, 2005 (aged 79); United States of America
- Education: Agnes Scott College; Tulane University
- Known for: Discovery of Ebola virus
- Spouses: Bennett Elisberg; Karl Johnson
- Children: 2
- Awards: Gorgas Medal
- Scientific career
- Fields: Virology
- Institutions: United States Army Medical Research Unit, Kuala Lumpur (1955–1961); US Public Health Service (USPHS), National Institutes of Health (NIH), Laboratory of Infectious Diseases (1961) and Middle America Research Unit (MARU) (1962–1975); Centers for Disease Control and Prevention (CDC) Special Pathogens Laboratory, Atlanta, GA (1975–1981) and Division of Vector-Borne Viral Diseases, Fort Collins, CO (1981–1988)

Patricia Ann Webb (5 April 1925 – 24 January 2005) was a microbiologist known for her work in characterising and classifying severe contagious diseases including Machupo, Lassa and Ebola viruses.

== Early life and education ==
Webb was born in Cambridge, England in 1925. Her father was medical doctor and Oxford Professor of Pathology Robert A. Webb. She was sent to the United States in 1940 in an evacuation during the Blitz.

Webb received her first degree from Agnes Scott College in 1945 and continued on to medical school at Tulane University. She graduated in 1950 and completed placements at St. Joseph's Mercy Hospital in Pontiac, Michigan and at Kern General Hospital in Bakersfield, California.

== Career and research ==
Webb began her virology research on western equine encephalomyelitis, an outbreak of which affected many children in California in 1952. Between 1955 and 1961, she worked on isolating previously unknown viruses associated fevers in Kuala Lumpur at the US Army Medical Research Unit.

In 1961, Webb joined the US Public Health Service to investigate rhinoviruses. She worked at the NIH's Middle America Research Unit (MARU) in Panama in 1962–1963 on establishing the origins of viral infections, and the role of rodents in particular. MARU closed in 1975 and Webb moved to the CDC in Atlanta. She began to focus on hemorrhagic fevers including Lassa and Ebola. A blood sample from a patient was sent to her lab, but it had cracked during shipping. Webb performed analysis despite the sample's condition, leading to the identification of the Ebola virus. She is credited as one of the discovers of the virus.

Webb worked at a field station in Kenema, Sierra Leone as of 1978 to study the Lassa virus, testing the efficacy of ribavirin as a treatment. She spent the last years of her career from 1981 to 1988 at the CDC Division of Vector-Borne Viral Diseases in Fort Collins investigating transmission vectors between humans and livestock for viral infections. She also worked on models for HIV transmission based on the suggestion that bedbugs could be a potential vector.

== Awards and honours ==
- 1969 Gorgas Medal (shared with Karl Johnson)

== Personal life ==
Webb retired to the UK in 1988. She was described by her peers as being a diligent, disciplined and organised worker, supportive of her younger colleagues. She hosted dinner parties and social events for her staff in the field.

Webb's first husband was rickettsiologist Bennett Elisberg. Her second husband was virologist Karl Johnson. She had two sons.

== Selected publications ==
- Cohen, Robert; O'Connor, Robert E.; Townsend, Thomas E.; Webb, Patricia Ann; McKey, Robert W. (1953-07-01). "Western equine encephalomyelitis: Clinical observations in infants and children". The Journal of Pediatrics. 43 (1): 26–34.
- Webb, Patricia Ann (1965-09-01). "Properties of Machupo Virus". The American Journal of Tropical Medicine and Hygiene. 14 (5): 799–802.
- Murphy, Frederick A.; Webb, Patricia A.; Johnson, Karl M.; Whitfield, Sylvia G.; Chappell, W. Adrian (1970-10-01). "Arenoviruses in Vero Cells: Ultrastructural Studies". Journal of Virology. 6 (4): 507–518.
- PETERS, C. J.; KUEHNE, R. W.; MERCADO, R. R.; LE BOW, R. H.; SPERTZEL, R. O.; WEBB, P. A. (1974-06-01). "HEMORRHAGIC FEVER IN COCHABAMBA, BOLIVIA, 1971". American Journal of Epidemiology. 99 (6): 425–433.
- Pfau, C. J.; Bergold, G. H.; Casals, J.; Johnson, K. M.; Murphy, F. A.; Pedersen, I. R.; Rawls, W. E.; Rowe, W. P.; Webb, P. A.; Weissenbacher, M. C. (1974). "Arenaviruses". Intervirology. 4 (4): 207–213.
- Wulff, Herta; Lange, James V.; Webb, Patricia A. (1978). "Interrelationships Among Arenaviruses Measured by Indirect Immunofluorescence". Intervirology. 9 (6): 344–350.
- Heymann, D. L.; Weisfeld, J. S.; Webb, P. A.; Johnson, K. M.; Cairns, T.; Berquist, H. (1980-09-01). "Ebola Hemorrhagic Fever: Tandala, Zaire, 1977–1978". The Journal of Infectious Diseases. 142 (3): 372–376.
- McCormick, Joseph B.; King, Isabel J.; Webb, Patricia A.; Scribner, Curtis L.; Craven, Robert B.; Johnson, Karl M.; Elliott, Luanne H.; Belmont-Williams, Rose (1986-01-02). "Lassa Fever". New England Journal of Medicine. 314 (1): 20–26.
- Webb, Patricia Ann; Holbrook, Frederick R. (1988). "Chapter 47: Vesicular Stomatitis". The Arboviruses: Epidemiology and Ecology. CRC Press.
- Breman, Joel G.; Johnson, Karl M.; van der Groen, Guido; Robbins, C. Brian; Szczeniowski, Mark V.; Ruti, Kalisa; Webb, Patricia A.; Meier, Florian; Heymann, David L.; Ebola Virus Study Teams (1999-02-01). "A Search for Ebola Virus in Animals in the Democratic Republic of the Congo and Cameroon: Ecologic, Virologic, and Serologic Surveys, 1979–1980". The Journal of Infectious Diseases. 179 (Supplement_1): S139–S147.
