= John Hibbs =

John Hibbs may refer to:

- John Hibbs (academic) (born 1936), American physician-scientist and educator
- John Hibbs (rugby league), New Zealand rugby league footballer
