= David Minard =

American physiologist

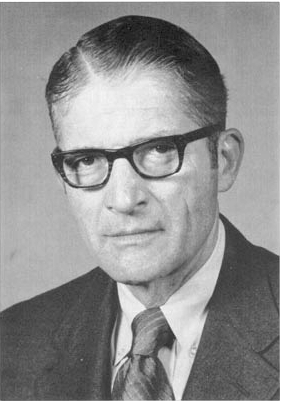
David Minard, MC USN

Captain David Minard, MC, USN (May 23, 1913 – October 9, 2005) was an American physiologist who was heat stress physiologist for Project Mercury, the United States' first human spaceflight.

In the late 1950s, Minard as a captain in the U.S. Navy and head of the physiology department at the Naval Medical Research Institute, helped to develop the Wet Bulb Globe Temperature Index utilized to measure heat stress in the military and other industrial settings. Minard, with Constantin Yaglou, created the wet bulb globe temperature index in 1957 for U.S. Marines training at Parris Island, South Carolina. It is still commonly used as a heat-stress index in the military, steel mills, marathon races and industrial environments. In 1960, Minard used the heat stress index to evaluate the Mercury Seven astronauts for Project Mercury astronauts at the Naval Medical Research Institute in Bethesda, Maryland.

== Life and times ==
In 1913, Minard was born in Fargo, North Dakota. During the time he was not engaged in his professional pursuits, he enjoyed photography and sailing. In 2005, he died after a stroke at Cambridge, Maryland.

== Education ==
Minard graduated from the University of Chicago and received a Ph.D. in physiology in 1937. In 1943, he received a M.D. from the University of Chicago. In 1954, he completed a master's degree in public health from Harvard University.

== Career ==
From 1946 to 1963, Minard worked at the Naval Medical Research Institute as head of the physiology department. In 1963, he moved to the University of Pittsburgh Graduate School of Public Health. In 1974, Minard was named professor emeritus.

Minard was the academic advisor for Heru Satoto, M.D. who graduated in 1969 with a Master's degree in public health. Satoto recalled how Minard helped him in October 1968, complete a study program during the first academic day at the University of Pittsburgh Graduate School of Public Health. At the time Satoto had recently arrived in the U.S. on his first trip abroad and was unfamiliar with the academic system in the United States. Satoto also remembered Minard's assistance with comprehending the Belding-Hatch index. Minard even went so far as to arrange site visits for Satoto to tour other industrial health institutions, Including Johns Hopkins University and UC Berkeley.

After a career in academia, Minard began clinical practice at U.S. Steel in Pittsburgh, Pennsylvania and at the Easton Memorial Hospital in Maryland. He retired in 1980.

== Awards and honors ==
- American College of Preventive Medicine, member
- Gorgas Medal from the Association of Military Surgeons of the United States, 1960
- Outstanding Civilian Service Medal, Department of the Army for service as director of the Commission on Environmental Health of the Armed Services Epidemiological Board, 1973
- New York Academy of Sciences, member, 50 year service award, 1998

== Select publications ==
- Yaglou, C. P., & Minard, D. (1952). Human Endurance to High Levels Heat and Humidity. Naval Medical Research Institute, National Naval Medical Center.
- Yaglou, C. P., & Minard, D. (1956). Prevention of Heat Casualties at Marine Corps Training Centers. Harvard School of Public Health. Boston, MA.
- Yaglou, C. P., & Minard, D. (1957). Control of heat casualties at military training centers. AMA Archives of Industrial Health. 16(4): 302.
- Minard, D., Belding, H. S., & Kingston, J. R. (1957). Prevention of heat casualties. Journal of the American Medical Association. 165(14): 1813–1818.
- Minard, D., Kingston, J. R., & Van Liew, H. D. (1960). Heat stress in working spaces of an aircraft carrier. US Naval Medical Research Institute Research Report, No. 3. Project MR005. 01–0001.01. 403–414.
- Minard, D. (1961). Prevention of heat casualties in Marine Corps recruits. Period of 1955–60, with comparative incidence rates and climatic heat stresses in other training categories. Military medicine. 136: 261.
- Minard, D., & Grayeb Jr, G. A. (1961). Heat stress during Operation Banyan Tree I (No. 5). Naval Medical Research Institute. Bethesda, MD.
- Minard, D. (1963, January). Sweat rate during work and rest at elevated internal temperatures. In Federation Proceedings (Vol. 22, No. 2, p. 177). 9650 ROCKVILLE PIKE, BETHESDA, MD 20814-3998: FEDERATION AMER SOC EXP BIOL.
- Van Reen, R., Minard, D., Consolazio, C. F., & Matoush, L. O. (1963). Nutrition of 96 Naval recruits during a shelter habitability study. J. American Dietetic Association. 42.
- Copman, L., Minard, D., & Dasler, A. R. (1963). Elevation of Internal Body Temperatures During Transient Heat Loads and at Thermal Equilibrium (Vol. 1). NAVAL MEDICAL RESEARCH INST BETHESDA MD.
- Minard, D. (1963). PHYSIOLOGIC AND MEDICAL ASPECTS OF NAVY SHELTER HABITABILITY TRIALS. New York State Journal of Medicine. 63: 3431–3434.
- Minard, D. (1964). Work Physiology. Archives of Environmental Health. 8(3): 427–436.
