= John D. Boice Jr. =

American radiation epidemiologist and health physicist

- Born: December 1945 (age 80); Brooklyn, New York, US
- Education: University of Texas at El Paso; Physics and Mathematics, BS; Rensselaer Polytechnic Institute, MS in Nuclear Engineering; Harvard University; SM in Medical Physics; Harvard University; Harvard School of Public Health; ScD in Epidemiology
- Known for: Radiation Epidemiology; Health Physics
- Scientific career
- Fields: Radiation Epidemiologist and Health Physicist
- Workplaces: Vanderbilt University; Uniformed Services University of the Health Sciences; National Cancer Institute; Radiation Epidemiology Branch
- Thesis: Breast cancer and other malignancies following repeated fluoroscopic chest examinations (1977)
- Doctoral advisor: Richard Monson
- Other academic advisors: Shields Warren; George Hutchison; Goren Svensson; Jane Worcester

John Dunning Boice Jr. is an American radiation epidemiologist and health physicist.

== Life ==
Boice was born in Brooklyn, New York in December 1945. His father, John Dunning Boice Sr., served in the United States Army Air Corps. His mother, Irene, was the daughter of a Pennsylvania coal miner. His father's career necessitated frequent moves for the family during Boice's childhood including three years in France. The family settled in El Paso, Texas when he was fourteen. After graduating from Bel Air High School in the city, he enrolled at Texas Western College (now University of Texas at El Paso) graduating in 1967 with a bachelor's degree in physics and mathematics. He went on to receive a master's degree from Rensselaer Polytechnic Institute in nuclear engineering in 1968 and the following year was commissioned as an officer in the US Public Health Service.

During his early years with the Public Health Service, he continued his post-graduate studies at the Harvard School of Public Health, receiving a second master's degree in medical physics in 1974 and his Doctor of Science degree in epidemiology in 1977. His doctoral thesis was entitled Breast cancer and other malignancies following repeated fluoroscopic chest examinations. He went on to develop the Radiation Epidemiology Branch at the National Cancer Institute and became its first director in 1984. Boice retired from the Public Health Service in 1996 with the rank of Captain and became Scientific Director of the International Epidemiology Institute, a biomedical research organization founded in 1994. Since 2000, he has been Professor of Medicine at Vanderbilt University. Since 2012 he has served as President of the National Council on Radiation Protection and Measurements.

== Distinguished scientific service ==
- Radiation Effects Research Foundation, Science Council member
- International Epidemiology Institute, Scientific Director
- International Commission on Radiological Protection commissioner
- National Council on Radiation Protection and Measurements emeritus member
- United Nations Scientific Committee on the Effects of Atomic Radiation, U.S. delegate
- Veterans Advisory Board on Dose Reconstruction, member

== Editorial service ==
- Journal of the National Cancer Institute, Associate Editor
- Journal of Radiological Protection, International Advisor
- "Radiation Research"., Senior Editor

== Awards ==
- ???? - Distinguished Service Medal from the U.S. Public Health Service
- 1994 - Ernest Orlando Lawrence Award from the U.S. Department of Energy
- 1994 - Gorgas Medal from the American Military Surgeons of the United States
- 1999 - University of Texas at El Paso Distinguished Alumnus Award
- 2002 - Health Physics Society R.S. Landauer Memorial Lecturer, Radiation Risks, a Review of What We Know from Medical Radiation Studies
- 2007 - Health Physics Society Distinguished Scientific Achievement Award
- 2007 - Failla Memorial Lecture from the Greater New York Chapter of the Health Physics Society and the Radiological Medical Physics Society
- 2008 - Harvard School of Public Health Alumni Award of Merit
- 2009 - NCRP Thirty-Third Lauriston S. Taylor Lecturer
