= John Stapp =

American scientist (1910–1999)

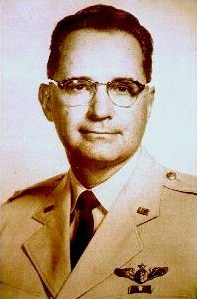
- Stapp in his Air Force uniform
- Born: John Paul Stapp; July 11, 1910; Bahia, Brazil
- Died: November 13, 1999 (aged 89); Alamogordo, New Mexico, U.S.
- Resting place: Fort Bliss National Cemetery; El Paso, Texas, U.S.
- Citizenship: United States
- Education: Baylor University (BA, MA) University of Texas at Austin (PhD); University of Minnesota (MD)
- Known for: Study of deceleration on humans, Stapp's Law
- Awards: Elliott Cresson Medal (1973); Gorgas Medal (1957)
- Scientific career
- Fields: Physics (Acceleration); Physician and Medicinal science

John Paul Stapp (July 11, 1910 – November 13, 1999) was an American career U.S. Air Force officer, flight surgeon, physician, biophysicist, and pioneer in studying the effects of acceleration forces on humans. He was a colleague and contemporary of Chuck Yeager, and became known as "the fastest man on earth". His work on Project Manhigh pioneered many developments for the US space program.

== Early years ==
Born in Salvador de Bahia, Brazil, Stapp was the eldest of four sons of Reverend Charles Franklin Stapp and Mrs. Mary Louise Shannon, Baptist missionaries. He studied in Texas at Brownwood High School in Brownwood and San Marcos Baptist Academy in San Marcos.

In 1931, Stapp received a bachelor's degree from Baylor University in Waco, an MA from Baylor in 1932, a PhD in Biophysics from the University of Texas at Austin in 1940, and an MD from the University of Minnesota, Twin Cities, in 1944. He interned for one year at St. Mary's Hospital in Duluth, Minnesota. Stapp was later awarded an honorary Doctor of Science from Baylor University.

== Military career ==
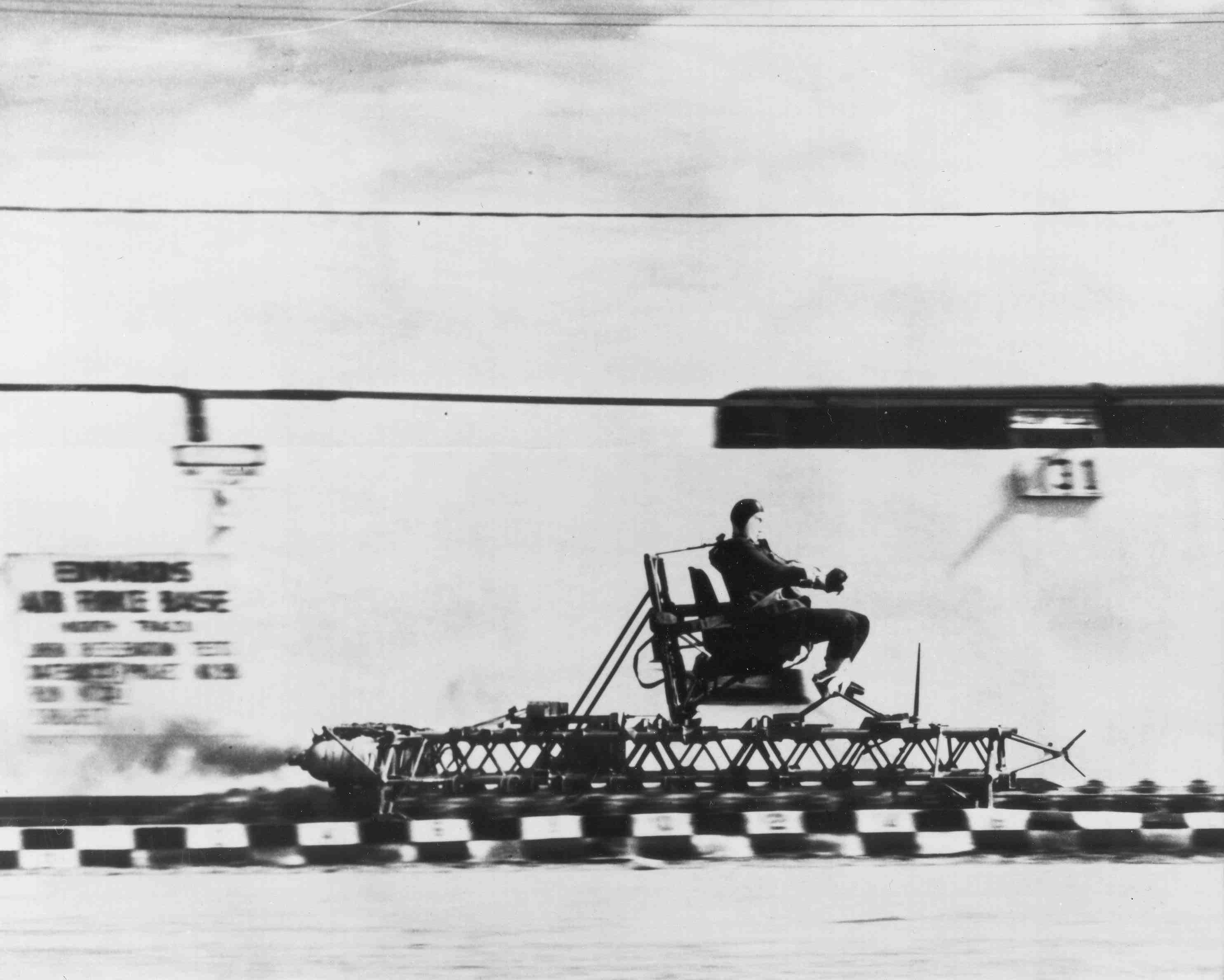
Stapp rides the rocket sled at Edwards Air Force Base

Stapp entered the U.S. Army Air Forces on 5 October 1944 as a physician and qualified as a flight surgeon. On 10 August 1946, he was assigned to the Aero Medical Laboratory at Wright Field as a project officer and medical consultant in the Biophysics Branch and transferred to the U.S. Air Force when it became an independent service in September 1947. His first assignment included a series of flights testing various oxygen systems in unpressurized aircraft at 40,000 ft (12.2 km). One of the major problems with high-altitude flight was the danger of "the bends" or decompression sickness. Stapp's work resolved that problem as well as many others, which allowed the next generation of high-altitude aircraft and the HALO insertion techniques. He was assigned to the deceleration project in March 1947.

In 1967, the Air Force loaned Stapp to the National Highway Traffic Safety Administration to conduct auto-safety research. He retired from the U.S. Air Force in 1970 with the rank of Colonel.

== Work on effects of acceleration ==
As early as 1945, service personnel realized the need for a comprehensive and controlled series of studies into the effects of deceleration on the human body. This led to fundamental concepts that could be applied to better safeguard aircraft occupants during a crash. The initial phase of the program, as set up by the Aero Medical Laboratory of the Wright Air Development Center, was to develop equipment and instrumentation. This was so aircraft crashes might be simulated, and to study the strength factors of seats and harnesses. Human tolerance to the deceleration encountered in simulated aircraft crashes could also be simulated.

The first run on the rocket sled took place on 30 April 1947 with ballast. The sled ran off the tracks. The first human run took place the following December. Instrumentation on all the early runs was in the developmental stage, and it was not until August 1948 that it was adequate to begin recording. By August 1948, sixteen human runs had completed, all in the backward-facing position. Forward-facing runs started in August 1949. Most of the earlier tests ran to compare the standard Air Force harnesses with a series of modified harnesses. This was to determine which type gave the best protection to the pilot.

By June 8, 1951, 74 human runs had been made on the decelerator, 19 with the subjects in the backward position, and 55 in the forward position. Stapp, one of the most frequent volunteers on the runs, sustained a fracture of his right wrist during the runs on two separate occasions, also broke ribs, lost fillings from his teeth and developed bleeding into his retinas that caused temporary vision loss; in one run he survived forces up to 38 g (g-forces).

Stapp's research on the decelerator had profound implications for both civilian and military aviation. For instance, the backward-facing seat concept, which was known before, was given great impetus by the crash research program. It proved beyond a doubt that this position was the safest for aircraft passengers and required little harness support, and that a human can withstand much greater deceleration than in the forward position. As a result, many Military Air Transport Service (MATS) aircraft in USAF and carrier on-board delivery aircraft in USN were equipped or retrofitted with this type of seat. Commercial airlines were made aware of these findings, but still use forward-facing seats. The British Royal Air Force also installed it on many of their military transport aircraft.

As a result of Stapp's findings, the acceleration requirement for fighter seats was increased considerably up to 32 g (310 m/s²). His work showed that a pilot could walk away from crashes when properly protected by harnesses if the seat does not break loose.

The "side saddle" or sideways-facing harness was also developed by Stapp. The new triangular-shaped harness gave vastly increased protection to fully equipped paratroopers. It was made of nylon mesh webbing, fit snugly over the shoulder facing the forward part of the aircraft. It protected the wearer from the force of crash impacts, takeoffs and landing bumps. It withstood a crash force of approximately 8,000 lbf (35,600 N) of force and was developed to replace the old-fashioned lap belts, which gave inadequate protection to their wearers.

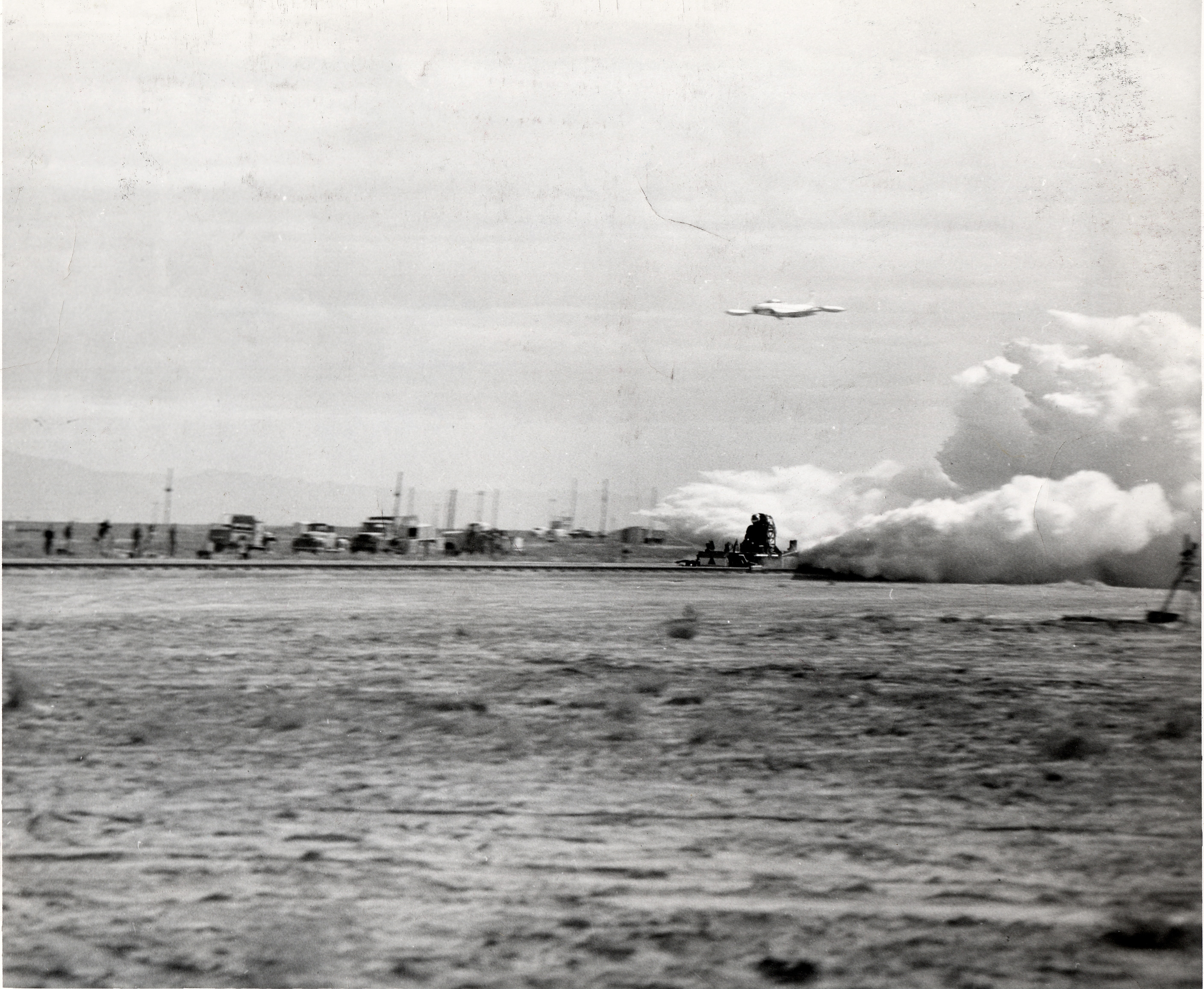
Col.John Stapp Rocket sled stopping.

By riding the decelerator sled, in his 29th and last ride at Holloman Air Force Base in New Mexico, Stapp demonstrated that a human can withstand at least 46.2 g (in the forward position, with adequate harnessing). This is the highest known acceleration voluntarily encountered by a human, set on December 10, 1954. Stapp reached a speed of 632 mph (1,017 km/h), which exceeded the land speed record and made him the fastest man on Earth. Stapp believed that the tolerance of humans to acceleration had not yet been reached in tests. He believed it is much greater than thought possible. He said "I felt a sensation in the eyes, somewhat like the extraction of a molar without anesthetic," but his survival without any permanent injuries supported the development of further safety technologies including the ejection seat.

Also developed by Stapp as an added safety measure was an improved version of the currently used shoulder strap and lap belt. The new high-strength harness withstood 45.4 g (445 m/s²), compared to the 17 g (167 m/s²), which was the limit that could be tolerated with the old combination. The new pilot harness added an inverted "V" strap crossing the pilot's thighs added to the standard lap belt and shoulder straps. The leg and shoulder straps and the lap belt all fastened together at one point, and pressure was distributed evenly over the stronger body surfaces, rather than on the solar plexus, as was the case with the old harness.

== Wind-blast experiments ==
Stapp also participated in wind-blast experiments, in which he flew in jet aircraft at high speeds to determine whether or not it was safe for a pilot to remain with his aircraft if the canopy should accidentally blow off. Stapp stayed with his aircraft at a speed of 570 mph (920 km/h) with the canopy removed, and suffered no injurious effects from the wind blasts. Among these experiments was one of the first high-altitude skydives, executed by Stapp himself. He also supervised research programs in the field of human factors in escape from aircraft.

== Stapp's law ==
Stapp was an inveterate collector of aphorisms and adages, kept a logbook of such, and the practice spread to his entire working group. He published a collection of these in 1992. Stapp is credited with being the popularizer, as well as the author of the final form of the principle known as Murphy's law, "Anything that can go wrong, will go wrong."

Stapp is credited with creating Stapp's Law during his work on the project. It states: "The universal aptitude for ineptitude makes any human accomplishment an incredible miracle."

== Awards ==
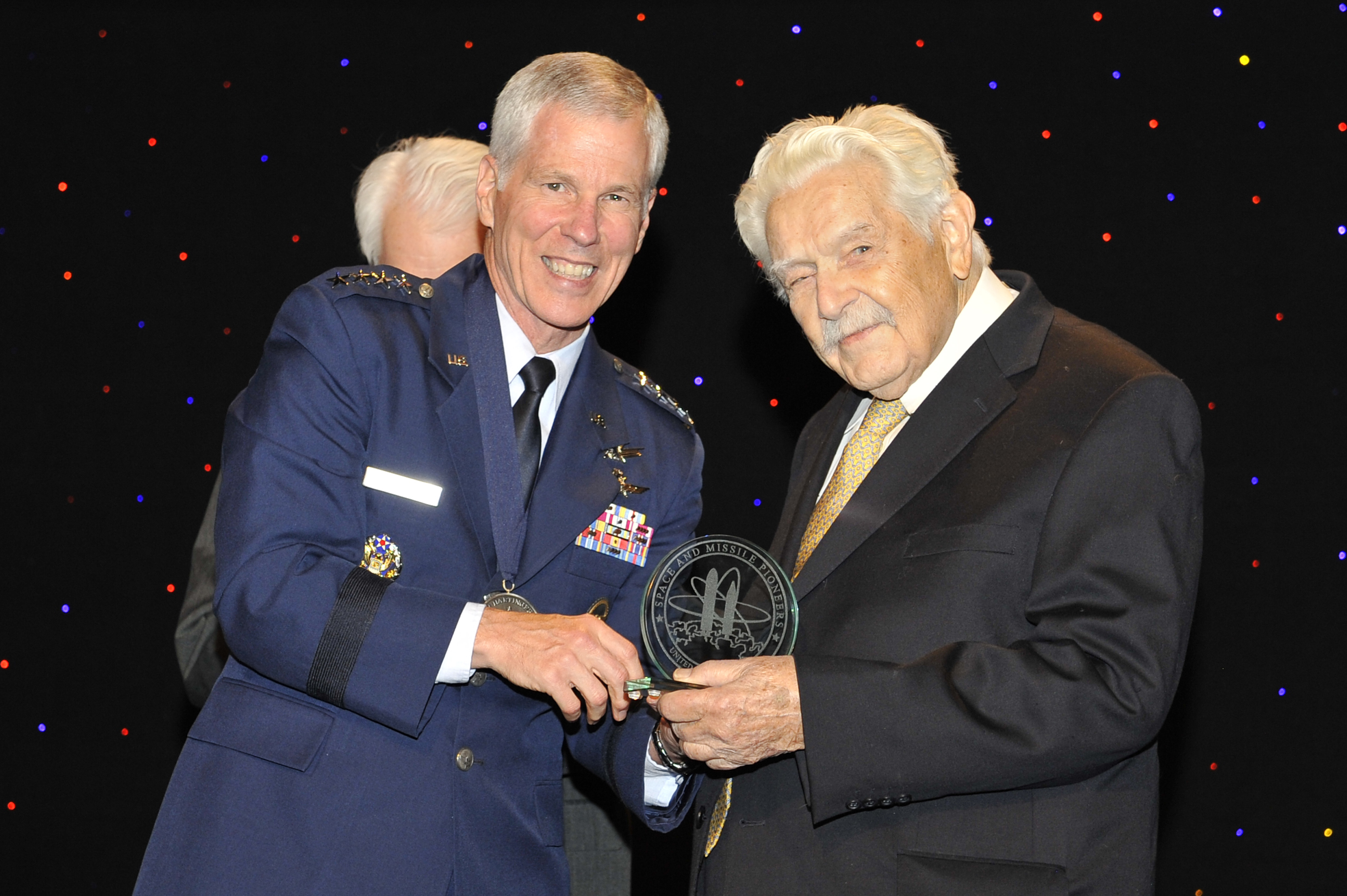
Stapp's brother (right) accepting on his behalf the Air Force Space and Missile Pioneers award in 2012

In 1957, he was presented with the Gorgas Medal from the Association of Military Surgeons of the United States (AMSUS).

In 1973 Stapp was awarded the Franklin Institute's Elliott Cresson Medal.

In 1979 Stapp was inducted into the International Space Hall of Fame. The New Mexico Museum of Space History, which houses the International Space Hall of Fame, includes a John P. Stapp Air & Space Park which holds Sonic Wind No. 1, a rocket sled ridden by Stapp.

In 1985, Stapp was inducted into the National Aviation Hall of Fame for his work in aviation safety.

In 1991, Stapp was awarded the National Medal of Technology, "for his research on the effects of mechanical force on living tissues leading to safety developments in crash protection technology".

In 2012, 13 years after his death, Stapp was awarded the Air Force Space and Missile Pioneers award. The award recognizes individuals for their significant role in the history of Air Force space and missile programs.

== Later life ==
In the years before his death, Stapp was president of the New Mexico Research Institute, headquartered in Alamogordo, New Mexico, as well as chairman of the annual Stapp Car Crash Conference. This event meets to study car crashes and determine ways to make cars safer. In addition, Stapp was honorary chairman of the Stapp Foundation, which is underwritten by General Motors and provides scholarships for automotive engineering students.

Stapp died peacefully at his home in Alamogordo at the age of 89.

== See also ==
- Land speed record for rail vehicles
- List of Ig Nobel Prize winners
