= Joseph Gilbert Hamilton =

American professor and physicist

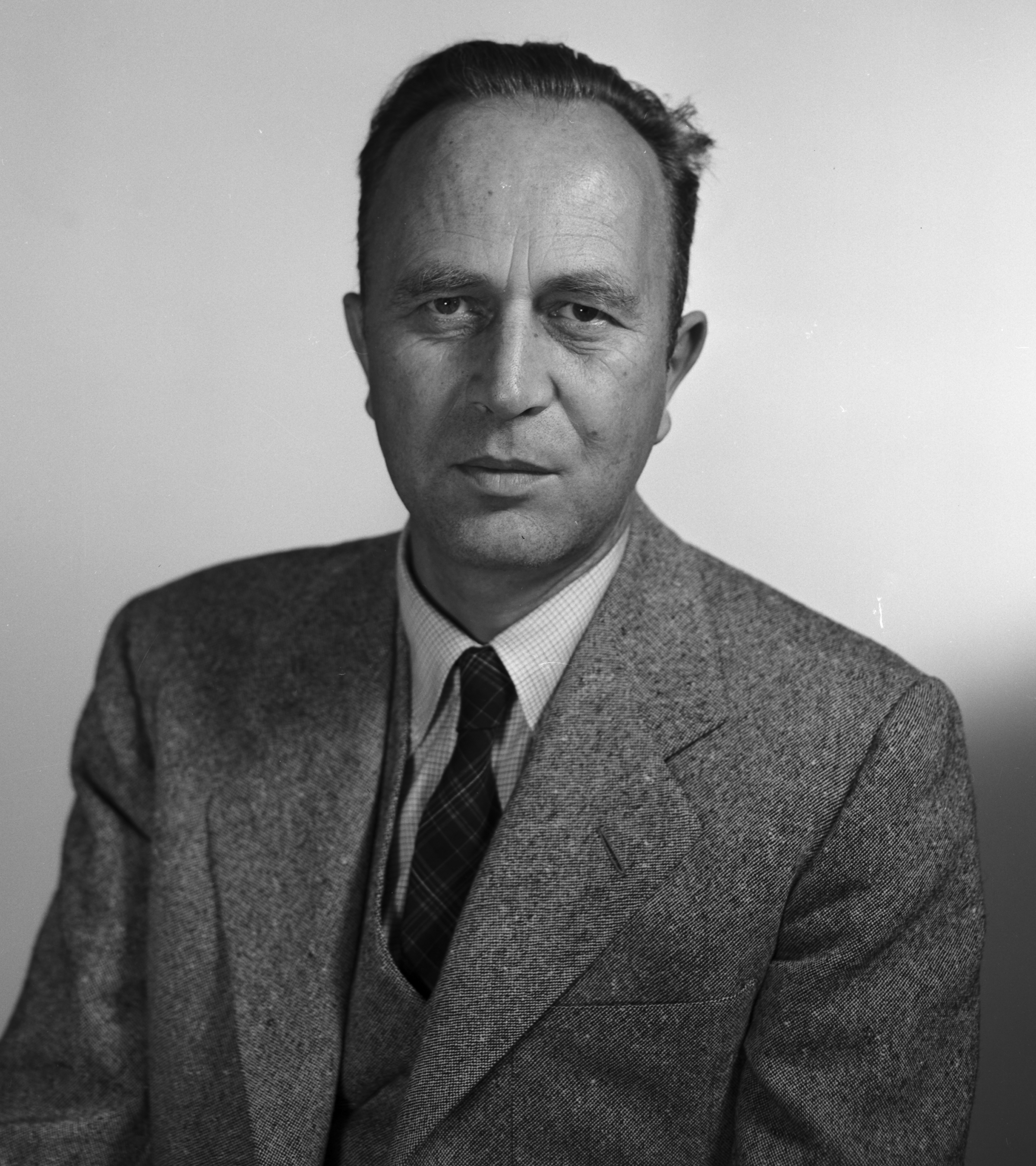
- Hamilton in 1954
- Born: November 11, 1907
- Died: February 18, 1957 (aged 49)
- Education: University of California
- Known for: medical effects of exposure to radioactive isotopes, unethical human experimentation
- Spouse: Leah Rinne
- Scientific career
- Fields: Physics
- Workplaces: Lawrence Berkeley National Laboratory

Joseph Gilbert Hamilton (November 11, 1907 – February 18, 1957) was an American professor of Medical Physics, Experimental Medicine, General Medicine, and Experimental Radiology as well as director (1948–1957) of the Crocker Laboratory, part of the Lawrence Berkeley National Laboratory. Hamilton studied the medical effects of exposure to radioactive isotopes, which included the use of unsuspecting human subjects.

He was married to painter Leah Rinne Hamilton.

== Early work ==
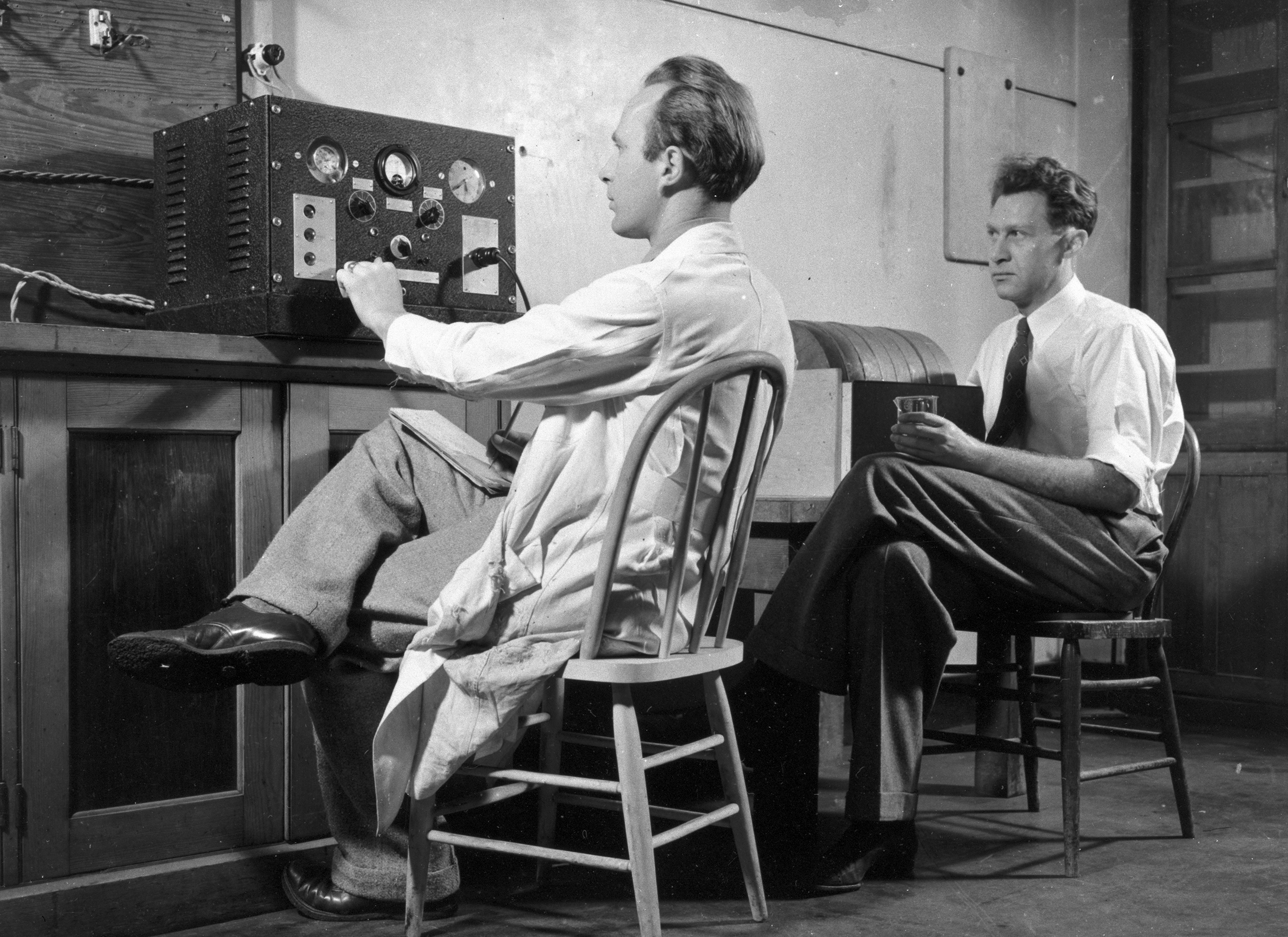
Hamilton (left) in 1939 with fellow physicist Robert Marshak who is voluntarily drinking a radioactive sodium solution

Hamilton received his B.S. in Chemistry in 1929 from the University of California. He studied medicine in Berkeley and interned at the University of California Hospital, San Francisco. He was awarded his M.D. degree in 1936. At that time the cyclotron in Berkeley was among the first to produce useful amounts of radioactive isotopes which could be used in studies of their effects on living tissue. In a series of papers published in 1937 Hamilton detailed early medical trials using radioactive sodium, followed by papers detailing the use of the radioactive isotopes of potassium, chlorine, bromine, and iodine. Radioactive iodine was found to be particularly useful in the diagnosis and treatment of thyroid disorders.

== Human testing ==
Concern was expressed over the safety of Manhattan Project laboratory personnel working with newly isolated plutonium in 1944. Hamilton led a team to conduct toxicity experiments on rats. Finding the results unsatisfactory, Hamilton participated in the decision to continue the trials with human subjects. The teams conducted trials in secret from 1945 to 1947.

Three teams headed by Hamilton, Louis Hempelmann and Wright Haskell Langham carried out trials, injecting plutonium into 18 unsuspecting human patients and measuring its concentration in excreta. Joseph Gilbert Hamilton's team injected three of the subjects at University of California Hospital, San Francisco.

Albert Stevens, CAL-1, was diagnosed with terminal stomach cancer, which researchers soon found to have been an ulcer. Stevens is significant as he is recorded to have survived the highest known accumulated radiation dose of any human. He lived 20 years after the injection and died at 79 years of age.

Simeon Shaw, CAL-2, was 4 years old at the time of injection and diagnosed with bone cancer. Shaw lived for 255 days post injection, with his cause of death being recorded as bone cancer.

Elmer Allen, CAL-3, was 36 at the time of injection and lived for 44 years post injection, with his cause of death being recorded as respiratory failure, pneumonia. He died in 1991 shortly before Eileen Welsome could interview him for her work in exposing the trials.

Hamilton's studies of isotope retention in humans, especially of radioactive strontium and the transuranic elements, were the principal reason for the U.S. Atomic Energy Commission setting of far lower tolerance limits of these substances than had been theorised before trials. The Atomic Energy Commission terminated this series of human trials in 1950.

== The "Buchenwald touch" memo ==
Once the AEC took over control of the Manhattan Project's various roles, Hamilton returned to his work at Berkeley. In a memo written in 1950, Hamilton gave some recommendations to the AEC's Director of Biology and Medicine, Shields Warren. Hamilton wrote that large primates like "chimpanzees ... [should] be substituted for humans in the planned studies on radiation's cognitive effects." He further warned that by using humans the AEC would be open "to considerable criticism," since the experiments as proposed had "a little of the Buchenwald touch." Eugene Saenger would be the one who carried out these experiments from 1960 to 1971 at the University of Cincinnati, exposing "at least 90 cancer patients to large radiation doses."

== Death and legacy ==
Hamilton died from radiation-induced leukemia at the age of 49. His name was added to the Monument to the X-ray and Radium Martyrs of All Nations erected in Hamburg, Germany.
