= John Hibbs (academic) =

John B. Hibbs Jr.
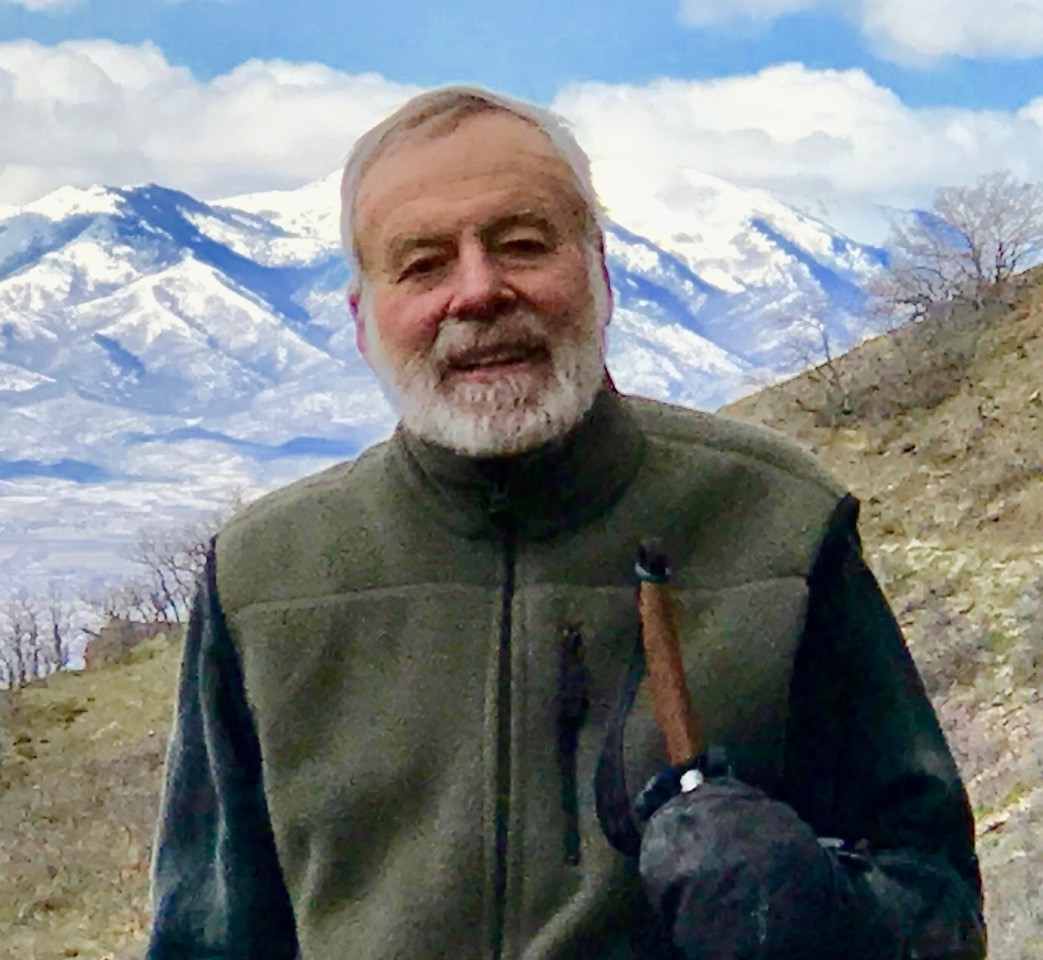
- Hibbs in 2020
- Born: August 18, 1936 (age 90); Uniontown, Pennsylvania
- Other names: John Hibbs Jr; John B Hibbs Jr
- Citizenship: United States
- Known for: Nitric Oxide biochemistry

Academic background
- Education: AB, History (1958); MD (1962)
- Alma mater: Dartmouth College; University of Pittsburgh School of Medicine

Academic work
- Discipline: Internal Medicine, Infectious Diseases, Investigation of macrophages in resistance to microbial pathogens and cancer cells
- Institutions: University of Utah School of Medicine (1971-2011); University of Utah

John B. Hibbs Jr. is an American physician-scientist and educator. He is distinguished professor emeritus in the Department of Medicine at the University of Utah.

He is a self- taught biochemist known for the discovery of the direct synthesis of L-citrulline and nitrogen oxides from L-arginine by murine activated macrophages, published in January 1987. This reaction was inhibited strongly by the non-toxic NG-monomethyl-L-arginine molecule. These observations provided the biochemical tools needed to establish the new and unexpected field of nitric oxide biochemistry and made possible its rapid initial progress in cardiovascular and neural physiology. In 1988, he directly measured the gas nitric oxide, simultaneously with Michael Marletta, showing that it is the proximal nitrogen oxide produced during the biological oxidation of a terminal guanidino nitrogen atom of L-arginine.

== Early life and education ==
Hibbs was born in Uniontown, Pennsylvania in 1936 where his father was a scholarly practicing physician. Hibbs attended Dartmouth College (1954-1958) and the University of Pittsburgh School of Medicine (1958-1962). His internship was at the University of Oregon Hospitals (1962-1963). He then served as a medical officer in the U.S. Army. Following military service he returned to the University of Oregon as a resident in Internal Medicine (1966-1968). His training in clinical infectious diseases and in research examining host resistance to intracellular pathogens was at Stanford University Medical Center under the mentorship of Jack Remington (1969-1971).

== Career ==
Hibbs joined the University of Utah School of Medicine faculty as an assistant professor in 1971. He rose through the academic ranks to become a distinguished professor in 1999. He served as chief of the Infectious Diseases Division of the university-affiliated Veterans Affairs Medical Center from 1971 to 1989 and chief of Infectious Diseases Division of the University of Utah Health Sciences Center from 1989 to 2011.

== Research ==
In 1964, as a medical officer in the U.S. Army, Hibbs participated in the Bolivian hemorrhagic fever outbreak investigation directed by Karl Johnson. This experience stimulated his interest in infectious diseases and in research. As a result, after completing training in Internal Medicine at the University of Oregon, he began Infectious Diseases Fellowship training at Stanford University in 1969. The research portion of the training was in the laboratory of Jack Remington. There he showed that mice with chronic infection with intracellular protozoan parasites, which act as a persistent stimulus for cytokine production and macrophage activation, had increased resistance to malignant cell growth. In vitro activated macrophages from these mice expressed nonspecific cytotoxicity for malignant cells. Prior to these experiments, macrophage mediated cytotoxicity for malignant cells was thought to be due only to immunologically specific mechanisms. After completing Infectious Diseases training in 1971, Hibbs joined the Infectious Diseases Division faculty at the University of Utah. There he began a search for a biochemical explanation for nonspecific cytotoxicity mediated by activated macrophages. These experiments led to the discovery of the synthesis of L-citrulline and nitrogen oxides, including nitric oxide per se, from L-arginine, by mouse activated macrophages. He then, with colleagues, described a pattern of metabolic inhibition caused by nitric oxide in mammalian target cells and the involvement of nitric oxide in mouse activated macrophage antimicrobial activity. This work established nitric oxide as an important component of the inflammatory response. He also showed that humans receiving the cytokine interleukin-2 for treatment of refractory malignant disease produced high levels of nitric oxide. “Murad, in his Nobel lecture, noted Hibbs’ contributions and that Hibbs had never been sufficiently recognized for his important observations. ‘Many in the field, including myself,’ confides Billiar, ‘feel that John Hibbs’ contributions to the discovery of the nitric oxide pathway were significant enough to warrant sharing the Nobel.’ He was nominated for the prize.” More recently he discovered extracellular energy producing metabolism carried out in highly diluted lysates of human peripheral blood leukocytes.

== Personal life ==
Hibbs and his wife Françoise Arnaud have three children and three grandchildren. They live in Salt Lake City, Utah.

== Awards and honors ==
- 1979 - American Society for Clinical Investigation
- 1981 - The Marie T. Bonazinga Award for Excellence in Research, Society for Leukocyte Biology
- 1990 - Association of American Physicians
- 1993 - The William S. Middleton Award for Outstanding Achievement in Medical Research, Department of Vetern Affairs
- 1994, 1996, 1997, and 2002 - Outstanding Teacher Award, University of Utah
- 1998 - Nominated for the Nobel Prize
- 2004 - Distinguished Scholarly and Creative Research Award, University of Utah
- 2004 - The University of Pittsburgh Legacy Laureate Award, University of Pittsburgh

== Books ==
- The Biology of Nitric Oxide 1. Physiological and Clinical Aspects. Edited by S. Moncada, M.A. Marletta, J.B. Hibbs Jr, and E.A. Higgs. Portland Press. London and Chapel Hill, 1992, ISBN 1-855-78-0127
- The Biology of Nitric Oxide 2. Enzymology, Biochemistry, and Immunology. Edited by S. Moncada, M.A. Marletta, J.B. Hibbs Jr, and E.A. Higgs. Portland Press. London and Chapel Hill, 1992. ISBN 1-855-78-0135
