= Francisco Hervé =

Chilean geologist

- Born: 1942 (age 83–84)
- Education: University of Chile
- Known for: Contributions to the geology of Chile and Antarctica
- Awards: Medalla “Juan Brüggen” (1985)
- Scientific career
- Fields: Tectonics, Paleogeography, Structural geology
- Workplaces: University of Chile; Hokkaido University; University of Paris; Andrés Bello National University

Francisco Hervé Allamand (born 1942) is a Chilean geologist known for his contributions to the paleogeography and tectonics of Chile and Antarctica.

Together with I. Fuenzalida, E. Araya and A. Solano he named the Liquiñe-Ofqui Fault in 1979.

In a 2012 contribution to the blog of El Mercurio he expressed concern for the sudden emergence of new geology degrees offered by both traditional and non-traditional private Chilean universities stating that granting new degrees involves complex and costly tasks.

Hervé Island in Antarctica is named after Francisco Hervé.
