= Shields Warren =

American pathologist

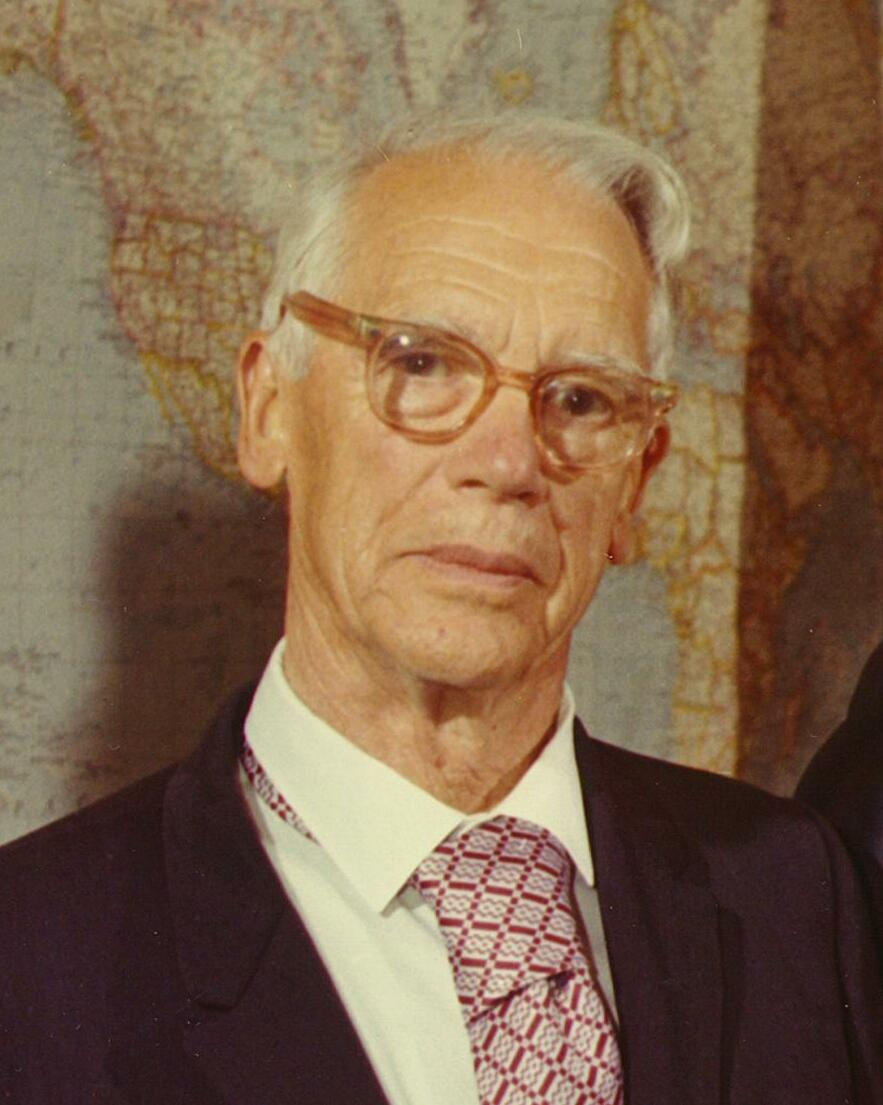
- Warren in 1971
- Born: February 26, 1898; Cambridge, Massachusetts, US
- Died: July 1, 1980 (aged 82); Mashpee, Massachusetts, US
- Education: Boston University; Harvard Medical School
- Known for: The Buchenwald touch
- Awards: Enrico Fermi Award
- Scientific career
- Fields: Health physics Pathology; Biological effects of ionizing radiation
- Workplaces: U.S. Navy; Harvard Medical School; New England Deaconess Hospital; U.S. Atomic Energy Commission
- Notable students: Eleanor Josephine MacDonald; John D. Boice, Jr.

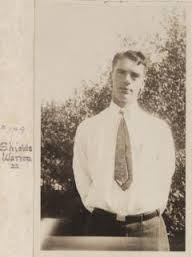
Shields Warren

Shields Warren (February 26, 1898 – July 1, 1980) was an American pathologist. He was among the first to study the pathology of radioactive fallout. Warren influenced and mentored Eleanor Josephine Macdonald, epidemiologist and cancer researcher.

== Early life ==
Warren was born in 1898 in Cambridge, Massachusetts. He graduated with an A.B in 1918 from Boston University and with an M.D. in 1923 from Harvard Medical School. From 1923 to 1925, he was an assistant in pathology at Boston City Hospital where he completed his medical residency in 1927.

== Career ==
At Harvard Medical School, he began teaching as an instructor in pathology in 1925, was promoted to assistant professor in 1936, and became a full professor of pathology in 1948. In 1927, he became a pathologist at New England Deaconess Hospital (which later became part of Beth Israel Deaconess Medical Center) and was promoted to pathologist-in-chief in 1946, serving in that post for 36 years.

He also served as pathologist-in-chief at New England Baptist Hospital and at Pondville State Hospital and was a consultant for several other hospitals. He established New England Deaconess Hospital's Cancer Research Institute and served as the director of the Institute until he resigned from the directorship in 1968. He held the Shields Warren Mallinckrodt Professorship of Clinical Research at Deaconess Hospital and Harvard Medical School

Warren's research focused primarily on cancer, thyroid disorders, diabetes, and atomic radiation. During his cancer research in 1932, he discovered that cancer susceptibility varied from person to person. This study laid the foundation for future investigations on vulnerability and immunity to tumors. He also helped to establish the field of radiobiology by determining that certain mammal tissues were more susceptible to radiation damage, therefore disproving the Law of Bergonie and Tribondeau. During World War II, he served as a Captain in the U.S. Naval Reserve, and after Japan's surrender in 1945, Warren led the medical section of the Naval Technical Mission that aimed to aid and study the survivors of the atomic bombings in Hiroshima and Nagasaki. This was the first systematic study of radioactive fallout ever conducted.

Warren's various research projects involved the American Society for Experimental Pathology, the U.S. Atomic Energy Commission, the U.S. Department of Defense, the National Academy of Sciences, NASA, and the Veterans' Administration. Warren was a member of the American Academy of Arts and Sciences, National Academy of Sciences, and the American Philosophical Society. He was a trustee with the American Board of Pathology from 1944 to 1958.

== Awards and honors ==
- Shields Warren Festschrift
- Ward Burdick Award for Distinguished Service to Clinical Pathology, American Society for Clinical Pathology, 1949
- Banting Medal for Scientific Achievement Award, American Diabetes Association, 1953
- Pathologist of the Year, Meritorious Service Award, College of American Pathologists, 1955
- Albert Einstein Medal and Award, 1962
- James Ewing Lecture, Society of Surgical Oncology, 1962
- American Cancer Society National Award, 1968
- Enrico Fermi Award, US DOE, 1971
- Holmes Lecture, New England Roentgen Ray Society, 1972
- Distinguished Scientific Achievement Award, Health Physics Society,1974
- Gold Headed Cane Award, Association of Clinical Scientists, 1980
- Founders Award, Health Physics Society, 1985

== Personal life ==
On August 11, 1923, he married Alice Springfield. They had two children. Warren died on July 1, 1980, in Mashpee, Massachusetts.

== Selected publications ==
=== Journal articles ===
- "Exposure Rates and Protective Measures against Radiation". Proceedings of the American Philosophical Society. vol. 107, no. 1 (February 15, 1963): 18–20.

=== Monographs ===
- The Sanitary Survey as an Instrument of Instruction in Medical Schools. with Joseph Rosenau Milton. (Harvard Medical School Department of Preventive Medicine and Hygiene Sanitary Surveys), 1924.
- The Cancer Problem. (Series on the Early Recognition of Cancer, vol. 1). American Cancer Society, 1954.
- Medical Effects of the Atomic Bomb in Japan. with Ashley W. Oughterson. (National Nuclear Energy Series. Manhattan Project Technical Section. Division 8, vol. 8), 1956.
- The Pathology of Ionizing Radiation (Monograph in the Carl Vernon Weller lecture series). The University of Michigan, 1961.

=== Books ===
- Sanitary Survey of Rochester, New Hampshire. Cambridge: Harvard University Press, 1922.
- Medical Science for Everyday Use. Philadelphia: Lea & Febiger, 1927.
- The Pathology of Diabetes Mellitus. Philadelphia: Lea & Febiger, 1930.
- Tumors of Dermal Appendages. with Olive Gates and Wesley N. Warvi. Cambridge: Harvard University Cancer Commission, 1943.
- A Handbook for the Diagnosis of Cancer of the Uterus: By Use of Vaginal Smears. with Olive Gates and George N. Papanicolaou. Cambridge: Harvard University Press, 1947.
- Introduction to Neuropathology. with Samuel Pendleton Hicks. New York: McGraw-Hill, 1950. .
- Atomic Bomb Injury—Radiation. with Charles Little Dunham, Eugene P. Cronkite, and George Veach Le Roy. Atomic Bomb Casualty Commission, 1951.
- The Pathology of Diabetes Mellitus. with Philip Medford LeCompte, and Merle A. Legg. Ann Arbor: The University of Michigan Press, 1966.
- Tumors of the Thyroid Gland. with William A. Meissner. Washington, D.C.: Armed Forces Institute of Pathology, 1969.

=== As editor ===
- Synopsis of the Practice of Preventive Medicine: As Applied in the Basic Medical Sciences and Clinical Instruction at the Harvard Medical School. Cambridge: Harvard University Press, 1929.
