= Leppe Island (Biscoe Islands) =

Antarctic island

- Location within Antarctica Location within Antarctic Peninsula

Geography
- Location: Antarctica
- Coordinates: 66°26′04″S 67°08′00″W
- Archipelago: Biscoe Islands
- Area: 27.17 ha (67.1 acres)
- Length: 1 km (0.6 mi)
- Width: 430 m (1410 ft)

Administration
- Administered under the Antarctic Treaty System

Demographics
- Population: uninhabited

Leppe Island (Bulgarian: остров Лепе, romanized: ostrov Leppe, IPA: [ˈɔstrof ˈɫɛpɛ]) is the ice-covered island in the Barcroft group of Biscoe Islands in Antarctica 1 km long in west-southwest to east-northeast direction and 430 m wide. Its surface area is 27.17 ha.

The feature is named after the Chilean biologist Marcelo Leppe Cartes, director of the Chilean Antarctic Institute, for his support for the Bulgarian Antarctic programme.

== Location ==
Leppe Island is centred at 66°26′04″S 67°08′00″W, which is 4.36 km southeast of Belding Island, 4 km south of Watkins Island and 520 m north-northwest of Chakarov Island. British mapping in 1976.

== Maps ==
- British Antarctic Territory. Scale 1:200000 topographic map. DOS 610 Series, Sheet W 66 66. Directorate of Overseas Surveys, UK, 1976
- Antarctic Digital Database (ADD). Scale 1:250000 topographic map of Antarctica. Scientific Committee on Antarctic Research (SCAR). Since 1993, regularly upgraded and updated

== See also ==
- List of Antarctic and subantarctic islands
