= Eleanor Josephine Macdonald =

American university teacher and epidemiologist (1906-2007)

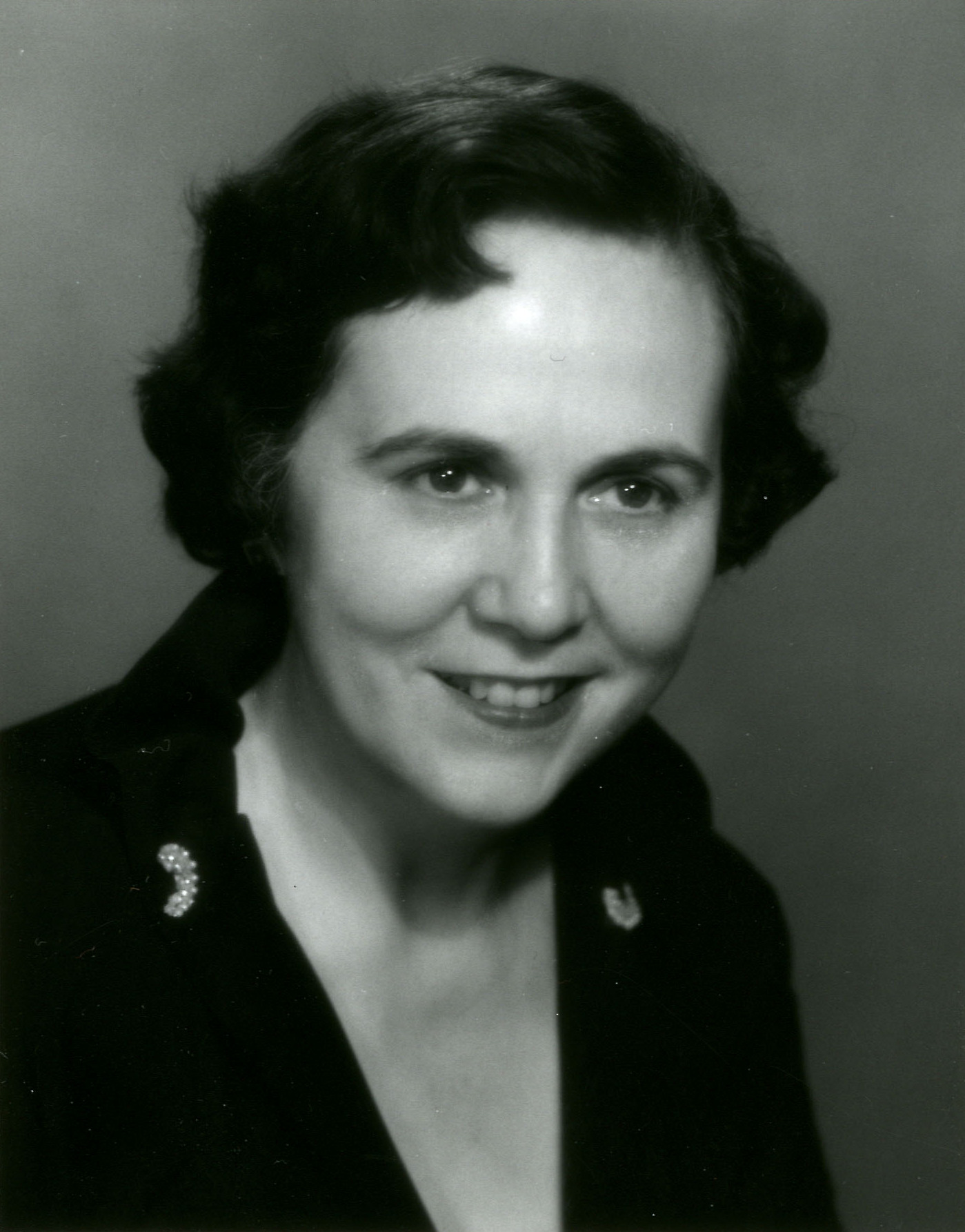
Eleanor J. Macdonald, pioneer epidemiologist and cancer researcher.

Eleanor Josephine Macdonald (4 March 1906 – 26 July 2007) was a pioneer American cancer epidemiologist and cancer researcher influenced and mentored by Edwin Bidwell Wilson and Shields Warren. One of the earliest proponents of the idea that cancer was a preventable disease. She established the first cancer registry in the United States in Connecticut.

== Life and times ==
Eleanor Josephine Macdonald the daughter of Angus Alexander and Catherine Macdonald was born in the Boston suburb of West Somerville, Massachusetts, in 1906. She died in Houston, Texas, in 2007. Angus Alexander, whose family had come from Scotland, was an engineer at A.T. & T. and Catharine Boland Macdonald, whose family were of Anglo-Irish descent was a concert pianist. She attended Radcliffe College and graduated in 1928 with A.B. degrees in music, history of literature, and English. For 4 years following graduation, she performed as a professional cellist.

== Epidemiology career ==
Robert B. Greenough, M.D., chairman of the Cancer Committee in Massachusetts, and friend of the family asked Macdonald for assistance in writing a research paper on cystic mastitis. This led her to become an epidemiologist. Macdonald studied the fundamentals of epidemiology and statistics at Harvard University School of Public Health. At Harvard she worked with Edwin Bidwell Wilson who tutored her in statistical approaches and the Ronald Fisher methods. Macdonald was then appointed as the Epidemiologist in Boston's State Cancer Program at the Division of Adult Hygiene for director Dr. Herbert L. Lombard. She was an early adopter of the new computer technology that became available to researchers. Since about 1930 Macdonald worked with Remington Rand punch cards. From 1940 to 1948 she worked for the Connecticut State Department of Health as statistician. Then to Memorial Hospital in New York. Macdonald was asked by Dr. Thomas Parran, Jr., U.S. Surgeon General to set up a national cancer registry as she had done in Connecticut. In 1948 her work in Connecticut led to publishing the seminal work "The Incidence and Survival in Cancer". After this she went on to M.D. Anderson Hospital in Houston, Texas.

Her work in New England caught the attention of Dr. R. Lee Clark who recruited her to be the head of the newly created Department of Epidemiology at the University of Texas M. D. Anderson Hospital and Tumor Institute. In 1948 she went to Houston to become Professor of Epidemiology at MD Anderson. During her tenure she developed a 200-code (referred to as the anticipatory code) method for transcribing patient charts that provided statistical information to M. D. Anderson's physicians and researchers. In 1982 Macdonald retired from MD Anderson and from 1974 continued to serve as professor emeritus. She died at home in Houston, Texas on 26 July 2007.

== Awards and honors ==
- Honorary member, Statistical consultant, Massachusetts Medical Society
- Honorary member, American Radium Society
- Honorary member, American Association for Cancer Research
- Myron Gordon Award, 1972 (for contributions to understanding the role of race, sex and sun exposure to melanoma)
- Outstanding Service Award, American Cancer Society, 1973
- Distinguished Service Award, M.D. Anderson Cancer Center
- Texas Medical Center Hall of Fame

== Professional service ==
- American Public Health Association
- American Association for the Advancement of Science
- Consultant, National Advisory Cancer Council, Washington, D.C.

== Select publications ==
- Lombard, Herbert L., and Eleanor Josephine Macdonald. (1931). "State-Aided Cancer Clinics as Seen by the Practicing Physician." New England Journal of Medicine. 205(20): 949–951.
- Macdonald, Eleanor J. (February 1936). Fundamentals of Epidemiology. Radcliffe Quarterly. 19–22.
- Macdonald, E. J. (1938). Accuracy of the Cancer Death Records. American Journal of Public Health and the Nation's Health. 28(7): 818–824.
- Macdonald, Eleanor J., and Frances A. Macdonald. (1940). "Evaluation of Cancer Control Methodology." American Journal of Public Health and the Nation's Health. 30(5): 483–490.
- Macdonald, Eleanor J. (1948). "Malignant melanoma in Connecticut." Annals of the New York Academy of Sciences. 4: 71.
- Macdonald, E. J. (1948). The present incidence and survival picture in cancer and the promise of improved prognosis. Bulletin of American College of Surgeons.
- Clark Jr, R. Lee, & Macdonald, E. J. (1949). The University of Texas, MD Anderson Hospital for Cancer Research. Medical woman's journal. 56(8): 34–37.
- Clark, R. Lee, & Macdonald, E. J. (1953). The natural history of melanoma in man. Pigment cell growth. 139-148
- Wall, J. A., Fletcher, Gilbert H., & Macdonald, E. J. (1954). Endometrial biopsy as a standard diagnostic technique; a review of 445 cases. The American Journal of Roentgenology, Radium Therapy, and Nuclear Medicine. 71(1): 95.
- Macdonald, E. J. (1959). The epidemiology of skin cancer. Journal of Occupational and Environmental Medicine. 1(9): 522.
- Macdonald, E. J. (1963). The epidemiology of melanoma. Annals of the New York Academy of Sciences. 100(1): 4-17.
- University of Texas MD Anderson Hospital and Tumor Institute, Houston. Department of Epidemiology, & Macdonald, E. J. (1968). The Survey of Cancer in Texas 1944-1966: Present Status and Results, June 30, 1968. Prepared by Eleanor J. Macdonald and the Staff of the Department of Epidemiology.
