= Gorgas Medal =

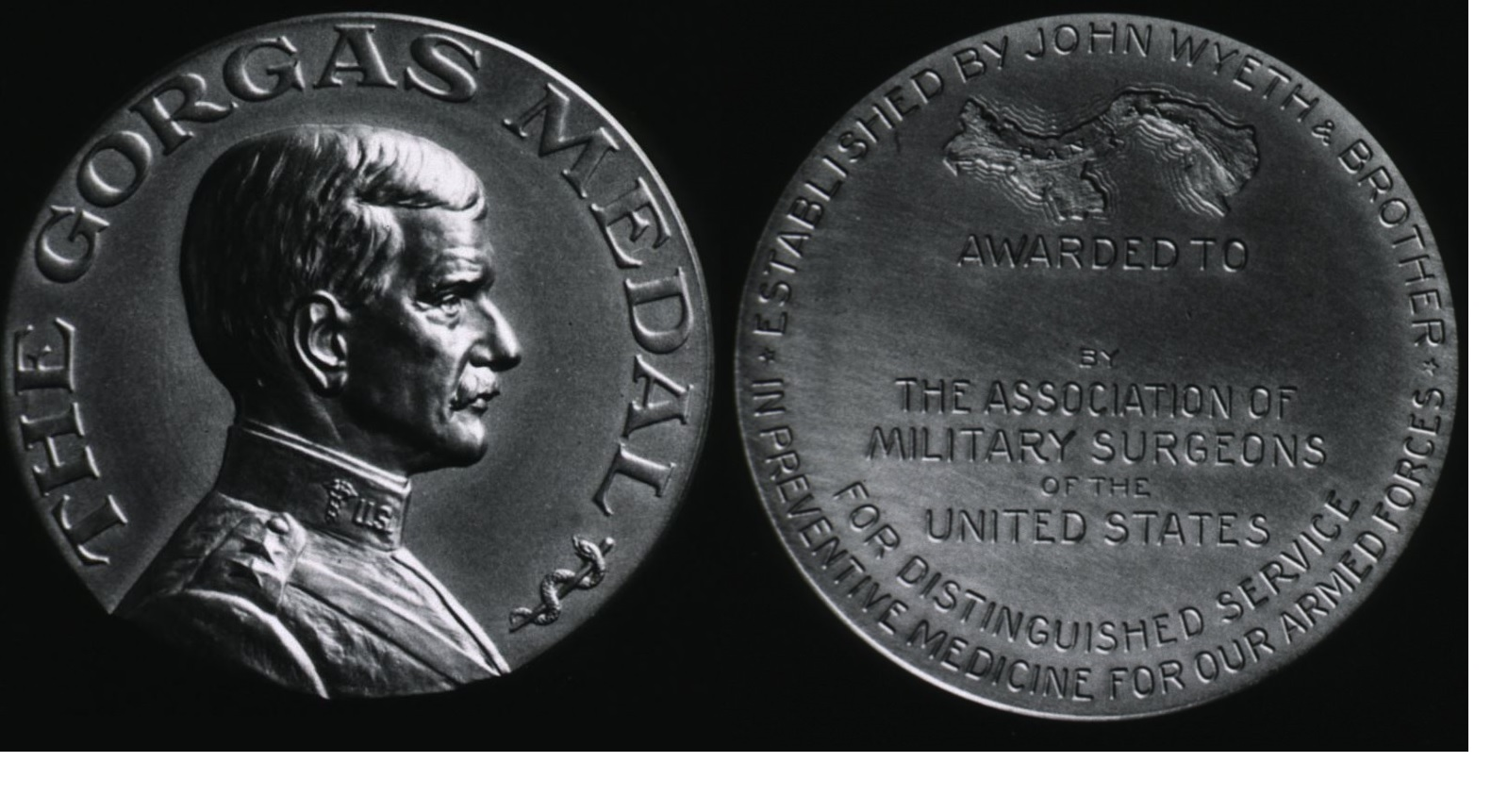
Gorgas Medal

The Gorgas Medal was originally established as an annual award in 1915 by the Medical Reserve Corps Association of New York in honor of Surgeon General William C. Gorgas, U.S. Army. The award was based on a writing competition open to members of the U.S. Army Medical Corps, the U.S. Army Medical Reserve Corps, and to Medical Corps members of other “organized militia”. Surgeon General Gorgas appointed Colonel Charles Richard, Lieutenant Colonel Champe C. McCulloch, Jr., and Major Eugene R. Whitmore, Medical Corps, to form a review board and act as judge and jury for the writing competition. These officers were members of the Army Medical School faculty.

In 1942, the Gorgas Medal was established by Wyeth Laboratories of Philadelphia, Pennsylvania to honor Major General William Crawford Gorgas. The award was to be presented annually for ‘distinguished work in preventative medicine’. The award consisted of a Silver Medal, a scroll, and an honorarium of $500. In 2010, the Association of Military Surgeons of the United States (AMSUS) restructured the awards program and the Gorgas Medal and Prize was no longer awarded. AMSUS took over administering the Gorgas Medal for Wyeth and renamed the award the William Gorgas Preventive Medicine Award. AMSUS is the Society of Federal Health Professionals. The award was given to an individual for 'distinguished work in preventive medicine, clinical application, education or research'. To be eligible for the award, nominees had to be veterinarians, environmental engineers or sanitation engineers, or from other discipline not from other individual professional award categories from any of the five health agencies represented by AMSUS. The criteria for receiving the award required the individual to have demonstrated accomplishments in accordance with the following objectives:

- Contributions to the eradication, control and/or prevention of disease, including, but not limited to, development of new vaccines and treatment protocols
- Educational endeavors leading to a healthier population
- Development of modern biological defense medical countermeasures
- Development and identification of emerging technologies that may occur during any phase of medical product development from inception through licensure (Recognition may include the full range of technologies on how new products are manufactured, formulated and administered.)

AMSUS. "AMSUS Annual Awards Program" (PDF).

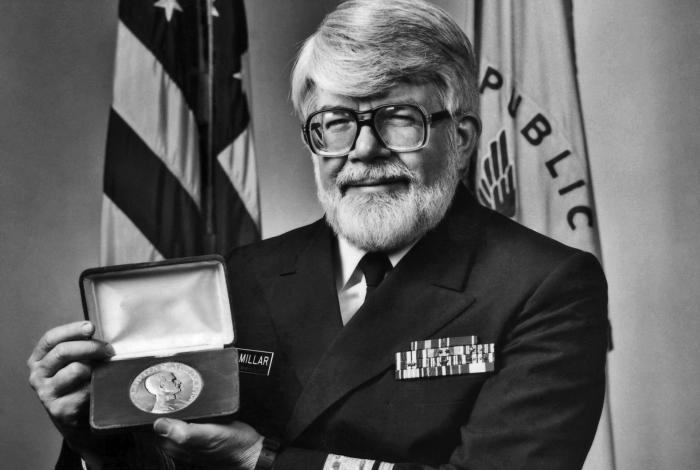
J Donald Millar with Gorgas Medal 1987

== List of Gorgas Medal Awardees by decade ==
=== 2000s ===
- 2009, Colonel Lisa Keep, United States Army Medical Corps
- 2008, Lieutenant Colonel Rodney L. Coldren, United States Army Medical Corps
- 2007, Colonel Ralph L. Erickson, United States Army Medical Corps
- 2006, Captain Sven E. Rodenbeck, United States Public Health Service
- 2005, Captain Laurence Reed, United States Public Health Service
- 2004, Colonel Bonnie L. Smoak, United States Army Medical Corps
- 2003, Rear Admiral Robert C. Williams, United States Public Health Service
- 2002, Colonel Raj K. Gupta, United States Army Medical Service Corps
- 2001, Colonel Patrick W. Kelley, United States Army Medical Corps
- 2000, John D. Hamilton, M.D., Veterans Administration

=== 1990s ===
- 1999, Captain Frederick Burkle, Jr., MC, United States Naval Reserve
- 1998, Rear Admiral Douglas B. Kamerow, United States Public Health Service
- 1997, Colonel Michael W. Benenson, United States Army Medical Corps
- 1996, Captain Robert N. Hoover, United States Public Health Service
- 1995, Colonel William H. Bancroft, United States Army Medical Corps
- 1994, Captain John D. Boice, Jr., United States Public Health Service
- 1993, Rear Admiral James O. Mason, United States Public Health Service
- 1992, Captain John Richard Gorham, United States Public Health Service
- 1991, Captain George James Hill, MC United States Naval Reserve
- 1990, Colonel Alfred K. Cheng, USAF MC

=== 1980s ===
- 1989, Captain Joseph F. Fraumeni, Jr., United States Public Health Service
- 1988, Lieutenant Colonel Wilbur Kearse Milhous, MSC United States Army
- 1987, John Donald Millar, M.D., United States Public Health Service
- 1986, John V. Bennett, M.D., United States Public Health Service
- 1985, Colonel Llewellyn J. Legters, United States Army Medical Corps Retired
- 1984, Lieutenant Colonel Ernest T. Takafuji, United States Army Medical Corps
- 1983, Colonel George D. Lathrop, USAF MC
- 1983, Lieutenant Colonel William H. Wolfe, USAF MC
- 1983, Dr. Richard A. Albanese
- 1982, Captain Robert Lincoln Kaiser, United States Public Health Service
- 1981, Captain Eugene G. Rudd, United States Army Medical Corps
- 1980, Commander Richard R. Hooper, MC USN

=== 1970s ===
- 1979, Colonel Craig J. Canfield, United States Army Medical Corps
- 1978, Colonel George D. Lathrop, USAF MC
- 1977, Robert H. Purcell, M.D., United States Public Health Service
- 1976, Captain George M. Lawton, MC USN
- 1975, Colonel Phillip K. Russell, United States Army Medical Corps
- 1974, Martin D. Young, Sc.D.
- 1973, Captain Charles W. Ochs, MC USN
- 1972, Dr. Robert M. Chanock, United States Public Health Service
- 1971, Malcolm S. Artenstein, M.D., United States Army
- 1970, Colonel Dan Crozier, United States Army Medical Corps

=== 1960s ===
- 1969, Patricia A. Webb, M.D., United States Public Health Service
- 1968, Samuel W. Simmons, M.D., United States Public Health Service
- 1967, Captain James R. Kingston, MC USN
- 1966, Colonel William D. Tigertt, United States Army Medical Corps
- 1965, Lieutenant Colonel Edward L. Buescher, United States Army Medical Corps
- 1964, Dr. Harry D. Pratt, United States Public Health Service
- 1963, Charles C. Shepard, Chief Project Unit, United States Public Health Service
- 1962, Lieutenant Colonel William S. Gochenour, United States Army Veterinary Corps
- 1961, Dr. James Shaw (Asst. SG, United States Public Health Service)
- 1960, Captain David Minard, M.D., Ph.D., Master of Public Health, MC USN

=== 1950s ===
- 1959, Colonel Albert J. Glass, United States Army Medical Corps
- 1958, Lieutenant Commander John H. Ebersole, M.D., MC USN
- 1957, Colonel John Paul Stapp, USAF MC
- 1956, Captain Robert S. Poos, MC USN
- 1955, Colonel Victor A. Byrnes, USAF MC
- 1954, Dr. G. Robert Coatney, United States Public Health Service
- 1953, Colonel Douglas B. Kendricks, Jr., United States Army Medical Corps
- 1953, Captain Lloyd R. Newhouser, MC USN
- 1952, Brigadier General James Stevens Simmons, United States Army Retired
- 1951, Rear Admiral C.S. Stephenson, United States Army Retired
- 1950, Major General Malcolm C. Grow, United States Air Force Retired

=== 1940s ===
- 1949, Dental Director H. Trendley Dean, United States Public Health Service
- 1948, Major General Edgar Erskine Hume, United States Army Medical Corps
- 1947, Major General Paul R. Hawley, United States Army Retired
- 1946, Brig. General Raymond A. Kelser, United States Army Retired
- 1945, Captain L.T. Coggeshall, MC USNR
- 1944, Commander James J. Sapero, MC USN
- 1943, Surgeon General Hugh S. Cumming, United States Public Health Service Retired
- 1942, Rear Admiral E.R. Stitt, United States Navy Retired
- 1942, Brigadier General Jefferson Randolph Kean, United States Army Retired
- 1942, Brigadier General Frederick Fuller Russell, United States Army Medical Corps, Reserve

== See also ==
- List of medicine awards
