= St. Brigid Island =

Antarctic island

- Location within Antarctica Location within Antarctic Peninsula

Geography
- Location: Antarctica
- Coordinates: 66°25′06″S 67°07′35″W
- Archipelago: Biscoe Islands
- Area: 222 ha (550 acres)
- Length: 2.7 km (1.68 mi)
- Width: 1.4 km (0.87 mi)

Administration
- Administered under the Antarctic Treaty System

Demographics
- Population: uninhabited

St. Brigid Island (Bulgarian: остров Св. Бригита, romanized: ostrov Sv. Brigita, IPA: [ˈɔstrof svɛˈta briˈɡitɐ]) is the ice-covered island 2.7 km long in southwest–northeast direction and 1.4 km wide, largest in the Barcroft group of Biscoe Islands. Its surface area is 222 ha.

It is named after St. Brigid of Kildare (c. 451–525), the patron saint of scholars.

== Location ==
St. Brigid Island is located at 66°25′06″S 67°07′35″W, which is 1.28 km south of Watkins Island, 1.18 km west of Irving Island, 3.9 km north of Bedford Island and 3 km southeast of Belding Island, based on British mapping in 1976.

== Maps ==
- British Antarctic Territory. Scale 1:200000 topographic map. DOS 610 Series, Sheet W 66 66. Directorate of Overseas Surveys, UK, 1976
- Antarctic Digital Database (ADD). Scale 1:250000 topographic map of Antarctica. Scientific Committee on Antarctic Research (SCAR). Since 1993, regularly upgraded and updated

== See also ==
- List of Antarctic and subantarctic islands
