= Kuno Point =

Kuno Point (66°24′S 67°10′W) is the southwestern extremity of Watkins Island in the Biscoe Islands, Antarctica. It was mapped from air photos taken by the Falkland Islands and Dependencies Aerial Survey Expedition (1956–57), and was named by the UK Antarctic Place-Names Committee after Yasau Kuno, a Japanese physiologist who has specialized in the study of human sweating and its effect as a temperature regulator.
