= Yaglou Point =

Yaglou Point (66°23′S 67°12′W) is the northern point of Belding Island, Biscoe Islands. Mapped from air photos taken by Falkland Islands and Dependencies Aerial Survey Expedition (FIDASE) (1956–57). Named by United Kingdom Antarctic Place-Names Committee (UK-APC) for Constantin P. Yaglou, American physiologist who has specialized in the reactions of the human body to cold environments.
