= Decazes Island =

Island in Antarctica

Decazes Island (66°26′S 67°20′W) is an island 0.8 km (0.5 mi) long, lying 2.4 km (1.5 mi) southwest of Belding Island at the southwestern extremity of the Biscoe Islands. The island is one of the largest of many small islets and rocks that fringe the northern side of Matha Strait. The vicinity was charted by the French Antarctic Expedition, 1908–10, under Jean-Baptiste Charcot, who applied the name "Pointe Decazes" to the south end of an island in this approximate position. The original application has been altered in recent years, and the name Decazes is now established in usage for the entire island described.

== See also ==
- List of Antarctic and sub-Antarctic islands
