= Bedford Island =

Small island in the Biscoe Islands

Bedford Island (66°28′S 67°9′W) is an island about 1 nautical mile (2 km) long, lying at the south end of the Barcroft Islands in the Biscoe Islands, 700 m south of Chakarov Island. It was mapped from air photos taken by the Falkland Islands and Dependencies Aerial Survey Expedition (1956–57), and named by the UK Antarctic Place-Names Committee for Thomas Bedford, an English physicist who specialized in the measurement of the physical environment of man.

== See also ==
- List of Antarctic and sub-Antarctic islands
