= Karl Johnson (virologist) =

American virologist

Karl M Johnson (14 May 1929 – 10 October 2023) was an American virologist, known for discovering Machupo virus, Hantaan virus, and Ebola virus. He has held key positions in the American Society of Tropical Medicine and Hygiene.

== Education and career ==
Johnson studied medicine at the University of Rochester, and earned an M.D. and completed his medical residency at the Presbyterian Hospital in New York. He then worked at the National Institute of Allergy and Infectious Diseases (NIAID) with respiratory cold viruses.

Johnson moved to the National Institutes of Health (NIH) field laboratory in the Panama Canal Zone. At this time he was studying hemorrhagic fever agents. His time at the Centers for Disease Control (CDC) subsequently the Centers for Disease Control and Prevention in Atlanta, led to field work in Africa and Korea, where he established the first completely suited Level-4 laboratory of “special pathogens” for the safe study of viruses capable of infection by the respiratory route. While at the CDC, Johnson’s team isolated and named Ebola virus in Zaire and was instrumental in the discovery of Hantaan virus in Korea, as well as serving as Chief of the Special Pathogens Branch, Virology Division. He heavily contributed to the tropical virology field.

In 1981, he left the CDC to work for the United States Army Medical Research Institute of Infectious Diseases as the Program Director of Hazardous Viruses.

He has also served as an adjunct professor of Medicine and biology at the University of New Mexico, where his energy is focused on hantaviral disease and ecology.

== Naming the viruses ==
Johnson is credited with naming the Ebola virus. In an attempt to avoid stigmatization of communities, he sought alternate names that would give geographical relations, but would not directly name specific communities. He named the Ebola virus after a river near the Yambuku community in Northern Zaire, in which the virus was originally found - the Ebola river.

== Awards and honors ==
In 2005 he received the Walter Reed Medal from the American Society of Tropical Medicine and Hygiene. Johnson was the 2011 recipient of the Ed Nowakowski Senior Memorial Clinical Virology Award.

== Family life ==
Johnson was the eldest of three children; he and his first wife Donna had three children.
