= Irving Island =

Island in Antarctica

Irving Island (66°25′S 67°4′W) is a small island at the northeastern end of the Barcroft Islands, in the Biscoe Islands, Antarctica. It is situated 1.18 km east of St. Brigid Island and 1.9 km north of St. Isidore Island. The island was mapped from air photos taken by the Falkland Islands and Dependencies Aerial Survey Expedition (1956–57), and was named by the UK Antarctic Place-Names Committee for Laurence Irving, an American physiologist who has specialized in the effects of a polar environment.

== See also ==
- List of Antarctic and sub-Antarctic islands
