= Watkins Island =

Antarctic island

Watkins
- Location of Watkins Island

- Location within Antarctica

Geography
- Location: Antarctica
- Coordinates: 66°22′S 67°05′W
- Archipelago: Biscoe Islands
- Length: 8 km (5 mi)

Administration
- Administered under the Antarctic Treaty System

Watkins Island is a low lying, ice-covered island 5 miles (8 km) long, lying 3 miles (5 km) southwest of Lavoisier Island in the Biscoe Islands. The island was first mapped by the French Antarctic Expedition under Jean-Baptiste Charcot, 1903–05 and 1908–10, but remained unnamed until resighted by the BGLE under Rymill, 1934–1937. He gave the name Mikkelsen Island after Ejnar Mikkelsen, Danish Arctic explorer. In applying the name, Rymill was unaware of the existence of Mikkelsen Islands 75 mi (121 km) southwestward, named in 1908–1910 by Charcot. To avoid confusion of the two, the UK-APC recommended in 1952 that the Rymill naming be amended. The new name, Watkins Island, commemorates Gino Watkins, leader of the British Arctic Air Route Expedition, 1930–1931. A new feature, Mikkelsen Bay, has been named for Ejnar Mikkelsen.

== See also ==
- List of Antarctic islands south of 60° S
