= Frances Trollope bibliography =

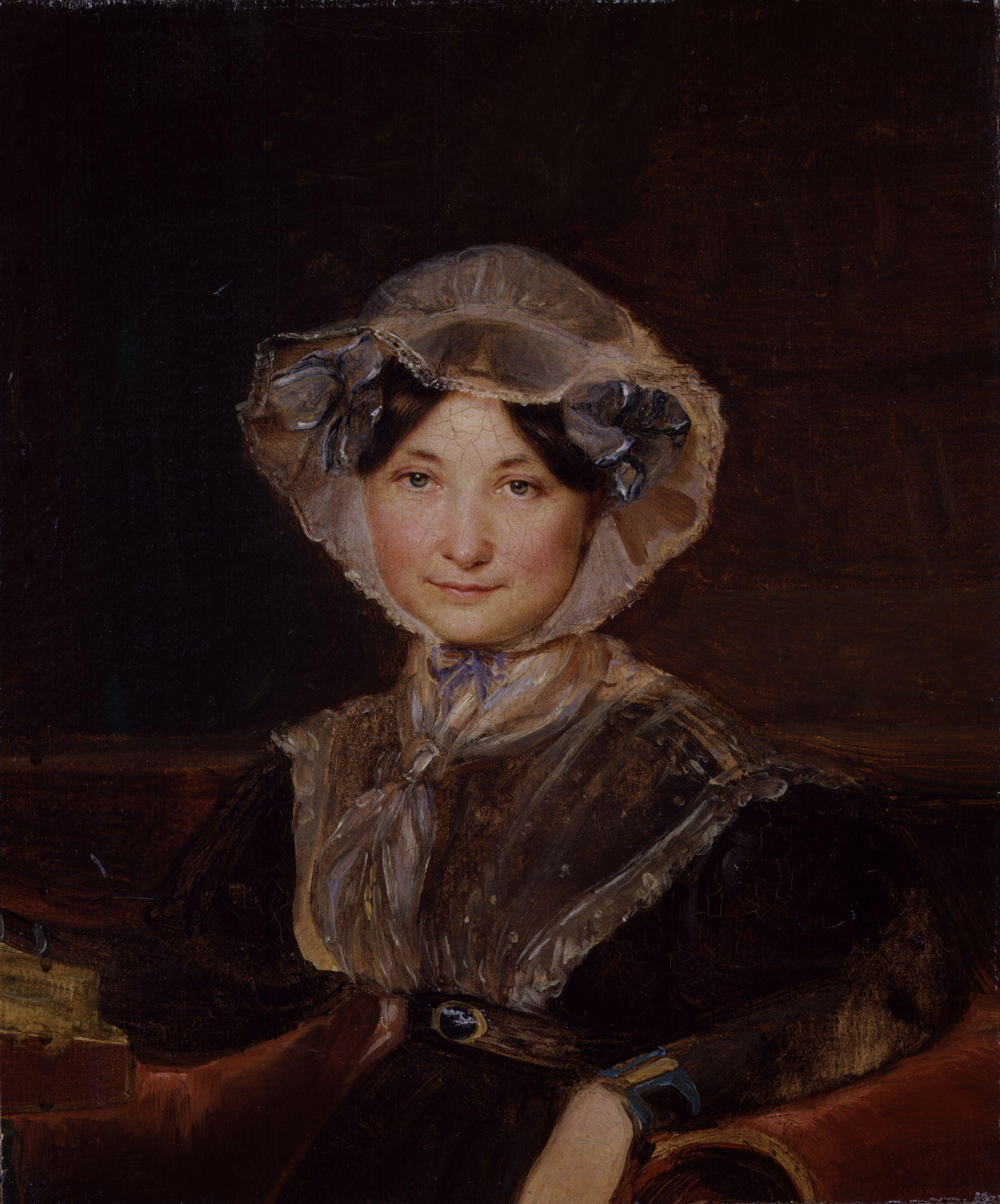
Portrait of Frances Trollope by Auguste Hervieu, c. 1832

This is a bibliography of the works of Frances Trollope.

== Novels ==
- The Refugee in America (1832)
- The Abess: A Romance (1833)
- Tremordyn Cliff (1835)
- The Life and Adventures of Jonathan Jefferson Whitlaw: or Scenes on the Mississippi (1836)
- The Vicar of Wrexhill (1837)
- A Romance of Vienna (1838)
- The Widow Barnaby (1839)
- The Life and Adventures of Michael Armstrong, the Factory Boy (1839–40 serial) (1840 book)
- The Widow Married: a Sequel to The Widow Barnaby (1839–40 serial) (1840 book)
- One Fault: a Novel (1840)
- Charles Chesterfield: or The Adventures of a Youth of Genius (1840–41 serial) (1841 book)
- The Blue Belles of England (1841–42 serial) (1842 book)
- The Ward of Thorpe-Combe (1842)
- The Barnabys in America: or Adventures of the Widow Wedded (1842–43 serial) (1843 book)
- Jessie Phillips: a Tale of the Present Day (1842–43 serial) (1843 book)
- Hargrave: or The Adventures of a Man of Fashion (1843)
- The Laurringtons: or Superior People (1844)
- Young Love: a Novel (1844)
- The Robertses on Their Travels (1844–46 serial) (1846 book)
- The Attractive Man: a Novel (1846)
- Father Eustace: a Tale of the Jesuits (1847)
- The Three Cousins: a Novel (1847)
- Town and Country: a Novel (1848)
- The Young Countess: or Love and Jealousy (1848)
- The Lottery of Marriage: a Novel (1849)
- The Old World and the New: a Novel (1849)
- Petticoat Government: a Novel (1850)
- Mrs. Matthews, or Family Mysteries: a Novel (1851)
- Second Love, or Beauty and Intellect: a Novel (1851)
- Uncle Walter: a Novel (1852)
- The Young Heiress: a Novel (1853)
- The Life and Adventures of a Clever Woman (1854)
- Gertrude: or Family Pride (1855)
- Fashionable Life: or Paris and London (1856)

== Non-fiction ==
- Domestic Manners of the Americans (1832)
- The Mother's Manual (1833)
- Belgium and Western Germany in 1833 (1834)
- Paris and the Parisians in 1835 (1836)
- Vienna and the Austrians (1838)
- A Visit to Italy (1842)
- Travels and Travelers: A Series of Sketches (1846)

== Modern editions ==
- Domestic Manners of the Americans, Penguin Classics, 1997.
- Hargrave, Alan Sutton Publishing Limited, 1995.
- Jessie Phillips, Nonsuch Classics, 2006.
- Jonathon Jefferson Whitlaw, The Trollope Society, 2020.
- Paris and the Parisians, Alan Sutton Publishing Limited, 1985.
- The Abbess: A Romance, Volume 1, BiblioBazaar, .
- The Abbess: A Romance, Volume 2, General Books, .
- The Abbess: A Romance, Volume 3, General Books, .
- The Old World and The New, Elibron Classics, 2005.
- The Three Cousins, Sutton Publishing Limited, 1997.
- The Vicar of Wrexhill, Alan Sutton Publishing Limited, 1996.
- The Widow Barnaby, Alan Sutton Publishing Limited, 1995.
- Widow Barnaby, Nonsuch Classics, 2007.
- Life and Adventures of Michael Armstrong, Trollope Society, 2021.
