= 1838 in literature =

This article contains information about the literary events and publications of 1838.

== Events ==
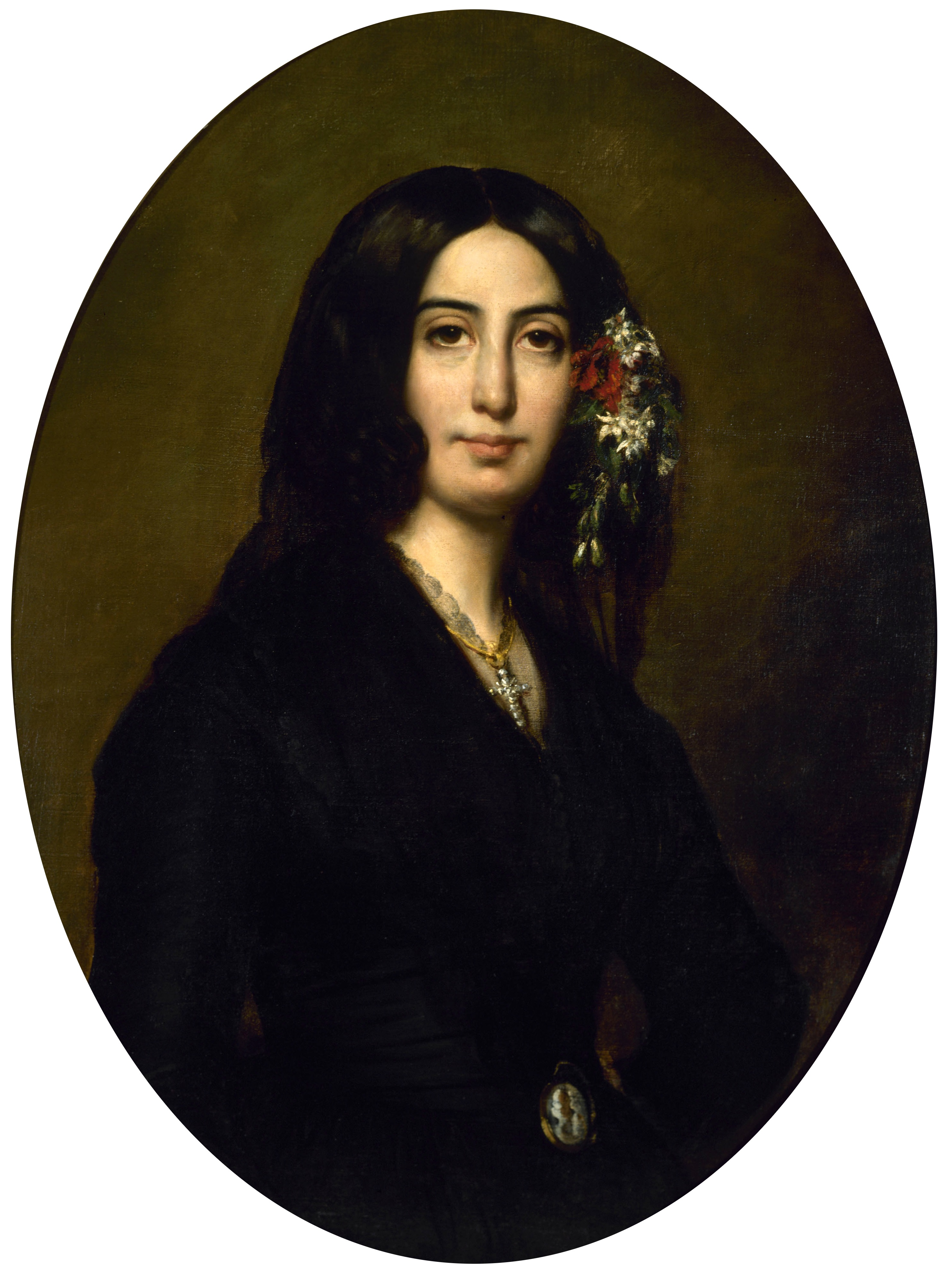
George Sand in 1838

- January 25 – William Macready opens a performance of King Lear at the Theatre Royal, Covent Garden, London, restoring most of William Shakespeare's original text, including the character of the Fool.
- January 28 – The second night of Henrik Wergeland's satirical musical play Campbellerne (The Campbells) in Christiania (Norway) provokes a riot.
- March – The Monthly Chronicle, "a national journal of politics, literature, science, and art", begins publication by Longman in London.
- June 7 – English poet and novelist Letitia Elizabeth Landon marries George Maclean, travelling with him in early August to Cape Coast Castle, Gold Coast, where she dies on October 15 of a spasm arising from a heart defect.
- October 19 – Poet Alfred de Musset is appointed librarian of the Ministry of the Interior in France.
- November 3 – The Times of India is founded as The Bombay Times and Journal of Commerce by Raobahadur Narayan Dinanath Velkar in Bombay.
- November 8 – French novelist George Sand begins an uncomfortable winter living with her lover, the ailing Polish-born composer and pianist Frédéric Chopin, on the Mediterranean island of Mallorca in the abandoned Carthusian monastery of Valldemossa.
- unknown dates
  - Anna Maria Bunn's Gothic fiction The Guardian: a tale ("by an Australian") is published in Sydney. It is the first Australian novel printed and published in mainland Australia (although set in the author's native Ireland) and the first by a woman.
  - George Palmer Putnam and John Wiley form the book publishing and retail firm of Wiley & Putnam in New York City. It is the forerunner of G. P. Putnam's Sons.
  - Lady Charlotte Guest begins publication of her translation into English of the Welsh traditional tales known as the Mabinogion.

== New books ==
=== Fiction ===
- Hendrik Conscience – De Leeuw van Vlaanderen (The Lion of Flanders)
- Charles Dickens
  - Nicholas Nickleby (serialization begins)
  - Oliver Twist (in book form)
- Théophile Gautier – "One of Cleopatra's Nights" (short story)
- William Nugent Glascock – Land Sharks and Sea Gulls
- Edward Howard (as "edited by the author of Peter Simple") – Rattling the Reefer
- Karl Leberecht Immermann – Münchhausen
- John Pendleton Kennedy – Rob of the Bowl
- Edgar Allan Poe
  - The Narrative of Arthur Gordon Pym of Nantucket
  - "Ligeia" (short story)
- George Sand
  - L'Orco
  - L'Uscoque
- Ann Sophia Stephens – Mary Derwent
- Robert Smith Surtees – Jorrocks' Jaunts and Jollities
- Frances Milton Trollope – A Romance of Vienna

=== Children ===
- Hans Christian Andersen – Fairy Tales Told for Children. New Collection. First Booklet (Eventyr, fortalte for Børn. Ny Samling. Første Hefte) comprising "The Daisy" ("Gåseurten"), "The Steadfast Tin Soldier" ("Den standhaftige tinsoldat") and "The Wild Swans" ("De vilde svaner")

=== Drama ===
- Dion Boucicault – A Legend of the Devil's Dyke
- Edward Bulwer – The Lady of Lyons
- Charles Dickens – The Lamplighter: a farce in one act (rejected for performance)
- Franz Grillparzer – Weh dem, der lügt!
- James Haynes – Durazzo
- Victor Hugo – Ruy Blas
- James Sheridan Knowles
  - The Maid of Mariendorpt
  - Woman's Wit
- Martins Pena – O Juiz de Paz na Roça (The Roça Justice of the Peace)
- Thomas Talfourd – The Athenian Captive

=== Poetry ===
- Elizabeth Barrett Browning – The Seraphim and Other Poems
- Eliza Hamilton Dunlop – "The Aboriginal Mother"
- Martin Tupper – Proverbial Philosophy

=== Non-fiction ===
- Lady Charlotte Bury – Diary Illustrative of the Times of George IV
- Giacomo Casanova – Memoirs (final volume)
- Ralph Waldo Emerson – The Divinity School Address
- Anna Brownell Jameson – Winter Studies and Summer Rambles in Canada
- Gideon Mantell – The Wonders of Geology, or, A Familiar Exposition of Geological Phenomena...
- Harriet Martineau – How to Observe Morals and Manners
- Samuel Smiles – Physical Education
- Baron Jules Dupotet de Sennevoy – Introduction to the Study of Animal Magnetism

== Births ==
- January 4 – Eliza Archard Conner, American novelist, journalist, and feminist (died 1912)
- February 6 – Henry Irving, English actor and theatre manager (died 1905)
- February 22 – Margaret Elizabeth Sangster, American author, poet, and editor (died 1912)
- March 6 – Mary Dickens, English memoirist, editor and novelist (died 1896)
- April 25 – Mary Torrans Lathrap, American author and reformer (died 1895)
- April 30 – Abba Goold Woolson, American writer (died 1921)
- June 26 – Bankim Chandra Chattopadhyay, Bengali writer (died 1894)
- July – Emma Pike Ewing, American author and educator (died 1917)
- July 20 – Augustin Daly, American dramatist and theatre manager (died 1899)
- October 2 – Hester A. Benedict, American poet (died 1921)
- October 25 – Annie Hall Cudlip, English novelist, journalist and editor (died 1918)
- November 7 – Auguste Villiers de l'Isle-Adam, French Symbolist writer (died 1889)
- December 22 – Clara Doty Bates, American author (died 1895)
- unknown date
  - Josephine E. Keating, American literary critic, musician and music teacher (died 1908)
  - Martha D. Lincoln, American author and journalist (died 1911)

== Deaths ==
- March 28 – Thomas Morton, English playwright (born 1764)
- April 12 – Johann Adam Möhler, German theologian (born 1796)
- April 18 – Mariana Starke, English playwright and travel writer (born 1761 or 1762)
- July 12 – John Jamieson, Scottish lexicographer (born 1759)
- August 24 – Ferenc Kölcsey, Hungarian poet and critic (born 1790)
- September 9 – Emma Jane Greenland, English painter, writer (born 1760 or 1761)
- October 15 – Letitia Elizabeth Landon, English poet and novelist (born 1802)
- November 10 (October 29 O.S.) – Ivan Kotliarevsky, Ukrainian writer (born 1769)
- December 17 – Józef Zawadzki, Polish publisher (born 1781)
- December 20 – Hégésippe Moreau, French poet (born 1810)
- December 26 – Ann Hatton, English novelist (born 1764)
- unknown date – Amhlaoibh Ó Súilleabháin, Irish writer in Gaelic (born 1780)
