= Grandon =

Grandon may refer to:

== People ==
Surname

- Francis J. Grandon, (1879–1929), American silent film actor and director
- Jeanne-Marie Grandon (1746–1807), French painter

Given name

- Grandon Rhodes (1904–1987), American actor

== Other uses ==
- Grandon, Hadley Green, a listed building in London
- The Grandon Company, an imprint of Donald M. Grant, Publisher
