= Uncle Walter =

Uncle Walter may refer to:

- Uncle Walter (novel), an 1852 novel by Frances Milton Trollope
- "Uncle Walter" (song), a song from Ben Folds Five's 1995 self-titled debut album
- A nickname for broadcast journalist Walter Cronkite
- A Minnesota colloquial phrase for a Walleye
