= Emily Ronalds =

British social reformer (1795–1889)

Emily Ronalds (25 September 1795 – 10 December 1889) was a British social reformer. She supported pioneering cooperative communities, and also had extended theoretical and practical involvement in early childhood education through the formative years of the infant school movement in England.

== Life and family ==
She was born at 11 Canonbury Place, Islington, to Francis Ronalds and Jane née Field, who were Unitarians and well-to-do wholesale cheesemongers in Upper Thames Street, London. Her brothers included the inventor Sir Francis Ronalds, and Alfred Ronalds, who published a classic book on entomology for fly fishing – Emily produced the painted plates for the fourth edition in 1849.

The family later resided in Highbury Terrace; at Kelmscott House in Hammersmith; Queen Square in Bloomsbury; in Croydon; and on Chiswick Lane. Ronalds also travelled extensively. She went to America in 1824 with the social reformers Richard Flower and Robert Owen to visit her brother Hugh, who had helped found the county town of Albion, Illinois. She also spent considerable time in Germany and Switzerland, sometimes in the company of her nephew Edmund Ronalds.

After her mother died in 1852, Ronalds lived at Earlswood Common in Redhill, Surrey, and then at 27 Clifton Terrace in Brighton. At her death, her niece Mrs. Charles Flower recorded that she “leaves a much honoured name behind her”.

== Co-operative communities ==
Ronalds believed that socialist cooperative communities offered promise as a way to alleviate the poverty and suffering then prevalent in Britain and elsewhere. She actively supported cooperative schemes led by Robert Owen and also James Pierrepont Greaves. In 1825 she travelled to New Orleans with the social activist Frances Wright to meet her friend the Marquis de La Fayette and view slavery. Ronalds contributed £300 to establishing Wright's cooperative community called Nashoba in Tennessee with the goal of educating and preparing slaves for freedom.

== Infant education ==
Ronalds established an early infant school with her sister Maria (later Mrs. Samuel Carter) in 1826 near the family home in Croydon. Her initial stimulus was Robert Owen's pioneering infant school at his New Lanark cotton mills, with its emphasis on mutual kindness and affection. She was also influenced by the holistic child-centred philosophy of the educator Johann Heinrich Pestalozzi.

She contributed to the new Infant School Society in London where James Pierrepont Greaves served as secretary. She also advised relatives and associates in her large Unitarian and socialist circles who helped to form infant schools at this time. In addition, she developed close friendships with influential women who had interests in educational reform; these included the philanthropist Lady Byron and the translator Sarah Austin.

In 1840 she visited a school in Dresden opened recently by Adolf Frankenberg, who was a colleague of renowned pedagogue Friedrich Froebel. Froebel had just coined the name kindergarten for his new educational model which highlighted the importance of play in fostering the child's natural development. She began a correspondence with Froebel in which they compared their educational philosophies and in 1841 she met Froebel and spent time at his kindergarten at Bad Blankenburg. He recorded that Ronalds was the first British person to study his approach and he urged her to promote and "transplant" his concepts in England. Ronalds' extensive network of colleagues, friends and relatives facilitated this dissemination and uptake of Froebel's philosophy in Britain, particularly in privately funded schools and in middle-class families.
