= The Barnabys in America =

1843 novel

- 1874 edition
- Author: Frances Milton Trollope
- Language: English
- Genre: Picaresque novel
- Publisher: Henry Colburn
- Publication date: 1843
- Publication place: United Kingdom
- Media type: Print

The Barnabys in America is an 1843 novel by the British writer Frances Trollope. It is the third part in a trilogy of novels that also included The Widow Barnaby (1839) and The Widow Married (1840). It was published in three volumes by the London-based Henry Colburn. It is noted for its observational on the United States in the years before the American Civil War. Trollope had made her name with her 1832 travel book Domestic Manners of the Americans and was noted for her anti-slavery views. She makes reference to this by having her protagonist, Widow Barnaby, plan to write her own travel book based on the United States. The critical tone of American life drew comparisons to the similar depiction in Martin Chuzzlewit by Charles Dickens, published the same year.

== Bibliography ==
- Hollyday, Guy. Anti-Americanism in the German Novel 1841-1862. Lang, 1977.
- Kissel, Susan S. In Common Cause: The "conservative" Frances Trollope and the "radical" Frances Wright. Bowling Green State University Popular Press, 1993.
- Meer, Sarah. American Claimants: The Transatlantic Romance, C.1820-1920. Oxford University Press, 2020.
- Wagner, Tamara. Frances Trollope: Beyond “Domestic Manners”. Routledge, 2013.
