= Portrait of Frances Trollope =

Painting by Auguste Hervieu

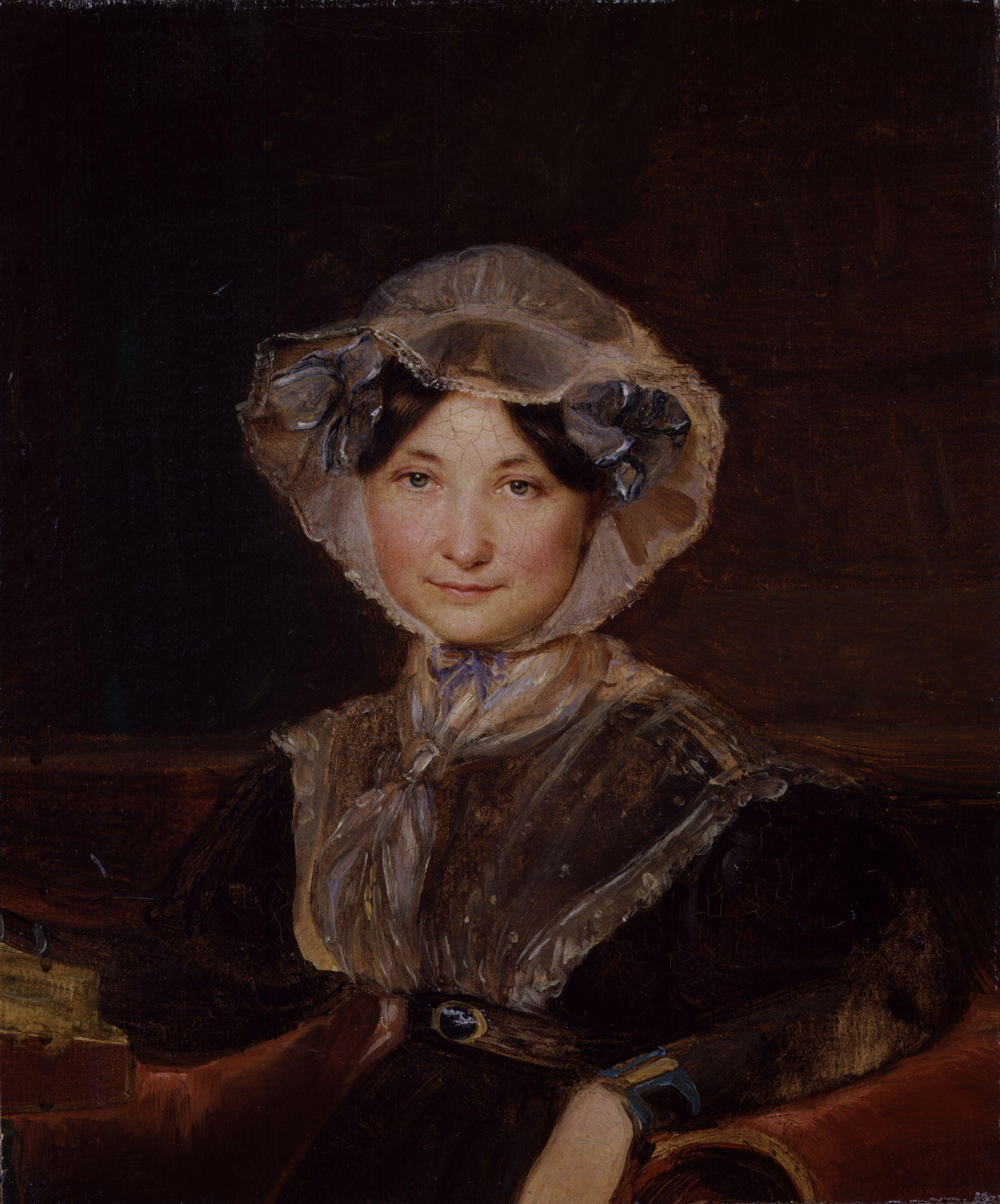
- Artist: Auguste Hervieu
- Year: 1832
- Type: Oil on canvas, portrait
- Dimensions: 15.2 cm × 12.7 cm (6.0 in × 5.0 in)
- Location: National Portrait Gallery, London

Portrait of Frances Trollope is an 1832 portrait painting by the French artist Auguste Hervieu depicting the British writer Frances Milton Trollope, known for her silver fork and social novels. Hervieu illustrated several of her novels and had worked at one time as a tutor to her children including the future author Anthony Trollope. It was produced the same year that her popular travel book Domestic Manners of the Americans was published.

Hervieu displayed a portrait of Trollope at the Royal Academy Exhibition of 1833 at Somerset House, but it is not believed to be the same as it was much larger. A watercolour copy is now in the British Museum. The Hervieu image of Trollope was widely produced in her novels and in prints. Today the painting is in the collection of the National Portrait Gallery in London, having been acquired in 1954.

== Bibliography ==
- Denlinger, Elizabeth & Wagner, Stephen. Before Victoria: Extraordinary Women of the British Romantic Era. Columbia University Press, 2005.
- Heineman, Helen. Mrs. Trollope: The Triumphant Feminine in the Nineteenth Century. Ohio University Press, 1979.
- Terry, R.C. Trollope: Interviews And Recollections. Palgrave Macmillan, 1987.
