= Samuel Freeman (engraver) =

English engraver (1773–1857)

Samuel Freeman (1773–1857) was an English engraver. He died on 27 February 1857, aged 84.

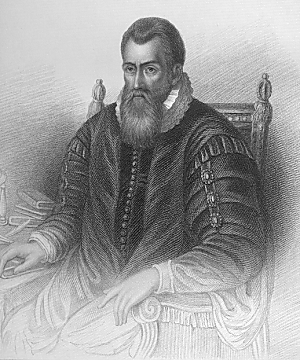
Portrait of John Napier.

== Works ==
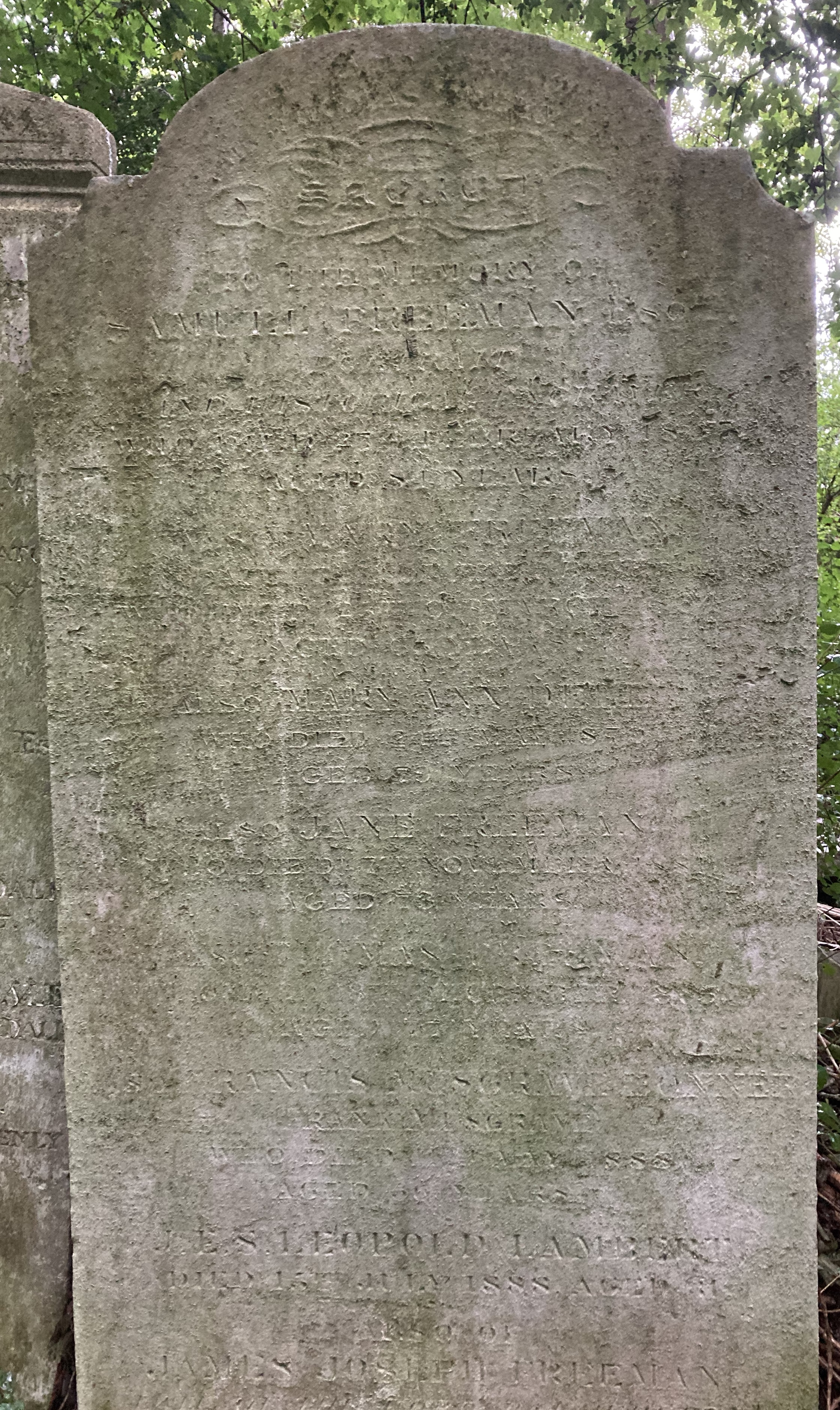
Family grave of Samuel Freeman in Highgate Cemetery

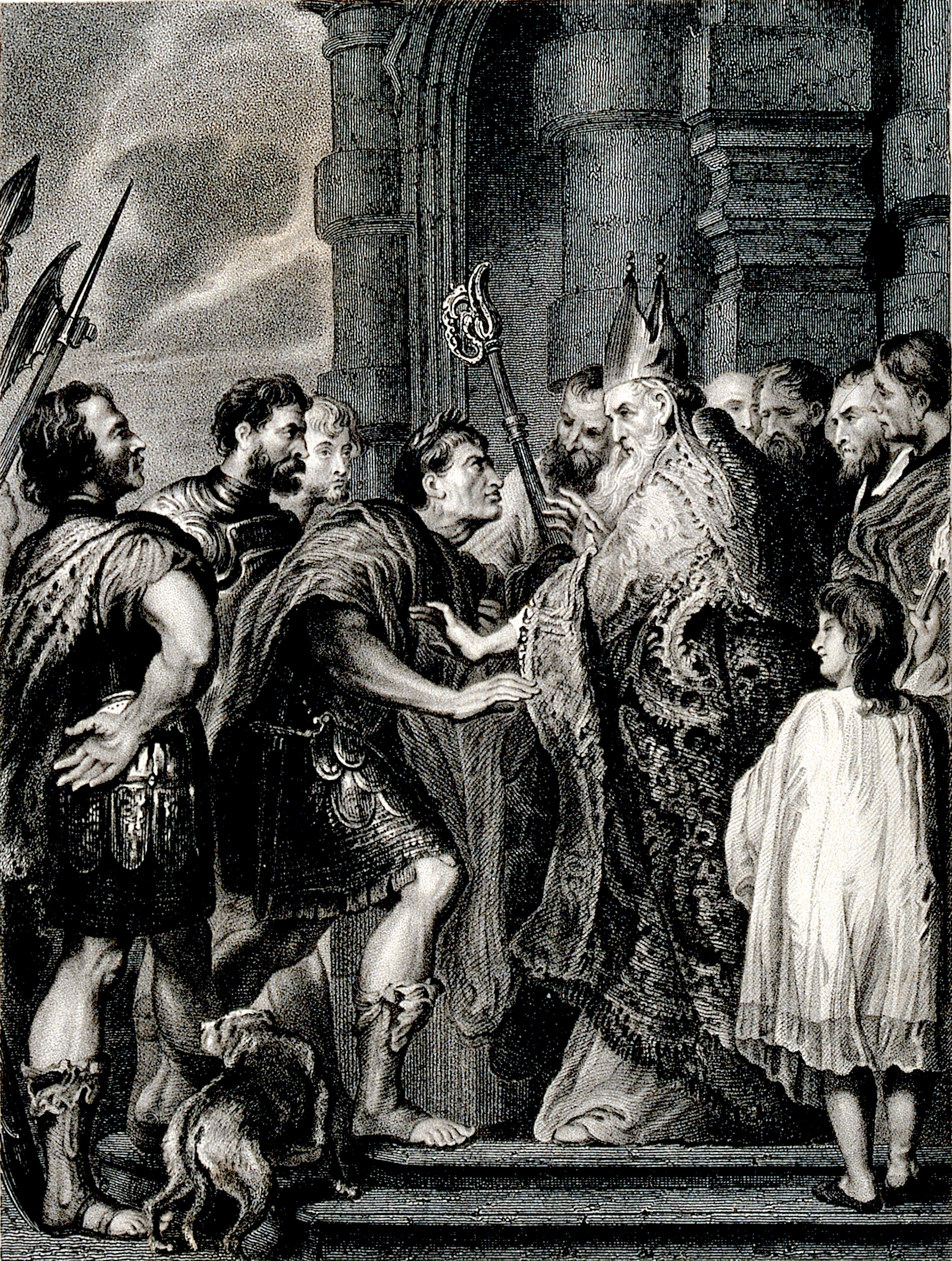
Samuel Freeman after Anthony van Dyck. Saint Ambrose barring Theodosius from Milan Cathedral, 1832

Freeman worked chiefly in stipple, and is principally known as an engraver of portraits. Among these were:

- Samuel Johnson, after Francesco Bartolozzi;
- Garrick, and Henry Tresham, R.A., after Sir Joshua Reynolds;
- Robert Ker Porter, and Letitia Elizabeth Landon, after J. Wright (Freeman's original drawing from the portrait of Miss Landon is in the print room at the British Museum);
- Thomas Campbell, after Lawrence;
- Charles Elmé Francatelli the cook, after Auguste Hervieu
- Queen Victoria, after Miss Costello, and others.

He engraved numerous portraits and other illustrations to Thomas Frognall Dibdin's Northern Gallery etc.

For Tresham's British Gallery (1815) Freeman engraved the Stafford Gallery replica of Raphael's La vierge au diadème. He also engraved some of the plates for Jones's National Gallery, and numerous portraits for Fisher's National Portrait Gallery. For James Dallaway's edition of Horace Walpole's Anecdotes of Painting he engraved The Marriage of Henry VI and Margaret of Anjou from an ancient painting.

He is buried in a family grave (plot no.7930) on the western side of Highgate Cemetery.
