= Course of Popular Lectures =

Book by Frances Wright

Course of Popular Lectures is two published collections of 19th-century lectures given in the United States on religion, church influence in politics, morality, slavery, and sexism. The lectures were written and given in 1828 and 1836 by Frances Wright.

The collection includes two volumes:

- Volume I – With three addresses on various public occasions, and a reply to the charges against the French Reformers of 1789. It includes seven lectures and three addresses. It was published in 1829.
- Volume 2 – Historical and political, being an introductory to a course on the nature and object of America's political institutions. It was published in 1836.

== Overview ==
Wright was born in Scotland in 1795 and became an American citizen in 1825.

Wright delivered her lectures in New York, Boston, Philadelphia, Cincinnati, and several other cities. In the preface, Wright addresses the People of the United States as her audience, giving them permission to "examine ... judge ... adopt ... or to discard the views" set forth in her work.

Wright's objective in these lectures was to "[attempt] reform by means of instructional improvement". She further stated that, "I have ... applied myself to develop what is true [rather] than to expose what is false".

== Volume I ==
Volume I contained the following lectures and addresses:

=== Lectures I–III ===
- On the nature of knowledge
- Of free inquiry, considered as a means of obtaining just knowledge
- Of the more important divisions and essential parts of knowledge

The first three lectures focus on knowledge in the epistemological sense. Wright begins by acknowledging that all men, from savage to statesmen, will practice and preach what they hold to be true without regard for their potential ignorance. In other words, men believe that what they think is true, is indeed true solely based on the fact that they are the ones believing it. Wright cites ignorance being the greatest contributor to this logical fallacy. From here, Wright explains her conception of knowledge by explaining, "[knowledge is] what there is for us to know, the means we possess for acquiring such knowledge as is of possible attainment…and to seek in our knowledge the test of our opinions".

In general, Wright posits that the knowledge we accumulate takes two distinct forms: knowledge that is taught and knowledge that is accumulated through experience. The knowledge that is taught to us is not necessarily known. To her, a more appropriate word for this type of information would be belief. This is in contrast to the form of knowledge that we know from our direct experience. Wright says that this kind of knowledge is more accurate because it comes from our own experience; therefore, it is more familiar to us. Wright summarizes by saying that, "Knowledge signifies things known".

=== Lectures IV–V ===
- Religion
- Morals

In the following two lectures, Wright examines her conception of knowledge in relation to religion and morality. As stated in Lectures I–III, Wright posits that knowledge implies that things are known; therefore, for any subject to have truth, it must be built on empirical foundations. Wright sees religion, as a subject, lacking on these factual foundations.

To provide clarity to her readers, Wright attempts to outline what she deems an appropriate subject, or science, containing truth. In the beginning, Wright acknowledges that there must be facts that are known through our experience and direct observation. With these empirical foundations, Wright explains that we have our premises from which we can build an appropriate science. Without these factual premises, the science would be built on false foundations. Wright compares this to building a castle in the air.

Religion, to Wright, is a science built on false foundations. With much disagreement among people as to the appropriate practices of religion, the falsehood of religion should be evident. If religion were built on empirical foundations, Wright suggests the truth should be evident and there would be no disagreements therefore. Furthermore, Wright explains that the mere fact that the knowledge gained through religion is primarily belief, as opposed to experiential knowledge, exposes religion's falsehood.

=== Lectures VI–VII ===
- Opinions
- On existing evils and their remedy

Wright begins the last two lectures by critiquing the role that opinions have played in our history. She begins by suggesting that an appropriate and mature understanding of opinions could have prevented many of the problems that were being faced during her time. Again, Wright cites ignorance as the greatest contributor to error.

Anger, Wright suggests, is an unwarranted, but often felt emotion in response to differing opinions. To solve this problem, Wright explains that an individual receiving the opinion must simply inquire as to what facts the opinion was derived. From there, the individual can determine whether the opinion is true or false. Neither of these results should spur hostility or anger. From this position, Wright continues on to explain how the existing evils, such as slavery and sexism, had come into existence. She explains these grievances in relation to her conception on knowledge as well as her position on opinions.

=== Addresses ===
- Address I. – delivered in the New Harmony Hall, on the Fourth of July, 1828
- Address II. – delivered in the Walnut-street Theatre, Philadelphia, on the Fourth of July, 1829
- Address III. – delivered at the opening of the Hall of Science, New-York, Sunday, April 26, 1829,

The book concludes with a Reply to the traducers of the French Reformers of the year 1789.

== Volume II ==
- Preface
- Appendix to the Preface
- Lecture I: Geographical, Political, and Historical Sketch of the American United States. [As first delivered, on Sunday, the 15th May, 1836, in the Court-House of Cincinnati, State of Ohio, and then in the City of Philadelphia.]
- Lecture II: Origin and History of the Federal Party; With a General View of the Hamilton Financial Scheme. [As first delivered in Lancaster County, Penn., on Sunday, 21 August 1836, and afterwards in Philadelphia.]
- Lecture III: On the Sectional Question - Southern Slavery. [First delivered in Cincinnati, on Sunday, May 22d, 1836.]
