= Nashoba Community =

Utopian community to prepare slaves for emancipation

Coordinates: 35.1465°N 89.8449°W

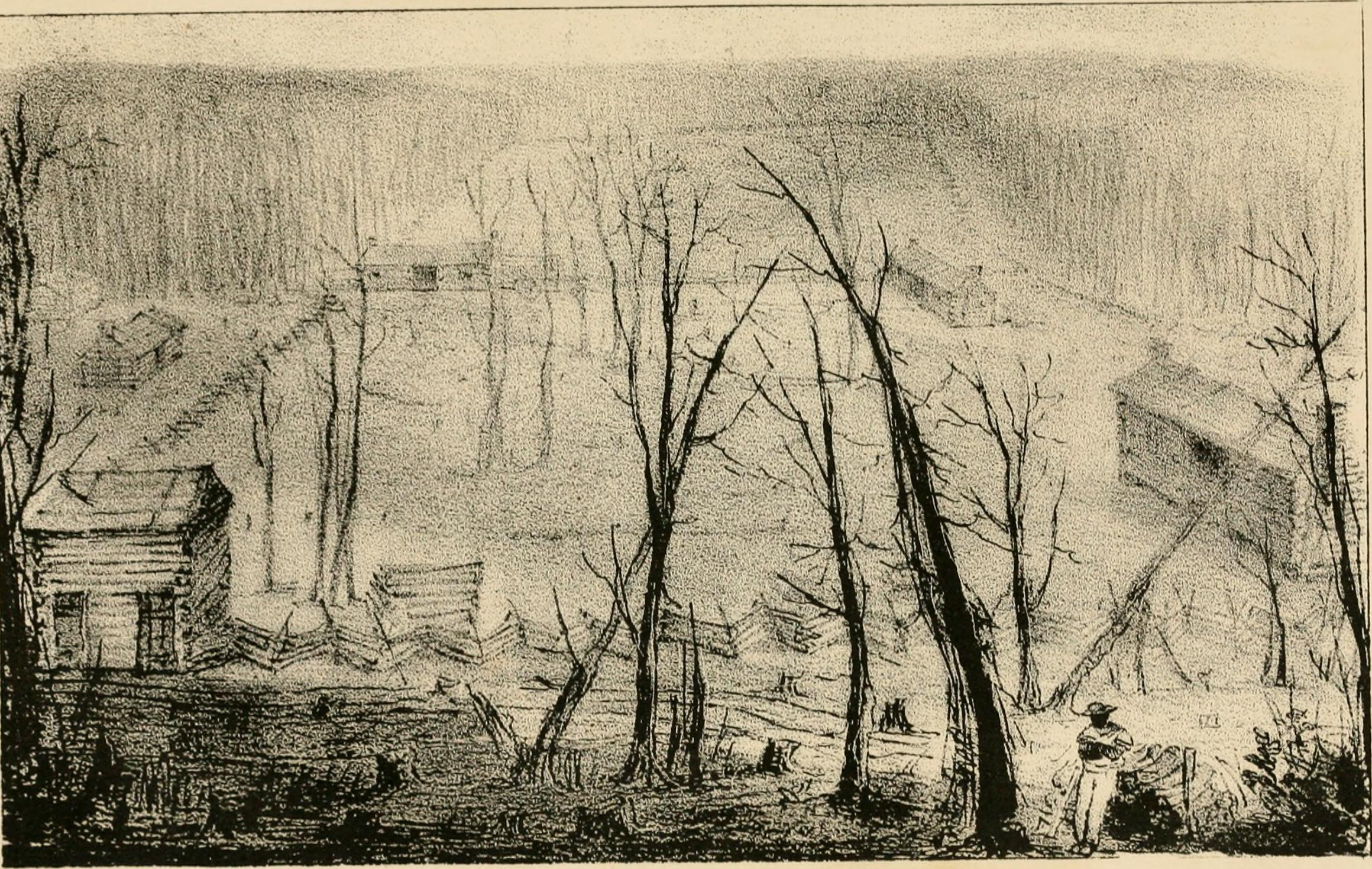
Sketch of Nashoba, from Domestic Manners of the Americans, 1832

The Nashoba Community was an experimental project of Frances "Fanny" Wright, initiated in 1825 to educate and emancipate slaves. It was located in a 2,000-acre (8 km^{2}) woodland on the side of present-day Germantown, Tennessee, a Memphis suburb, along the Wolf River. It was a small-scale test of her full-compensation emancipation plan in which no slaveholders would lose money for emancipating slaves. Instead, Wright proposed that, through a system of unified labor, the slaves would buy their freedom and then be transported to Haiti or to the settlements that became Liberia.

== Purpose ==
The commune was to create a demonstration of Wright's emancipation plan: to create a place to educate slaves and prepare them for freedom and colonization in Haiti or Liberia. Wright was strongly influenced by Robert Owen and his utopian community, New Harmony, Indiana. Surviving for three years, Nashoba outlasted New Harmony.

Wright first expressed her plan of emancipation in an article called "A Plan for the Gradual Abolition of Slavery in the United States, without Danger of Loss to the Citizens of the South," which she published in the New Harmony Gazette in October 1825. Wright believed that if she could arrange emancipation without financial loss to slaveholders, planters of the South would use it. She believed that slaveholders were "anxious to manumit their people, but apprehensive about throwing them unprepared into the world." Wright imagined that if her experimental community was successful, its methods could be applied throughout the nation.

Wright raised funds and recruited people. Among the first were the Englishman George Flower and his family, who had founded another settlement in Albion, Illinois. The social reformer Emily Ronalds contributed £300 to the scheme. Wright could not raise sufficient monetary support however and ended up using a good portion of her own fortune to buy land and slaves. She called it "Nashoba," the Chickasaw word for "wolf."

Nashoba is remembered as an egalitarian, interracial community, but it did not reach these goals. While Wright was a champion of emancipation, the slaves in the community were her property until they could buy themselves out. In "Revisiting Nashoba," Gail Bederman says, "Nashoba's continued commitment to colonization and fully compensated emancipation meant that its slaves remained both subordinates and, most fundamentally, property."

When the compensated emancipation plan failed to produce results, Wright turned Nashoba into a kind of utopian community. The white members of the community became the trustees and were responsible for administering the property and making the decisions. The slaves could never become trustees.

Wright left Nashoba in 1827 for Europe to recover from malaria. During her absence, the trustees managed the community, but by Wright's return in 1828, Nashoba had collapsed. At its largest, Nashoba had only 20 members.

Nashoba is described briefly in Frances Trollope's 1832 book Domestic Manners of the Americans. She visited Nashoba with Wright in 1827 and lived in the United States for a few years. Her work was critical of American society for its lack of polish. She thought residents at Nashoba lacked both sufficient provisions and luxuries.

== Demise ==
The interim managers of Nashoba instigated the concept of free love within the commune. In practice, it was interracial, but far from egalitarian. As rumors spread of inter-racial marriage, the Commune encountered increasing financial difficulty, eventually leading to its collapse in 1828.

Before Nashoba failed, Wright was returning by ship to America. On her journey, she wrote "Explanatory Notes Respecting the Nature and Objects of the Institution of Nashoba, and of the Principles upon which it is Founded." She elaborated on a notion of Nashoba as an interracial and egalitarian utopia. Her plan outlined in "Explanatory Notes" was never put into effect, however; Nashoba had already failed when Wright arrived back in the US. Wright personally chartered a ship and delivered the remaining slaves of Nashoba to Haiti, where she emancipated them.

== Legacy ==
Despite the failure of Nashoba, it provided an example of working utopian theory. Wright had progressive ideas of liberty and equality for her time, but the burden of leadership and financial hardship proved too much for the community.

In 1963 Edd Winfield Parks published Nashoba, described as "a novel about Fanny Wright's gallant utopian experiment to emancipate the slaves".

The Twin Oaks Community, founded in 1967, is an intentional community of 100 members in Virginia. All the buildings are named after former communities, and one residence has been named for Nashoba.

Additionally, the Neshoba Unitarian Universalist Church, founded in 1992 in the area where the commune was located, is named after Nashoba.

The name Nashoba (sometimes spelled "Neshoba"), the Chickasaw name for the nearby Wolf River, is still used in the Germantown area for place names, such as Neshoba Road running between Kirby Parkway and Kimbrough Road. It was also briefly the name of Germantown during World War I as a sign of "protest" against the country of Germany.

== See also ==
- List of Owenite communities in the United States
- List of utopian communities in the United States
- New Harmony, Indiana
- Robert Owen
- Shelby Farms
