= The Vicar of Wrexhill =

1837 novel

- Author: Frances Milton Trollope
- Language: English
- Genre: Silver Fork
- Publisher: Richard Bentley
- Publication date: 1837
- Publication place: United Kingdom
- Media type: Print

The Vicar of Wrexhill is an 1837 novel by the British writer Frances Milton Trollope, originally published in three volumes. The High Church Anglican Trollope was heavily critical of the Evangelical movement. The novel has been described as a "scurrilous" critique of Low church Evangelical Anglicanism, often referred to in the novel as Calvinist Doctrine. It is Frances Milton Trollope's best remembered novel, with the protagonist resembling Mr Slope in her son Anthony Trollope's Barchester Towers.

== Synopsis ==
A shady young evangelical clergyman wins the affection of a wealthy young widow, to the concern of her sister and other relatives.

== Bibliography ==
- Rosman, Doreen. Evangelicals and Culture: Second Edition. Wipf and Stock Publishers, 2011.
- Thorne-Murphy, Leslee. Bazaar Literature: Charity, Advocacy, and Parody in Victorian Social Reform Fiction. Oxford University Press, 2023.
- Wagner, Tamara. Frances Trollope: Beyond “Domestic Manners”. Routledge, 2013.
