= Grandon, Hadley Green =

Coordinates: 51°39′41″N 0°11′47″W

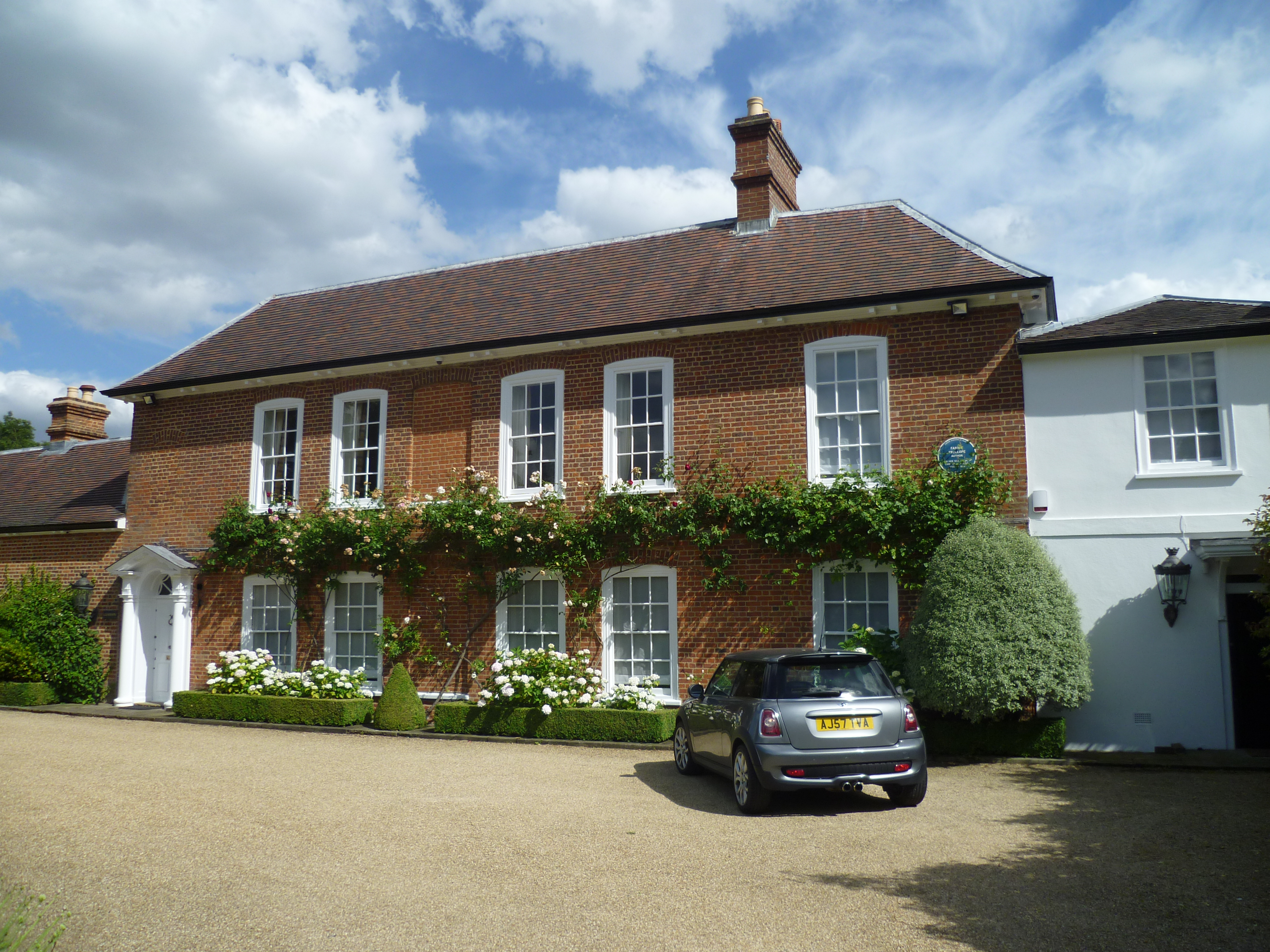
Grandon

Grandon is a grade II listed building on Hadley Green Road, in Monken Hadley, north of Chipping Barnet. The house faces Hadley Green and was once the home of the writers Fanny Trollope and her son Anthony Trollope.
