= Auguste Hervieu =

French painter and book illustrator

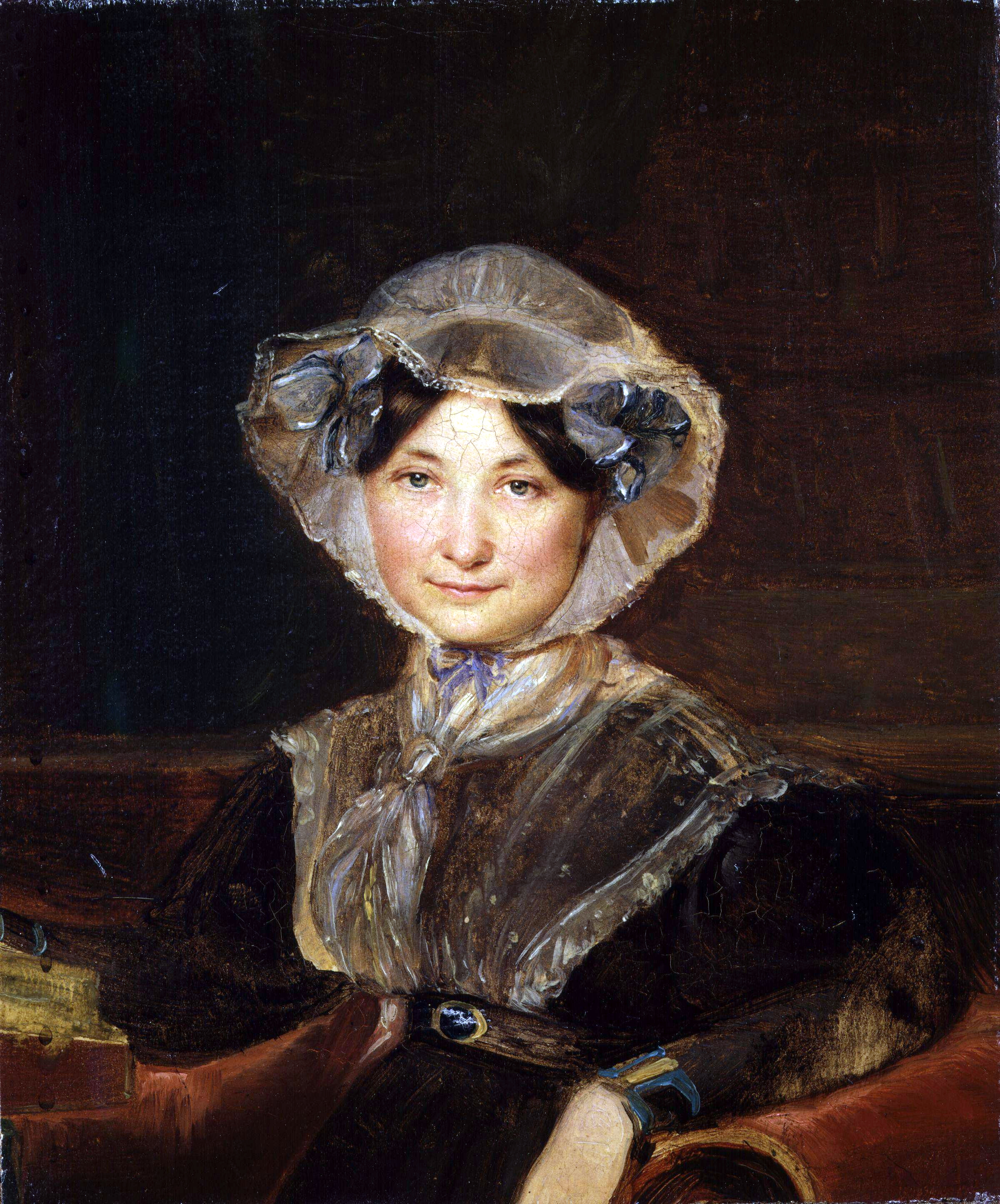
Portrait of Frances Trollope by Hervieu, c. 1832

Auguste Jean Jacques Hervieu (born c.1794; active 1819–1858) was a French painter and book illustrator, working in London.

== Life ==
Hervieu was born near Paris in about 1794 into a French family. His father was a colonel in the army of Napoleon. He studied at military school until his father's death, when he went to study art under Anne-Louis Girodet de Roussy-Trioson. He was exiled from France in 1823 for his anti-royalist politics in the time of Louis XVIII, and he moved to England. He worked in London as a painter and illustrator. As a young man trying to make his living, he travelled to America in November 1827 with the writer Frances Trollope as her children's tutor: one of the children was the novelist Anthony Trollope. He made the illustrations for Frances Trollope's 1840 book A Summer in Brittany, The Broad Arrow by Oliné Keese (1859) and others. He was married in London in 1844.

In 1858 Hervieu exhibited at the Royal Academy. Surviving portraits include Frances Trollope, and probably Anthony or Henry Trollope as a child; the engineer James Watt; and the society cook Charles Elmé Francatelli.

== Museums and galleries ==
- National Portrait Gallery, London (9 portraits)
- Redwood Library and Athenaeum (1 portrait)
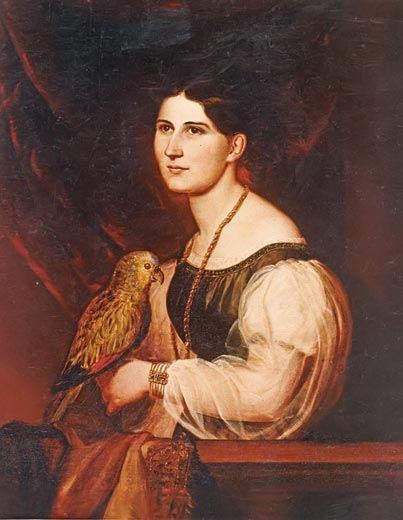
Oil painting of Mary Custis Lee, 1830

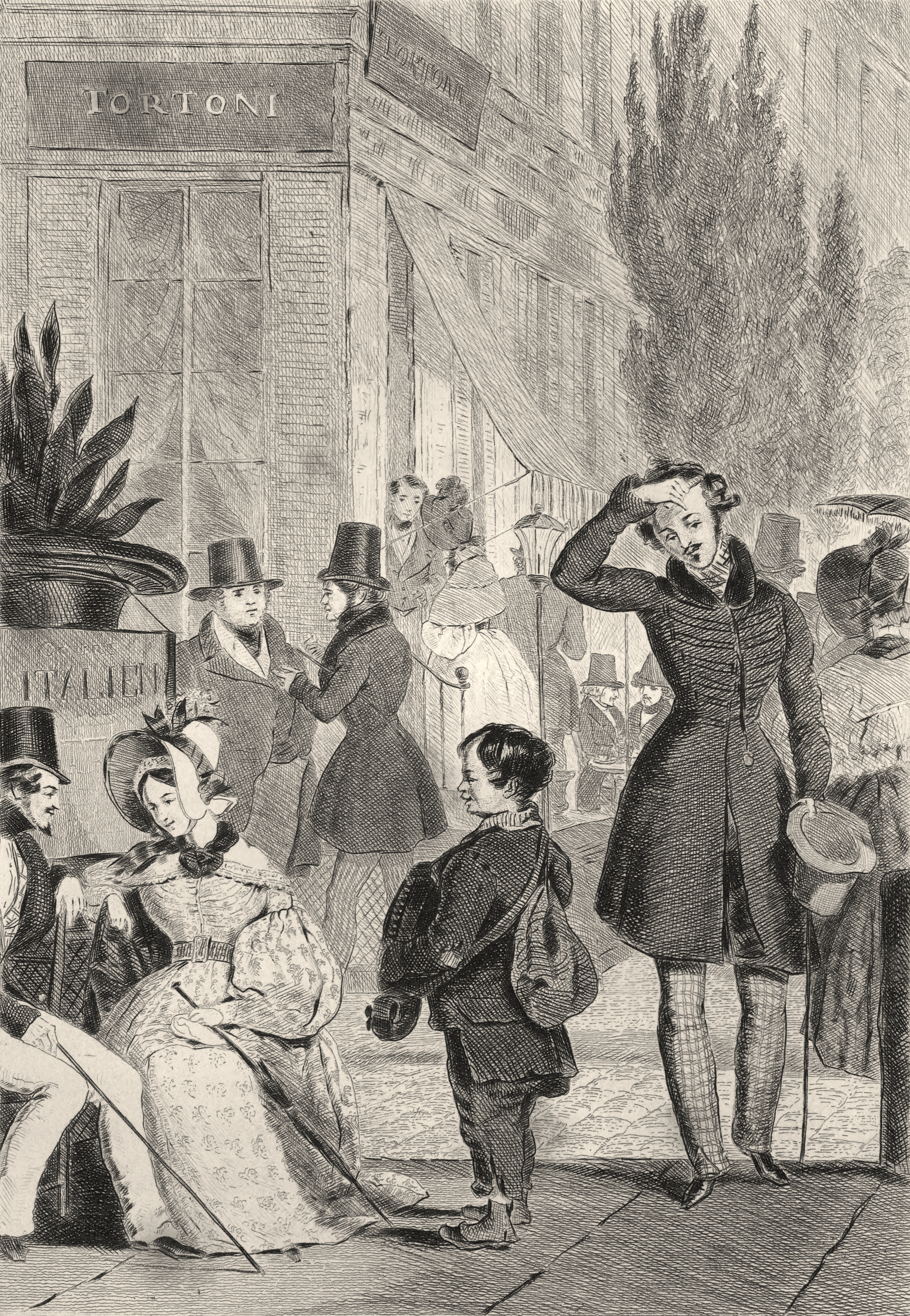
Engraving Boulevard des Italiens (Paris), 1835

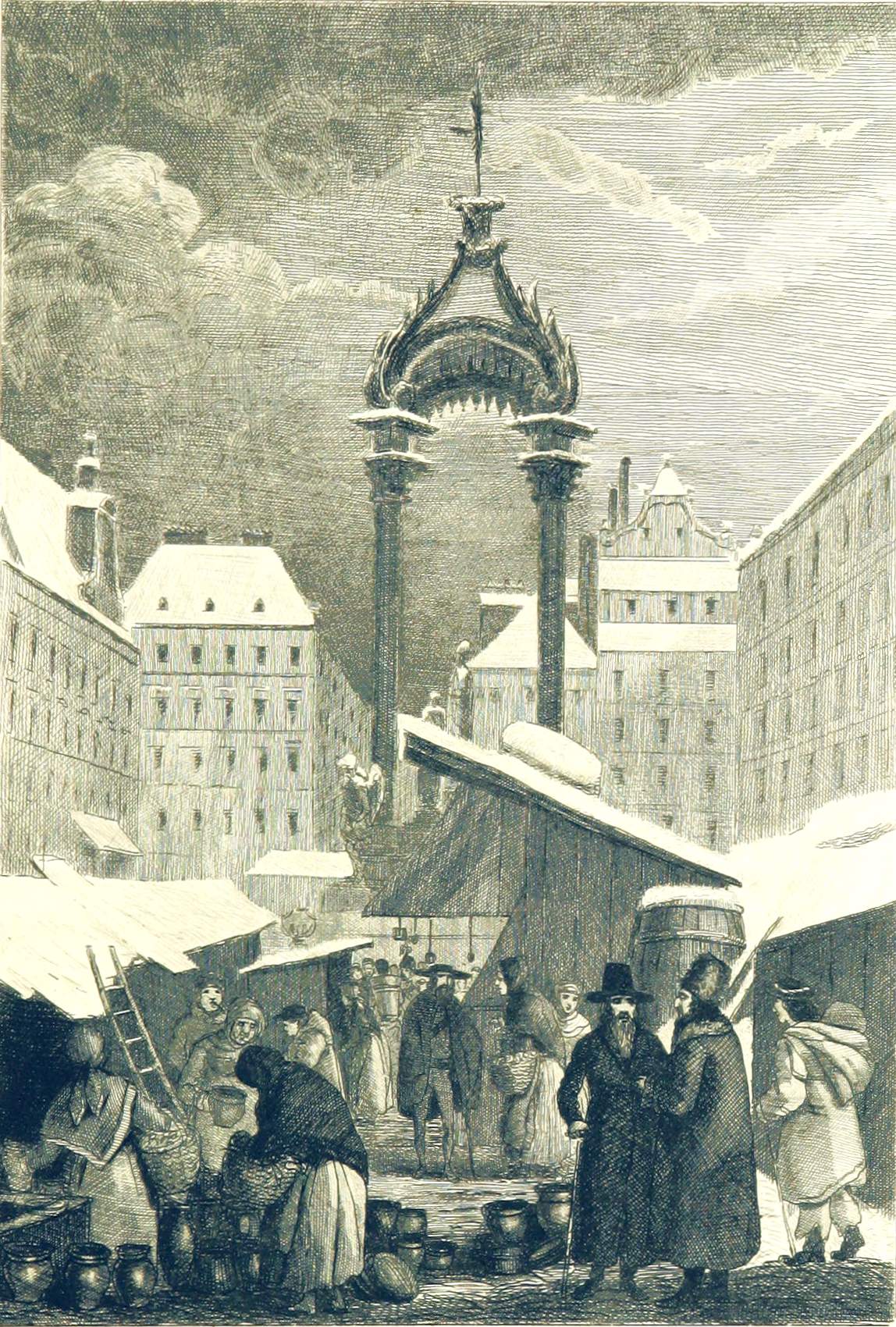
November Fair in the Hoher Markt, 1838, drawn and engraved by Hervieu

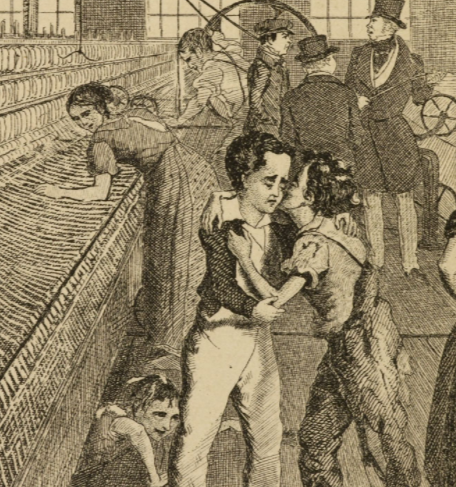
Michael Armstrong, the Factory Boy, 1840

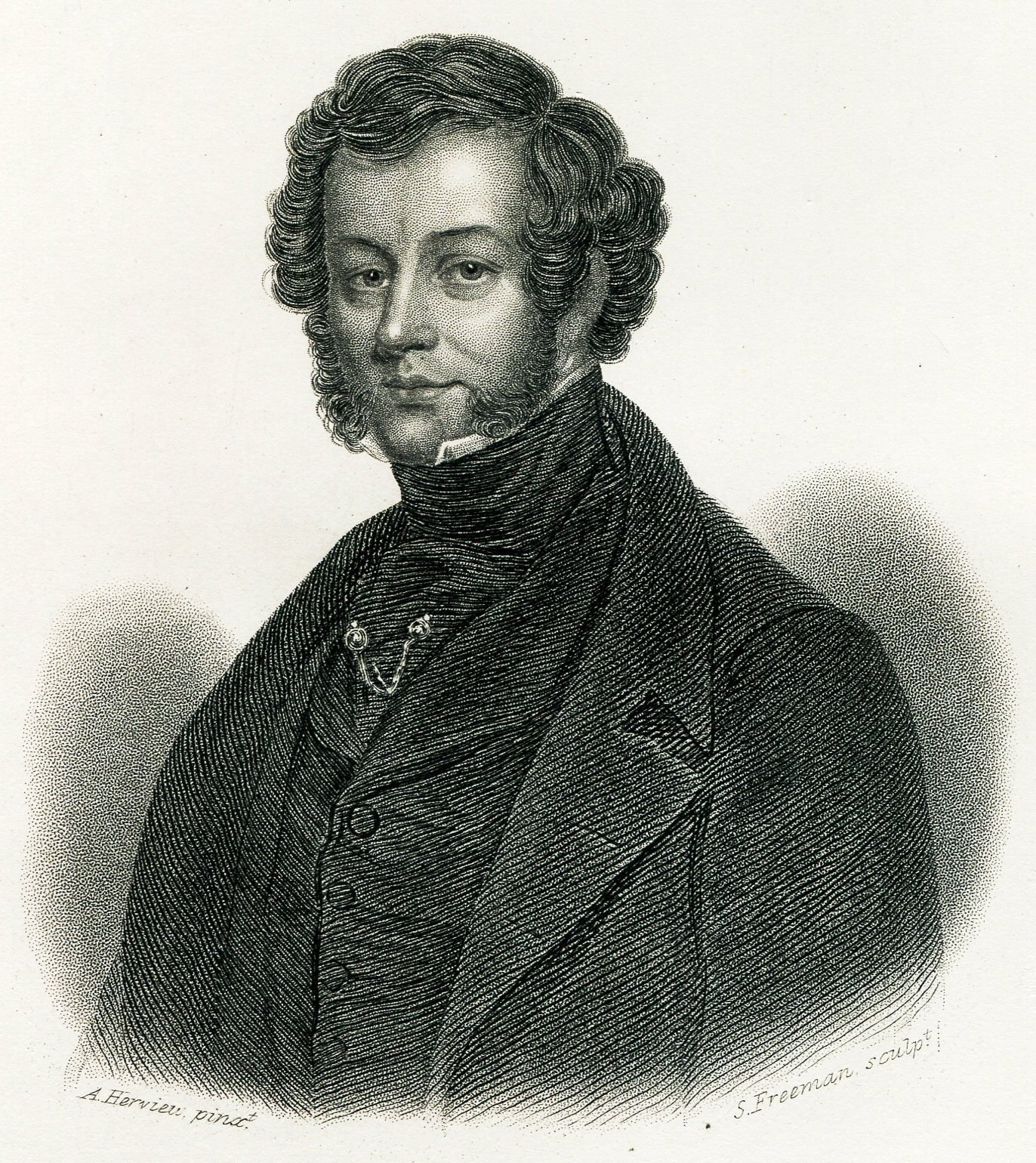
Stipple engraving by Samuel Freeman after Hervieu of Charles Elmé Francatelli, probably in 1846, serving as the Frontispiece to Francatelli's The Modern Cook
