= Josephine E. Keating =

American literary critic, musician and music teacher

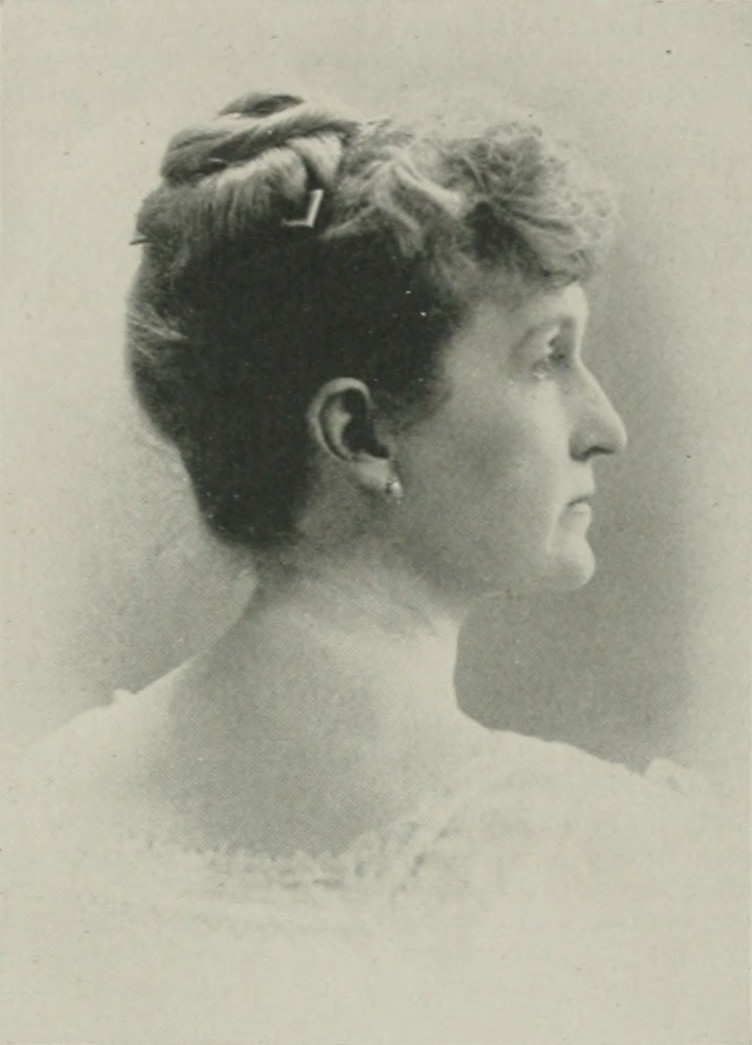
- Photo in A Woman of the Century
- Born: Josephine Esselman Smith; 1838; Nashville, Tennessee, U.S.
- Died: November 8, 1908; Memphis, Tennessee, U.S.
- Occupation: literary critic, musician, music teacher
- Language: English
- Subject: music
- Spouse: John McLeod Keating (m. 1856; died 1906)

Josephine E. Keating (née, Smith; 1838 – November 8, 1908) was an American literary critic, musician and music teacher of the long nineteenth century. Early in her career, she was successful in the music field where she sang for charitable and patriotic purposes and taught music, vocal, piano, harp and guitar. Later, she turned to literature, becoming a discerning and discriminating critic.

== Early life and education ==
Josephine Esselman Smith was born in Nashville, Tennessee, in 1838. She was educated in the Atheneum in Columbia. From that institution, she was graduated with distinction in vocal and instrumental music. She was first in all her other classes, also studying modern French and English literature.

== Career ==
At the beginning of her career, she gave much attention to music and its history and to that of the persons most distinguished as executants or professors of it.{ Keating was also a singer. After many triumphs in the music field in Nashville, Tennessee, Baton Rouge, Louisiana, and Memphis, where she sang for charitable and patriotic purposes, teaching music, vocal, piano, harp and guitar, for the support of her family during the war, she turned to literature.

She became well known to publishers and literary people throughout the country as a discerning and discriminating critic, serving as the literary editor of the Memphis, Tennessee Appeal, and later of the Memphis Commercial. Keating was a letter writer, and for eight years, the New York correspondent of the Appeal. During her connection with that journal, she wrote many musical criticisms of value and several sketches of notable musical and theatrical people. She also made many valuable translations from the French, which were well received.

== Personal life ==
In 1856, she married Col. John McLeod Keating (1830–1906), a Memphis journalist. There were two children, a son and a daughter. She died November 8, 1908, in Memphis, Tennessee.
