= Frances Milton Trollope =

English novelist (1779–1863)

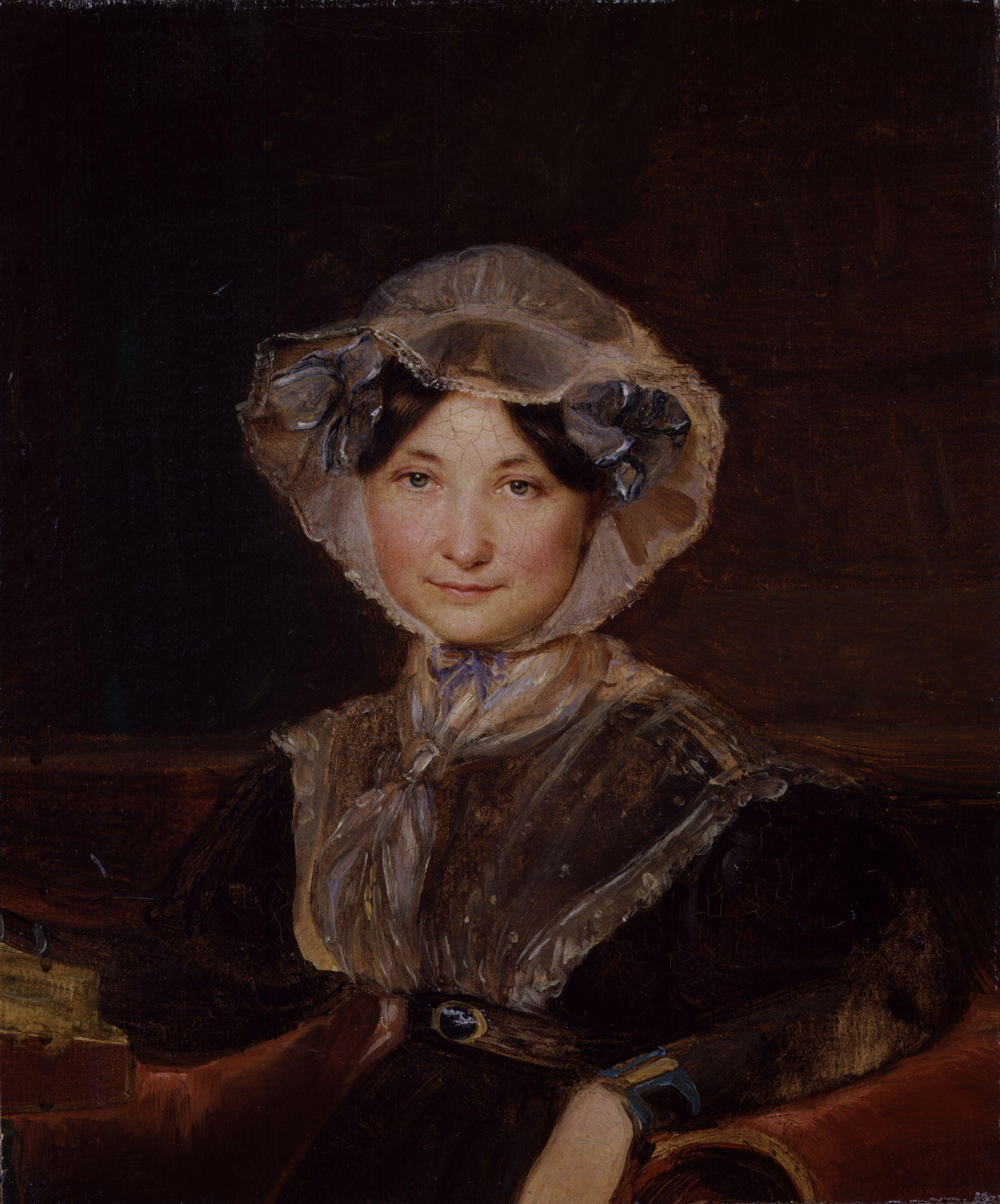
- Portrait of Frances Trollope by Auguste Hervieu, c. 1832
- Born: Frances Milton; 10 March 1779; Bristol, England
- Died: 6 October 1863 (aged 84); Florence, Italy
- Other name: Fanny Trollope
- Occupation: Novelist
- Notable work: Domestic Manners of the Americans
- Spouse: Thomas Anthony Trollope (m. 1809; died 1835)
- Children: 7; including Thomas, Anthony and Cecilia
- Parent(s): William Milton; Mary Gresley

Frances Milton Trollope, also known as Fanny Trollope (10 March 1779 – 6 October 1863), was an English novelist who wrote as Mrs. Trollope or Mrs. Frances Trollope. Her book, Domestic Manners of the Americans (1832), observations from a trip to the United States, is the best known.

She also wrote social novels: one against slavery is said to have influenced Harriet Beecher Stowe, and she also wrote the first industrial novel, and two anti-Catholic novels, which used a Protestant position to examine self-making.

Some recent scholars note that modernist critics have omitted women writers such as Frances Trollope. In 1839, The New Monthly Magazine claimed, "No other author of the present day has been at once so read, so much admired, and so much abused".

Two of her sons, Thomas Adolphus and Anthony, became writers, as did her daughter-in-law Frances Eleanor Trollope (née Ternan), second wife of Thomas Adolphus Trollope.

== Biography ==
Born at Stapleton, Bristol, Frances was the third daughter and middle child of the Reverend William Milton and Mary Milton (née Gresley). She was baptised at St Michael's, Bristol, on 17 March 1779. Frances was five years old when her mother died in childbirth. As a child, Frances read a great amount of English, French and Italian literature.

In 1800, her father married Sarah Partington of Clifton. Frances and her sister moved to Bloomsbury, London, in 1803 to live with their brother, Henry Milton, who was employed in the War Office.

=== Marriage and family ===
In London, she met Thomas Anthony Trollope, a barrister. At the age of 30, she married him on 23 May 1809 in Heckfield, Hampshire. They had four sons and three daughters: Thomas Adolphus, Henry, Arthur (who died in 1824), Emily (who died in a day), Anthony, Cecilia, and Emily. When the Trollopes moved to a leased farm at Harrow-on-the-Hill in 1817, they faced financial struggles for lack of agricultural expertise. This was where Frances gave birth to her last two children. Two of her sons and one daughter also became writers. Her eldest surviving son, Thomas Adolphus Trollope, wrote mostly histories: The Girlhood of Catherine de Medici, History of Florence, What I Remember, Life of Pius IX, and some novels. Her fourth son Anthony Trollope became a successful and prolific novelist, and established a strong reputation, especially for his serial novels, such as those set in the fictional county of Barsetshire, and his political series, the Palliser novels. Cecilia Trollope Tilley published a novel in 1846.

Despite producing six living children, the Trollopes' marriage was reputedly unhappy.

=== Move to America ===
Soon after the move to the leased farm, her marital and financial strains led Frances to seek companionship and aid from Fanny Wright, ward of the French hero Gilbert du Motier, Marquis de Lafayette. In 1824 she visited La Grange, Lafayette's estate in France. Over the next three years, she made several other visits to France and was inspired to take an American excursion with Wright. Frances thought of America as a simple economic venture and figured that she could save money by sending her children through Wright's communal school, as Wright had planned to reform the education of African American children and the formerly enslaved on their property in Tennessee. In November 1827, Frances Trollope went with some of her family to Fanny Wright's utopian community Nashoba Commune in the United States. She took her son, Henry, and her two daughters, Charlotte and Emily. Her husband, Thomas Anthony, and remaining sons, Tom and Anthony, stayed at home and continued their education. In October 1828, Tom and his father joined Frances in Cincinnati, leaving Anthony at boarding school. They returned to England in January 1829.

Arriving in the United States one year earlier than her husband, she developed an intimate relationship with Auguste Hervieu, a collaborator in her venture. (This is not verified.) After the community failed, Trollope moved to Cincinnati, Ohio with her family. She also encouraged the sculptor Hiram Powers to do Dante Alighieri's Commedia in waxworks.

Nonetheless, all the ways she tried to support herself in America were unsuccessful. She found the cultural climate uninteresting and came to resent democracy. Furthermore, after her venture failed, her family was more in debt than when she had migrated there and they were forced to move back to England in 1831.

=== Return to Europe ===
From her return at the age of 50 until her death, Trollope's need of an income for her family and to escape her debts led her to begin writing novels, memoirs of her travels, and other shorter pieces, while travelling around Europe. She became well acquainted with elites and figures of Victorian literature including Elizabeth Barrett, Robert Browning, Charles Dickens, Joseph Henry Green and R. W. Thackeray (a relative of William Makepeace Thackeray). In Paris she was introduced to King Louis Phillipe, who had read Domestic Manners of the Americans, and spent time with the Metternichs in Vienna.

She wrote more than 41 books: six travelogues, 35 novels, countless controversial articles, and poems. In 1843, Frances visited Italy and eventually moved to Florence permanently.

== Writing career ==
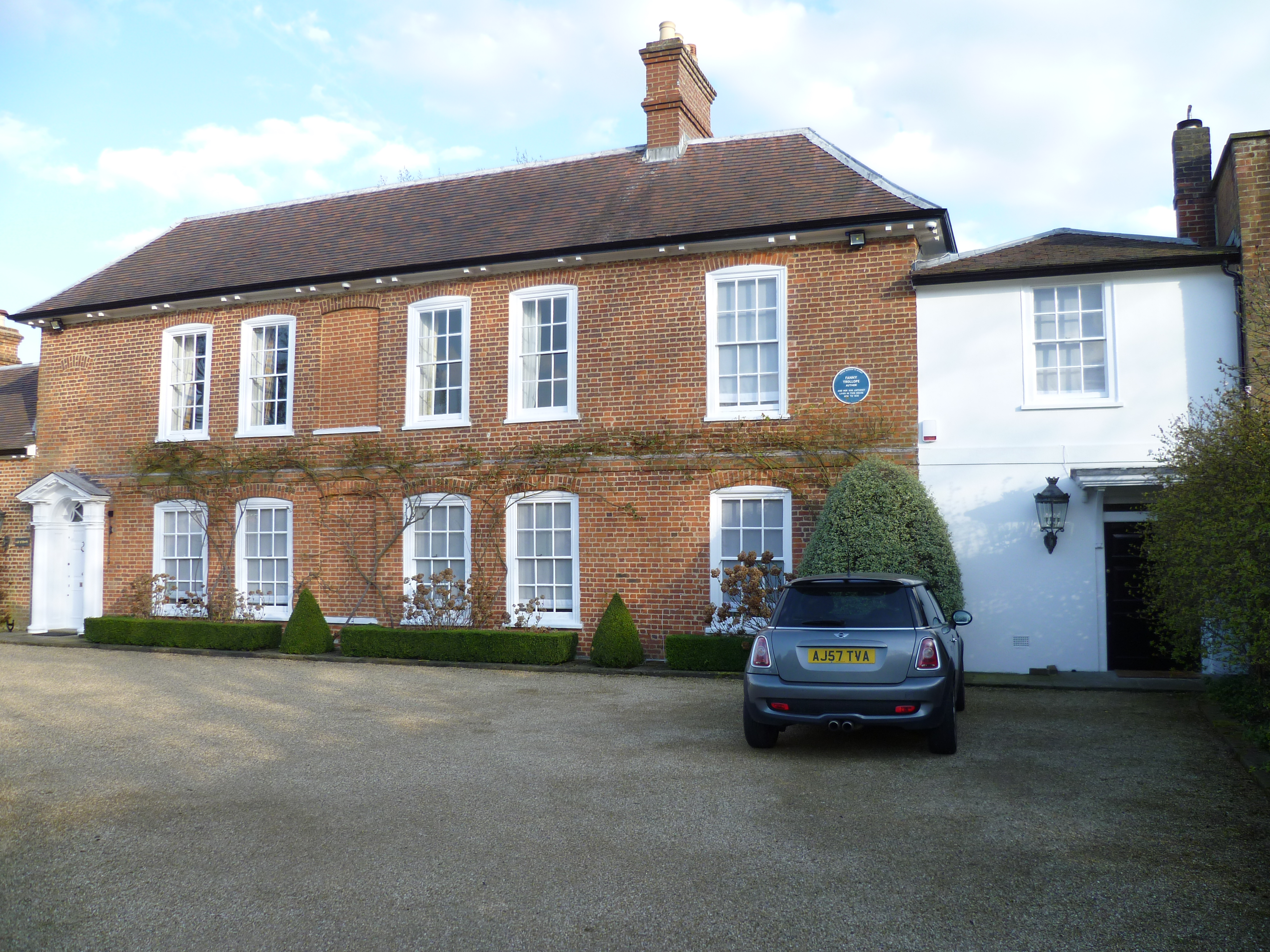
Grandon, Monken Hadley. Home to Fanny Trollope in 1836–1838.

Trollope already gained notice with her first book Domestic Manners of the Americans (1832). She gave an unfavourable, and in the opinions of America's partisans, an exaggerated account. Her novel, The Refugee in America (1832), expressed similar views, prompting Catharine Sedgwick to respond that "Mrs. Trollope, though she has told some disagreeable truths, has for the most part caricatured till the resemblance is lost." She was thought to reflect the disparaging views of American society that were allegedly commonplace at that time among English people of the higher social classes.

Later Trollope wrote further travel works, such as Belgium and Western Germany in 1833 (1834), Paris and the Parisians in 1835 (1836), and Vienna and the Austrians (1838). Among those with whom she became acquainted in Brussels was the future novelist Anna Harriett Drury.

=== Novels ===
Next came The Abbess (1833), an anti-Catholic novel, as was Father Eustace (1847). While both borrowed from Victorian Gothic conventions, the scholar Susan Griffin notes that Trollope wrote a Protestant critique of Catholicism that also expressed "a gendered set of possibilities for self-making", which has been little recognised by scholars. She noted that "Modernism's lingering legacy in criticism meant overlooking a woman's nineteenth century studies of religious controversy."

Trollope received more attention in her lifetime for what are considered several strong novels of social protest: Jonathan Jefferson Whitlaw (1836) was the first anti-slavery novel, influencing the American Harriet Beecher Stowe's Uncle Tom's Cabin (1852). It focuses on two powerful families – one that strongly encourages slavery and another that strongly opposes it and provides sanctuary for slave refugees. It antagonizes pro-slavery characters, making them appear foolish and uncultured. Frances also brings out her idea of a stereotypical American by drawing certain characters as shrewd, convincing, sly and greedy.

Published in 1840, Michael Armstrong, the Factory Boy was the first industrial novel to be published in Britain, inspired by Frances's visit to Manchester in 1832, where she examined the conditions of children employed in the textile mills. The story of a factory boy who is rescued by a wealthy benefactor at first, but later returns to the mills, illustrates the misery of factory life and suggests that private philanthropy alone will not solve the widespread misery of factory employment. Other socially conscious novels of hers include The Vicar of Wrexhill (1837, Richard Bentley, London, 3 volumes), which took on the issue of corruption in the Church of England and evangelical circles. Possibly her greatest work is the Widow Barnaby trilogy (1839–1843), which includes the first ever sequel. In particular, Michael Sadleir considers the skilful set-up of Petticoat Government [1850], with its cathedral city, clerical psychology and domineering female, as something of a formative influence on her son's elaborate and colourful cast of characters in Barchester Towers, notably Mrs. Proudie.

== Later life and death ==
In later years Frances Trollope continued to write novels and books on miscellaneous subjects – in all over 100 volumes. In her own time, she was considered to have acute powers of observation and a sharp and caustic wit, but her prolific production coupled with the rise of modernist criticism caused her works to be overlooked in the 20th century. Few of her books are now read, but her first and two others are available on Project Gutenberg.

After the death of her husband and daughter, in 1835 and 1838 respectively, Trollope moved to Florence, Italy, having lived, briefly, at Carleton, Eden in Cumbria, but finding that (in her son Tom's words) "the sun yoked his horses too far from Penrith town." One year, she invited Theodosia Garrow to be her house guest. Garrow married her son Thomas Adolphus, and the three lived together until Trollope's death in 1863. She was buried near four other members of the Trollope household in the English Cemetery of Florence.

== Works ==
- Domestic Manners of the Americans (1832)
- The Refugee in America (1832)
- The Abbess (1833)
- Belgium and Western Germany in 1833 (1834)
- Tremordyn Cliff (1835)
- Paris and the Parisians in 1835 (1836)
- The Life and Adventures of Jonathan Jefferson Whitlaw, or Scenes on the Mississippi (1836) retitled Lynch Law; etc. in 1857 edition
- The Vicar of Wrexhill (1837)
- A Romance of Vienna (1938)
- Vienna and the Austrians (1838)
- The Widow Barnaby (1839)
- The Widow Married: A Sequel to the Widow Barnaby (1840)
- The Life and Adventures of Michael Armstrong, the Factory Boy (1840)
- One Fault, A Novel (1840)
- Charles Chesterfield, or the Adventures of a Youth of Genius (1841)
- A Visit to Italy (1842)
- The Ward of Thorpe-Combe (1842)
- The Barnabys in America (1843)
- Jessie Phillips: A Tale of the Present Day (1844)
- Young Love, A Novel (1844)
- Travels and Travelers: A Series of Sketches (1846)
- Father Eustace: A Tale of the Jesuits (1847)
- Town and Country, A Novel (1848)
- The Young Countess, or, Love and Jealousy (1848)
- The Old World and the New, A Novel (1849)
- The Lottery of Marriage (1849)
- Petticoat Government, A Novel (1850)
- Mrs. Mathews, or Family Mysteries, A Novel (1851)
- Uncle Walter, A Novel (1852)
- The Young Heiress, A Novel (1853)
- The Life and Adventures of a Clever Woman: Illustrated with Occasional Extracts from Her Diary (1854)
- Gertrude, or Family Pride (1855)
- Fashionable Life, or Paris and London (1856)

== See also ==
- Frances Trollope bibliography
- Trollope
- Frances Wright

== Sources ==
- Chisholm, Hugh, ed. (1911). "Trollope, Anthony" . Encyclopædia Britannica (11th ed.). Cambridge University Press. This article on her son has a short biography of her.
