= Tremordyn Cliff =

1835 novel

- Author: Frances Milton Trollope
- Language: English
- Genre: Silver Fork
- Publisher: Richard Bentley
- Publication date: 1835
- Publication place: United Kingdom
- Media type: Print

Tremordyn Cliff is an 1835 novel by the British author Frances Milton Trollope. It blends several genres but is often grouped with the silver fork novels that portrayed high society of the pre-Victorian era. It was written while she was living in Bruges in Belgium. It subverts many of the stereotypes of gender with its effeminate patriarch who receives a large inheritance rather than his more assertive sister Augusta. It was published in three volumes by the London publishing house Richard Bentley. A review in The Spectator's review suggested "in painting the vulgar, the half-bred, or better still, the underbred, she seems to luxuriate with congenial zest". The portrayal of a strong, authoritative woman became a theme of her writing.

== Bibliography ==
- Ayres, Brenda (ed.) Frances Trollope and the Novel of Social Change. Bloomsbury Academic, 2002.
- Dever, Carolyn & Niles, Lisa (ed.) The Cambridge Companion to Anthony Trollope. Cambridge University Press, 2010.
- Heineman, Helen. Mrs. Trollope: The Triumphant Feminine in the Nineteenth Century. Ohio University Press, 1979.
- Sutherland, John. The Longman Companion to Victorian Fiction. Routledge, 2014.
