= Michael Armstrong, the Factory Boy =

1840 novel

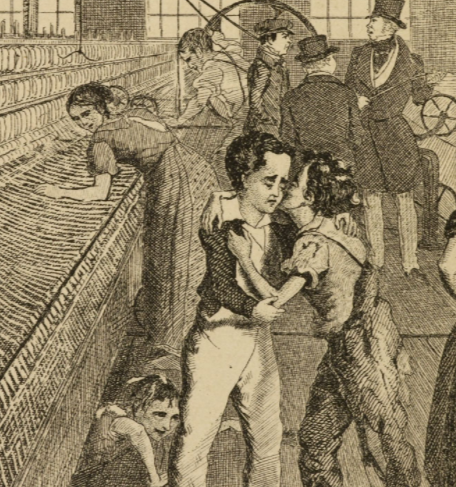
- Illustration of a scene in a cotton mill for the book by Auguste Hervieu
- Author: Frances Milton Trollope
- Language: English
- Genre: Social novel
- Publisher: Henry Colburn
- Publication date: 1840
- Publication place: United Kingdom
- Media type: Print

Michael Armstrong, the Factory Boy is an 1840 social novel by the British writer Frances Milton Trollope. It was originally serialized in months installments, and then published as a three volume novel. Inspired by a visit she had made to Manchester, it concerns issues of child labour in the cotton mills of the Industrial Revolution. It is also known by the longer title The Life and Adventures of Michael Armstrong, the Factory Boy.

== Bibliography ==
- Ayres, Brenda (ed.) Frances Trollope and the Novel of Social Change. Bloomsbury Academic, 2002.
- Hodson, Jane (ed.) Dialect and Literature in the Long Nineteenth Century. : Taylor & Francis, 2017.
- Wagner, Tamara. Frances Trollope: Beyond “Domestic Manners”. Routledge, 2013.
