= The Lottery of Marriage =

1849 novel

- Author: Frances Milton Trollope
- Language: English
- Genre: Silver Fork
- Publisher: Henry Colburn
- Publication date: 1849
- Publication place: United Kingdom
- Media type: Print

The Lottery of Marriage is an 1849 novel by the British writer Frances Milton Trollope. It was published in three volumes by Henry Colburn of London. Written in the tradition of the silver fork novel, it largely takes place in Dover on the coast of Kent. It contains elements of social satire as it depicts the progress of two different young woman entering the marriage market.

== Synopsis ==
The sheltered Fanny Thornton seeks marriage for security and protection while her more independent and worldly Cassandra de Laurie marries for the status that the match can bring.

== Bibliography ==
- Ayres, Brenda (ed.) Frances Trollope and the Novel of Social Change. Bloomsbury Academic, 2002.
- Morse, Deborah Denenholz, Markwick, Margaret & Turner, Mark W. (ed.)The Routledge Research Companion to Anthony Trollope. Taylor & Francis, 206.
- Wagner, Tamara. Frances Trollope: Beyond “Domestic Manners”. Routledge, 2013.
