= Frances Wright =

Scottish-American philosopher, feminist writer, and socialist activist and reformer

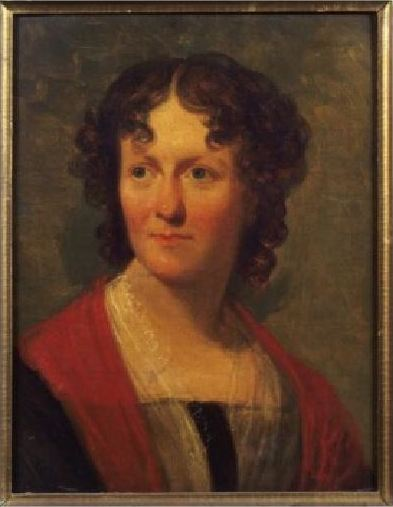
- Portrait by Henry Inman, 1824
- Born: September 6, 1795; Dundee, Scotland
- Died: December 13, 1852 (aged 57); Cincinnati, Ohio, US
- Other name: Fanny Wright
- Citizenship: United Kingdom; United States (from 1825)
- Occupations: Writer; lecturer; abolitionist; social reformer
- Known for: Feminism; free thinking; utopian community founder
- Spouse: Guillaume Phiquepal D'Arusmont (m. 1831)
- Children: 1

Frances Wright (September 6, 1795 – December 13, 1852), widely known as Fanny Wright, was a Scottish-born lecturer, writer, freethinker, feminist, utopian socialist, abolitionist, social reformer, and Epicurean philosopher, who became a US citizen in 1825. The same year, she founded the Nashoba Commune in Tennessee as a utopian community to demonstrate how to prepare slaves for eventual emancipation, but the project lasted only five years.

In the late 1820s, Wright was among the first women in America to speak publicly about politics and social reform before gatherings of both men and women. She advocated universal education, the emancipation of slaves, birth control, equal rights, sexual freedom, legal rights for married women, and liberal divorce laws. Wright was also vocal in her opposition to organized religion and capital punishment. The clergy and the press harshly criticized Wright's radical views. Her public lectures in the United States led to the establishment of Fanny Wright societies. Her association with the Working Men's Party, organized in New York City in 1829, became so intense that its opponents called the party's slate of candidates the Fanny Wright ticket.

Wright was also a writer. Her Views of Society and Manners in America (1821), a travel memoir that included observations on the political and social institutions of the United States, was very successful. She also authored “A Plan for the Gradual Abolition of Slavery in the United States Without Danger of Loss to the Citizens of the South” (1825), a description of her planned utopian community at Nashoba Plantation. In addition, Wright co-edited The New Harmony and Nashoba Gazette with Robert Dale Owen in New Harmony, Indiana, as well as other periodicals.

== Early life and education ==
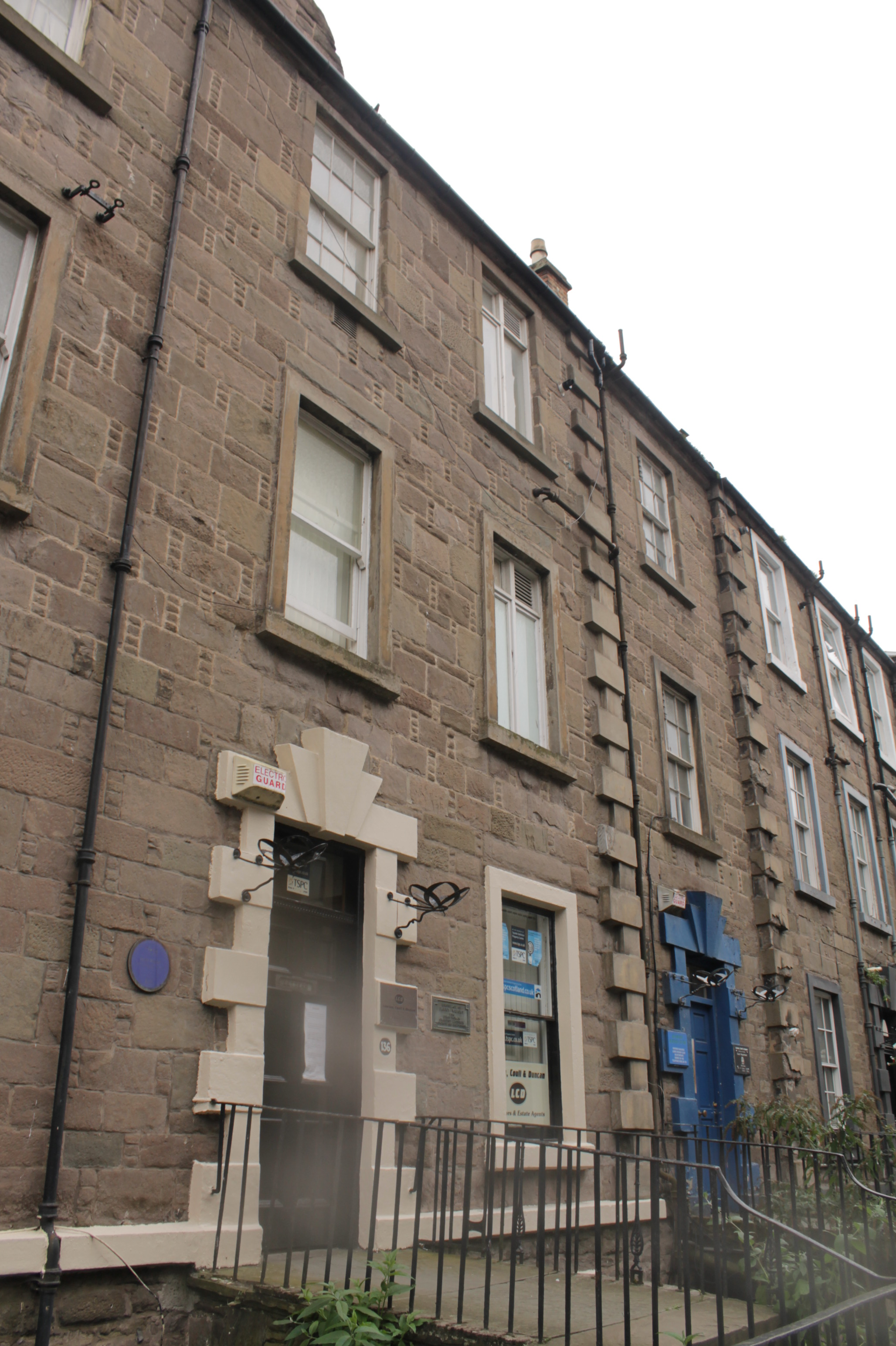
136 Nethergate Dundee

Frances "Fanny" Wright was born at 136 Nethergate in Dundee, Scotland, on September 6, 1795, to Camilla Campbell and her husband James Wright. Their house was then a newly built house by the town architect, Samuel Bell on the recently widened Nethergate, close to Dundee harbour.

Her father was a wealthy linen manufacturer, a designer of Dundee trade tokens, and a political radical. He corresponded with Adam Smith and was sympathetic to the American patriots and French republicans, including Gilbert du Motier, Marquis de Lafayette, and Thomas Paine. Frances, or "Fanny" as she was called since childhood, was the second eldest of the family's three children. Her siblings included an older brother, who died when Frances was still young, and a sister named Camilla. Wright's mother also died young, and her father died in 1798, when Frances was about the age of two. With support from a substantial inheritance, the orphaned Wright sisters were raised in England by members of the Campbell family, who were their mother's relatives.

A maternal aunt became Wright's guardian and taught her ideas founded on the philosophy of the French materialists. In 1813, when Wright was sixteen, she returned to Scotland to live with her great-uncle, James Mylne, a philosophy professor at Glasgow College. Wright was interested in the works of Greek philosophers, especially Epicurus, who was the subject of her first book, A Few Days in Athens (1822), which she had written by the age of eighteen. Wright also studied history and became interested in the United States' democratic form of government.

== First visits to the United States and France ==
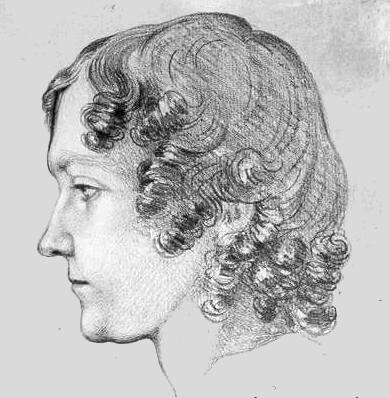
1835 portrait of Wright

Twenty-three-year-old Wright and her younger sister Camilla made their first trip to the United States in 1818. The sisters toured the country for two years before returning to England. While Wright was visiting New York City, Altorf, her play about the struggle for Swiss independence from Austria, was anonymously produced and performed beginning on February 19, 1819. However, it closed after three performances. For its Philadelphia premiere on January 5, 1820, an advertisement noted that it was "performed in New York last season with distinguished success."

Soon after her return to England in 1820, Wright published Views of Society and Manners in America (1821). The book's publication was a major turning point in her life. It brought her an invitation from Jeremy Bentham to join his circle of acquaintances, which included economist James Mill, politician Francis Plore, and author George Grote, among others. The group's opposition to religious clergy influenced Wright's own emerging philosophy.

In 1821, Wright traveled to France at the invitation of the Marquis de Lafayette and met with him in Paris. Despite the differences in their ages, the two became friends. At one point, Wright encouraged him to adopt her and her sister. Wright's request strained the relationship with General Lafayette's family, and no adoption occurred. Wright's friendship with the general continued after relations with his family were repaired. She also returned to Lafayette's home in France for a six-month visit in 1827 to work on a biography of him.

== Second visit to the United States ==
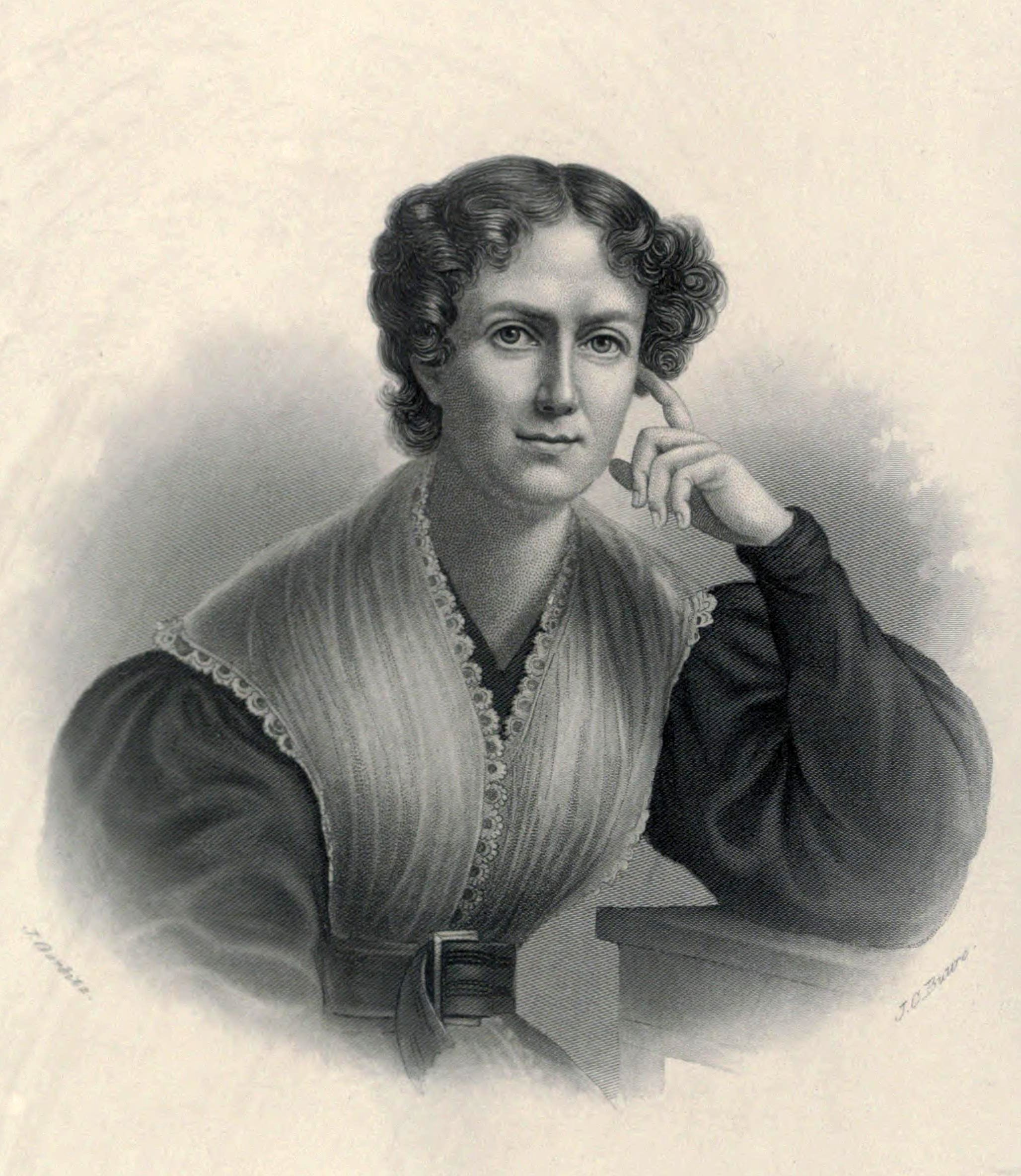
Frances Wright, c. 1825.

In 1824, Wright and her sister returned to the United States to follow the Marquis de Lafayette and his entourage during much of his farewell tour of the United States. Wright joined Lafayette for a two-week stay at Monticello, Thomas Jefferson's plantation in Virginia. In addition to Jefferson, Lafayette also introduced Wright to Presidents James Madison and John Quincy Adams, as well as General Andrew Jackson.

In February 1825, when Lafayette headed south, Wright traveled northwest to visit Harmonie, George Rapp's utopian community in Butler County, Pennsylvania. She also visited the Rappite colony established in Indiana, which was also named Harmonie. At that time, the Indiana community was in a period of transition. It had recently been sold to Welsh industrialist and social reformer Robert Owen, who renamed his utopian community New Harmony. Wright's visits to these utopian communities inspired her to form an experimental community, which she established in Tennessee. After leaving Indiana, she traveled along the Mississippi River with her new friend Emily Ronalds to rejoin Lafayette's group in New Orleans in April 1825. When Lafayette returned to France, Wright decided to remain in the United States, where she continued her work as a social reformer. It was also in 1825 that Wright became a U.S. citizen.

== Views ==
Wright believed in many foundational tenets of feminism, including equality in education between the sexes. She opposed organized religion, marriage, and capitalism. Educational opportunities were a particular interest. Along with Robert Owen, Wright demanded that the government offer free public education for all children after the age of twelve or eighteen months of age in federal government-supported boarding schools.

Wright was a vocal advocate of birth control, equal rights, sexual freedom, legal rights for married women, liberal divorce laws, the emancipation of slaves, and the controversial idea of interracial marriages. She tried to demonstrate through her experiment project in Tennessee what the utopian socialist Charles Fourier had said in France, "that the progress of civilization depended on the progress of women." Wright's opposition to slavery contrasted with the views of many other Democrats of the era, especially those of the South. Her activism on behalf of working men also distanced her from the leading abolitionists of the day.

== Career ==
=== Early career ===
Wright's early writing career included her book, Few Days in Athens (1822), which was a defense of the philosophy of Epicurus, written before the age of eighteen. Wright's Views of Society and Manners in America (1821), a memoir of her first visit to the United States, enthusiastically supported the country's democratic institutions. This book provides early descriptions of American life that preceded later works such as Alexis De Tocqueville's Democracy in America (1835 and 1840) and Harriet Martineau's Society in America (1837). Wright's book is also an example of an early nineteenth-century humanitarian perspective of the new democratic world. Historian Helen Elliott also pointed out that Wright's travelogue was "translated into several languages and widely read by liberals and reformers" in Great Britain, the United States, and Europe.

=== Nashoba experiment ===
In early 1825, after spending time at former President Jefferson's home in Virginia and Robert Owen's utopian settlement at New Harmony, Wright began developing her plans for an experimental farming community. By the summer of 1825, she sought advice from Lafayette and Jefferson, among others, to implement her ideas. Owen and Lafayette later became members of her project's board of trustees; however, Jefferson declined to participate. Wright also published A Plan for the Gradual Abolition of Slavery in the United States Without Danger of Loss to the Citizens of the South (1825), a tract that she hoped would persuade the U.S. Congress to set aside federal land for promoting emancipation. To demonstrate how enslaved people could be emancipated without their owners losing money, Wright established a model farming community in Tennessee where enslaved people could work to earn money to purchase their own freedom and receive an education.

Taking inspiration from the New Harmony community in Indiana, Wright traveled to Tennessee in the fall of 1825 and bought about 320 acres (130 hectares) of land along Wolf River about thirteen miles from Memphis. Wright founded a community at this wilderness site, which she named Nashoba. Emily Ronalds contributed £300 to the scheme. To demonstrate that her idea was a viable way to abolish slavery, Wright purchased about thirty enslaved people, nearly half of them children, to live in the experimental community. Her plan was for the enslaved people to acquire their freedom through labor on the property gradually. Wright also planned to eventually colonize the newly emancipated slaves to areas outside the United States.

In addition to building cabins and farm buildings, Wright planned to establish a school for black students. However, many abolitionists criticized her idea of gradual emancipation and educational training for formerly enslaved people. Wright joined in the early efforts to clear land and build log cabins for its inhabitants, which included blacks and whites. Nashoba was, however, plagued with difficulties from the start. It was built on mosquito-infested land conducive to malaria and failed to produce good harvests. Wright contracted malaria in the summer of 1826 and had to leave the property to recover her health in New Harmony, Indiana, and visits to France and England. While she was absent from Nashoba, the community declined. Its interim managers began instituting a policy of harsher punishments toward the black workers. A scandal also erupted over the community's tolerance of "free love" amid publicized accounts of an interracial relationship between James Richardson, a white supervisor of the community, and Josephone Lalotte, the mulatto daughter of a freed African American woman slave who had brought her family to live at Nashoba. Wright returned to Nashoba in 1828 with her friend, Frances Trollope, who spent ten days in the community and found it in disarray and on the verge of financial collapse. Trollope's published descriptions of the area criticized its poor weather, lack of scenic beauty, and Nashoba's remoteness and desolation.

In 1828, when Nashoba was rapidly declining, the New-Harmony Gazette published Wright's explanation and defense of the commune and her views on the principles of "human liberty and equality." In January 1830, Wright chartered a ship and accompanied the community's thirty slaves to Haiti, which had achieved independence in 1804, so they could live as free men and women. The failed experiment cost Wright about US$16,000. Germantown, Tennessee, a present-day suburb of Memphis, was established on the land where Nashoba once stood.

=== Newspaper editor ===
After Wright's failure at Nashoba in the late 1820s, she returned to New Harmony, Indiana, where she became the coeditor of The New Harmony and Nashoba Gazette (later renamed the Free Enquirer) with Robert Dale Owen, the eldest son of Robert Owen, the Owenite community's founder. In 1829, Wright and Robert Dale Owen moved to New York City, where they continued to edit and publish the Free Enquirer. Wright was also editor of The Sentinel (later titled New York Sentinel and Working Man's Advocate).

=== Political and social activist ===
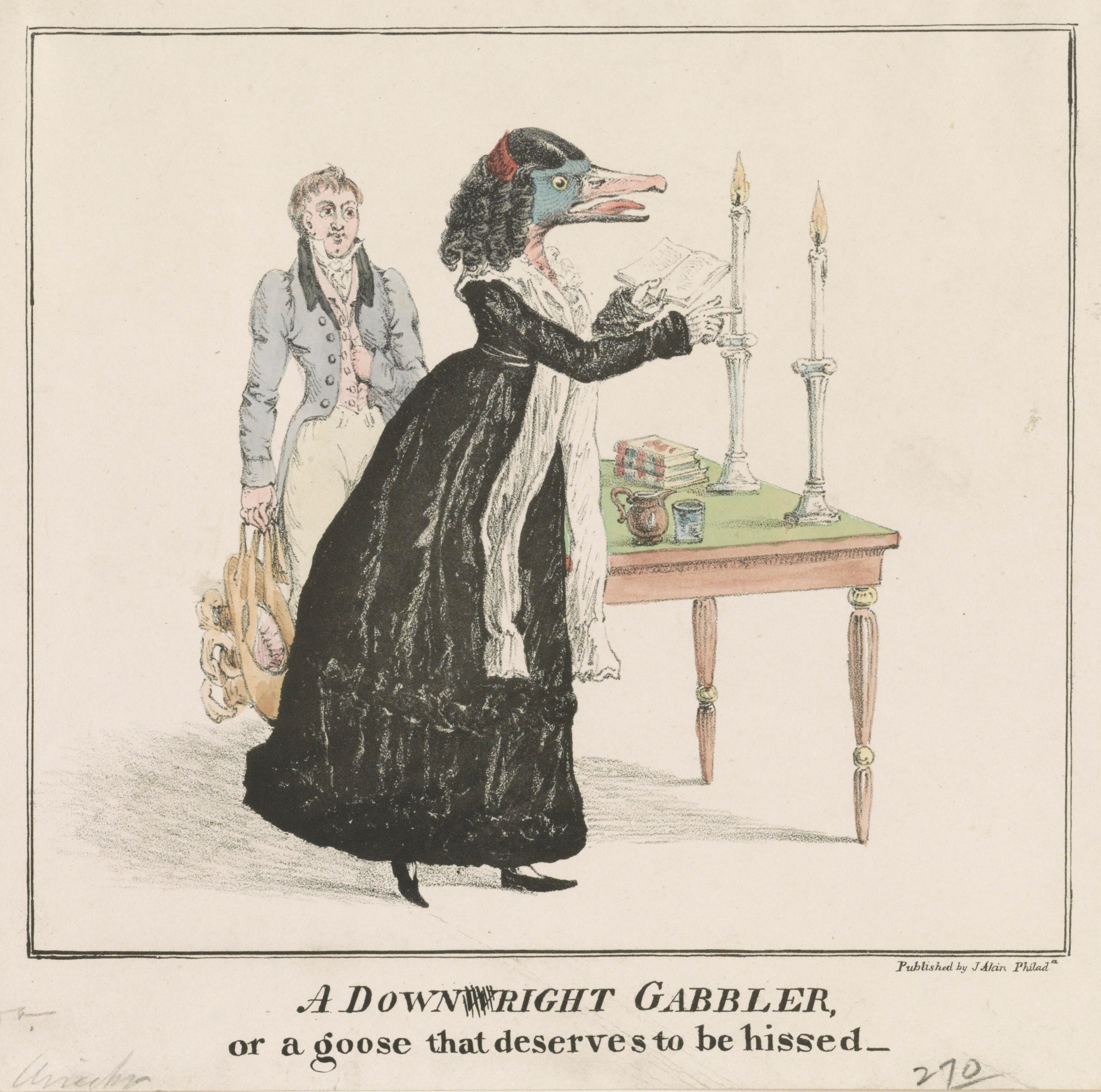
A hostile cartoon lampooning Wright for daring to deliver a series of lectures in 1829, at a time when many felt that public speaking was not an appropriate activity for women.

Beginning in the late 1820s and early 1830s, Wright spoke publicly in favor of abolition and lectured to support women's suffrage. She also campaigned for reforms to marriage and property laws. While residing in New York City, she purchased a former church in the Bowery area and converted it into a "Hall of Science" as a lecture hall. From 1833 to 1836, her lectures on slavery and other social institutions attracted large and enthusiastic audiences of men and women in the eastern United States and the Midwest, leading to the establishment of what were called Fanny Wright societies. Although her lecture tours extended to the principal cities of the United States, the enunciation of her views and publication of a collection of her speeches in her book, Course of Popular Lectures (1829 and 1836), met with opposition.

The clergy and the press were critical of Wright and her opinions on religion and social reform. The New York American, for example, called Wright "a female monster" because of her controversial views, but she was undeterred. As Wright's philosophy became even more radical, she left the Democratic Party to join the Working Men's Party, organized in New York City in 1829. Her influence on the Working Men's Party was so strong that its opponents called its slate of candidates the Fanny Wright ticket. Wright was also an activist in the American Popular Health Movement in the 1830s and advocated for women being involved in health and medicine.

== Personal life ==
Wright married French physician Guillaume D'Arusmont in Paris, France, on July 22, 1831. Wright met him at New Harmony, Indiana, where he was once a teacher. D'Arusmont accompanied her to Haiti in 1830, serving as her business manager. Wright's and D'Arusmont's daughter, Francès-Sylva Phiquepal D'Arusmont, was born on April 14, 1832.

== Later years ==
Wright, her husband, and their daughter traveled to the United States in 1835 and made several subsequent trips between the United States and Europe. Wright eventually settled in Cincinnati, Ohio, where she bought a home in 1844 and attempted to resume her career as a lecturer. Wright continued to travel the lecture circuit, but her appearances and views on social reform issues were not always welcome. She also became a supporter of President Andrew Jackson. After the mid-term political campaign of 1838, Wright suffered from various health problems. She published her final book, England, the Civilizer in 1848.

Wright divorced D'Arusmont in 1850. She also fought a lengthy legal battle to retain custody of their daughter and control of her own personal wealth. The legal proceedings remained unsettled at the time of Wright's death. Wright spent her last years in quiet retirement at Cincinnati, estranged from her daughter, Francès-Sylva D'Arusmont.

== Death and legacy ==
Wright died on December 13, 1852, in Cincinnati, Ohio, from complications of a broken hip after falling on ice outside her home. She is buried at the Spring Grove Cemetery in Cincinnati. Her daughter, Francès-Sylva D'Arusmont, inherited the majority of Wright's wealth and property.

Wright, an early women's rights advocate and a social reformer, was the first woman to deliver public lectures to men and women on political social reform issues in the United States in the late 1820s. Her views on slavery, theology, and women's rights were considered radical for that time, and attracted harsh criticism from the press and clergy.

The first volume of History of Woman Suffrage, published in 1881, states, “THESE VOLUMES ARE AFFECTIONATELY INSCRIBED TO THE Memory of Mary Wollstonecraft, Frances Wright, Lucretia Mott, Harriet Martineau, Lydia Maria Child, Margaret Fuller, Sarah and Angelina Grimké, Josephine S. Griffing, Martha C. Wright, Harriot K. Hunt, M.D., Mariana W. Johnson, Alice and Phebe Carey, Ann Preston, M.D., Lydia Mott, Eliza W. Farnham, Lydia F. Fowler, M.D., Paulina Wright Davis, Whose Earnest Lives and Fearless Words, in Demanding Political Rights for Women, have been, in the Preparation of these Pages, a Constant Inspiration TO The Editors”.

== Honors and memorials ==
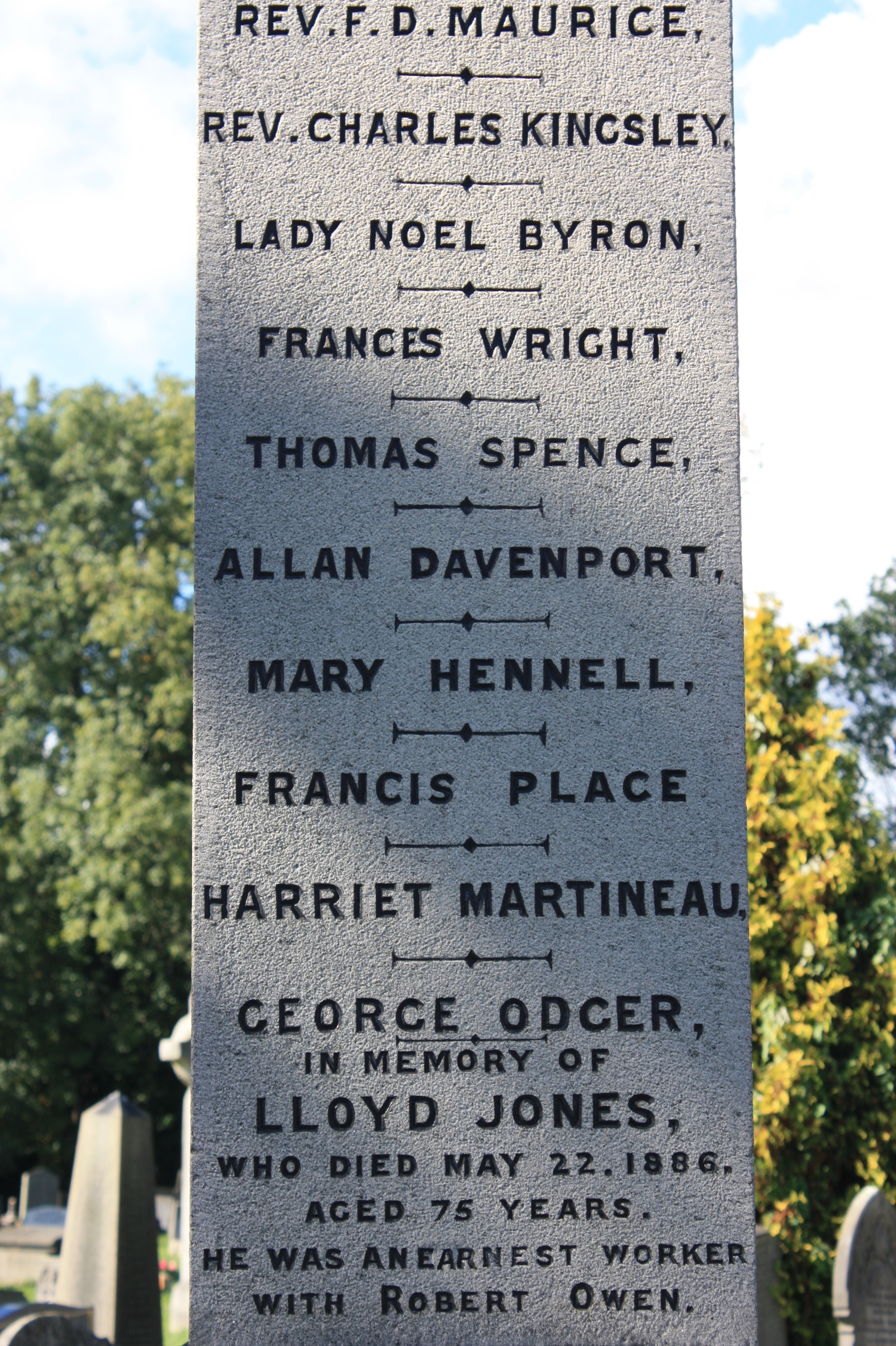
Base of the Reformers’ Memorial, Kensal Green Cemetery, including Frances Wright's name

- Wright's name is included on the Reformers’ Memorial in Kensal Green Cemetery in London.
- A plaque was installed on a wall of her birthplace at 136 Nethergate in Dundee, Scotland.
- Wright was inducted into the National Women's Hall of Fame in 1994.

== Selected published works ==
- Altorf: A Tragedy (Philadelphia, 1819)
- Views on Society and Manners in America (London, 1821)
- A Few Days in Athens (London, 1822)
- A Plan for the Gradual Abolition of Slavery in the United States (1825)
- Lectures on Free Inquiry (New York, 1829; 6th ed., 1836)
- Address on the State of the Public Mind and the Measures Which it Calls For (New York, 1829)
- Course of Popular Lectures (New York, 1829 and 1836)
- Explanatory Notes Respecting the Nature and Objects of the Institution of Nashoba (1830)
- What is the Matter? A Political Address as Delivered in Masonic Hall (1838)
- Fables (London, 1842)
- Political Letters, or, Observations on Religion and Civilization (1844)
- England the Civilizer: Her History Developed in Its Principles (1848)
- Biography, Notes, and Political Letters of Frances Wright D'Arusmont (1849)
