= A Romance of Vienna =

1838 novel

- Author: Frances Milton Trollope
- Language: English
- Genre: Silver Fork
- Publisher: Richard Bentley
- Publication date: 1838
- Publication place: United Kingdom
- Media type: Print

A Romance of Vienna is an 1838 novel by the British writer Frances Milton Trollope. Produced in the style of the popular silver fork novel of the period, it focuses on the glittering social life of Vienna the capital of the Austrian Empire. Trollope had recently visited the city and produced a travel guide Vienna and the Austrians the same year. This matching of a fictional and a non-fiction account of her travels had also featured in her 1832 novel The Refugee in America and Domestic Manners of the Americans. The book was published in three volumes by the London-based publishing house Richard Bentley. Her novel may have influenced her son Anthony Trollope's Nina Balatka.

== Bibliography ==
- Birns, Nicholas & Wirenius, John F. Anthony Trollope: A Companion. McFarland, 2021.
- Heineman, Helen. Mrs. Trollope: The Triumphant Feminine in the Nineteenth Century. Ohio University Press, 1979.
- Johnston, Judith. Victorian Women and the Economies of Travel, Translation and Culture, 1830–1870. Taylor & Francis, 2016.
