= How to Observe Morals and Manners =

1838 book by Harriet Martineau

How to Observe Morals and Manners is a sociological treatise on methods of observing manners and morals written by Harriet Martineau in 1837–8 after a tour of America. She stated that she wasn't looking for fodder for a book, but also privately remarked that "I am tired of being kept floundering among the details which are all a Hall and a Trollope (writer of Domestic Manners of the Americans) can bring away."

As opposed to Victorian prescriptive handbooks of how societies ought to behave, Martineau focuses on observing locals on their own terms and emphasizes the need to practice cultural relativism when observing other people.

== Manners and Morals ==
Martineau combined what she called manners and morals. She states that "Manners have not been treated of separately from Morals in any of the preceding divisions of the objects of the traveler's observation. The reason is, that manners are inseparable from morals, or, at least, cease to have meaning when separated".

This is distinctive against Mary Wollstonecraft who, in her preface to A Vindication of the Rights of Women, stated that "Manners and morals are so nearly allied that they have often been confounded; but, though the former should only be the natural reflection of the latter, yet, when various causes have produced factitious and corrupt manners, which are very early caught, morality becomes an empty name."

== Reactions ==
Among those influenced by this book was Charles Darwin, who wrote in one of his notebooks that he read it during the first half of August 1838. Darwin was inspired by Martineau's cultural relativism to conclude that morality can not only be influenced by culture, but also can be a social instinct that is shaped by heredity: "This probably is natural consequence of man, like deer, etc., being social animal, & this conscience or instinct may be most firmly fixed, but it will not prevent others being engrafted."
