= Uncle Walter (novel) =

1852 novel

- Author: Frances Milton Trollope
- Language: English
- Genre: Social novel
- Publisher: Henry Colburn
- Publication date: 1852
- Publication place: United Kingdom
- Media type: Print

Uncle Walter is an 1852 novel by the British writer Frances Milton Trollope. It was published in three volumes by the London publishing house Henry Colburn. The novel's interest in the governance of the Church of England and wariness of evangelicalism were continued in the works by her son in The Warden (1855) and the subsequent Chronicles of Barsetshire.

== Synopsis ==
Edward, a wealthy young man moves from the countryside London where he is embroiled in the manipulative social schemes of his aunt that include marrying him off to a woman of her choosing. This balanced by the advice of his shrewd Uncle Walter who manages to help him avoid an unhappy marriage.

== Bibliography ==
- Ayres, Brenda (ed.) Frances Trollope and the Novel of Social Change. Bloomsbury Academic, 2002.
- Bruce, Alex. The Cathedral 'Open and Free': Dean Bennett of Chester. Liverpool University Press, 2002.
- Wagner, Tamara. Frances Trollope: Beyond “Domestic Manners”. Routledge, 2013.
