= Domestic Manners of the Americans =

1832 travel book by Frances Milton Trollope

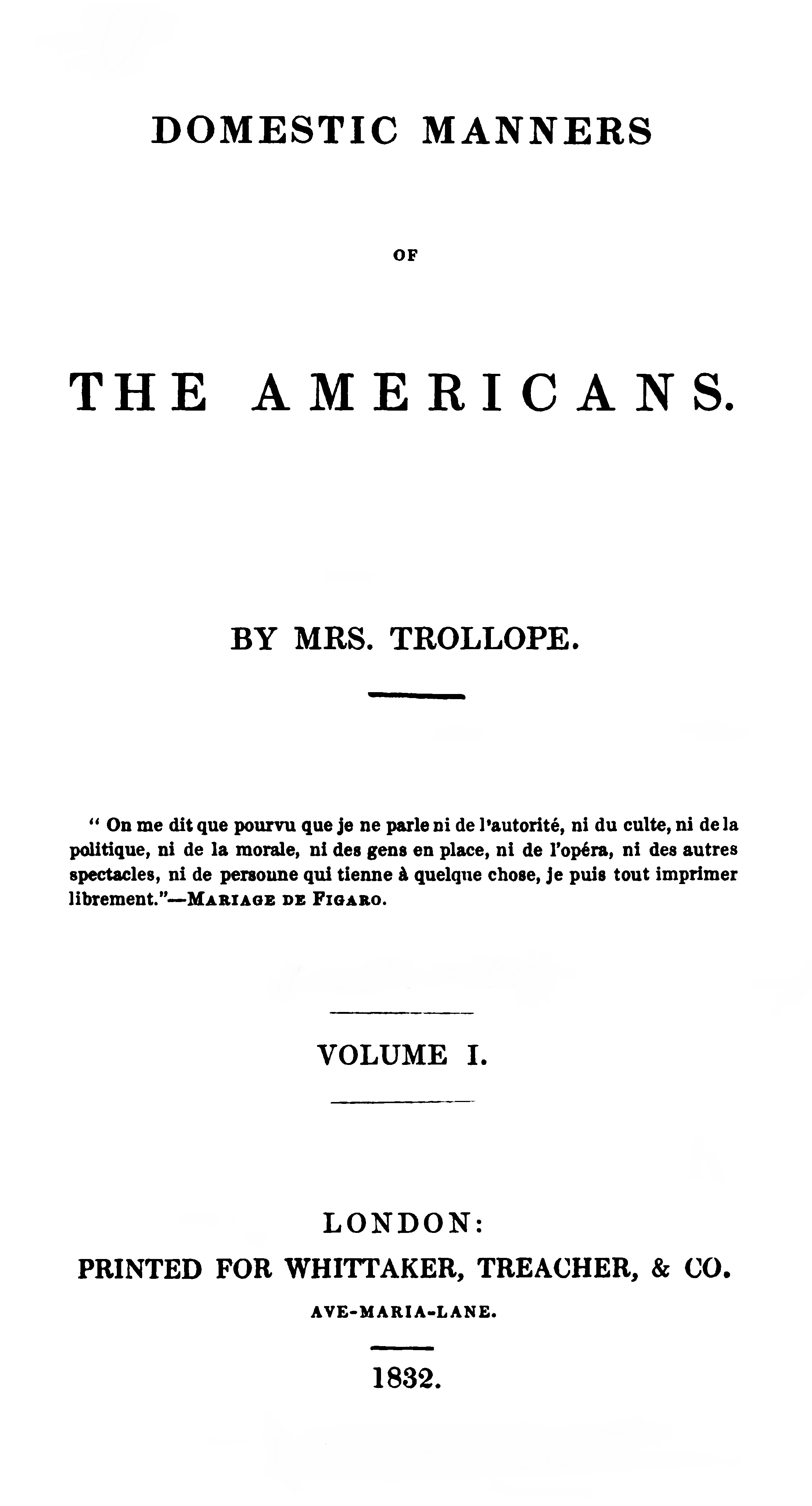
- First edition title page
- Author: Frances Milton Trollope
- Language: English
- Genre: Non-fiction
- Publication date: 1832
- Publication place: United Kingdom
- Media type: Print (Hardcover & Paperback) & E-book
- Pages: c.200 pp (May change depending on the publisher and the size of the text)

Domestic Manners of the Americans is a two-volume travel book by Frances Milton Trollope, published in 1832, which follows her travels through America and her residence in Cincinnati, at the time still a frontier town.

== Context ==
Frances Trollope travelled to the U.S. with her son Henry, "having been partly instigated by the social and communistic ideas of a lady whom I well remember, a certain Miss Wright, who was, I think, the first of the American female lecturers" (Anthony Trollope, An Autobiography). She briefly stayed at the Nashoba Commune, a utopian settlement for ex-slaves set up by Frances Wright in Tennessee, but was dismayed by the primitive conditions.

It had been only 15 years since the United Kingdom was at war with the United States and the earlier American Revolutionary War was still remembered. Trollope's own views on government contrasted with American-style republicanism. According to Katherine Moore, while in America, Trollope was unhappy as a result of financial and marital difficulties.

== Trollope's analysis of the USA ==
The book created a sensation on both sides of the Atlantic, as Frances Trollope had a caustic view of the Americans and found America strongly lacking in manners and learning. She was appalled by America's egalitarian middle-class and by the influence of evangelicalism that was emerging during the Second Great Awakening. Trollope was also harshly critical of slavery of African Americans in the United States, and by the popularity of tobacco chewing, and the consequent spitting, even on carpets.

After seeing much of what the United States had to offer, her overall impression was not favourable. At the end of the book, she tried to summarise what she found wrong in the American character:

A single word indicative of doubt, that any thing, or every thing, in that country, is not the very best in the world, produces an effect which must be seen and felt to be understood. If the citizens of the United States were indeed the devoted patriots they call themselves, they would surely not thus encrust themselves in the hard, dry, stubborn persuasion, that they are the first and best of the human race, that nothing is to be learnt, but what they are able to teach, and that nothing is worth having, which they do not possess.

== Reactions ==
The book was both highly controversial and highly successful, selling "like wildfire". It also enabled Trollope to become a wage-earner and save her family from penury. American author Mark Twain was amused and impressed by Trollope's observations of the Antebellum frontier America he grew up in: "Mrs Trollope was so handsomely cursed and reviled by this nation [for] telling the truth...she was painting a state of things which did not change at once...I remember it." Benjamin Perley Poore noted the energy with which her book reviled the frontier habit of expectoration. "So often did Mrs. Trollope recur to this habit," Poore wrote, "that she managed to give one the impression that this country was in those days a sort of huge spittoon."

The Quarterly Review praised Trollope's humour and descriptive skill:

... Nothing is so easy as speculating in our closets on the probable effects of any given arrangement of public affairs; and if the results of such imaginary politics were confined to the Utopias in which their ingenious authors gave them birth, we should have no objection to their theories. But when they are boldly obtruded upon the notice of the country as formulæ for actual practice, we feel it our duty, not to take these speculative conclusions for granted, but to turn the ' telescope of truth' to the existing facts themselves, and through the medium of an intelligent traveller's optics, ' bring life near in utter nakedness.' In this spirit we have read Mrs. Trollope's book with interest and instruction—we may add, with great amusement; for it is written with much humour, and is eminently graphic throughout,—touching with singular skill, a vast variety of topics, which, perhaps, only a female eye could correctly appreciate, or a female pen do justice to in description.

In a 1836 letter to the Ministry of War, Antonio López de Santa Anna quoted Trollope as an anti-slavery intellectual whose example must be followed. According to Katherine Moore (writing in 1985), Trollope "had no profundity of thought...but she had a seeing eye and a lively pen". Her descriptions are "never boring: she makes us see the lonely clearings and farms, the huge silent rivers, Niagara, untamed and unvulgarised, the clear bright air ..."

== See also ==
- How to Observe Morals and Manners
