= Windsor soup =

British soup

- Type: Soup
- Place of origin: Great Britain
- Main ingredients: Calf's feet, bouquet garni, Madeira wine
- Variations: White and brown soups

Windsor soup or Brown Windsor soup is a British soup. While commonly associated with the Victorian and Edwardian eras, the practice of calling it 'Brown Windsor' did not emerge until at least the 1920s, and the name was usually associated with low-quality brown soup of uncertain ingredients. Although Windsor soup included elegant recipes among famous chefs of the 19th century, the 'Brown Windsor' varieties became an institutional gruel that gained a reputation as indicative of bad English food during the mid-20th century, and a later source of jokes, myths and legends.

== Origins and heyday ==
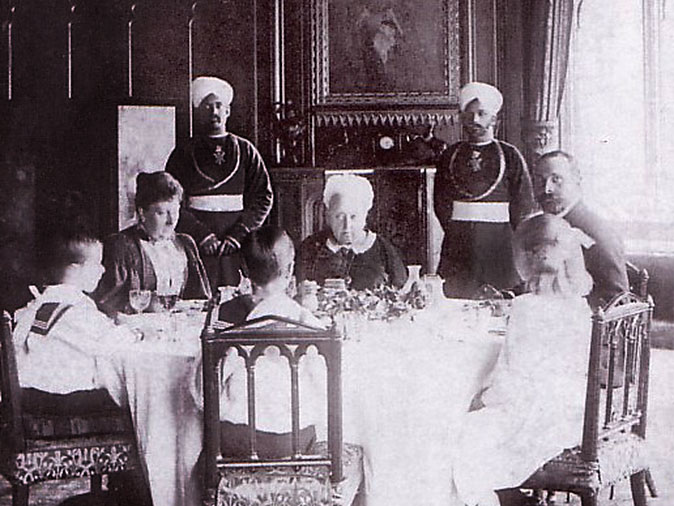
Queen Victoria luncheon at Windsor (1895) with her daughter Princess Beatrice's family. Victoria "embraced, wholeheartedly, all the world had to offer her to eat", including, on occasion, Windsor soup, though she never supped Brown Windsor soup.

In 1834 Henderson William Brand – chef to King George IV and the inventor of what would become A.1. Sauce – published a cookbook containing a recipe for Vermicelli Soup, à la Windsor. It is a white meat broth and noodle soup that Brand said was a favourite of George III and IV.

Another similar Windsor soup recipe was published 11 years later in the influential 1845 cookbook The Modern Cook by British-Italian Charles Elmé Francatelli, who was Queen Victoria's head chef from 1840 to 1842. He called it Calf's Feet Soup, a la Windsor (or Potage a la Windsor) and it was made from calf's feet or oxtail consomme creating a thick gelatine body, (Note: Before gelatin became widely available as a commercial product, the best gelatin for use in soups and desserts was derived from boiling calves' feet.) and includes white wine and cream, chicken and noodles – it is a white soup. The Modern Cook was an influential guide-book for Victorian women who wanted to emulate the Queen; it was a cooking bible in many households ensuring its currency at home and in upper-end restaurants. Contrary to beliefs that Queen Victoria ate the soup frequently, it rarely appeared on the royal menus, and never as a "brown" soup.

Variations on Francatelli's recipe appeared throughout the 19th century. Typical recipes called for calf's feet and Madeira wine, and was sometimes darkened to a deep brown with caramel colouring and spiced with cayenne pepper, as in a recipe by the Waldorf Astoria's maître d' Oscar Tschirky. A 'white' version that uses Windsor beans was published in 1855. Some were made from mutton, beef and rice. Agnes Marshall had a simple barley and meat version, and French chef Auguste Escoffier created a creamy Windsor soup at the Savoy Hotel restaurant in the 1890s, a favourite eatery for English royalty including the Prince of Wales.

== Decline and fall ==
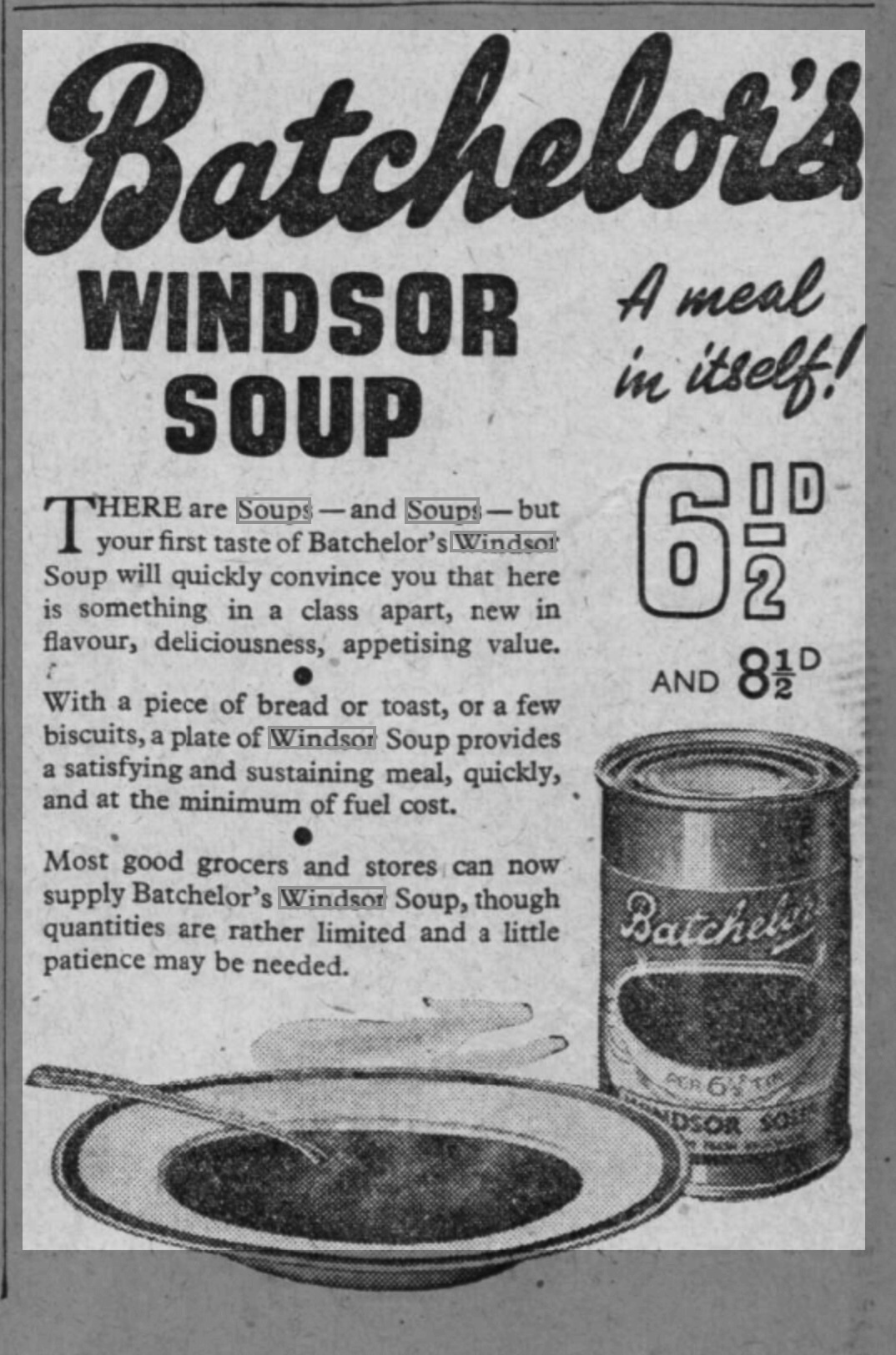
Batchelor's Windsor Soup (1942)

By the 1920s, enthusiasm for Windsor soup was perceptibly waning. As Evelyn Waugh noted in 1924, "things were not as good as they used to be—including Windsor soup". Windsor soup was transforming into an icon of dreary British cuisine. Michael Bateman states, "In the 1930s, the art of soupmaking sank to an all-time low and every hotel offered disgusting brown soups (so-called Brown Windsor soup)". The so-called "brown Windsor soup" first appeared in the 1920s, when it was served aux masses in cafes and cafeterias. Examples include Cadena Cafes (Portsmouth) which advertised "Soup – Tomato or Brown Windsor" on its menu dated 24 February 1926. Bobby's of Queens Road, Bristol, advertised "Potage Brown Windsor" (under the "soup" heading) on its menu dated 13 February 1931. The Scottish department store Isaac Benzie advertised "Brown Windsor soup" in a menu published 14 December 1933.

The easy availability of tinned and packet soups was driving soup in new directions, for example there was a "Batchelor's Windsor Soup" sold in a tin can during the 1940s. With wartime rationing, some towns kept stocks of canned Windsor. P. D. James reminisced that during the war, "brown Windsor soup featured largely on the menus of British Restaurants set up under the aegis of the Ministry of Food ... the soup tasted of gravy browning." Author Eric Wright recalled being indigent in 1945 and eating free Windsor soup at a cafeteria run by the Asiatic Petroleum Company.

After the war, food rationing continued into the 1950s. Leftovers would be pureed or mixed into brown mystery soups whose connection with the original Windsor recipe may have been in name only. The soup may have been nothing more than a watery, tasteless gruel made from bouillon powder and starch thickener, or leftover cans: "I can remember cans of Windsor in my grandmother's larder, which she kept from the war. Humorously thought of as only to be used in the event of an invasion."

Satirists began poking fun at Brown Windsor in the 1950s because on the one hand it was rubbish served in shabby establishments, on the other it had a pretentiously posh name. Annie Gray notes that despite the jokes it was in fact "a real soup", but one "largely associated with shabby boarding houses trying to sound posh." Nicholas Parsons confirms "It was very much part of the culture when I was young. Nearly every cheap hotel had brown Windsor soup. I think hotels used all the remains of their meat ... and it was always on the menu. It was such a staple item you either laughed at it or ignored it. It was an object of ridicule and humour." For example, in a play published in 1958, John Osborne asserts "the only fit place for it is the sink." Satirists often say they had only ever had it once, for example Jane Garmey recalled "having tasted it once I knew better than to risk the experience again", and Nicholas Parsons jokingly said he only ever had it "the once". Honor Tracy observed, "Anyone fool enough to eat in a provincial English hotel, for whatever reason, deserves no sympathy – this nation seems hooked on Brown Windsor soup." By 1984, it was becoming legendary, as R. W. Apple Jr. noticed: "Slowly, ever so slowly over the last twenty-five years, good restaurants have come into being in almost all parts of the kingdom. Brown Windsor soup, thanks heavens, is an endangered species."

== Myths and legends ==
External image
- A modern Brown Windsor soup (archive) airplane meal (UK to Saudi Arabia), with croutons and parsley. Windsor soup was traditionally served with Madeira wine.

A number of myths, legends and assumptions grew around the soup. Some sources assert that Brown Windsor soup was not popular in reality, and was primarily a joke meme that originated with the 1953 Ealing Studios film comedy The Captain's Paradise. By this argument, the soup's name was repeated in the memoirs of many authors over the following decades who misremembered (intentionally or otherwise) the popularity or even existence of the soup, to artistic or humorous effect. As noted by John Lanchester, "There is a sinister genius in the very name Brown Windsor soup".

One researcher found a number of recipes for a 'brown soup' that is a bone-based broth with some similarities to Windsor soup, and hypothesized there might have been a commingling of 'Windsor soup' and 'brown soup' in the memories of later commentators. This connection was made in a 1958 New Yorker restaurant review, "The cold meat was quite good, and the flavour of the fine brown soup recalls the war," to which another reviewer responds, "A fine brown soup-formally listed on British menus as a "Brown Windsor soup" is as hard to imagine as a fine kind of dislocated elbow."

A number of authors have noted the similarities with "Brown Windsor soap", which was well known in the Victorian era, and suggested there might be a connection. A 1937 issue of Punch remarked tongue-in-cheek, "The Brown Windsor Soup so often found on British menus does not really exist at all; it is a misprint for Brown Windsor Soap."

Etymologist Michael Quinion incorrectly reports the earliest known reference is from 1943, in The Fancy, by Monica Dickens. In 1915, author Edith Siepen says the soup originated in France, probably a misunderstanding due to the early French name in The Modern Cook.

Windsor and/or Brown Windsor has been associated with the British Railways by a number of authors, although historians have had trouble verifying it ever existed. Malcolm Timperley, a researcher in the National Railway Museum's library and archives, reported that their team specifically researched the existence of Brown Windsor soup in British dining cars. After checking scores of menus dating back to the nineteenth century they failed to find any mention of it. Nevertheless, according to author Paul Spicer, Brown Windsor was popular on British railways, and "was often said to have built the British Empire". Author Jane Garmey, writing about it in 1981, said Brown Windsor was "continually served by British Railways in their dining cars", and from her childhood memories she "assumed it was the only soup that could be served on a train" due to its ubiquity. Fictional barrister Rumpole of the Bailey mentioned eating it on the Great Western Railway in a book of short stories dated 1978, although Quinion questions whether this is an endorsement of the soup, "the extract confirms that the soup was at one time a staple of the restaurant menus of British Railways," in Quinion's view.

== In popular culture ==
In Hancock's Half Hour, episode "Air Crew Only", the in-flight meal starts with "Brown Windsor soup just burnt enough to leave that attractive brown ring sticking round the edge of the plate", a line re-used from the radio episode "The End of the Series" (1955). Hancock also mentions it in "The Espresso Bar" (1956), and in a sketch in the fourth episode of his 1956 Associated-Rediffusion series The Tony Hancock Show.

In the Agatha Christie's Poirot episode "Hercule Poirot's Christmas", Poirot asks a waiter "What is this Brown Windsor Soup?" to which the waiter responds, "It is soup from Windsor"; later, Poirot laments to the waiter that the Brown Windsor soup he has been served "doesn't look very... delicieux".

In "Basil the Rat," the last episode of Fawlty Towers, the upper-class couple who have the rat under their table order a Windsor soup as their starter.

In the play Jeffrey Bernard Is Unwell (1990) by Keith Waterhouse, the titular character laments and satirizes the fact that one is likely damned to die in hospital with Windsor Soup as a component of their last meal.

In the 2021 BBC One TV series Around the World in 80 Days, the lead character Phileas Fogg (David Tennant) goes to the Reform Club each morning, where his friends know in advance what he will order for lunch: Brown Windsor soup. To which one friend tells him, "Some are born to adventure and others, frankly, are not". It is an anachronistic joke, Brown Windsor Soup is not known to have existed prior to the 1920s.

== See also ==
- Geographically indicated foods of the United Kingdom
- Hot pot (disambiguation)
- Lancashire hotpot
- List of soups
- Pottage
