= Martha Bradley =

British cookery book writer (fl. 1740s–1755)

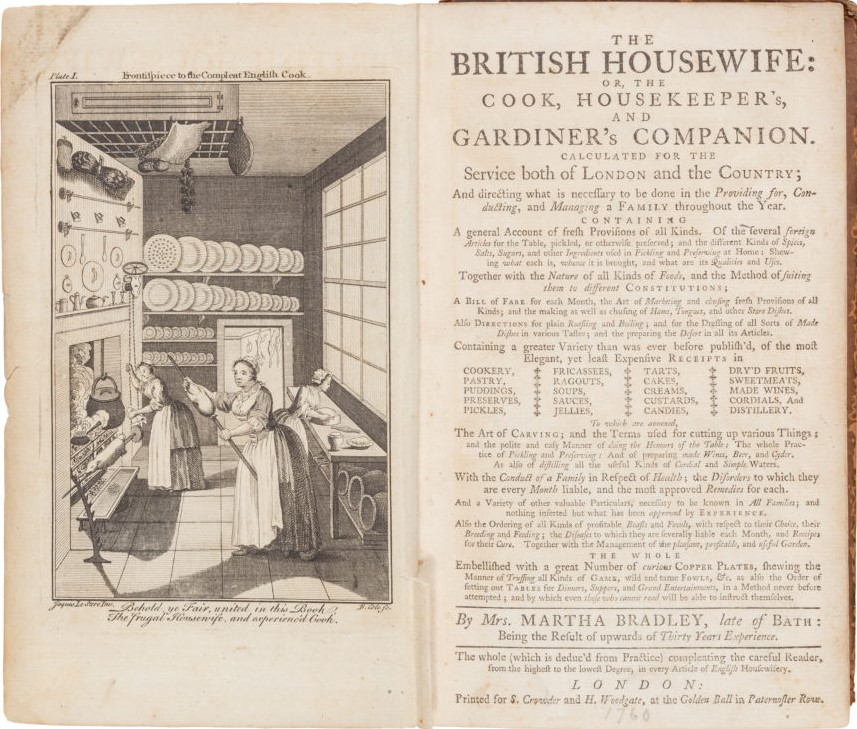
The frontispiece and titlepage of Bradley's 1758 work The British Housewife

Martha Bradley (fl. 1740s–1755) was a British cookery book writer. Little is known about her life, except that she published the cookery book The British Housewife in 1756 and worked as a cook for over thirty years in the fashionable spa town of Bath, Somerset.

Bradley's only printed work, The British Housewife was released as a 42-issue partwork between January and October 1756. (Note: The full title was The British Housewife or, the Cook, Housekeeper's and Gardiner's Companion. Calculated for the Service Both of London and the Country.) It was published in a two-volume book form in 1758, and is more than a thousand pages long. It is likely that Bradley was dead before the partwork was published. The book follows the French style of nouvelle cuisine, distinguishing Bradley from other female cookery book writers at the time, who focused on the British or English style of food preparation. The work is carefully organised and the recipes taken from other authors are amended, suggesting she was a knowledgeable and experienced cook, able to improve on existing dishes.

Because of the length of The British Housewife, it was not reprinted until 1996; as a result, few modern writers have written extensively on Bradley or her work.

== Life ==
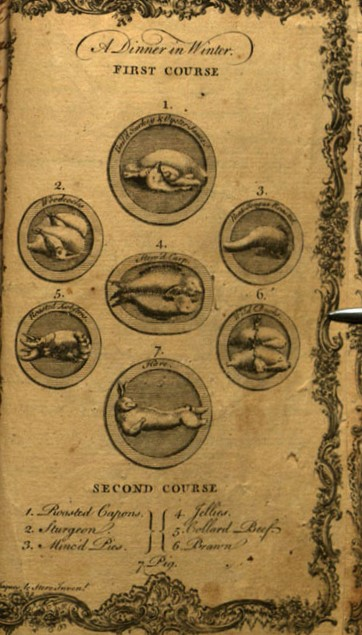
Illustrated example of a dinner in winter, as suggested by Bradley

Little is known about the life of Martha Bradley, and what there is has come from her single publication, The British Housewife. In the 1740s she worked as a professional cook in the fashionable spa town of Bath, Somerset, and had over thirty years' experience in the job. The publisher of The British Housewife noted that all of Bradley's papers had been stored with him; the food historian Gilly Lehmann considers this shows Bradley was dead by the time the work was published in the late 1750s. Included in the papers was a handwritten family recipe collection. A reference in the work to William Hogarth's 1753 book The Analysis of Beauty indicates that at least some of the book was written after that date.

Based on the recipes shown in her work, Lehmann contends that Bradley had read several contemporary cookery books, including those by Mary Eales (Mrs Mary Eales's Receipts, 1718), Patrick Lamb (Royal Cookery, 1726—the third edition), Vincent La Chapelle (The Modern Cook, 1733) and Hannah Glasse (The Art of Cookery Made Plain and Easy, 1747). The recipes from these have all been changed and improved from the originals, with a reduced set of ingredients and simplified instructions; according to the food writer Alan Davidson, this showed she had been knowledgeable and able in her chosen career. According to Lehmann The British Housewife was more than just a cookery book, but instead was "a complete manual for the housewife, the cook, the housekeeper, the gardener and the farrier, with monthly sections of advice and recipes which cover every aspect of domestic management in the middle of the eighteenth century".

The British Housewife was first published as a partwork in 42 weekly editions, possibly the first cookery book issued in this manner; the first issue was on 10 January 1756. The weekly editions comprised "four large half-sheets of printing" costing 3d. The weekly editions would have finished in October that year, and would have cost 10s 6d in total. (Note: 10s 6d equates to approximately £98.71 in 2025, according to calculations based on the Consumer Price Index measure of inflation.) The partworks were advertised across Britain, including Oxford, Leeds, Manchester and Sussex. In the text of the partworks Bradley would advertise the other issues, telling readers "We have in our preceding numbers given the cook so ample instruction for the roasting of all plain joints of meat ... that she cannot be at a loss in any of them".

The work was published in book form in 1758; its two volumes comprised over 1,200 pages. Some sources show differing dates. Virginia Maclean's 1981 history A Short-Title Catalogue of Household and Cookery Books Published in the English Tongue, 1701–1800 put the publication date at 1760, but Arnold Oxford's 1913 work English Cookery Books to the Year 1850 listed it as c. 1770 with 752 pages.

== The British Housewife (1758) ==
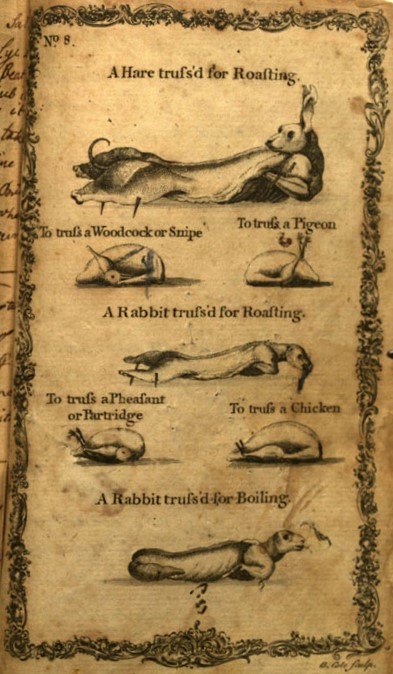
Game cuts trussed for roasting; an illustration from The British Housewife

The British Housewife, as published in 1758, contains recipes for fricassees, ragùs (which Bradley spelled "Ragoo"), collops, pilafs, pasties, pies (including oyster and eel), fish dishes, soups (which she spelled as both "soup" and "soop"), bisques, desserts—including puddings, jellies, pancakes, fritters, flummeries, cakes syllabubs and confectionery—and preserved foods, including pickles and jams. Bradley also included a section dedicated to distilling spirits, as well as making wine, beer and cider. Bradley's recipes include most parts of the animal, including the intestines, cockscombs, knuckle, head, heart, tongue, udder, trotters, feet, ears and cheeks. The book also contained a chapter on cures for common ailments, which included a recipe that used powdered earthworm to cure ague.

The British Housewife showed a "sophisticated organisation", according to Davidson, and Petits Propos Culinaires considers that Bradley's "scheme for the education of the cook and housewife was more thorough than any that had gone before". The literary historian Henry Notaker identifies strong pedagogical form and strategy within the book. This is highlighted by Bradley when she writes: "in all studies it is the regular practice to begin with the plainest and easiest things, and from there to arise to such as are more difficult", and she progressed from techniques such as roasting and boiling "and thence leading the cook to the most elegant and difficult made dishes". The food historian Sandra Sherman sees a pedagogical form in the layout of the recipes, and notes the "deliberate, reinforcing logic [that] entails the reader's attentiveness in a process that produces results". Sherman sees "a slightly disciplinary edge" in Bradley's approach in ensuring that the readers followed the instructions, and reports that the structure "makes ... [the book's] advice seem consistent, accurate, and acceptable". The culinary historians Anne Willan, Mark Cherniavsky and Kyri Claflin describe Bradley as "the consummate cooking teacher", and her book as "a cooking course that starts with the basics and builds in complexity".

The work was divided into monthly sections and these allowed Bradley to reflect the natural pace of the seasons in line with the available supply of produce for each month. According to Sherman, it was "designed to bring out the best in available provisions, and like such texts it contains elaborate directions for putting foods by". In doing so, the book "integrates food preparation with its production, that is, with gardening and raising animals", and thus provides a holistic approach to food planning and preparation.

As with many of the cookery books of the period, The British Housewife has nationalistic elements. Bradley's recipes strongly favour British ingredients, and there is no reference to French drinks, such as claret, Burgundy or champagne; instead, she calls for home-made turnip or raisin wines, and favours port ten times more than any other wine. Included in the ingredients described as being traditionally English were those imported from the British colonies of Asia, Africa and the Americas. Bradley describes how cayenne pepper is "imported ... from the negroes of our plantations. The fruit is common in Africa, they have been accustomed to eat it there, shewed our people the way in America, and they have taught us". The Anglicist Wendy Wall notes that this demonstrated the connection between the British cook and the slave system.

Despite the nationalistic approach, there are strong French influences throughout the book. This includes the French style of a circular dining table, with the symmetrical placement of dishes and plates for a diner's ease; Bradley was one of the very few female cookery book writers in eighteenth-century England to write in support of the French style of nouvelle cuisine. (Note: The term nouvelle cuisine (French for "new cooking") was introduced in 1742 by Francois Menon in his work Nouvelle traité de la cuisine. He used it to describe an approach to food that provided an elegant dish but without the excessive decoration which the hallmark of older styles. A new style of cooking—often named as a nouvelle cuisine—is introduced once a century. The most recent was popular in the 1970s.) Bradley described her aim for the book thus, "Our cook ... will be able to show that an English girl, properly instructed at first, can equal the best French gentleman in everything but expense." Economy and practicality are shown throughout her approach, according to the food historian Ivan Day; he classes Bradley alongside Hannah Glasse and Elizabeth Raffald in this respect. All three showed an economical aspect to their recipes, unlike the male cookery book writers of the time who, Day observes, "liked to show off with a flamboyant style of cooking".

Although Bradley gave support for some aspects of French dining, she was also happy to criticise the French's approach to certain dishes, including their habit of using ingredients that have the effect of hiding the flavour of some elements of the dish. At the end of a recipe for roast capon with herbs, she advises that adding a "raggoo" (a sauce (Note: A "raggoo" was originally a rich garnish made from savouries in a rich sauce; this was a development brought in from France; the word comes from the French en ragout.)) will make it more fashionable, but not improve it:

The French, who never know when to stop, serve up a capon done in this manner with a rich raggoo about it, but this is confusion, and the taste of one thing destroys that of another. They who would be at the top of the French taste may serve it in this manner, but with gravy it is a very delicate and fine dish, and no way extravagant in the expense.

The French were not the only nation to face criticism; one recipe for roast pork discusses Germanic animal husbandry practices: "The Germans whip him to death, but they deserve the same fate for their cruelty; there is no occasion for such barbarity to make a dainty dish".

The British Housewife contains several illustrations throughout. The frontispiece of the book shows three women working in a kitchen above the motto "Behold you fair, united in this book. The frugal housewife and the experienced cook." Other illustrations comprise examples of how to truss cuts of game, samples of menus to have at different times of the year and how to lay food on a table in a pleasing manner. According to Bradley, the illustrations were more than just for decoration; they served the purpose that "even those who cannot read will be able to instruct themselves". When discussing the placement of dishes on the table, she writes: "To please the palate is one design of this branch of study, and to please the eye is another".

The British Housewife has been used as a source in several works of social and food history, and Bradley's recipes still appear in modern cookery books. (Note: For example in Amanda Vickery's Behind Closed Doors: At Home in Georgian England, Laura Mason's The Taste of Britain, Claire Hopley's The History of Christmas Food and Feasts, Mason and Sara Paston-Williams's Grandma's Cookbook, Paul Waddington's Seasonal Food: A Guide to What's in Season When and Why and Trudy Eden's The Early American Table: Food and Society in the New World.) The book was used in Colonial America and Ireland. The scale of the book—at over 1,000 pages—ensured the work was not reprinted until 1996, which meant it fell out of public knowledge and few modern writers have written extensively on Bradley or her work. Davidson, who considers The British Housewife "the most interesting of the 18th century English cookery books", thinks "one has the feeling in reading ... [Bradley's] work that here is a real person, communicating effectively with us across the centuries". The Anglicist Robert James Merrett considers the work "the most encyclopedic and personally engaged cookbook of the century". Lehmann opines that Bradley's personal involvement in developing the recipes stands out in the book. Writing in the Oxford Dictionary of National Biography, she considers that:

Bradley is one of the most important cookery writers of the eighteenth century, not only because her book is one of the most comprehensive of its kind but also because she discusses the merits and difficulties of the dishes, gives information on European as well as English cookery, and tells the reader what is old-fashioned and what is up to date. In an age when most cookery books were simply compilations Mrs Bradley's book stands out for the author's personal involvement in her recipes.

== Notes and references ==
=== Sources ===
==== Books ====
- Bradley, Martha (1760). The British Housewife. London: S. Crowder and H. Woodgate. OCLC 221271624.
- Colquhoun, Kate (2007). Taste: The Story of Britain Through its Cooking. New York: Bloomsbury. ISBN 978-1-5969-1410-0.
- Davidson, Alan (2014). The Oxford Companion to Food. Oxford: Oxford University Press. ISBN 978-0-19-104072-6.
- Day, Ivan (2009). Cooking in Europe, 1650–1850. Westport, Connecticut: Greenwood Press. ISBN 978-0-3133-4624-8.
- Eden, Trudy (2010). The Early American Table: Food and Society in the New World. DeKalb, Illinois: Northern Illinois University Press. ISBN 978-0-87580-383-8.
- Hopley, Claire (2009). The History of Christmas Food and Feasts. Barnsley, South Yorkshire: Remember When. ISBN 978-1-8446-8065-8.
- Lehmann, Gilly (2003). The British Housewife: Cooking and Society in 18th-century Britain (Kindle ed.). Totness, Devon: Prospect Books. ISBN 978-1-909248-00-7.
- Maclean, Virginia (1981). A Short-Title Catalogue of Household and Cookery Books Published in the English Tongue, 1701–1800. London: Prospect Books. ISBN 978-0-9073-2506-2.
- Mason, Laura (2004). Food Culture in Great Britain. Westport, Connecticut: Greenwood Publishing Group. ISBN 978-0-313-32798-8.
- Mason, Laura (2006). The Taste of Britain. London: Harper Press. ISBN 978-0-0072-4132-3.
- Mason, Laura; Paston-Williams, Sara (2013). Grandma's Cookbook. London: Pavilion Books. ISBN 978-1-907892-71-4.
- Meacham, Sarah H. (2009). Every Home a Distillery: Alcohol, Gender, and Technology in the Colonial Chesapeake. Baltimore, Maryland: Johns Hopkins University Press. ISBN 978-0-8018-9791-7.
- Merrett, Robert James (2012). "The Culinary Art of Eighteenth-Century Women Cookbook Authors". In Potter, Tiffany (ed.). Women, Popular Culture, and the Eighteenth Century. Toronto: University of Toronto Press. pp. 115–132. ISBN 978-1-4426-8998-5.
- Merrett, Robert James (2021). Imperial Paradoxes: Training the Senses and Tasting the Eighteenth Century. Montreal: McGill-Queen's University Press. ISBN 978-0-2280-0796-8.
- Oxford, Arnold (1913). English Cookery Books to the Year 1850. Oxford: Oxford University Press. OCLC 252887531.
- Pinkard, Susan (2009). A Revolution in Taste: The Rise of French Cuisine, 1650-1800. Cambridge University Press. ISBN 978-0-5218-2199-5.
- Notaker, Henry (2017). A History of Cookbooks: From Kitchen to Page over Seven Centuries. Berkeley, California: University of California Press. ISBN 978-0-5209-6728-1.
- Quayle, Eric (1978). Old Cook Books: An Illustrated History. London: Cassell. ISBN 978-0-289-70707-4.
- Sherman, Sandra (2004a). Fresh from the Past: Recipes and Revelations from Moll Flanders' Kitchen. Lanham, Maryland: Taylor Trade. ISBN 978-1-5897-9088-9.
- Sherman, Sandra (2010). Invention of the Modern Cookbook. Westport, Connecticut: Greenwood Press. ISBN 978-1-5988-4486-3.
- Vickery, Amanda (2009). Behind Closed Doors: At Home in Georgian England. New Haven, Connecticut: Yale University Press. ISBN 978-0-3001-5453-5.
- Waddington, Paul (2004). Seasonal Food: A Guide to What's in Season When and Why. London: Transworld Publishers. ISBN 978-1-9039-1952-1.
- Wall, Wendy (2016). Recipes for Thought: Knowledge and Taste in the Early Modern English Kitchen. Philadelphia, Pennsylvania: University of Pennsylvania Press. ISBN 978-0-8122-4758-9.
- Willan, Anne; Cherniavsky, Mark; Claflin, Kyri (2012). Cookbook Library: Four Centuries of the Cooks, Writers and Recipes That Made the Modern Cookbook. Berkeley, California: University of California Press. ISBN 978-0-5203-5261-2.

==== Journals and magazines ====
- Davidson, Alan (1989). "Truffles and Morels in 18th Century Recipes". Petits Propos Culinaires. 33: 11–14.
- "Review: Mrs Martha Bradley, The British Housewife (1758)". Petits Propos Culinaires. 54: 40–41. 1995.
- Sexton, Regina (2015). "Food and Culinary Cultures in Pre-Famine Ireland". Proceedings of the Royal Irish Academy: Archaeology, Culture, History, Literature. 115 (1): 257–306. doi:10.1353/ria.2015.0008.
- Sherman, Sandra (Winter 2004b). "'The Whole Art and Mystery of Cooking': What Cookbooks Taught Readers in the Eighteenth Century". Eighteenth-Century Life. 28 (1): 115–135. doi:10.1215/00982601-28-1-115.
- Sherman, Sandra (2003). "Printed Communities: Domestic Management Texts in the Eighteenth Century". Journal for Early Modern Cultural Studies. 3 (2): 36–67. doi:10.1353/jem.2003.0011.
- Steedman, Carolyn (September 2005). "Poetical Maids and Cooks Who Wrote". Eighteenth-Century Studies. 39 (1): 1–27. doi:10.1353/ecs.2005.0053.

==== Newspaper advertisements ====
- "Advertisement". The Leeds Intelligencer. 3 February 1756. p. 3.
- "Advertisement". The Manchester Mercury. 13 January 1756. p. 3.
- "Advertisement". The Oxford Journal. 3 January 1756. p. 3.
- "Advertisement". The Oxford Journal. 10 January 1756. p. 3.
- "Advertisement". The Oxford Journal. 17 February 1759. p. 4.
- "Advertisement". The Sussex Advertiser. 19 July 1756. p. 3.

==== Websites ====
- Clark, Gregory (2023). "The Annual RPI and Average Earnings for Britain, 1209 to Present (New Series)". MeasuringWorth. Archived from the original on 1 April 2023.
- Lehmann, Gilly (2004). "Bradley, Martha (fl. 1740s–1755)". Oxford Dictionary of National Biography (online ed.). Oxford University Press. doi:10.1093/ref:odnb/50433. (Subscription, Wikipedia Library access or UK public library membership required.)
