= Charles Elmé Francatelli =

British cook and author (1805–1876)

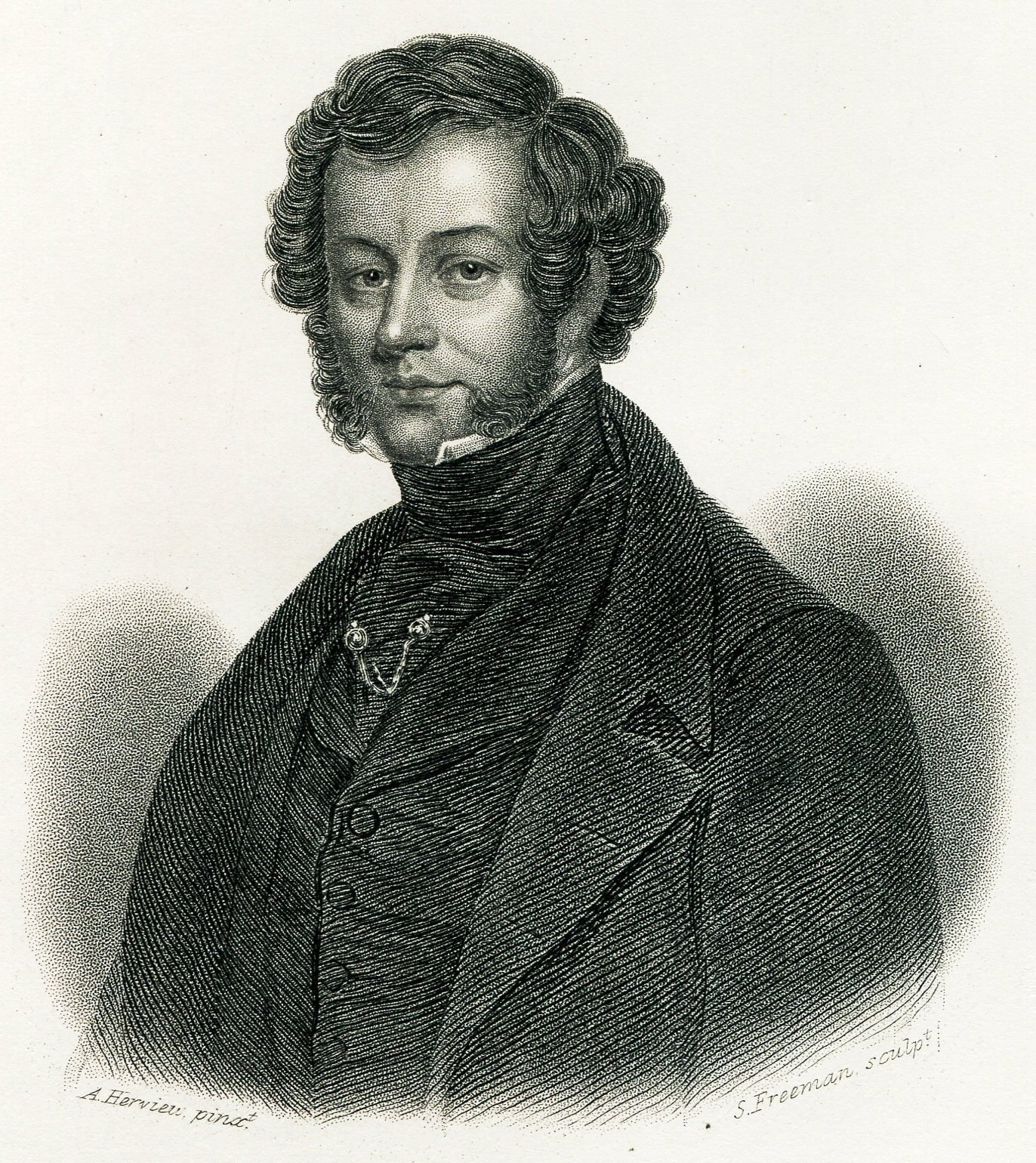
- Francatelli in 1846: frontispiece to The Modern Cook
- Born: 1805; London, England
- Died: 10 August 1876 (aged 70–71); Eastbourne, England
- Occupations: Chef, author
- Notable work: The Modern Cook (1846); A Plain Cookery Book for the Working Classes (1852); The Cook's Guide (1861); The Royal English and Foreign Confectioner (1862)

Charles Elmé Francatelli (1805 – 10 August 1876) was a British chef, known for four cookery books popular in the Victorian era, including The Modern Cook. He trained in Paris under Antonin Carême and became one of London's best-known chefs, succeeding Louis Eustache Ude at Crockford's Club and following Alexis Soyer at the Reform Club. In the early 1840s he was head chef to Queen Victoria. In addition to cooking for the upper classes, Francatelli tried to help the poorer members of society to feed their families, and he published A Plain Cookery Book for the Working Classes in 1852, containing recipes with inexpensive ingredients.

== Life and career ==
Francatelli was born in London in 1805, the son of Nicholas Francatelli, a steward. Although of Italian descent, he regarded himself as an Englishman. He trained in Paris under Antonin Carême, the founder of French haute cuisine, before returning to England. French cuisine was becoming fashionable there and he was appointed chef de cuisine to the Earl of Chesterfield, after which he worked in the same capacity for the Earl of Dudley, Lord Kinnaird and Rowland Errington.

In 1838 Francatelli switched from aristocratic households to a gentlemen's club, Crockford's in St James's, in succession to Louis Eustache Ude, as maître d'hotel. He left Crockford's to become chief cook to Queen Victoria from 9 March 1840. He had a staff of two "Yeomen of the Kitchen" – deputy chefs – and twenty-four subordinate cooks. That engagement lasted until 31 March 1842; accounts differ about his reason for leaving the Queen's service: one suggestion is that the royal family preferred "plain food", as opposed to the elaborate multi-course dinners he prepared; another is that he quarrelled violently with a senior member of the Queen's staff, a third is that he thought himself underpaid and hated the foul-smelling, ill-ventilated kitchens at Buckingham Palace, which were in need of modernisation. Francatelli published his first cookery book, The Modern Cook, in 1846, announcing himself on the title page as "Pupil of the celebrated Carême and late Maître d'Hotel and Chief Cook to Her Majesty the Queen". In his preface he wrote:

we possess in England a greater abundance of all kinds of food, generally of far better quality than is to be found elsewhere [but] our cookery in theory and practice has become a by-word of ridicule, and [we are] compelled to have recourse to foreigners, ignorant for the most part of our tastes and habits, to prepare our feasts. They manage these things better in France.

The first edition was more than 500 pages long and contained recipes not only for English and French dishes but also for American, German, Indian and Italian ones. There were 23 further editions published during Francatelli's lifetime. His additions and revisions took the page-count to 560 in the edition published shortly after his death.

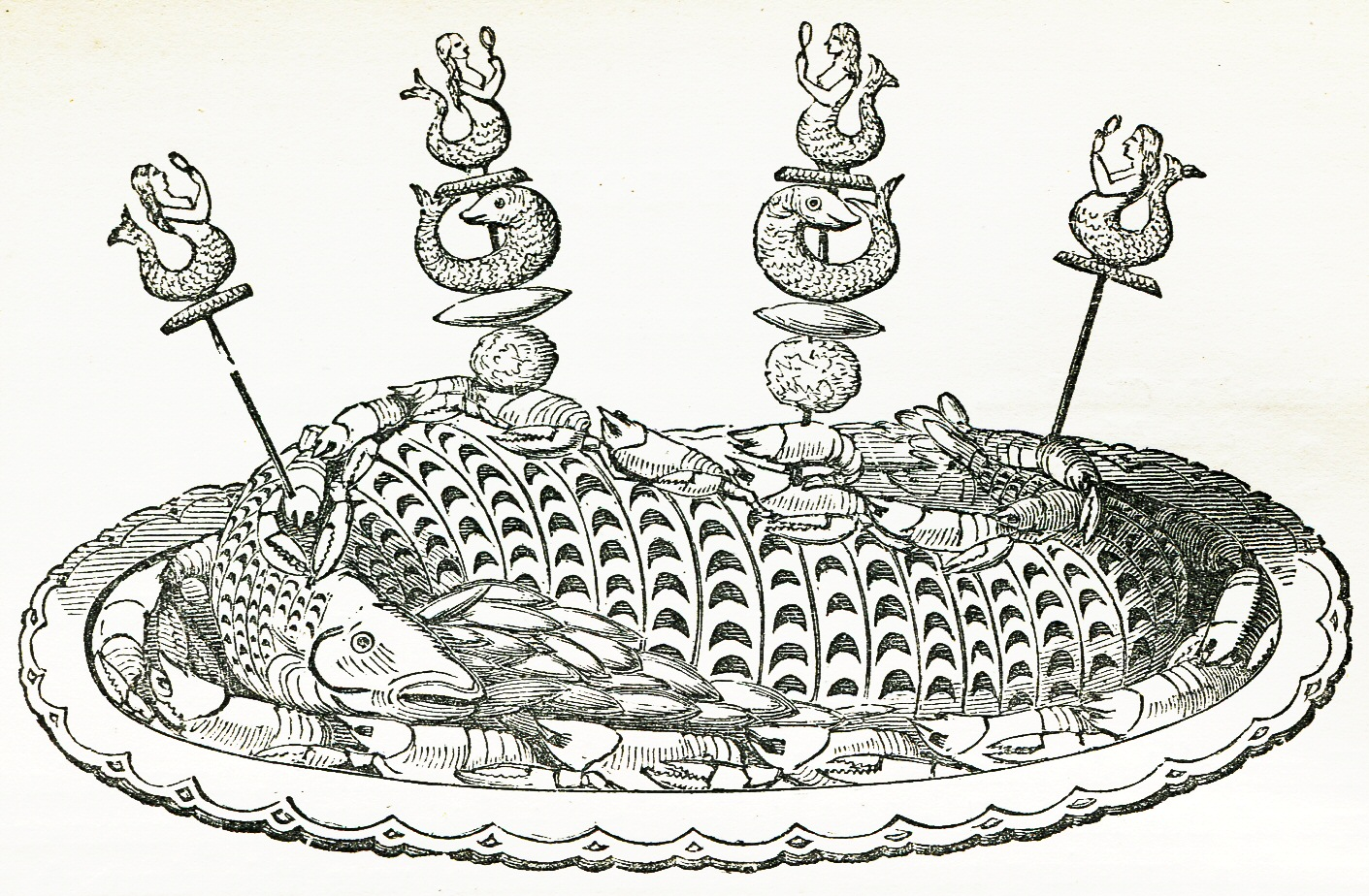
"Salmon à la Chambord", a decorated serving-dish from The Modern Cook

After leaving the royal service Francatelli returned to Crockfords and remained there until it closed on 1 January 1846. Later in that year he accepted the post of chef de cuisine at the new Coventry House Club in Piccadilly. He was noted for what one member called his "incomparable cuisine" there, but after one of the founders died and another went bankrupt and fled to France, the club foundered and in March 1854 it closed. Following the example of another famous chef, Alexis Soyer, who had published The Poor Man's Regenerator in 1847, Francatelli brought out A Plain Cookery Book for the Working Classes in 1852. It contained recipes for economical dishes such as cow-heel broth, ox-cheek soup, sheep's pluck, and bullock's heart – stuffed or baked – as well as instructions for making large quantities of nourishing soups suitable for serving to the needy, using cheap offcuts of meat and, in coastal locations, inexpensive fish.

Francatelli moved to the Reform Club in 1854. The head chef there from 1837 to 1850 had been Alexis Soyer, who set famously high standards, but Francatelli was considered by some to surpass his predecessor: The Morning Advertiser printed an article that stated, "Soyer is now replaced by Francatelli from the Coventry, incomparably his superior, and the most superior chef de cuisine now extant". Soyer and Francatelli, though rivals, maintained a cordial relationship, although Francatelli criticised Soyer's Modern Domestic Cookery in the preface to his third book, The Cook's Guide (1861).

After seven years at the Reform, ending when he quarrelled with the club's committee in 1861, Francatelli took charge of the kitchens of the St James's Hotel, at the corner of Berkeley Street and Piccadilly, from 1863 to 1870, and was concurrently chef de cuisine to the Prince and Princess of Wales at the nearby Marlborough House from early 1863 until at least late September 1866. From 1870 to 1876 he was manager of the Freemasons' Tavern.

In August 1870 Francatelli married Elizabeth Cooke, daughter of William Cooke, a hotel keeper. He died on 10 August 1876 at 1 Cavendish Place, Eastbourne, Sussex.

== Works ==
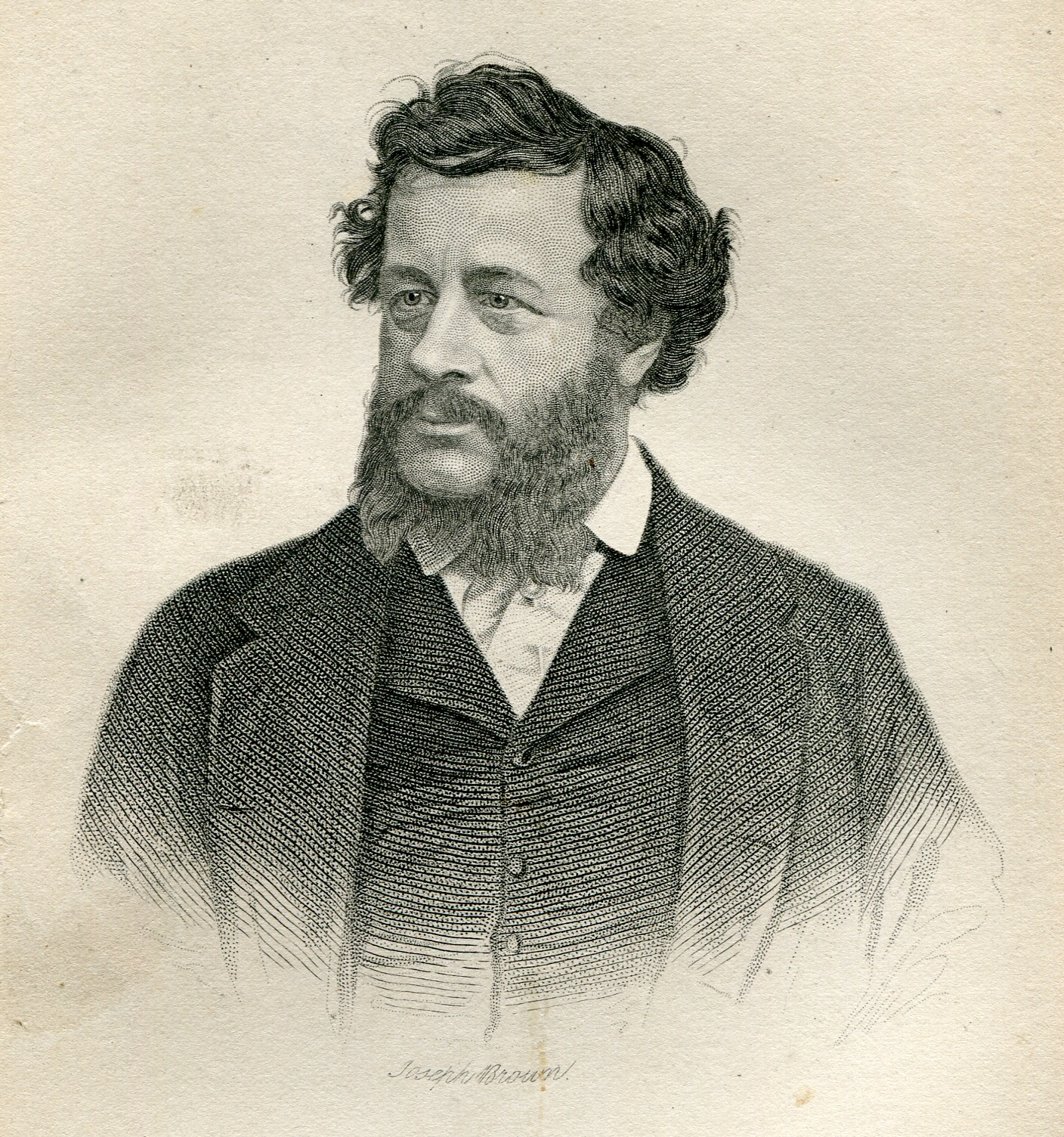
Portrait of Francatelli by Joseph Brown, 1861 – frontispiece to The Cook's Guide

- The Modern Cook (1846).
- A Plain Cookery Book for the Working Classes (1852).
- The Cook's Guide and Housekeeper's & Butler's Assistant (1861).
- The Royal English and Foreign Confectioner (1862).

== Reception ==
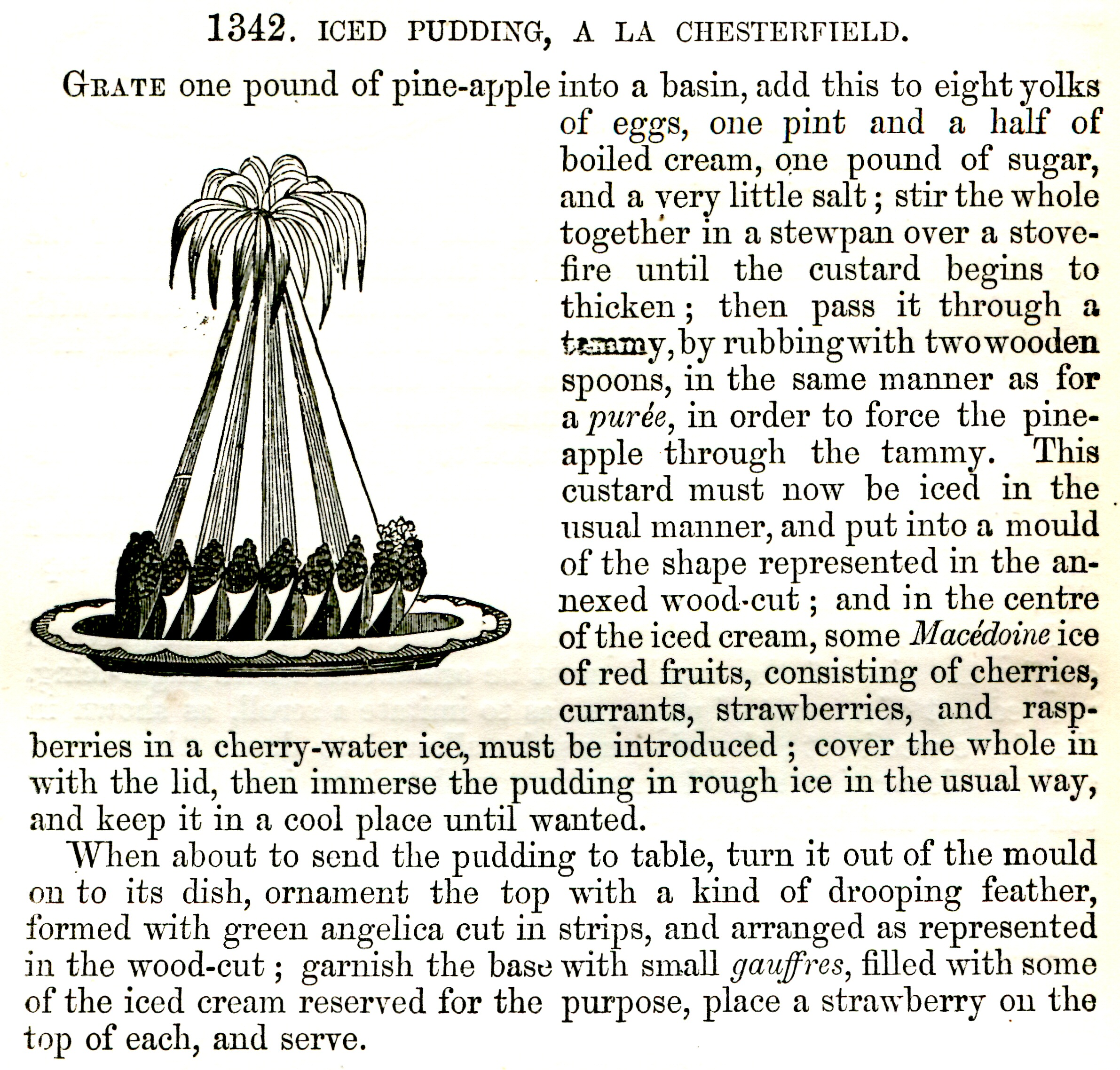
Iced Pudding, à la Chesterfield. The illustration is one of the earliest to show ice cream cones, which Francatelli describes as gauffres.

Reviewing The Cook's Guide in 1861, The Times called it "an admirable manual for every household where pleasure, health, and economy are consulted. He has imparted all that can be imparted of his personal excellence". The obituarist in The Daily Telegraph acknowledged that Francatelli taught "plain and cheap cookery to the middle and humble classes" but added that in his own cooking he was inclined to excessive lavishness and "truffled his dishes not wisely but too well". Nonetheless, the obituarist commented that Francatelli's death left a gap unlikely to be quickly or easily filled.

The New York Times in 1881 found Francatelli's literary style a touch pompous, but had no reservations about the content of his books: "We are forced to respect him as an artist. Francatelli was no make-shift: he had deeply studied his profession and with him cooking was the greatest of all the arts. With Francatelli you were quite safe did you invite the Queen, all the monarchs of Europe, with their respective Cabinets to dine with you. ... Francatelli's book is a culinary monument. It is delightful to look through his menus for every month in the year."

Elizabeth David, writing in 1985, describes Francatelli as "one of the most respected chefs in Britain"; Clarissa Dickson Wright, calling Francatelli "the Italian confectioner", describes him as liking elaborate sugar decorations, making "pearls, birds and feathers out of sugar to decorate your dessert course", and comments that although such fiddly decoration may have looked good, she was not sure it did anything for the taste.

Henry Notaker in his 2017 A History of Cookbooks writes that Francatelli adopted a different tone depending on his target audience. In The Modern Cook, aimed at an upper-class readership, his instructions are phrased more ceremoniously than those in Plain Cookery for the Working Classes, where, in Notaker's view, he adopted "a more direct and slightly patronizing voice". Notaker also comments that Francatelli, unusually for the time, addresses his readers directly, mentioning himself, as in "this is the way I recommend that it be cooked".

In a 2006 biographical essay on Francatelli, Mary Ellen Snodgrass calls him "Victorian England’s most famous chef ... able to commiserate with the struggles of the poor to feed their families". William Sitwell, writing for The Daily Telegraph in May 2024, referred to A Plain Cookery Book for the Working Classes as "the most revolting cookbook of all time".

== In popular culture ==
Francatelli's time as royal chef was fictionalised in the British television series, Victoria (2016-2019). Ferdinand Kingsley played Francatelli. The series depicts him as staying in the Queen's service for over a decade, when in reality this occupation lasted only two years.

== Notes, references and sources ==
=== Sources ===
- Berriedale-Johnson, Michelle (1989). The Victorian Cookbook. London: Ward Lock. ISBN 0-70-637035-X.
- Cowen, Ruth (2006). Relish: The Extraordinary Life of Alexis Soyer, Victorian Celebrity Chef. London: Weidenfeld and Nicolson. ISBN 978-0-297-64562-7.
- David, Elizabeth (2001) [2000]. Jill Norman (ed.). Is There a Nutmeg in the House?. London: Penguin. ISBN 978-0-14-029290-9.
- Dickson Wright, Clarissa (2011). A History of English Food. Random House. ISBN 978-1-905-21185-2.
- Francatelli, Charles Elmé (1846). The Modern Cook (1st ed.). London: Richard Bentley. OCLC 265546710.
- Francatelli, Charles Elmé (1862). The Cook's Guide (2nd ed.). London: Richard Bentley. OCLC 969522048.
- Francatelli, Charles Elmé (1877). The Modern Cook (27th ed.). London: Richard Bentley. OCLC 20273144.
- Francatelli, Charles Elmé (2007) [1852]. A Plain Cookery Book for the Working Classes. Stroud: Tempus. ISBN 978-0-75-244289-1.
- Gregory, William (1894). Autobiography. London: John Murray. OCLC 499317067.
- Notaker, Henry (2017). A History of Cookbooks. Oakland: University of California Press. ISBN 978-0-52-029400-4.
- Snodgrass, Mary Ellen (2006). "Charles Elmé Francatelli". In Alice Arndt (ed.). Culinary Biographies. Houston: Yes Press. OCLC 1193399534.
