= Louis Eustache Ude =

French chef and writer (1768–1846)

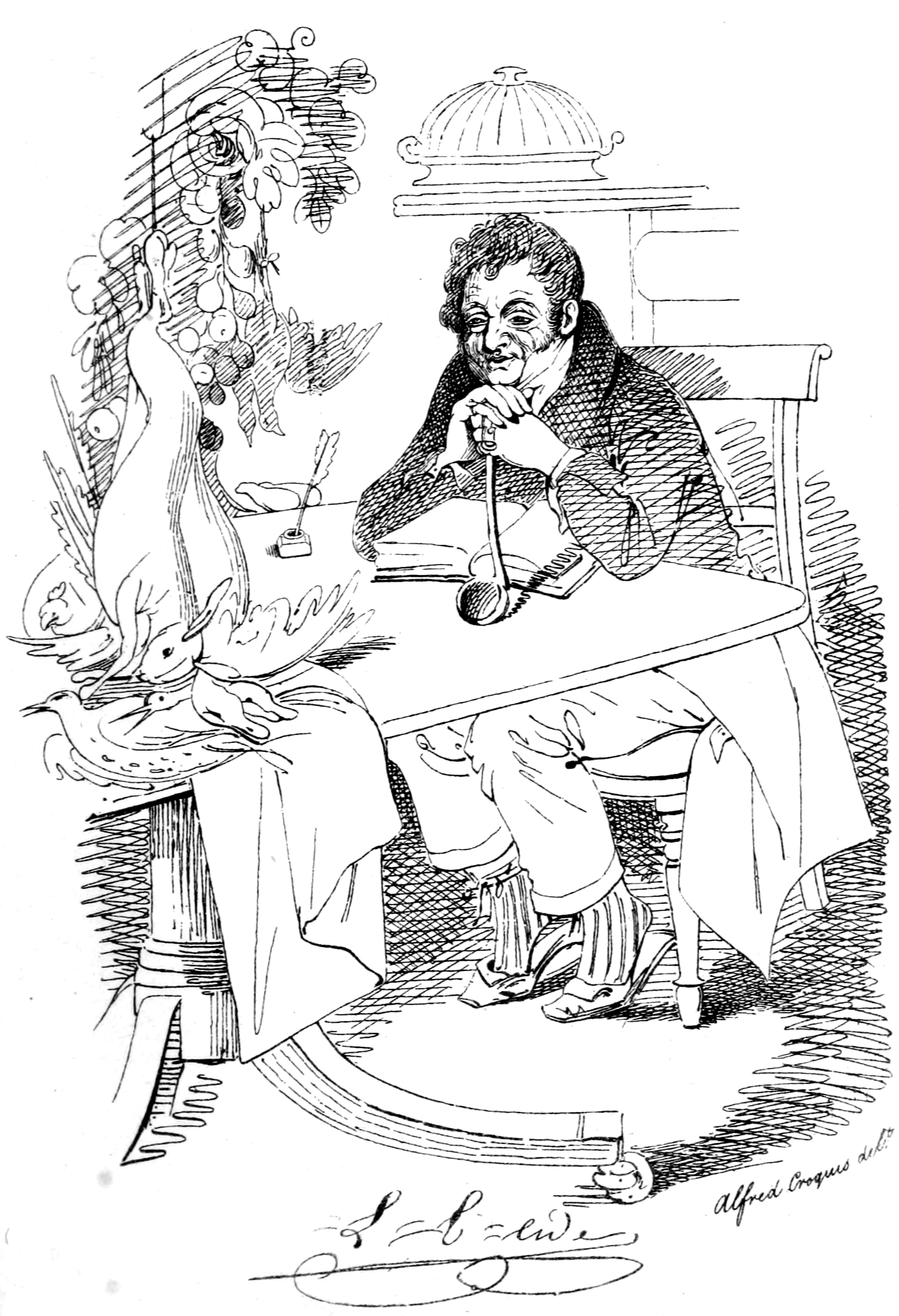
Louis-Eustache Ude

Louis Eustache Ude (c. 1768 – 10 April 1846) was a French chef and writer who spent the majority of his culinary career in England. The best known French cook in Britain before Alexis Soyer, he was the author of an influential cookbook, The French Cook, first published in 1813 with thirteen new editions being written over the next three decades. After leaving an apprenticeship in the kitchens at the Palace of Versailles, Ude is thought to have tried numerous other occupations before returning to cooking and rising to the top of the profession. He eventually moved to England, where Ude was credited with introducing haute cuisine to the country. His clients included members of the British nobility, royal family and gentlemen's clubs.

== Early life ==
Ude was born in France c. 1768. Little is known for certain about his early years. In a biographical sketch written in 1835 Abraham Hayward stated that Ude's mother was a milliner, who married a member of the kitchen staff at the Palace of Versailles. According to this account Ude joined his father in the royal kitchens (he later described himself as "former cook to Louis XVI") but left to become apprenticed to, successively, a cheap jeweller, an engraver, a printer and a haberdasher, after which he became traveller for a merchant in Lyon. After returning to Paris he was for a short while an actor in a small theatre, and then worked unsuccessfully in finance and the civil service. By some accounts Ude fled France during the Reign of Terror. According to Hayward, and to Joseph Favre in the Dictionnaire universel de cuisine (1892), he remained in France throughout the revolution, returned to cooking and rose to become chef d'hôtel for Letitia Bonaparte, the mother of Napoleon. Hayward wrote:

Here our artist remained for about two years, when, owing to some difference of opinion between Madame Letitia and himself in matters arithmetical, he somewhat suddenly left that lady's service to honour our land with his presence.

== Career in England ==
Ude's history after he moved to England is more consistently attested, although precise dates are mostly lacking. Despite the impression conveyed by Favre that a French chef in London was something new, Ude was in fact following a centuries-old tradition of French cooks working for the rich and powerful of London. He became chef to William Molyneux, 2nd Earl of Sefton, of Arlington Street off Piccadilly and Croxteth Hall in Lancashire. Favre describes Sefton as "this wealthy lord, who was known as the king of English Epicureans". Sefton paid Ude well: his salary was £300 a year, according to Hayward. (Note: In terms of 2020 earnings this equates to more than £250,000 a year, according to MeasuringWorth.) When Sefton died in 1838 he left Ude an annuity of £100, though the chef had not by then worked for him for more than twenty years.

While working for Sefton, Ude published the first edition of The French Cook, in 1813. Favre calls it the first cookery book to be published in London, which, as the Oxford Dictionary of National Biography (ODNB) observes, is untrue, (Note: In a survey of English cookery books, Arnold Whitaker Oxford lists more than two hundred published in Britain – mostly in London – before Ude's, beginning with The Boke of Cokery in 1500, and including books by Robert May, Hannah Glasse, Maria Rundell, and Eliza Acton. Favre could not even say truthfully that Ude's was the first French cookery book published in London: works by François Pierre La Varenne and Marie-Antoine Carême, among others, had been issued in English translations.) but the ODNB finds some truth in Favre's statement that Ude was among the first to popularise haute cuisine in England. The book was a considerable success and went through fourteen editions over the next three decades, making the author a large amount of money. By the time of his death it was regarded as "the standard work in the science of cookery". Its fame spread beyond kitchens. Lord Byron drew on it extensively for a description of a banquet in Don Juan.

Between the publication of the third edition of the book, in 1815, and that of the fourth, in 1816, Ude left Sefton's employment. (Note: On the title page of the former he describes himself as "Formerly cook to Louis XVI, King of France, and at present cook to the Right Hon. Earl of Sefton", and on that of the latter as "Formerly cook to Louis XVI, King of France, and at present Steward to the United Service Club".) (There is a story that he resigned because a guest added more pepper to his soup.) After leaving Sefton, Ude became steward to the United Service Club, where "his dinners were acknowledged to be better than any other Club could boast", according to the historian Arthur Humphreys. By the time of the fifth edition of The French Cook (1818) Ude had left the club. In 1821 he married (Camille) Barbe Lucot at St George's, Hanover Square.

At some point between 1818 and 1826 Ude became steward to Frederick Augustus, Duke of York, George III's second son. (Note: In the eighth edition of The French Cook (1827) Ude is identified as "Steward to His Royal Highness the Duke of York"; in the ninth edition (also 1827) the text is changed to "... His Royal Highness the late Duke of York".) Following the death of the duke in 1827 Ude became chef at Crockford's gambling club. The Standard reported on 25 October 1827:

Mr Ude, of culinary celebrity, is engaged by Mr Crockford, to superintend the cuisine of his vast establishment, at a salary of twelve hundred pounds a year. Mr Ude is fitting up a house for his own family contiguous to the scene of his official duties, in Albemarle Street.

£1,200 a year was an enormous sum in the 1820s – the equivalent of more than £1m in terms of 2020 incomes – although from it Ude had to pay all his assistant chefs and kitchen staff. The ODNB comments, "At a time when club food consisted chiefly of boiled fowl, mutton, and roast beef, Ude's more refined cooking put Crockford's on the culinary map". Thomas Crofton Croker wrote in 1829 of "the classic Cuisine of Ude ... Ude's fame is boundless as is his talent. Does not London resound ... with the celebrity of this Professor of the culinary art?" The London Review praised Ude's banquets as "quasi-Elysian". The ODNB gives examples of Ude's famous creations: "an entrée of soft roes of mackerel baked in butter and served with a cream sauce" and "a most delicious sweet made with fresh stoned cherries, and which he christened Boudin de cerises à la Bentinck".

== Later years and death ==
In 1838 Ude parted company with the club. Benjamin Disraeli wrote to his sister, "There has been a row at Crockford's, and Ude dismissed. He told the committee he was worth £4,000 a year. Their new man is quite a failure, so I think the great artist may yet return from Elba." The new man, Charles Elmé Francatelli, was in fact a success, and Ude did not return. In retirement he was financially well off, but bored and miserable. A friend asked him why he did not busy himself in his own kitchen, but he replied, "Bah! I have not been into my kitchen once: I hate the sight of my kitchen. I dine on roast mutton dressed by a cookmaid". He was indignant about his treatment by Crockford's but admitted, "Ah, I love that Club, though they are ingrats".

Among Ude's friends in his later years was his successor as London's most famous French chef, Alexis Soyer, whom Ude liked as a man and approved of as a chef. At Soyer's wedding in 1837, Ude was one of the two witnesses. He continued to live in London until his death of fever at his house in Albemarle Street on 10 April 1846 at an age variously reported as 76, 77 and 78. After a Solemn mass at the French chapel in Little George Street he was buried in Kensal Green cemetery. His widow lived until 1862.

== The French Cook ==
The contents of the book varied from edition to edition. In the first (1813), Ude contends in a brief introduction that "The works hitherto published on the Art of Cookery are unintelligible, and the receipts (Note: Receipt is an old word for "recipe"; the Oxford English Dictionary describes it as "now historical"; its most recent citation is from 1993."receipt". Oxford English Dictionary (Online ed.). Oxford University Press. (Subscription or participating institution membership required.)) therein indicated impracticable". He makes it clear from the outset that he is writing about grand cuisine. An example he gives of a typical dinner menu consists of:

Course	Dish	Translation
First course	Le potage printannier	Spring vegetable soup
	Les tranches de cabilleau, sauce aux huitres	Slices of cod with oyster sauce
Relevés (Note: OED: "In French cookery: a dish or course brought in to replace one that has been removed. Now chiefly historical".)	Le poulard à la Montmorencie	Chicken in sour cherry sauce
	Le jambon de Westphalie, à l'essence	Westphalia ham in white wine and mushroom sauce
Entrées	La fricassé de poulets aux champignons	Chicken fricassee with mushrooms
	Les cotelettes d'agneau sautés, sauce à la macédoine	Sauteed lamb chop with sauce of diced vegetables
	Le sauté de filets de poulets gras, au suprême	Sauteed breasts of plump chickens, off the bone
	Les tendrons de veau glacés aux laitues, à l'essence	Tendrons (Note: In French butchery the tendrons are from the middle of the underside of the animal, between the breast to the front and the flank to the rear.) of glazed veal with lettuce and white wine sauce
Dishes de rôt (roasts)	Le chapon	Capon
	Les cailles	Quails
Entremets (Note: OED: "A side dish – one served before or alongside the roast meat in the main course of a meal")	Les pois à la française	Peas cooked with lettuce and baby onions
	La gelée de fraises	Strawberry jelly
	Les asperges en bâtonets	Asparagus spears
	Les puits d'amour garnis de marmalade	Puff pastry cases filled with marmalade
Remove (Note: OED: "A dish that is served during a course in place of one that is removed. Now chiefly historical".)	La tart de groseilles rouges	Redcurrant tart
	Le soufflé au citron	Lemon soufflé

The above is one of the simplest of his menus.

Ude took care with his prose, and either coined or popularised the maxim Coquus nascitur non fit— "cooks are born, not made". In The French Cook he observed, "It is very remarkable that in France, where there is but one religion, the sauces are infinitely varied, whilst in England, where the different sects are innumerable, there is, we may say, but one single sauce". To Ude, sauces were "the soul of cookery".

Although Ude considered that when English cooking was done well it was unsurpassable, he deplored some aspects of the English attitude to dining. He condemned the unremitting hostility of England's doctors to good eating, and the indifference of its women to haute cuisine:

The ladies of England are unfavourably disposed to our art; yet I find no difficulty in assigning the cause of it. It is particularly the case with them (and indeed it is so in some measure with our own sex) that they are not introduced to their parents' table till their palates have been completely benumbed by the strict diet observed in the nursery and boarding-school.

E. Cobham Brewer, calling Ude "the most learned of cooks", attributed to him the authorship of a book called La Science de Gueule ("The Science of the Mouth"). No such book is listed in WorldCat or mentioned in the ODNB or obituaries of Ude.

== Notes, references and sources ==
=== Sources ===
- Beatty, Bernard (2016). Byron's Don Juan. Taylor and Francis. ISBN 978-1-138-64856-2.
- Brewer, Ebenezer Cobham (1896). Character Sketches of Romance, Fiction and the Drama. New York: Hess. OCLC 1086753166.
- Cowen, Ruth (2006). Relish: The Extraordinary Life of Alexis Soyer, Victorian Celebrity Chef. London: Weidenfeld and Nicolson. ISBN 978-0-297-64562-7.
- Croker, Thomas Crofton (1829). Legends of the Lakes. London: Ebers. OCLC 871724599.
- Favre, Joseph (1892). Dictionnaire universel de cuisine pratique. Paris: Favre. OCLC 1348890867.
- Hayward, Abraham (1852). The Art of Dining, Or, Gastronomy and Gastronomers. London: Murray. OCLC 556952912.
- Humphreys, Arthur (1953). Crockford's, or, The Goddess of Chance in St. James's Street, 1828–1844. London: Hutchinson. OCLC 3145494.
- Jane, Tom (2006). "Nursery food". In Alan Davidson (ed.). The Oxford Companion to Food (second ed.). Oxford: Oxford University Press. ISBN 978-0-19-280681-9.
- Mars, Valerie (2013). "Experiencing French cookery in Nineteenth-century London". In Kelly, Debra; Martyn Cornick (eds.). A History of the French in London. London: University of London Press. pp. 217–240. ISBN 978-1-909646-48-3. JSTOR j.ctv512xmz.18.
- Monypenny, William (1912). The Life of Benjamin Disraeli, Volume 2. London: John Murray. OCLC 639994602.
- Oxford, Arnold Whitaker (1913). English Cookery Books to the Year 1850. London: Oxford University Press. OCLC 163481643.
- Ude, Louis-Eustache (1813). The French Cook (first ed.). London: Ebers. OCLC 1042832199.
  - — (1815). The French Cook (third ed.). London: Ebers. OCLC 27417309.
  - — (1816). The French Cook (fourth ed.). London: Ebers. OCLC 46643737.
  - — (1827). The French Cook (eighth ed.). London: Ainsworth. OCLC 1017373056.
  - — (1827). The French Cook (ninth ed.). London: Ainsworth. OCLC 504810227.
  - — (1829). The French Cook (tenth ed.). London: Ainsworth. ISBN 978-0-668-04381-6. OCLC 504810234.
