= Hot pot (disambiguation) =

Hot pot is a dish or style of cooking from China, Taiwan, and southeast Asia.

Hot pot may also refer to:

- Jeongol, a Korean hot pot
- Karelian hot pot
- Lancashire hotpot, a traditional English stew of meat, potatoes and vegetables
- Nabemono, a Japanese hot pot
- Shabu-shabu, a Japanese dish in the hot pot style
- Hodge-Podge (soup)
- Hot Pot Music, a record label
- Everybody Speaks Nonsenses II – Hot Pot, a Taiwanese TV show
- A brand of electric kettle
- For the style of "hot pot" cooking that uses a clay pot, see Clay pot cooking
- “Hot potting”, the practice of soaking in natural hot springs
