= Joseph Brown (engraver) =

English engraver

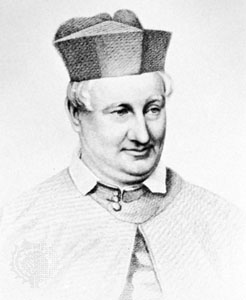
Frederick William Faber, engraved by Joseph Brown

Joseph Brown (1809–1887) was an English engraver.

== Life ==
Brown was born in 1809. He first exhibited at the Royal Academy in London in 1833. He is known for his many engravings using both stipple and line, working from paintings by the artists George Romney, John Opie, J. Robson, George Perfect Harding and John Hayter. Many of his works are portraits of titled aristocrats.

== Works ==
- Engravings at the National Portrait Gallery, London (167 works)
- Engravings at the Science Museum, London (2 works, Ada Lovelace and William Herschel)
