= Henry Notaker =

Norwegian journalist

- Born: 15 July 1941 (age 84); Halden, Norway
- Occupation: Journalist

Henry Notaker (born 15 July 1941) is a Norwegian journalist.

He was born in Halden. He graduated as cand.philol. from the University of Oslo, worked as journalist for the newspaper Aftenposten, and for the Norwegian Broadcasting Corporation from 1970 to 2004. From 1976 to 1979 he was a foreign correspondent in Paris. Among his books are Revolusjon i Portugal from 1975, Cæsars barnebarn from 1982, and Appetittleksikon from 1997.
