= Francesco Bartolozzi =

Italian artist

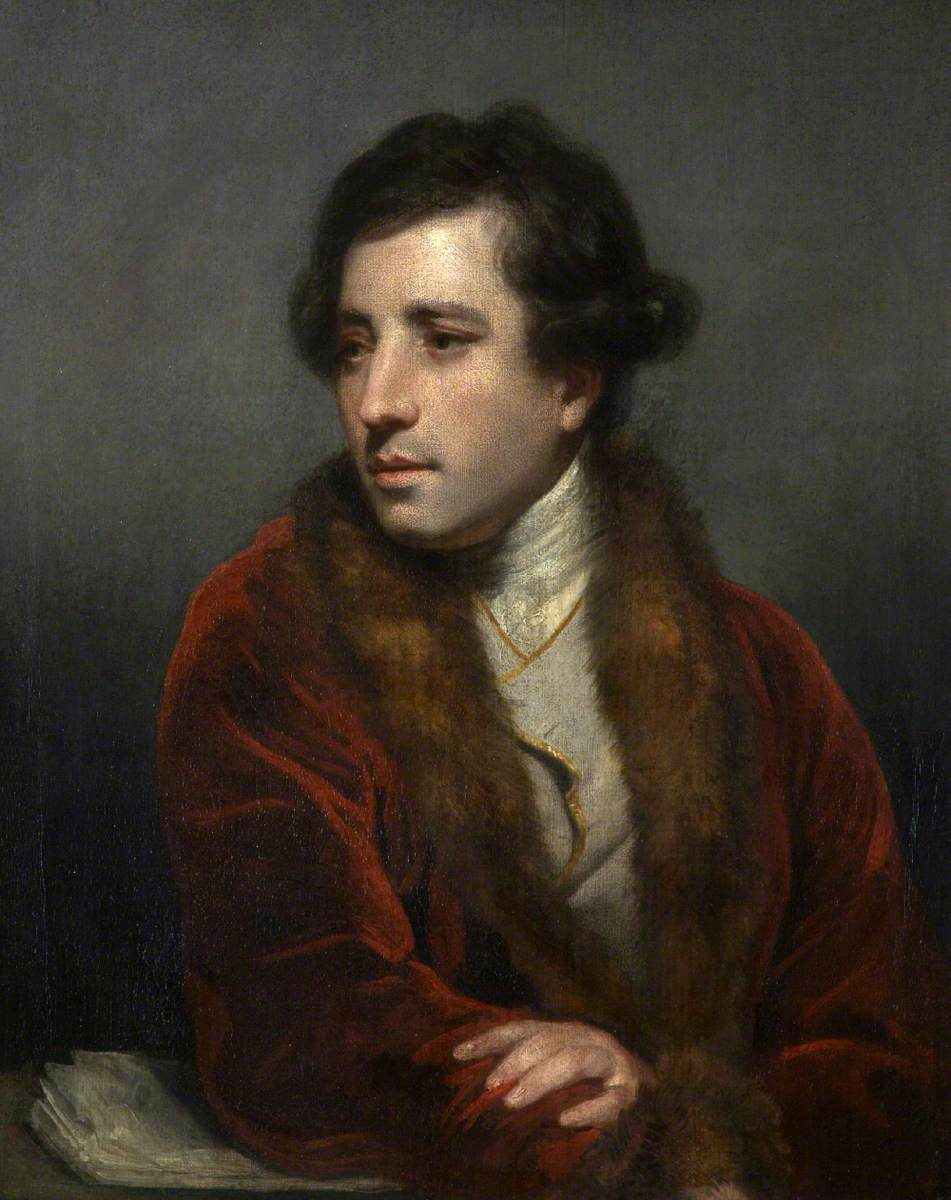
- Portrait of Francesco Bartolozzi by Sir Joshua Reynolds, 1773
- Born: 21 September 1727; Florence, Grand Duchy of Tuscany
- Died: 7 March 1815 (aged 87); Lisbon, Kingdom of Portugal
- Education: Ignazio Hugford and Giovanni Domenico Ferretti
- Known for: Engraving

Francesco Bartolozzi RA (21 September 1727 – 7 March 1815) was an Italian engraver, whose most productive period was spent in London. He is noted for popularizing the "crayon" method of engraving.

== Early life ==
Bartolozzi was born in Florence in 1727. He was originally destined to follow the profession of his father, a gold- and silver-smith, but he manifested so much skill and taste in designing that he was placed under the supervision of two Florentine artists, Ignazio Hugford and Giovanni Domenico Ferretti, who instructed him in painting. After devoting three years to that art, he went to Venice and studied engraving. He spent six years there working for Joseph Wagner, an engraver and printseller, before setting up his own workshop.

== Early career ==
His first productions in Venice were plates in the style of Marco Ricci and Francesco Zuccarelli. He then moved for a short time in 1762 to Rome, where he completed a set of engravings representing frescoes at Grottaferrata by Domenichino depicting the life of St Nilus. Those and his etchings of Old Master's works, began to draw attention throughout Europe. In 1763 he met Richard Dalton, the English Royal Librarian who was traveling in Italy looking for acquisitions for the King's collections. Dalton offered him an appointment as Engraver to the King; Bartolozzi accepted and left for London in 1764.

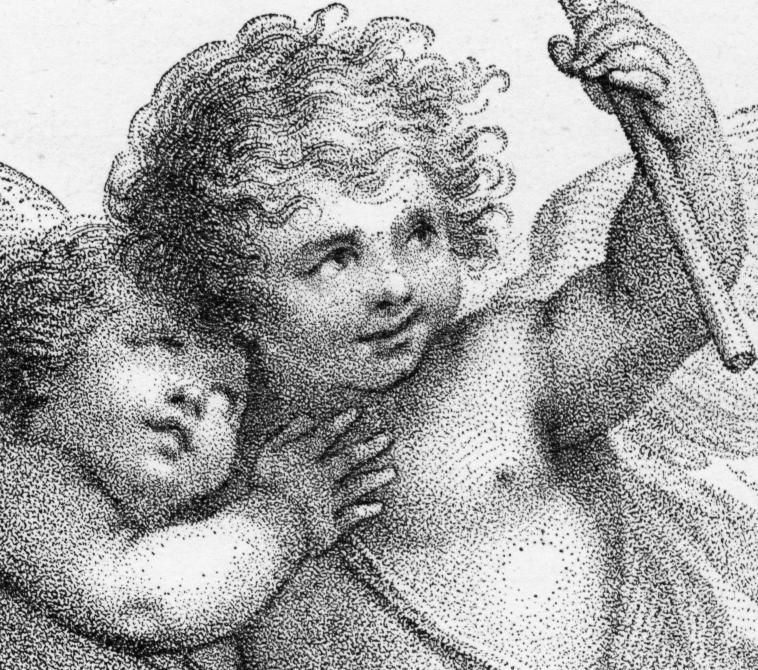
A detail of one of Bartolozzi's prints, showing the tonal effects of the technique of stipple engraving, in which he was an expert.

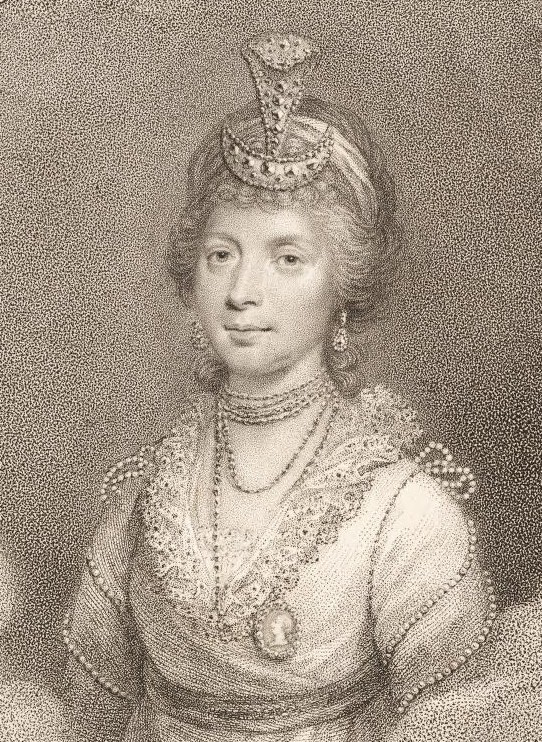
Detail of Queen Charlotte as painted by William Beechey, 1799.

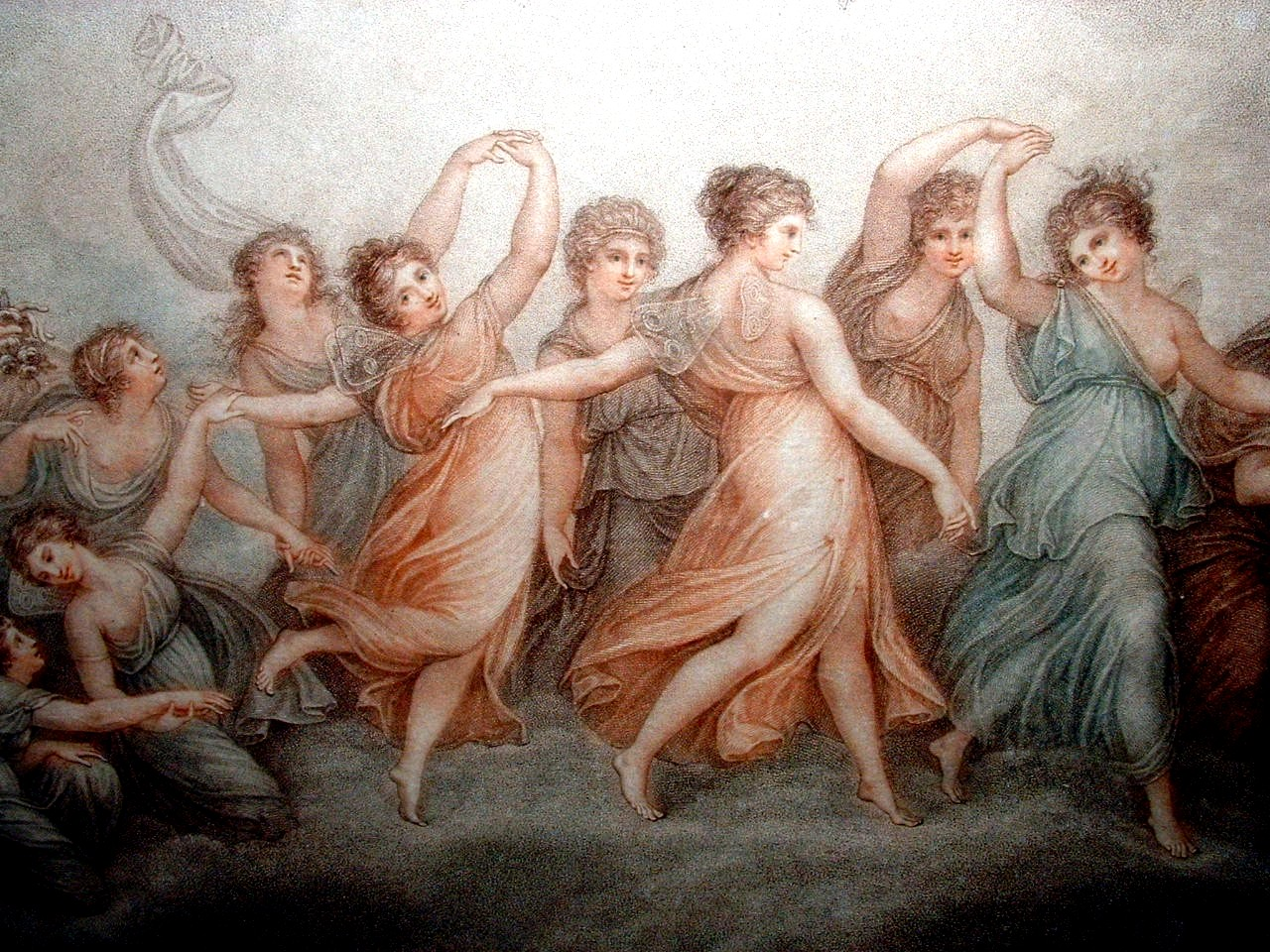
The Hours; after Maria Cosway, 1788.

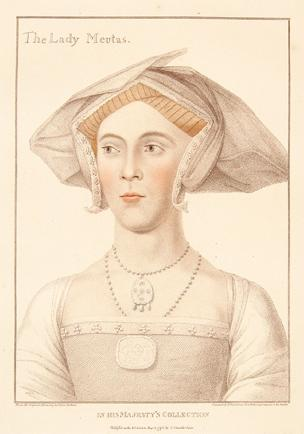
Lady Jane Meutas; after Holbein, 1795.

== Career in London ==
He lived in London for nearly forty years. He produced an enormous number of engravings, including Clytie after Annibale Carracci, and of the Virgin and Child, after Carlo Dolci. A large proportion of them are from the works of Cipriani and Angelica Kauffman. Bartolozzi also contributed a number of plates to Boydell's Shakespeare Gallery. He also drew sketches of his own in red chalk. Soon after arriving in London, he was appointed 'Engraver to the King' (George III) with an annual salary of £300. He was elected a founding member of the Royal Academy. The new Academy's bylaws specifically excluded engravers but Bartolozzi was so well esteemed that he was brought in as an Academician in the category of Painter. In 1802 he became the founding President of the short-lived Society of Engravers.

While Bartolozzi was not the original inventor of the crayon manner of engraving, he became a leading exponent that "stipple" method and it became associated with him. With that technique images are created by delicate dots rather than lines as in traditional etchings or engravings. Bartolozzi added distinction to his work by using red (sanguine), orange and brown inks rather than common black ink.

As his prominence grew, he took on students including Michele Benedetti, Ignatius Joseph van den Berghe, Thomas Cheesman, Lambertus Antonius Claessens, Daniel Gardner, Christiaan Josi, Johan Fredrik Martin, Conrad Martin Metz, Luigi Schiavonetti, John Keyse Sherwin, Heinrich Sintzenich, Peltro William Tomkins, Domenico Bernardo Zilotti, and Gavriil Skorodumov.

His son Gaetano Stefano Bartolozzi, born in 1757, also became an engraver and later fathered Madame Vestris a celebrated English actress, opera singer, and theater manager.

== Career in Lisbon ==
In 1802, Bartolozzi accepted the post of director of the National Academy of Lisbon and moved there with the intention of reforming the royal press and producing an edition of the Portuguese epic poem The Lusiads (Os Lusíadas). By then he was in his seventies and delegated much of the work to one of his students.

Despite his fame and prolific output, debts forced him to sell off most of his prints and possessions. Bartolozzi died in his studio in 1815 and was buried in the common grave of a Lisbon church.

== Works ==
Ticozzi and Bryan both published lists of his output, including:

=== Original etchings ===
- Abraham and the Angels.
- The Miracle of the Manna.
- Job abandoned by his Friends.
- Charity, an oval; inscribed Ipse feci .
- The Origin of Painting (1787).
- The Virgin and Infant; (circular).

=== Etchings after masterworks ===
- St. Francis of Sales triumphs over Heresy; after Ottavio Amiconi.
- St. Luke paints the Portrait of the Virgin; after Cantarini.
- The Adulteress before Christ; after Agostino Carracci.
- Roland and Olympia, Clytie, and other drawings in the Royal Collection after Annibale Carracci.
- A set of eight subjects; after Giovanni Benedetto Castiglione.

==== Etchings after Cipriani ====
- The Parting of Achilles and Briseis.
- Hector takes leave of Andromache.
- Chryseis restored to her Father.
- The Death of Dido.
- Jupiter and Juno on Mount Ida.
- Venus presenting the Cestus to Juno.
- Venus attired by the Graces .
- Tancred and Herminia and Tancred and Clorinda.
- Shakespeare crowned by Immortality.
- Morning for the Death of lord Rufsell.
- The Dukes of Northumberland and Suffolk praying Lady Jane Gray to accept the crown.

==== Engravings after Angelica Kauffman ====
- Socrates in Prison.
- Penelope lamenting Ulysses.
- Telemachus and Mentor in the Isle of Calypso.
- Paulus Emilias educating his Children.
- Coriolanus appeased by his Family
- The Beautiful Rhodope in love with Aesope (1780s, inscription: From an original painting of the same size by Signora Angelica Kauffman. In the possession of Charles Boddam sun Esqv.)
- The four allegories of Design, Colouring, Invention and Composition commissionned for the ceiling of the Royal Academy´s new Council Room in Somerset House which opened in 1780 Somerset House, moved to Burlington House

==== Others ====
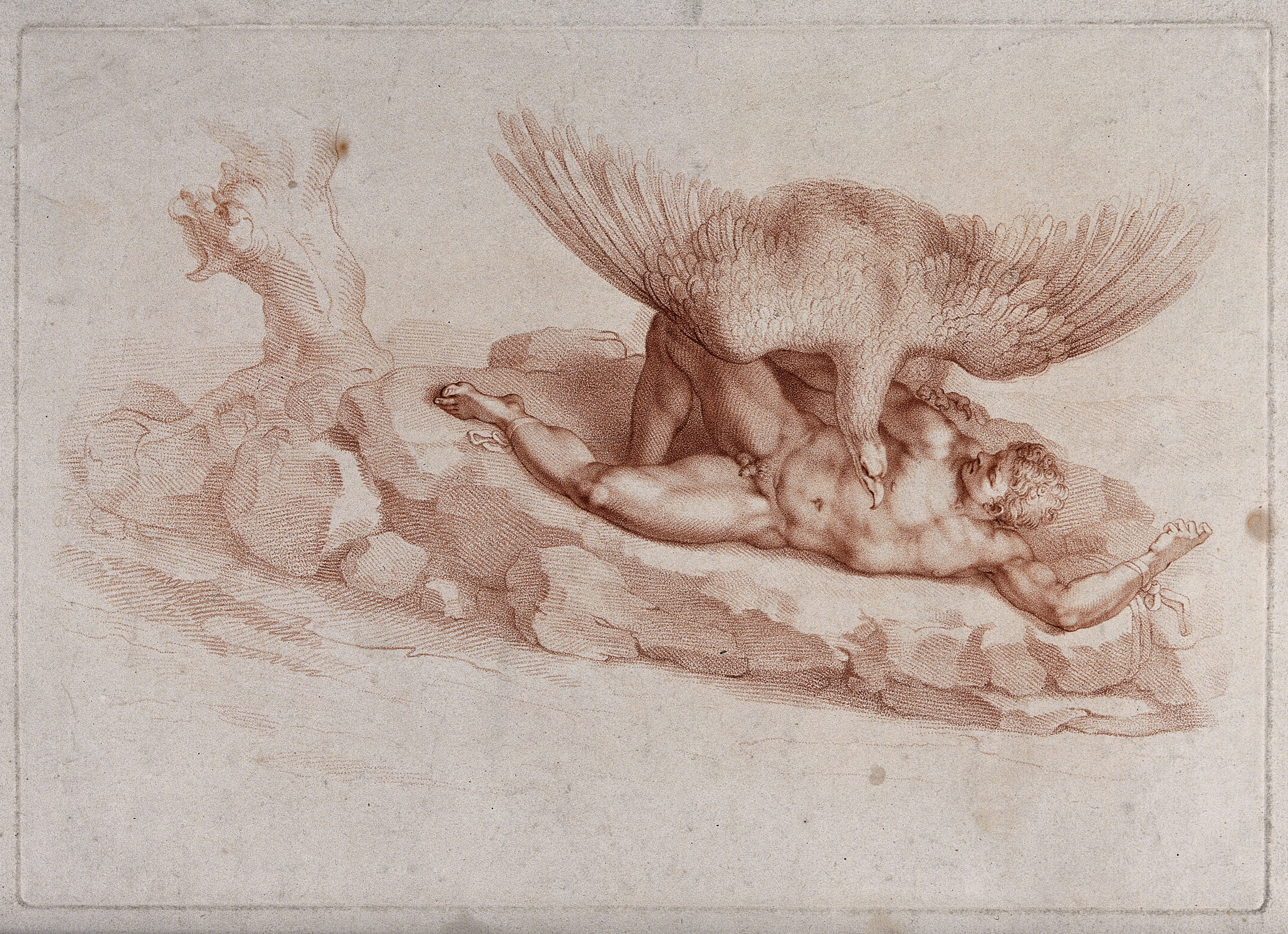
Prometheus’ Liver Devoured by Vulture; after Michelangelo, 1795. (Click for very high resolution image, showing stippling combined with lines.)

- A set of thirteen plates from the frescoes of Domenichino at Grottaferrata.
- A set of 33 drawings by Guercino in the Royal Collection.
- A set of Portraits after Hans Holbein the Younger, including two portraits of Henry and Charles Brandon, sons of Charles Brandon, 1st Duke of Suffolk, Thomas More, Lady Meutas and Lord Mansfield.
- Portraits of Cignani and Pietro da Cortona; after Carlo Maratta.
- Bust of Michelangelo.
- A Collection of Gems, designed by various artists, engraved by Bartolozzi.
- Cornelia, Mother of the Gracchi; after Benjamin West.
- The Death of Lord Chatham; after John Singleton Copley.
- The Fair Moralist and her Pupil; after Richard Cosway.
- The Hours; after Maria Cosway, ('Vide Gray's Ode to Spring').
- The Interview of Edgar and Elfrida after her Marriage with Athelwold.
- King John ratifying Magna Charta; after John Hamilton Mortimer.
- Mary, Queen of Scots, and her Son; after Federico Zuccaro.
- Prometheus’ liver devoured by Vulture; after Michelangelo.
- Rachel Hiding the Idols of Laban and Laocoon attacked by Serpents; after Pietro da Cortona.
- Queen Charlotte; after William Beechey.
- The Virgin and Infant; after Carlo Dolci.
