= Francesco Simonini =

Italian painter (1686–1753)

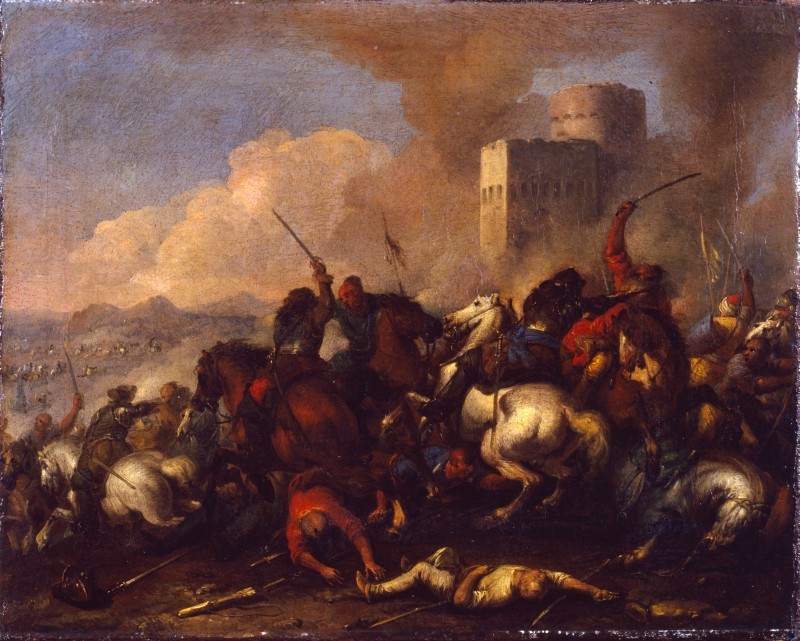
Battle scene, 1716-1717 (Fondazione Cariplo)

Francesco Simonini (Parma, June 16, 1686 – Venice or Florence, after 1753) was an Italian painter.

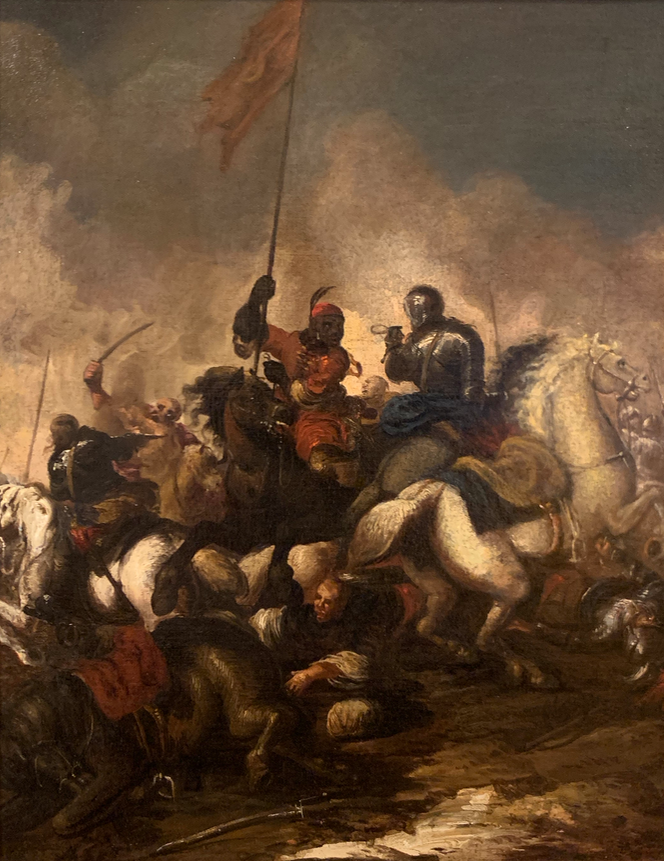
Turkish battle scene, XVIII century

== Biography ==
Born in Parma, Simonini was trained at the school of Francesco Monti (known as Brescianino delle Battaglie for his battle scenes) under the guidance of his fellow pupil Ilario Spolverini. Crucial importance attaches in this connection to a trip to Florence, where he studied the works of Jacques Courtois, known as Borgognone, in great depth and made some copies of them. He also visited Rome and Bologna but found success in Venice With the help of his great friend Domenico Bernardo Zilotti, where he worked for Johann Matthias von der Schulenburg, mercenary commander of the Venetian forces in the struggle against the Turks, from 1733 to 1745 and painted a great number of battle scenes involving cavalry. His peculiar style, characterised by quick brushstrokes and the use of bright colours, was developed under the influence of the contemporary Venetian school with particular reference to view painters such as Marco Ricci and Francesco Guardi.

== Other projects ==
Media related to Francesco Simonini at Wikimedia Commons
