= Charlotte Jones =

Charlotte Jones may refer to:

- Charlotte Jones (writer) (born 1968), British playwright and actress
- Charlotte Jones (painter) (1768–1847), miniature painter to Princess Charlotte
- Charlotte Jones (comics), fictional character (a latent mutant in the Marvel Comics Universe)
- Alex Jones (Welsh presenter) (Charlotte Alexandra Jones, born 1977), Welsh television presenter
- Charlotte Jones Anderson (born 1966), American businesswoman and football executive
