= Charles Ansell (painter) =

English artist

- Born: c. 1752
- Known for: Painting

Charles Ansell (born c. 1752) was an English artist.

== Work ==
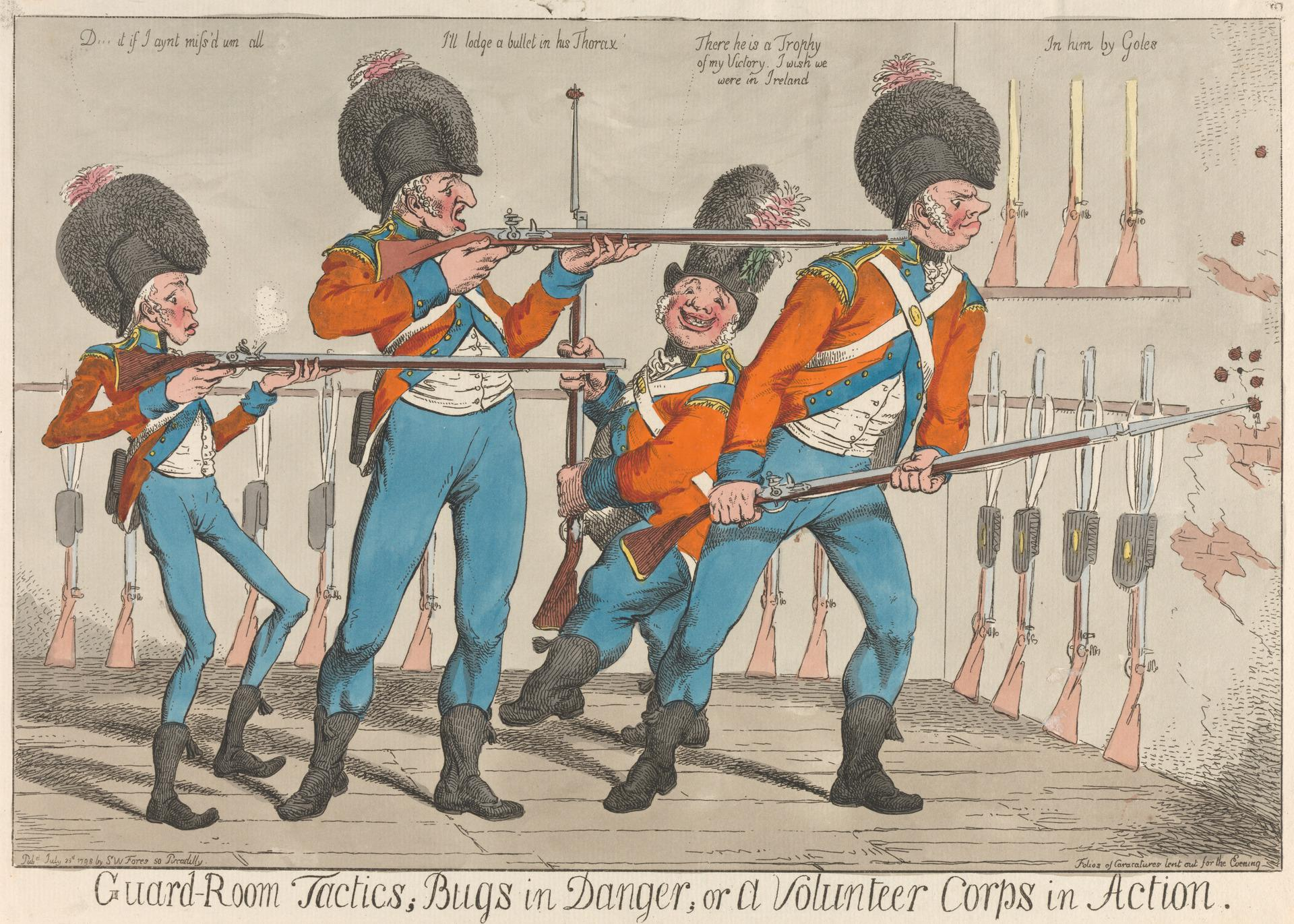
Guard-Room Tactics, Bugs in Danger, or a Volunteer Corps in Action (1798)

His name occurred only twice (1780 & 1781) in the catalogues of the Royal Academy. He was celebrated for his drawings of the horse, but also drew domestic subjects. His most celebrated work, Life and death of a Racehorse was engraved in a set of six plates by Francis Jukes, and published in 1784 by John Walker Carver & Printseller.

Other works were The graces of archery or elegant airs, attitudes and lady traps and a six plate set The life of a horse. Other works engraved by Peltro William Tomkins were The English Dressing Room, The English Fire Side, The French Dressing Room' and 'The French Fire Side.
