= Portrait of Francesco Bartolozzi =

Painting by Joshua Reynolds

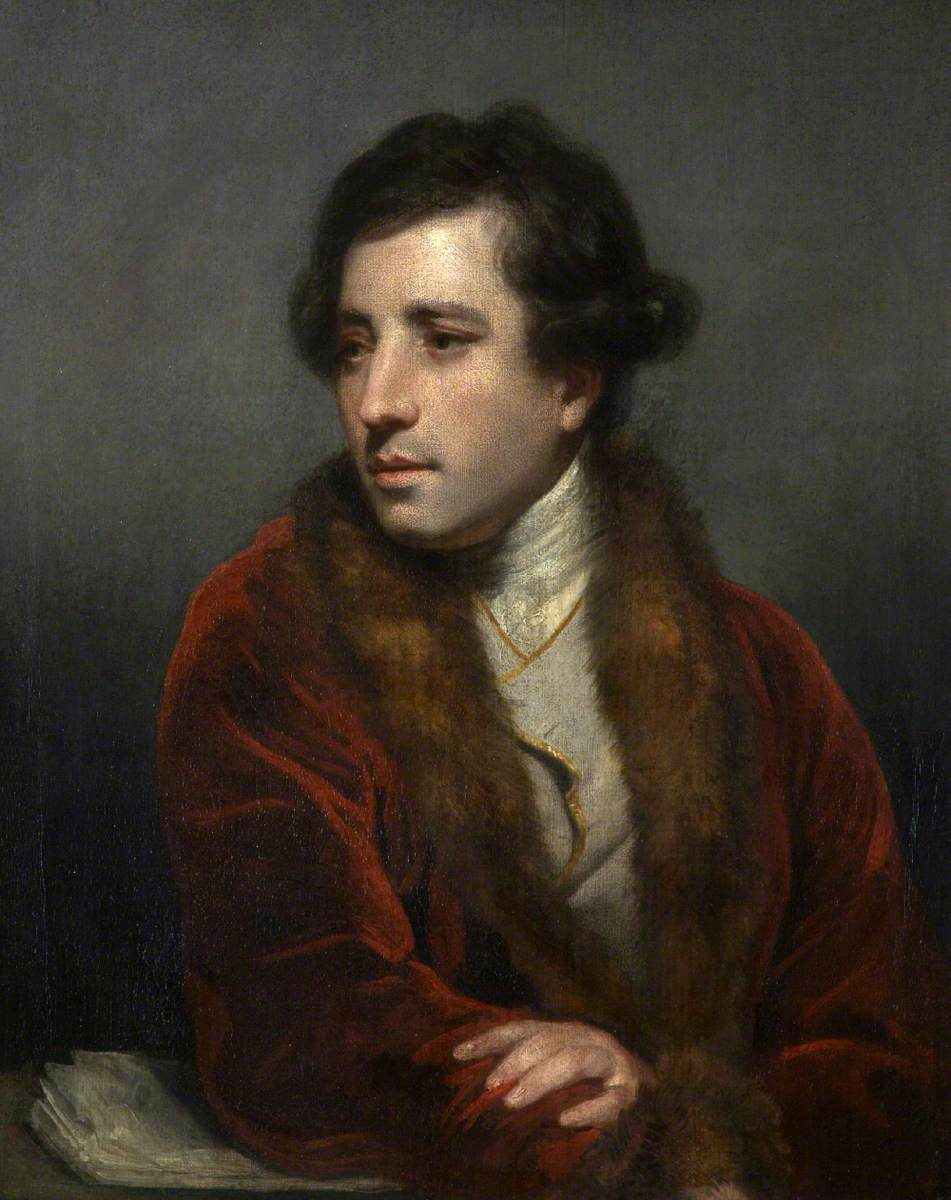
- Artist: Joshua Reynolds
- Year: 1773
- Type: Oil on canvas, portrait painting
- Dimensions: 76.2 cm × 63.5 cm (30.0 in × 25.0 in)
- Location: Saltram House; Devon

Portrait of Francesco Bartolozzi is a 1773 portrait painting by the English artist Joshua Reynolds. It depicts the Italian engraver Francesco Bartolozzi, who had settled in Britain to work. Reynolds was the first president of the Royal Academy, while Bartolozzi was a founding member.

The painting at one time belonged to Hester Thrale. Today it is in the collection of the National Trust at Saltram House outside Plymouth in Devon. An engraving by Bartolozzi himself was produced based on the Reynolds portrait, a copy of which is today in the National Portrait Gallery in London.

== Bibliography ==
- Eaves, Morris. The Counter-arts Conspiracy: Art and Industry in the Age of Blake. Cornell University Press, 1992.
- McIntyre, Ian. Joshua Reynolds: The Life and Times of the First President of the Royal Academy. Allen Lane, 2003.
- Postle, Edward (ed.) Joshua Reynolds: The Creation of Celebrity. Harry N. Abrams, 2005.
- Wendorf, Richard. Sir Joshua Reynolds: The Painter in Society. Harvard University Press, 1998.
