= Maria Cosway =

Italian-British artist (1760–1838)

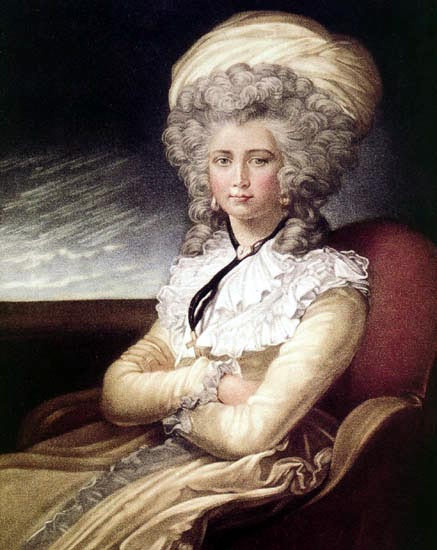
- Self-portrait, 1787
- Born: Maria Luisa Caterina Cecilia Hadfield; 11 June 1760; Florence, Grand Duchy of Tuscany
- Died: 5 January 1838 (aged 77); Lodi, Kingdom of Lombardy-Venetia
- Known for: Painter of portrait miniatures
- Spouse: Richard Cosway (m. 1781; died 1821)

Maria Luisa Caterina Cecilia Cosway (ma-RYE-ah; née Hadfield; 11 June 1760 – 5 January 1838) was an Italian-English painter, musician, and educator. She worked in England, France, and later Italy, cultivating a large circle of friends and clients, mainly as an initiate of Swedish and French Illuminism and an enthusiastic revivalist of the Masonic Knights Templar.

She exhibited at the Royal Academy of Arts, and commissioned the first portrait of Napoleon to be seen in England. Her paintings and engravings are held by the British Museum, the British Library, and the New York Public Library. Her work was included in London exhibitions at the National Portrait Gallery in 1995–96 and Tate Britain in 2006.

Cosway was an accomplished composer, musician, and society hostess with her husband, painter Richard Cosway. She had a brief romantic relationship with widowed American statesman Thomas Jefferson in 1786, while he served in Paris as the envoy to France; the pair kept up a correspondence until his death in 1826.

Cosway founded a girls' school in Lyon, which she directed from 1803 to 1809. Soon after it closed, she founded a girls' college and school in Lodi, northern Italy, which she directed until her death. She bequeathed the school to the Catholic Institute of the "English Ladies" (Dame inglesi in Italian), a branch of the religious Order founded by Mary Ward, now seat of the "Fondazione Maria Cosway" (Maria Cosway Foundation).

She was made a Baroness of the Austrian Empire in 1834 (Lodi was then in the Kingdom of Lombardy–Venetia, a State of the House of Habsburg-Lorraine).

== Childhood in Italy ==
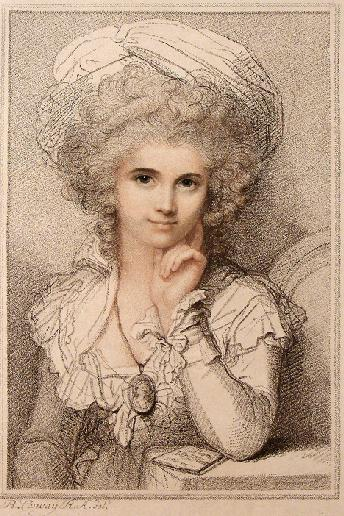
Maria Cosway by her husband, Richard Cosway

She was born in 1760 in Florence, Italy, to Charles Hadfield, said to have been a native of Shrewsbury, England, and an Italian mother. Her father was a successful innkeeper at Livorno, where he had become very wealthy. The Hadfields operated three inns in Tuscany, frequented by British aristocrats taking the Grand Tour. One of eight children, Maria demonstrated artistic talent at a young age during her Roman Catholic convent education. She remained a devout Catholic all her life.

Four of the Hadfield children were killed by a mentally ill nursemaid, who was caught after being overheard talking about killing Maria. The nurse claimed that her young victims would be sent to Heaven after she killed them. She was sentenced to life in prison. Maria, her brothers Richard and George, and a younger sister Charlotte were the survivors.

At her father's death, Maria expressed a strong desire to become a nun. Three years later, her mother and she travelled to England; they settled in London in 1779.

Maria's brother George Hadfield became an architect and designed Arlington House in Virginia. It later was owned by Robert E. Lee, noted as a Confederate general during the American Civil War.

== Early career ==
While still in Florence, Maria Hadfield studied art under Violante Cerroti and Johann Zoffany. From 1773 to 1778, she copied Old Masters at the Uffizi Gallery. For her work, she was elected to the Academia del Disegno in Florence in 1778. She also went to Rome, where she studied art under Pompeo Batoni. She studied with Anton Raphael Mengs, Henry Fuseli, and Joseph Wright of Derby.

Two women artists, Angelica Kauffman and Mary Moser, were among the original members of the Royal Academy of Arts in London in 1768. Kauffmann helped Maria Hadfield to participate in academy exhibitions. In 1781, she exhibited for the first time, showing: Rinaldo, Creusa appearing to Aeneas (engraved in mezzotint by V. Green), and Like patience on a monument smiling at grief. Hadfield went on to gain success as a painter of mythological scenes.

== Marriage and social success ==
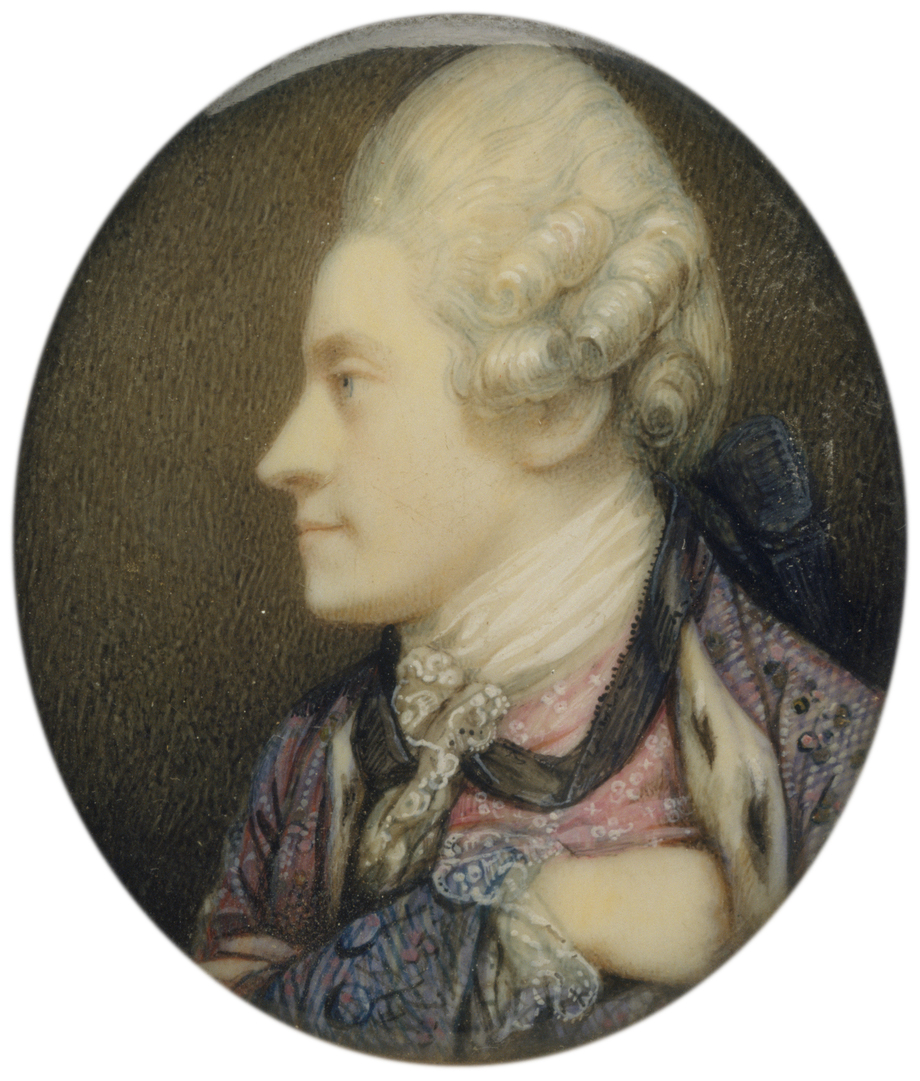
Richard Cosway's self-portrait in miniature, c. 1770

On 18 January 1781, Maria Hadfield married a fellow artist, celebrated miniature portrait painter Richard Cosway, in what is thought to have been a marriage of convenience. He was 20 years her senior, known as a libertine, and was repeatedly unfaithful to her. Richard was "commonly described as resembling a monkey".

Her Italian manners were so foreign that her husband kept Maria secluded until she fully mastered the English language. Cosway also forbade his wife from selling her paintings, possibly out of fear of the gossip that surrounded female painters. Her Self-Portrait with Arms Folded is seen as a response to his limitation of her work, her folded arms acting as a sign of her inability to practice. But, in time he realised his wife's talent and helped her to develop it. More than 30 of her works were displayed at the Royal Academy of Art from 1781 until 1801. She soon enhanced her reputation as an artist, especially when the Duchess of Devonshire as Cynthia her portrait of the Duchess of Devonshire in the character of Cynthia from The Faerie Queene was exhibited at the Royal Academy Exhibition of 1782 at Somerset House. Among her personal acquaintances were Lady Lyttelton; the acclaimed sculptor Hon. Mrs. Damer, the Countess of Aylesbury; Lady Cecilia Johnston, wife of General James Johnston; and the Marchioness Townshend.

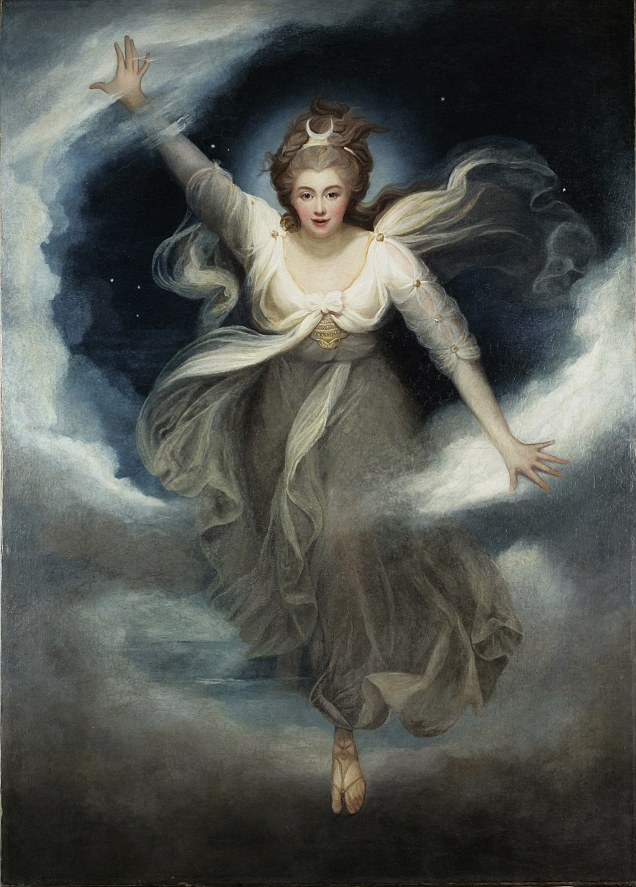
Duchess of Devonshire as Cynthia, 1782

In 1784, the Cosways moved into Schomberg House, Pall Mall, and developed a fashionable salon for London society. Richard was a principal painter of the Prince of Wales, and Maria served as hostess to artists, members of royalty including the Prince, and politicians including Horace Walpole, Gouverneur Morris, and James Boswell. She could speak several languages, and due to her travels in Italy and France, she gained an international circle of friends. These included Angelica Schuyler Church and artist John Trumbull. Maria Cosway organised concerts and recitals for her guests. She became known as "The Goddess of Pall-Mall". The Cosways employed the former slave Ottobah Cugoano as a servant. In 1791, they moved to Stratford Place where they undertook substantial renovations.

Richard and Maria had one child together, Louisa Paolina Angelica, but the couple eventually separated. Maria often travelled on the Continent, on one occasion accompanied by Luigi Marchesi, a famous Italian castrato. (Richard Cosway had painted his portrait, which afterward was engraved by Luigi Schiavonetti (1790). At the same time, Richard was having an open affair with Mary Moser, with whom he travelled for six months. In his notebooks, he made "invidious comparisons between her and Mrs Cosway," implying that she was much more sexually responsive than his wife.

When staying in Lyon, France, Maria Cosway made a pilgrimage to the shrine of the Virgin Mary at Loreto. This was to fulfill a vow she had made after giving birth to a living child. While she was travelling on the Continent, her young daughter Louisa died.

== Work in Napoleonic France ==
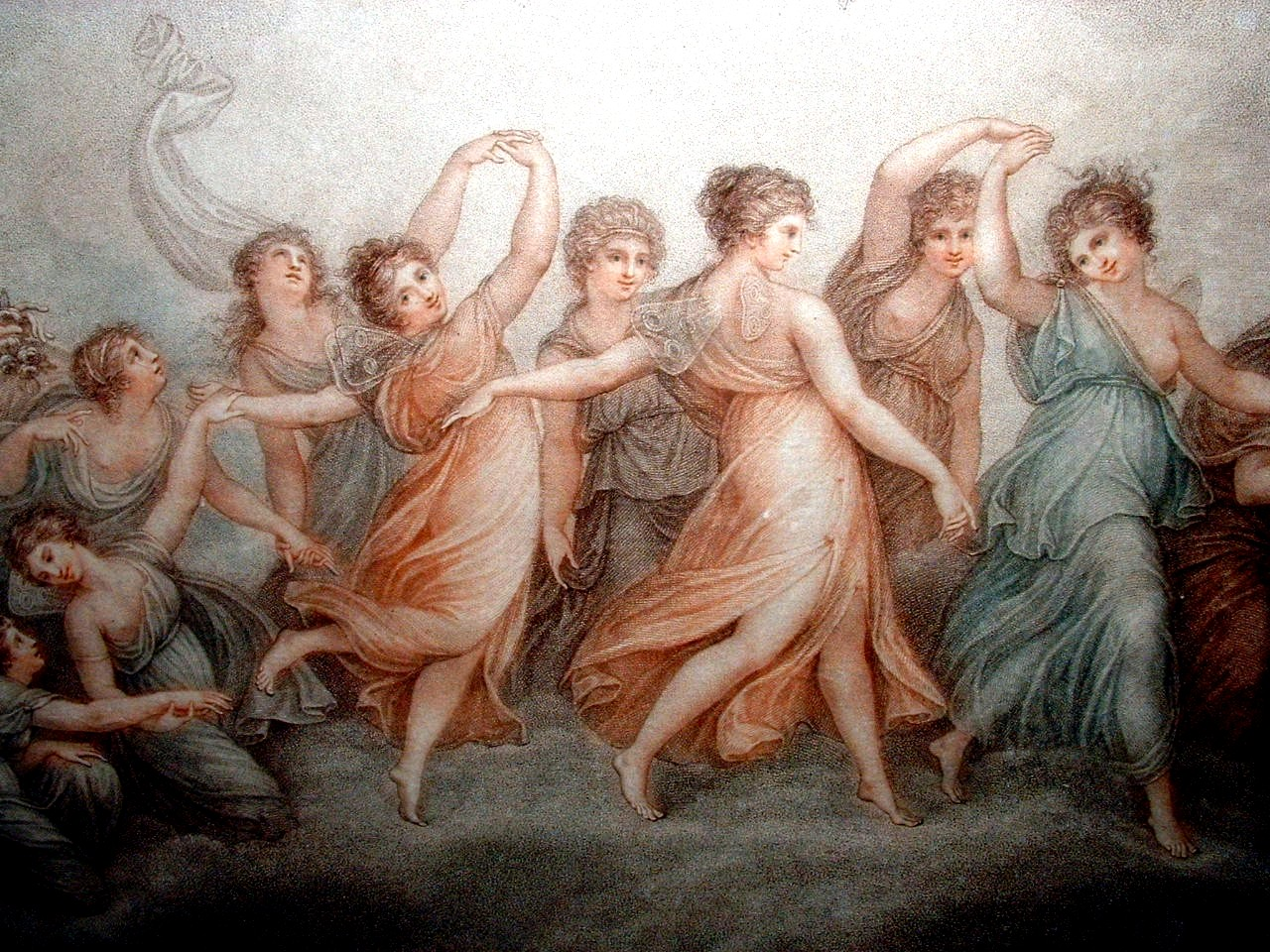
Engraving by Francesco Bartolozzi of Maria Cosway's painting The Hours, described by Jacques-Louis David as "ingenious"

Throughout this period, Cosway cultivated international contacts in the art world. When she sent an engraving of her allegorical painting The Hours to her friend, French painter Jacques-Louis David, he replied: "On ne peut pas faire une poésie plus ingénieuse et plus naturelle" ("one could not create a more ingenious or more natural poetic work"). Cosway became well known throughout France and had customers from all over the Continent.

Cosway also showed an interest in French politics. In 1797, then living on Oxford Street in London, she commissioned artist Francesco Cossia to create what was to be the first portrait of Napoleon seen in England. Cosway may have been the first person in Britain to see the face of Napoleon. Her commission of the portrait was later called the "earliest recorded evidence of British admiration for Napoleon." Later acquired by Sir John Soane, the painting is displayed in the Breakfast Room of Sir John Soane's Museum.

While living in Paris between 1801 and 1803, Cosway copied the paintings of the Old Masters from the Louvre for publication as etchings in England. After the death of her daughter while she was in France, she did not finish the project.

Maria Cosway met Napoleon while copying Napoleon Crossing the Alps by her friend David. She became close friends with Napoleon's uncle, Cardinal Joseph Fesch. During the Peace of Amiens, she gave British visitors tours of the cardinal's art collection. One historian pointed out that her admiration for Napoleon may have been inspired by her then-lover Pasquale Paoli, a Corsican general in exile in London, who had been an associate of Bonaparte's.

== Relationship with Thomas Jefferson ==
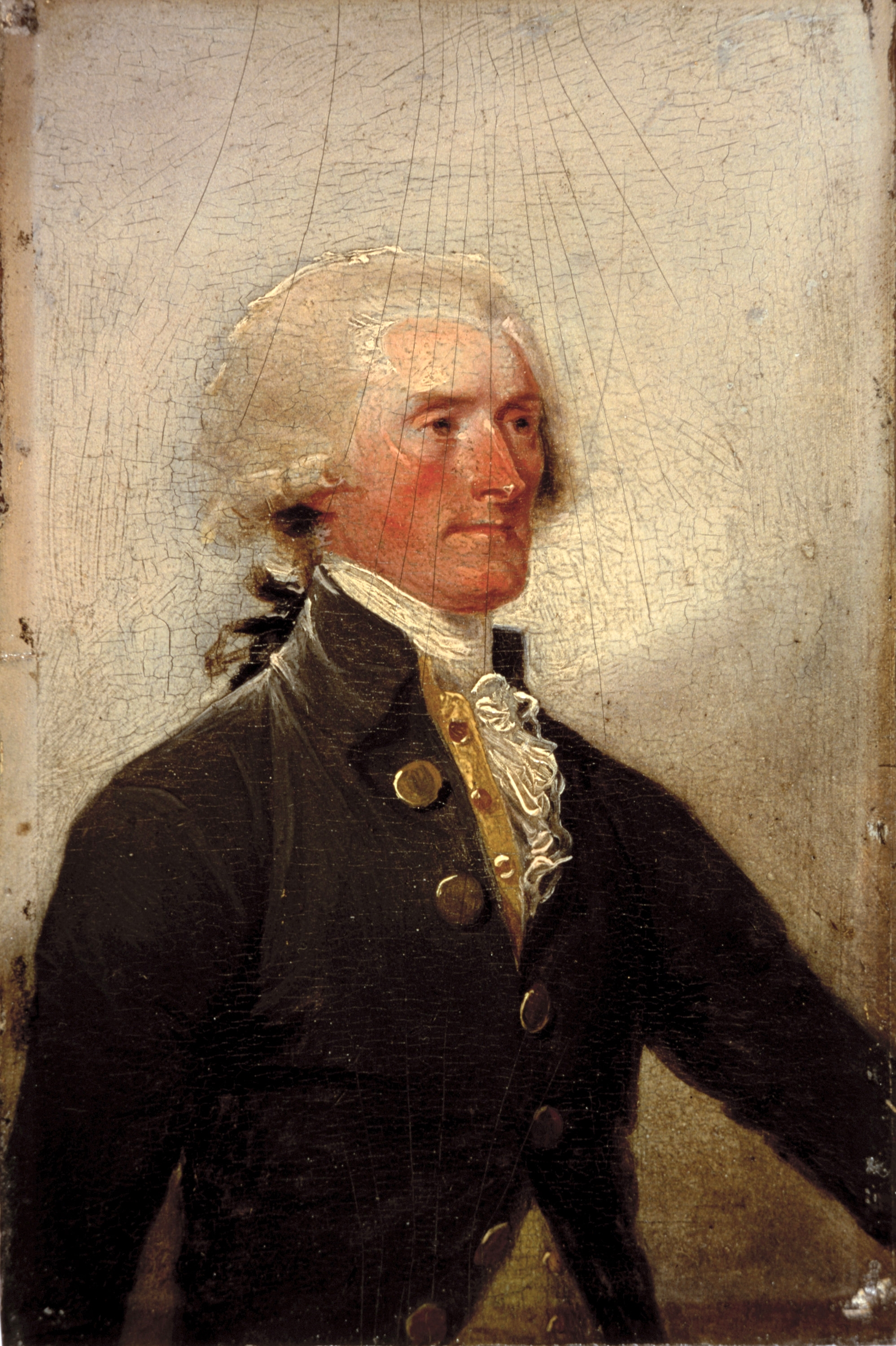
Thomas Jefferson in 1788 by John Trumbull. An intimate friend, Jefferson corresponded with Maria for the rest of their lives after his time in Paris.

At the Grain Market (Halles aux Bleds), in Paris, August 1786, John Trumbull introduced the Cosways to Jefferson, then a widower at 43 serving as American minister to France. Maria was 27. Jefferson then begged off his scheduled dinner companion, saying he needed to tend to official business, and instead spent the evening with Maria at the Palais Royal.

Cosway and Jefferson shared an interest in art and architecture; together, they attended exhibitions throughout the city and countryside. He would write of their adventures: "How beautiful was every object! the Pont du Neuilly, the hills along the Seine, the rainbows of the Machine of Marly, the terraces of Saint Germain, the chateaux, the gardens, the statues of Marly, the Pavilion of Louveciennes.... In the evening, when one took a retrospect of the day, what a mass of happiness had we travelled over!" Over the course of six weeks, Jefferson developed a romantic attachment to Cosway, spending each day with her.

At her husband's insistence, the Cosways departed for London. Jefferson's 4,000-word "The Dialogue of the Head vs. the Heart" love letter followed dated 12–13 October 1786. He describes his head conversing with his heart—a struggle between the practical and the romantic.

I feel more fit for death than life. But when I look back on the pleasures of which it is a consequence, I am conscious they were worth the price I am paying.

— Thomas Jefferson to Maria Cosway, "A Dialogue of the Head vs. the Heart"

Scholars suggest that Jefferson was particularly partial to a romantic attachment at this point in his life. Martha Jefferson had died four years before, he had just learned of the death of his youngest daughter Lucy, and his other two daughters were away at school. During the same period, Jefferson began a relationship with Sally Hemings, a mixed-race enslaved girl and the half-sister of his late wife, at the time aged between 14 and 16, who was pregnant by him when the household returned to the United States in 1789.

One account held that Cosway began to develop stronger feelings for Jefferson, but when she travelled to Paris to meet him again, she found him more distant.

A devout Catholic who did not want to have children, she worried about pregnancy. Some historians believe nothing further developed besides correspondence. Since Jefferson was very discreet, no one knows for certain the extent of their relationship. Jefferson eventually stopped writing her until some time later, when she contacted him; their renewed correspondence continued until his death. Historians such as Andrew Burstein have suggested the relationship was romantic mostly on Jefferson's side, and that Cosway was his opposite, more artistic than rational. Their correspondence survives. Before Jefferson left Paris, he wrote her, "I am going to America and you are going to Italy. One of us is going the wrong way, for the way will ever be wrong that leads us further apart."

Cosway introduced Jefferson to her friend Angelica Schuyler Church, the sister-in-law of his rival Alexander Hamilton. Church kept up a correspondence with both Jefferson and Cosway in later life; her correspondence with them is held at the University of Virginia's archive.

Cosway and Jefferson both held images of the other. He kept an engraving by Luigi Schiavonetti from a drawing by Maria's husband. Trumbull was commissioned by Maria to paint a portrait of Jefferson; this remained in the collection of Cosway's paintings and papers looked after by the nuns at the convent school she had founded in Lodi until the Italian government put immense pressure on the nuns at the American Bicentennial to relinquish it, so that Italy could give it to the White House, where it remains aside from a brief display as part of a Smithsonian exhibition.

== Later life ==
Cosway eventually returned to the Continent, travelled with her brother George Hadfield in Italy, where she lived in the north for three years, and then returned to England after her daughter's death at age six, concentrating on painting, completing several religious pictures for chapels.

Despite Napoleon's war with England, she travelled to France. In Paris, Cardinal Joseph Fesch persuaded her to establish a college for young ladies in Lyon, which she managed from 1803 until 1809. The Duke of Lodi invited her to Italy to establish a convent and Catholic school for girls in Lodi (near Milan). She directed the Collegio delle Grazie in northern Italy until her death in 1838.

In 1821, Cosway briefly returned to England to care for her husband before his death. With the aid of her friend Sir John Soane, she auctioned Richard's large art collection, and used the funds to support the convent school. For a short time, following the death of Richard Cosway, her close friend Sir John Soane served as the executor to her estate.

In a letter to Jefferson (held by the University of Virginia), Cosway mourned the loss of mutual old friends following the death of Angelica Schuyler Church. As a tribute to Church, Cosway designed a temple ceiling depicting the Three Graces surrounding her friend's name. In June 1826, she wrote to Italian engraver Giovanni Paolo Lasinio, Junior, respecting the publication of her husband's drawings in Florence.

The end of her life included service at her school, and making substantial renovations and additions to the medieval building. Cosway died in 1838 at her school in Lodi. Amongst her bequests was one for Charlotte Jones, who was a previous student of her husband's, but who had failing eyesight at the end of her life.

== Collections ==
Cosway's engravings from the Old Masters of the Louvre are held in the collection of the British Museum. Two of her paintings that relate to a poem by Mary Robinson were acquired by the New York Public Library. They were included in the exhibit Gothic Nightmares: Fuseli, Blake and the Romantic Imagination at the Tate Britain museum in London in 2006.

From 1995 to 1996, the National Portrait Gallery in London held an exhibition entitled Richard and Maria Cosway: Regency Artists of Taste and Fashion, displaying 250 of their works.

== Works and reproductions ==
Cosway's principal works exhibited at the Royal Academy and later engraved are:

- Clytie (engraved by V. Green; engraver's name shown in parentheses below)
- The Descent from the Cross (V. Green)
- Astrea instructing Arthegal (V. Green)
- The Judgment on Korah, Dathan, and Abiram (S. W. Reynolds)
- A Persian (Emma Smith)
- H.R.H. the Princess of Wales and the Princess Charlotte by S. W. Reynolds
- The Hours by Francesco Bartolozzi
- Lodona by Francesco Bartolozzi
- The Guardian Angel, by S. Phillips
- Going to the Temple, by Peltro William Tomkins
- The Birth of the Thames, by Tomkins
- Creusa appearing to Aeneas by V. Green
- The Preservation of Shadrach, Meshac, and Abednego, by W. S. Reynolds
- Louis VII, King of France, before Becket's Tomb, by W. Sharp.

Cosway drew The Progress of Female Dissipation and The Progress of Female Virtue, published in 1800. She also published a series of 12 designs, entitled The Winter's Day contributed to Boydell's Shakespeare Gallery and Macklin's Poets. She etched all the plates in a large folio work entitled Gallery of the Louvre, represented by etchings executed solely by Mrs. Maria Cosway, with an Historical and Critical Description of all the Pictures which compose the Superb Collection, and a Biographical Sketch of the Life of each Painter, by J. Griffiths, &c. &c. (1802). Her numerous other plates, some in soft-ground etching, are held mostly by the British Library.

== In film ==
- Jefferson in Paris, 1995 movie by Merchant and Ivory in which Maria Cosway is portrayed by Greta Scacchi

== See also ==
- Women artists
