= Peltro William Tomkins =

English engraver and draughtsman

Peltro William Tomkins (1759 – 22 April 1840) was an English engraver and draughtsman.

== Life ==
He was born in London, and was baptised 15 October 1759, the younger son of William Tomkins (1730?–1792), a landscape-painter, and his wife Susanna Callard; Charles Tomkins the antiquarian draughtsman and aquatint engraver was his elder brother. He became a pupil of Francesco Bartolozzi, and working in the dot and stipple style.

British Gallery of Pictures Act 1817
- Act of Parliament
- Parliament of the United Kingdom
- Long title: An Act to enable Peltro William Tomkins of New Bond Street, in the City of Westminster, Engraver to The Queen's Most Excellent Majesty, to dispose of his Collection of Paintings, Drawings and Engravings, together with several Copies of certain Books therein mentioned, and the Lease of the Premises called The British Gallery of Pictures, by way of Lottery.
- Citation: 57 Geo. 3. c. lxi

Dates
- Royal assent: 27 June 1817

Text of statute as originally enacted

British Gallery of Pictures Act 1820
- Act of Parliament
- Parliament of the United Kingdom
- Long title: An Act to extend and amend an Act, passed in the Fifty seventh Year of His late Majesty, to enable Peltro William Tomkins Engraver, to dispose of his Collection of Paintings, Drawings, and Engravings, together with several Copies of certain Books therein mentioned, and the Lease of the Premises called The British Gallery of Pictures, by way of Lottery.
- Citation: 1 Geo. 4. c. lxxxix

Dates
- Royal assent: 24 July 1820

Text of statute as originally enacted

Tomkins was engaged as drawing-master to the daughters of George III, and spent time at court, receiving the appointment of historical engraver to the queen. For some years he carried on business as a print publisher in Bond Street. Ambitious projects involved him in heavy financial losses; he then obtained an act of Parliament, the British Gallery of Pictures Act 1817 (57 Geo. 3. c. lxi) authorising him to dispose by lottery of the collection of watercolour drawings from which his engravings were executed, together with unsold impressions of the plates, together valued at £150,000.

Tomkins died at his house in Osnaburgh Street, London, on 22 April 1840.

== Works ==
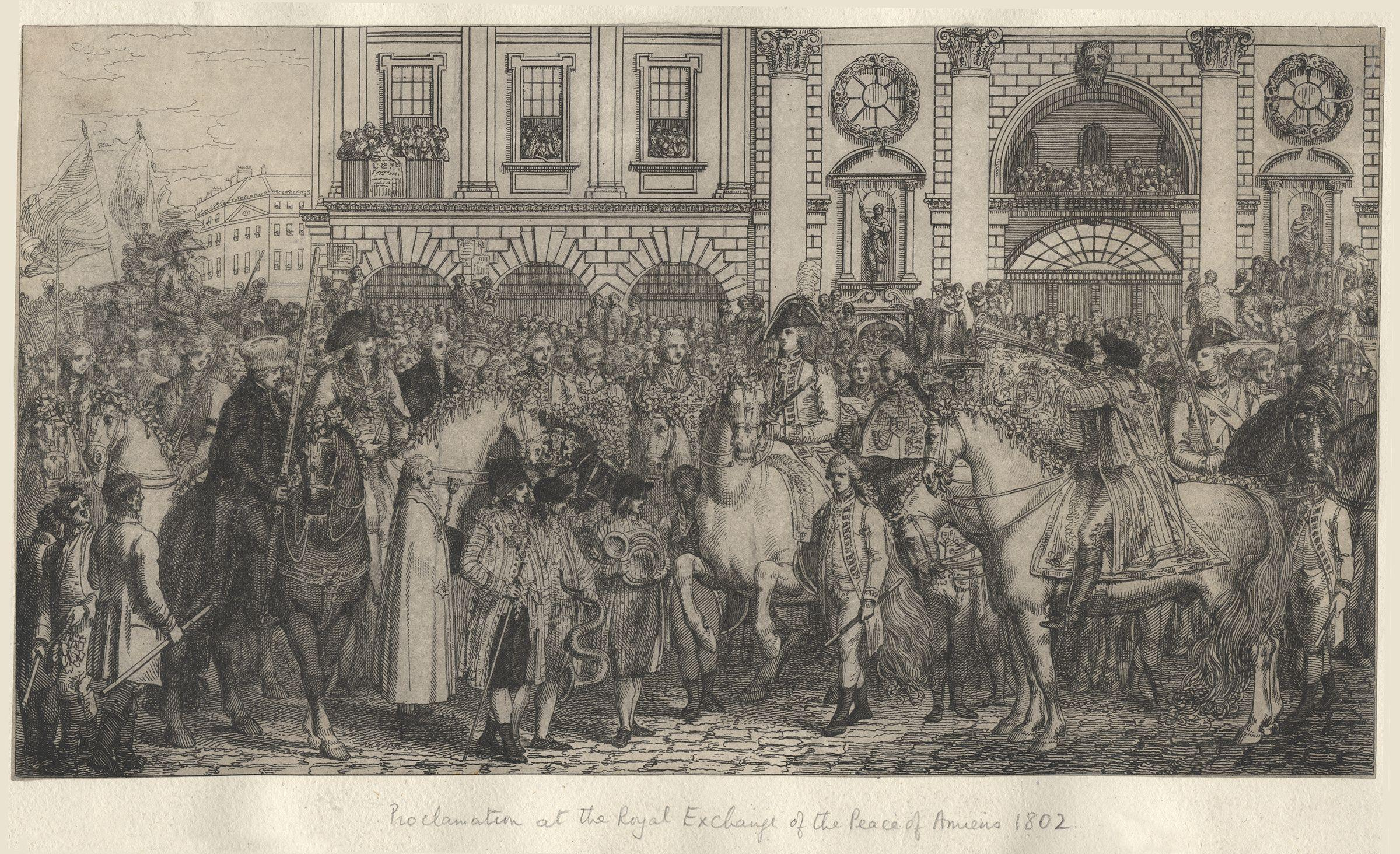
Proclamation at the Royal Exchange of the Peace of Amiens, 1802 by Peltro William Tomkins

Tomkins engraved from his own designs some "fancy" subjects as well as some portraits, including those of George III and his daughter, Charlotte, Princess Royal. In 1797 he produced a sumptuous edition of James Thomson's The Seasons, with plates by himself and Bartolozzi from designs by William Hamilton: the frontispiece to it had a medallion portrait of Tomkins, with others of Bartolozzi and Hamilton. He also planned two major works, The British Gallery of Art, with text by Henry Tresham and William Young Ottley, and The Gallery of the Marquess of Stafford, with text by Ottley, which both appeared in 1818. Many of the sets of prints were printed in colours. Other plates by Tomkins included:

- A Dressing Room à l'Anglaise, and A Dressing Room à la Française, a pair after Charles Ansell;
- English Fireside and French Fireside, another pair after Ansell;
- Cottage Girl shelling Peas and Village Girl gathering Nuts, a pair after William Redmore Bigg;
- Amyntor and Theodora, after Thomas Stothard;
- The Vestal, after Joshua Reynolds;
- Sylvia and Daphne, after Angelica Kauffmann;
- Louisa, after James Nixon;
- Birth of the Thames, after Maria Cosway;
- Madonna della Tenda, after Raphael;
- portrait of Mrs. Siddons, after John Downman; and
- portrait of Margaret Howard, Duchess of Norfolk, after Lucas de Heere.

Tomkins executed a set of illustrations to Sir James Bland Burgess's poem The Birth and Triumph of Love, from designs by Princess Elizabeth, and two sets of plates from papers cut by Lady Templetown. He was also a major contributor of illustrations to John Sharpe's British Poets, British Classics, and British Theatre. His last work was a series of three plates from copies by Harriet Whitshed of paintings discovered at Hampton Court, 1834–40. Also finished in 1812 a landscape with Moucheron design.

== Family ==
By his wife, Lucy Jones, Tomkins had a large family, including a daughter Emma, who practised as an artist and married Samuel Smith the engraver. A certain "M. Tomkins" said to be his pupil, engraved some portraits in 1797 (National Portrait Gallery).

== Notes ==
Attribution

This article incorporates text from a publication now in the public domain: Lee, Sidney, ed. (1899). "Tomkins, Peltro William". Dictionary of National Biography. Vol. 57. London: Smith, Elder & Co.
