= Duchess of Devonshire as Cynthia =

Painting by Maria Cosway

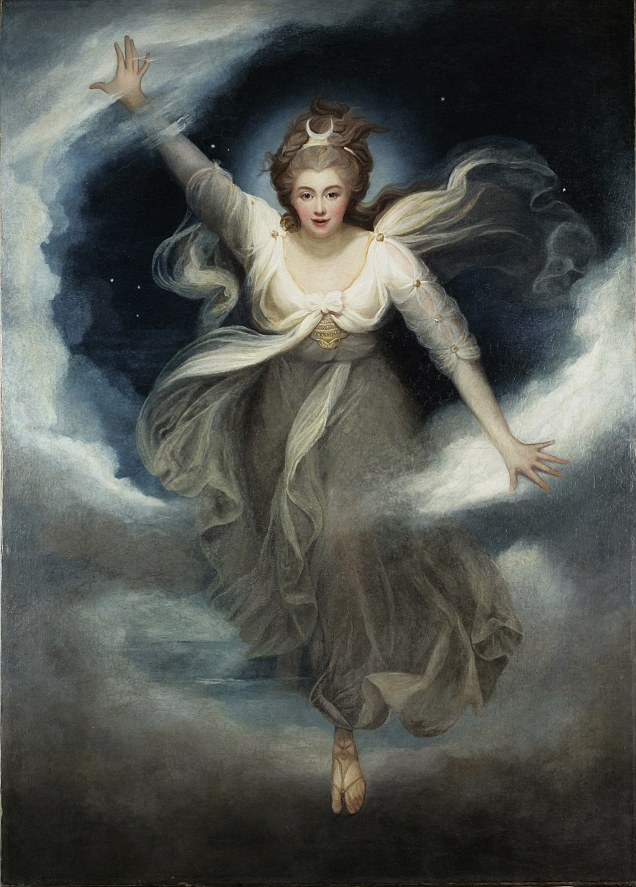
- Artist: Maria Cosway
- Year: 1782
- Type: Oil on canvas, portrait painting
- Dimensions: 223.5 cm × 162.6 cm (88.0 in × 64.0 in)
- Location: Chatsworth House, Derbyshire

Duchess of Devonshire as Cynthia is a 1782 portrait painting by the British artist Maria Cosway. It depicts the aristocrat Georgiana Cavendish, Duchess of Devonshire as the moon goddess Cynthia from Edmund Spenser's epic poem The Faerie Queene. The Duchess, a prominent socialite of the Georgian era, is shown in flight emerging from the clouds. It is noted for its innovate blend of portraiture and literature.

Cosway and her husband Richard Cosway lived in a residence in Berkley Square adjacent to that of the Duchess. Richard, a fashionable painter, was commissioned to produce a number of portrait miniatures of the Duchess. The painting was displayed at the Royal Academy Exhibition of 1782 at Somerset House in London, where it earned great praise. It is in the collection of Chatsworth House in Derbyshire. A mezzotint produced by Valentine Green was based on the painting.

== Bibliography ==
- Barber, Tabitha (ed.) Now You See Us: Women Artists in Britain, 1520-1920. Tate Britain, 2024.
- Foreman, Amanda. Georgiana, Duchess of Devonshire. HarperCollins, 1998
- Haywood, Ian, Matthews, Susan & Shannon, Mary L. (ed) Romanticism and Illustration. Cambridge University Press, 2019.
- Masters, Brian. Georgiana, Duchess of Devonshire. Hamish Hamilton, 1981.
