= The Hours (engraving) =

1788 stipple engraving by Francesco Bartolozzi

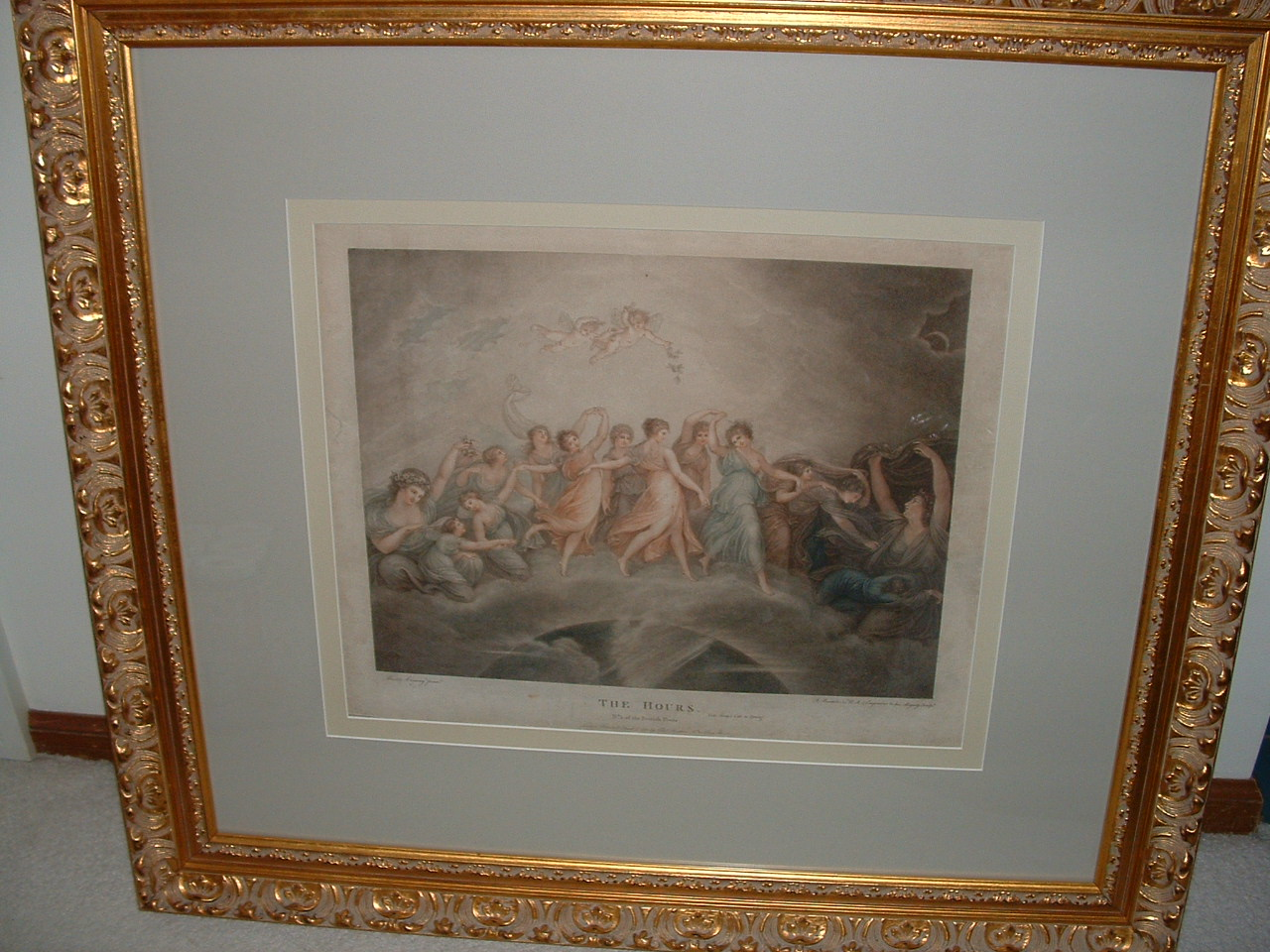
Coloured impression of the stipple engraving by Francesco Bartolozzi, mounted in an acid-free environment and placed behind conservation (or UV-protective) glass to prevent fauxing.

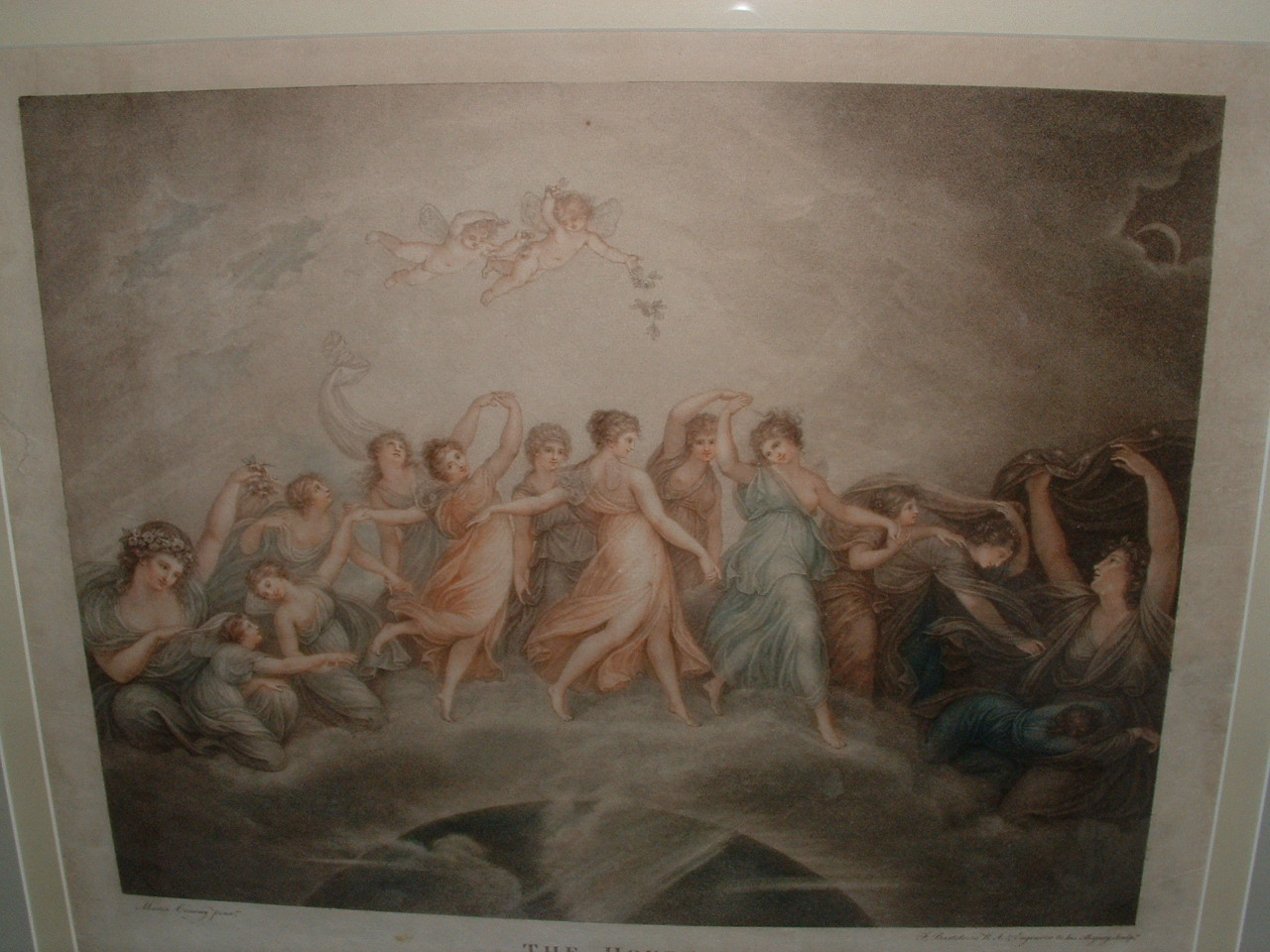
A closer view of The Hours engraving by Francesco Bartolozzi. This engraving is in very good condition, showing only three small spots of fauxing: two to the left of the title and one above the cherubs.

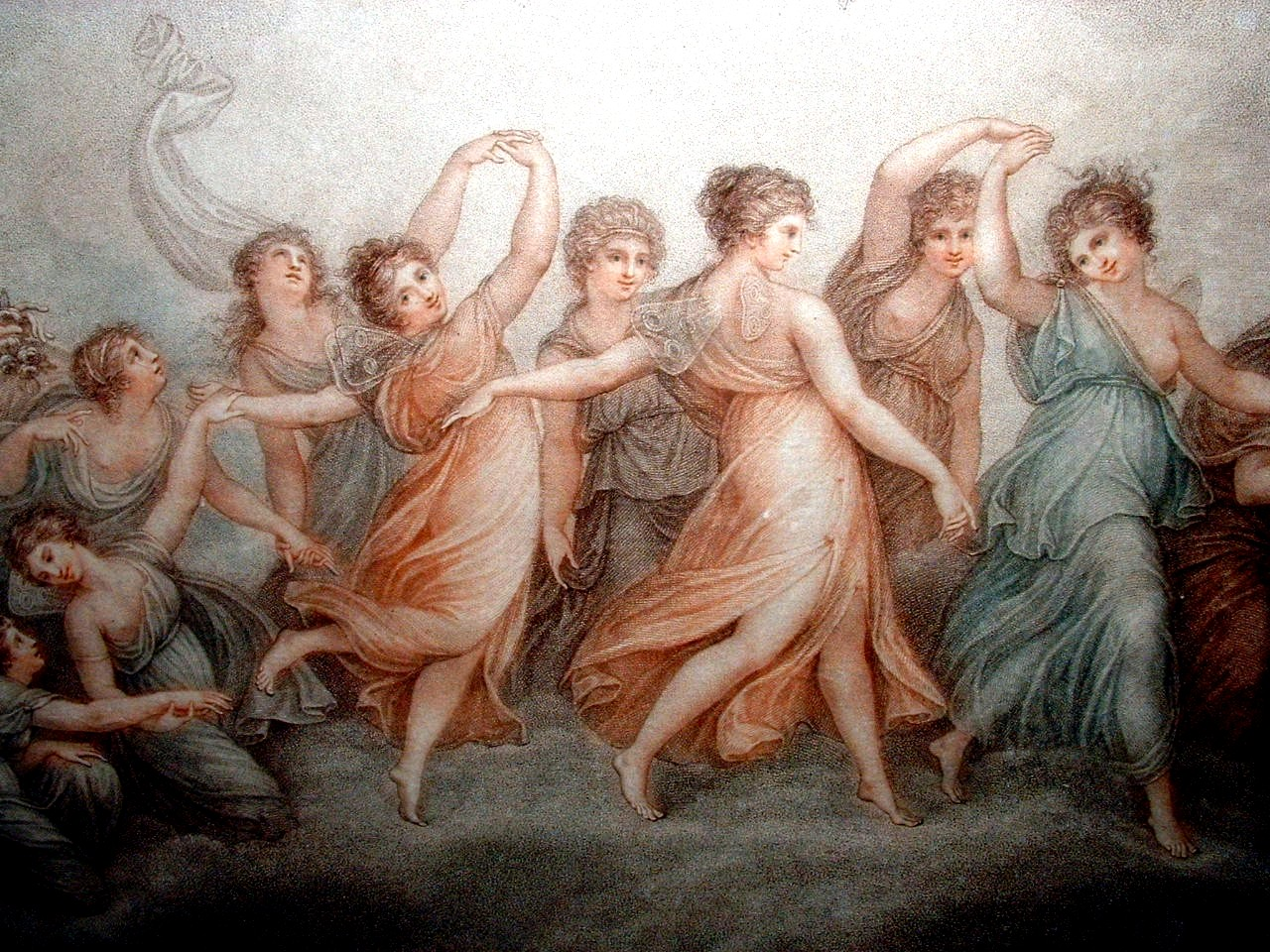
A larger view of the center area of The Hours by Maria Cosway (painting) and Francesco Bartolozzi (engraving), showing the detail in the transparent gowns and wings.

The Hours is a stipple engraving by a master of the technique, Francesco Bartolozzi (1725–1815), published on April 4, 1788, from the print shop of Thomas Macklin, at No. 39 Fleet Street, London. The print is based upon a painting by Maria Cosway (1760–1838). The dancing hours, or nymphs of Greek mythology, were a pictorial representation of the 1742 poem "Ode on the Spring" by British poet Thomas Gray (1716–1771). The poem begins:

"Lo! where the rosy-bosomed Hours,
Fair Venus' train, appear,
Disclose the long-expecting flowers,
And wake the purple year!
The Attic warbler pours her throat,
Responsive to the cuckoo's note,
The untaught harmony of spring:
While, whisp'ring pleasure as they fly,
Cool Zephyrs thro' the clear blue sky
Their gathered fragrance fling."

Maria Cosway sent a copy of the engraving to Jacques-Louis David (1748–1825), a highly influential French painter, who stated, "on ne peut pas faire une poesie plus ingenieuse et plus naturelle." ("One couldn't make poetry more ingenious and more natural.")

== The stippling technique ==
The stippling technique involved the etching, usually on a copper plate, of stipple dots to form an image. The process was tedious; many thousands of these dots were required to form an image of this quality. After the copper plate was etched, it was then used to make a number of prints by the usual intaglio method. The number depended upon how well the plate held up during the printing process, which abraded the plate slightly with each use. The earlier prints, therefore, were of better quality than the later ones. At some point, the plate became so worn that it was no longer usable.

The printing and coloring (hand washing) of each engraving was difficult, and required the hand of an artist. For that reason, many of these old original prints were inked by the master himself.

Stippling is used to excellent effect in representing transparent materials in the filmy gowns and gossamer wings of the nymphs.

== Details from The Hours ==
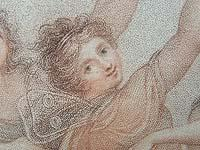
Detail showing the gossamer wings on the nymph.

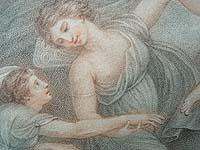
Detail showing the delicacy of the nymphs' hands.

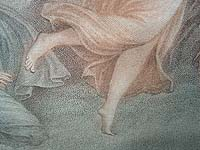
Detail showing the transparency of the hours' gowns.

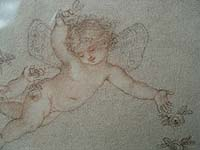
Detail showing one of the cupids above the hours.

== The title ==
The main title of this work of art: The Hours

First subtitle of The Hours: "No. 1 of the British Poets", referring to Thomas Gray

Second subtitle of The Hours: "Vide Gray's Ode to Spring", referring to Thomas Gray's "Ode on the Spring", vide is Latin for "see".

== The credits ==
On the righthand side under the engraving: "F. Bartolozzi R.A. & Engraver to his Majesty sculp^{t}." Francesco was a member of London's Royal Academy ("R.A."), and was the Royal Engraver to the king. Sculpt^{t} was an abbreviation of the Latin, sculpsit, which meant "he engraved"

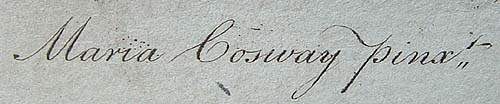
On the lefthand side under the engraving: "Maria Cosway pinx^{t}." Pinx^{t} was an abbreviation of the Latin, pinxit, which meant "she painted"

== Publication information ==
On the bottom center of the engraving is the date of publication: April 4, 1788.

On the bottom center of the engraving (continued from the above) is the place of publication: The Thomas Macklin print shop at No. 39 Fleet Street, London.
