= Domenico Bernardo Zilotti =

Venetian engraver

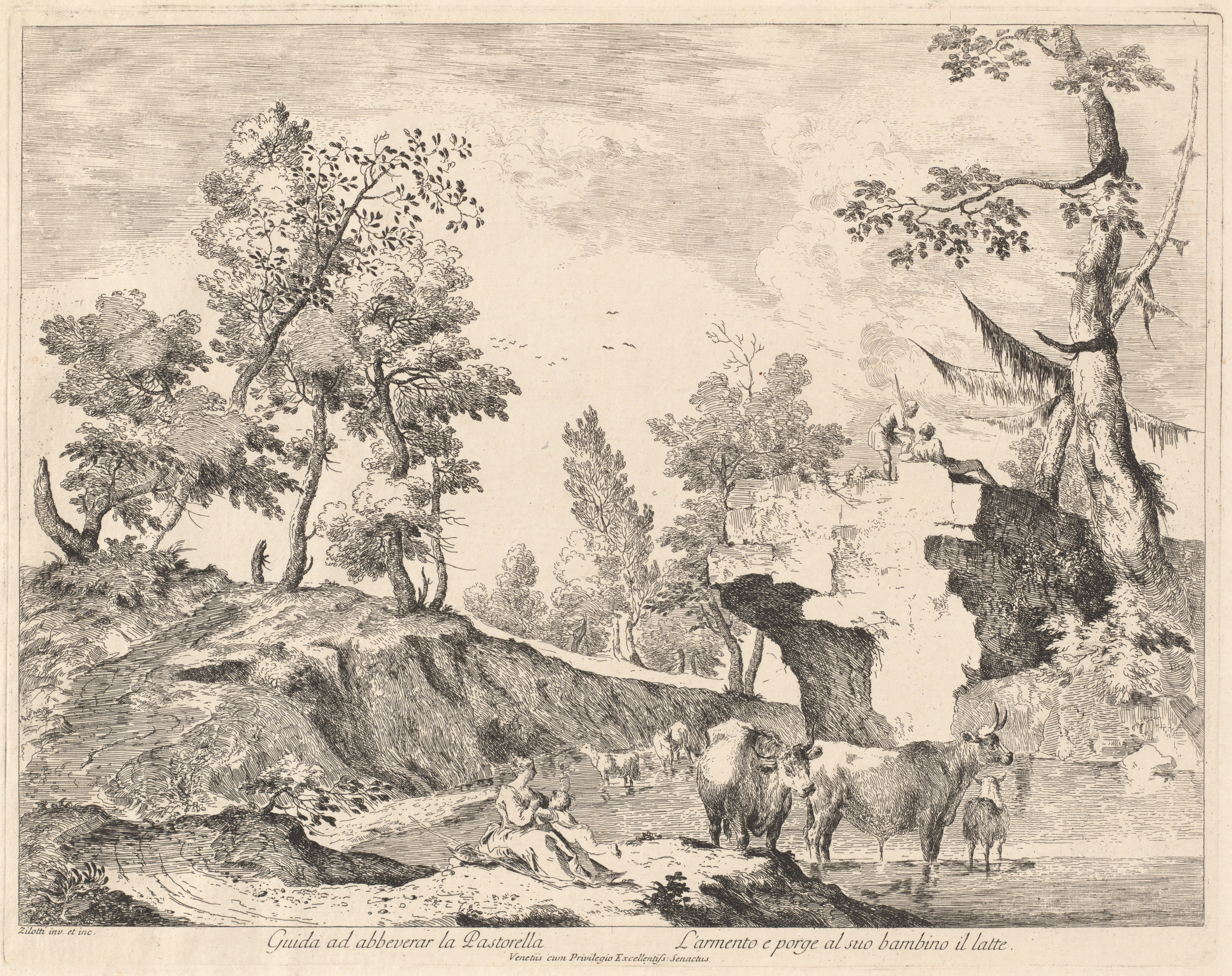
Landscape with Shepherdess and Herd at a Watering Hole, etching, 1760s(?)

Domenico Bernardo Zilotti (ca. 1730 - 1795) was a Venetian engraver.

== Life ==
Along with Francesco Zuccarelli, he completed a set of engravings on military subjects based on works by Francesco Simonini. Some of his etchings have also been attributed to Marco Ricci.

Zilotti collaborated with renowned artists of his time. This collaboration not only demonstrates Zilotti's talent as an engraver but also his ability to work as a team and adapt to the styles and themes of other artists. It was said at the time that any artwork involving a member of the Zilotti family would be acclaimed. And the fame proved true. Zilotti only participated in works by renowned artists.
