= Charlotte Jones (painter) =

British miniature portrait painter

- Born: 1768
- Died: 21 September 1847 (aged 78–79); London
- Occupation: Miniature portrait painter

Charlotte Jones (1768 – 21 September 1847) was a British miniature portrait painter. She was appointed "Miniature Painter to the Princess Charlotte of Wales" from 1808 until the premature death of her patron on 6 November 1817, shortly after failing to deliver a royal heir. Jones' most memorable creation was a triptych that recorded the Princess's life.

== Life ==
The Jones family lived in Norfolk, where her father, William Jones, was a merchant in the small village of Cley next the Sea. Near the turn of the 19th century Jones moved to London after the death of her father. There she learnt how to create miniature paintings on ivory from Richard Cosway. Jones was taken into Sir Thomas Lawrence's and Cosway's group and her work is similar in style to her teacher with influence from Lawrence.

After ten years of exhibiting at the Royal Academy and having been appointed "Miniature Painter to the Princess Charlotte of Wales" in 1808, she started her own business in Lower Grosvenor Street in London in 1810. Here, her skills and striking appearance contributed to her success. She was able to attract commissions that included other members of the royal family and an early portrait was of Prince William, later William IV. Her subjects included Lady Caroline Lamb and the future George IV.

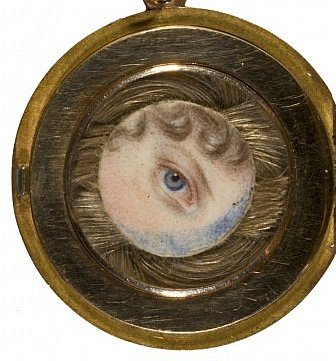
The Eye of Princess Charlotte of Wales- detail of gold locket.

Her most well known work was "The Princess Charlotte, from her Cradle to her Grave", a triptych made up of twelve portraits of her erstwhile patron. Princess Charlotte of Wales died shortly after failing to deliver a royal heir. This meant that there was no legitimate heir to King George III and so caused widespread mourning. Jones was able to cover Charlotte's lifespan by drawing on sketches that had been made by Cosway of Charlotte when she was a child. The resulting triptych was initially owned by Sir Lawrence Jones, 2nd Baronet of Norfolk. After the triptych was exhibited it was purchased for the Royal Collection.

Another creation was "The Eye of Princess Charlotte of Wales", an eye miniature which is in the National Gallery in London. This is a gold locket which contains a water colour miniature of just the eye of the Princess, painted on ivory, surrounded by a frame of Princess Charlotte's hair. That kind of jewel, a lover's eye, was not at all unusual : on the contrary it was " the height of fashion in the Georgian era".

Jones was based in Bath later in life where she created a self-portrait. Richard Cosway's widow, the artist Maria Cosway left her money when she died in 1838.

Jones died on 21 September 1847 in London.
