= Marco Ricci =

Italian painter (1676-1730)

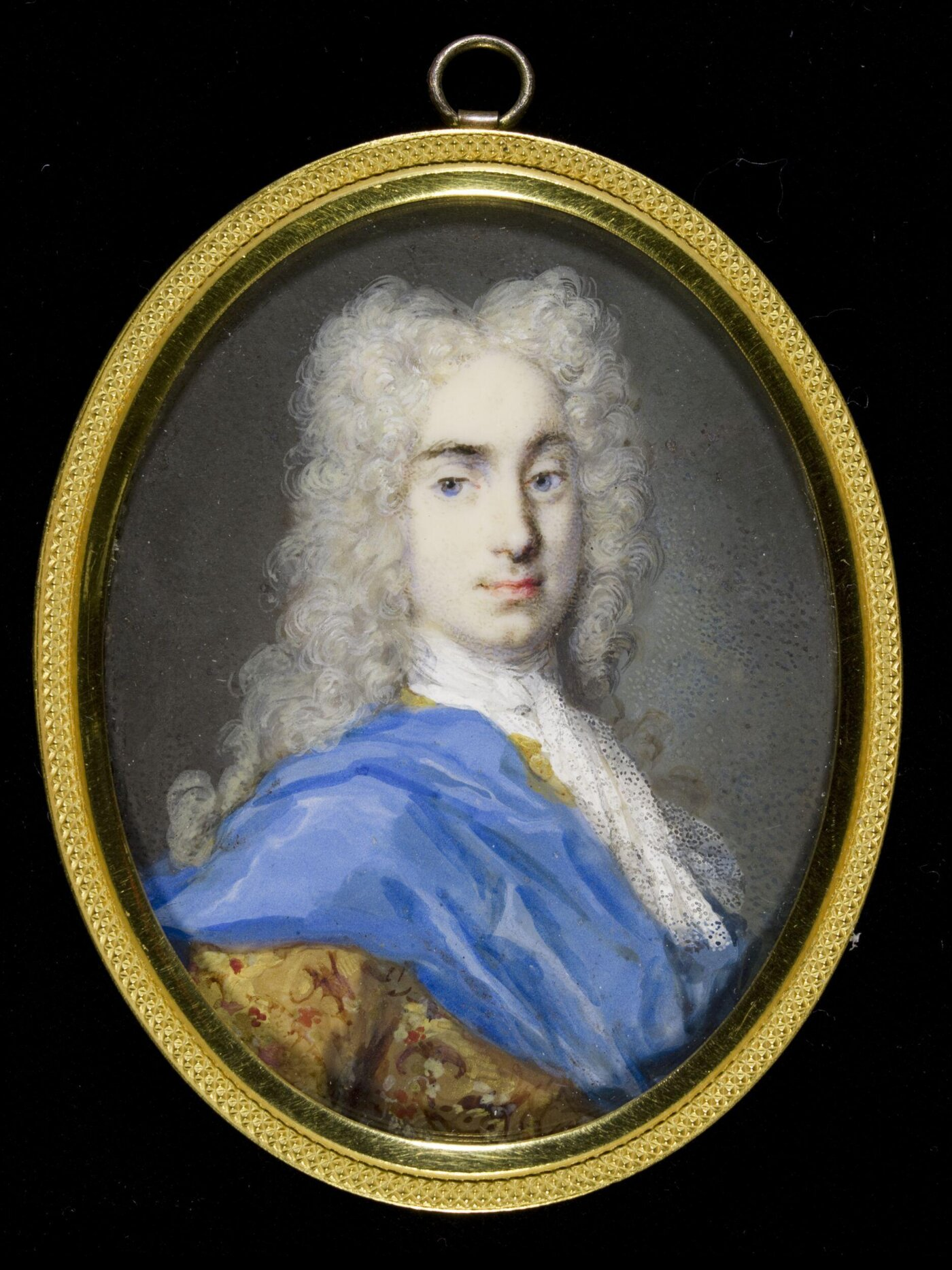
- Marco Ricci by Rosalba Carriera, circa 1724.
- Born: Marco Ricci; 6 June 1676; Belluno, Republic of Venice
- Died: 21 January 1730 (aged 53); Venice, Italy
- Known for: Painting
- Movement: Rococo

Marco Ricci (6 June 1676 – 21 January 1730) was an Italian Baroque painter.

== Early years ==
He was born at Belluno and received his first instruction in art from his uncle, Sebastiano Ricci, likely in Milan in 1694–6. He left for Venice with his uncle in 1696, but had to flee the city. He visited Rome, where he was for some time occupied in painting perspective views. In 1706–7, he worked with his uncle on the decoration of the Sala d'Ercole in the Palazzo Fenzi, located in Florence. Ricci's propensity for collaboration with other artists makes his early style difficult to trace, but it is generally agreed that his influences included Claude Lorrain, Gaspard Dughet, and Salvator Rosa, along with a naturalistic style of landscape painting practiced in the Veneto in the 17th and early 18th centuries. Closer in time, and known personally by Ricci, was the Genoese painter Alessandro Magnasco, whose handling of loose paint and his long, thin, wiry figures are echoed in a number of Ricci's early canvases.

== Stays in England ==
Through the prompting of Charles Montagu, 4th Earl of Manchester, and British ambassador to Venice, in late 1708 Ricci traveled to England, and on his way there he stopped in the Netherlands to study Dutch landscape painting. In England, he frequently collaborated with the artist Pellegrini in the staging of Italian works at the Queen's Theatre in Haymarket. The pair painted stage scenery for two Italian operas, Pyrrhus and Demetrius by Alessandro Scarlatti and Nicola Haym, and Camilla by Antonio Maria Bononcini and Silvio Stampiglia, with English libretti by Owen McSwiney. With Pellegrini, he executed six large mythological canvases for Burlington House. Ricci returned to Venice in 1711, but came back to England with his uncle Sebastiano the following year, with whom he collaborated on several commissions. During his time in England, Marco Ricci also painted several landscapes, capriccios, and the wry painting Opera Rehearsal for Charles Howard, 3rd Earl of Carlisle. His production as a landscapist can be divided into four categories: alpine views or pastorals, violent country storms, ruins, and scenes of villages or courtyards. While the medium of many of his works was oil on canvas, about half of his output, smaller in dimension, was tempera applied to goatskin.

== Venice ==
Marco Ricci returned to Venice in 1716, living with his uncle there until his death. Ricci's output in the 1720s was prodigious, and his production encompassed landscapes, capriccios, gouaches on vellum, drawings of stage designs and caricatures. He collaborated with Sebastiano on monumental figurative paintings. From 1723, Marco Ricci etched several plates from his own designs, consisting of views and landscapes, with ruins and figures, including a notable set of twenty-three prints which anticipate Piranesi. Important patrons of Ricci in Venice were Consul Smith and Zanetti the Elder. Marco Ricci can be regarded as the initiator of a new Venetian landscape style, which became an immediate international success. He died in Venice in 1730. Among his pupils were Domenico Bernardo Zilotti and Giuseppe Valeriani.

== Gallery ==
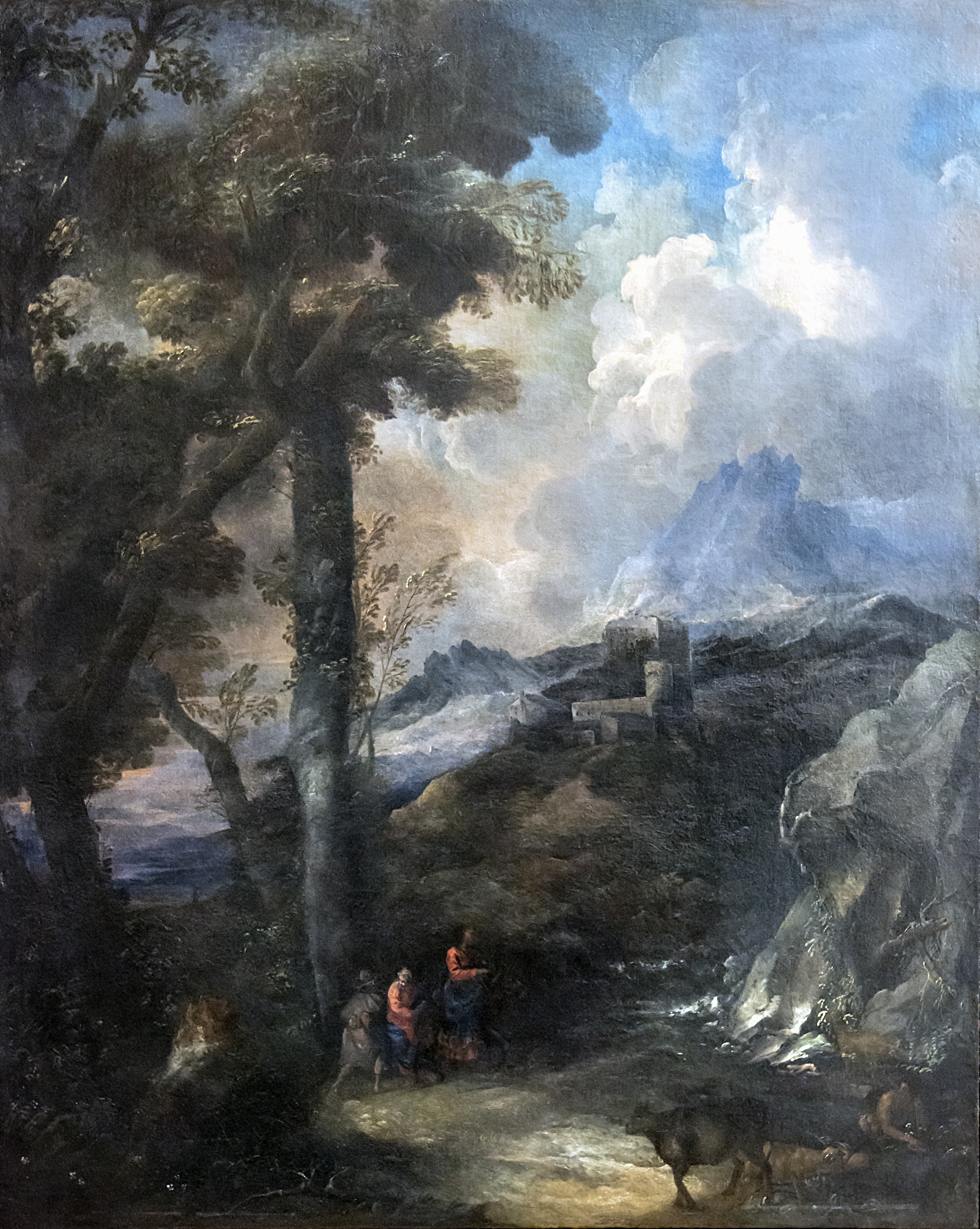
Landscape with Mountain and Figures. Gallerie dell'Accademia, Venice.

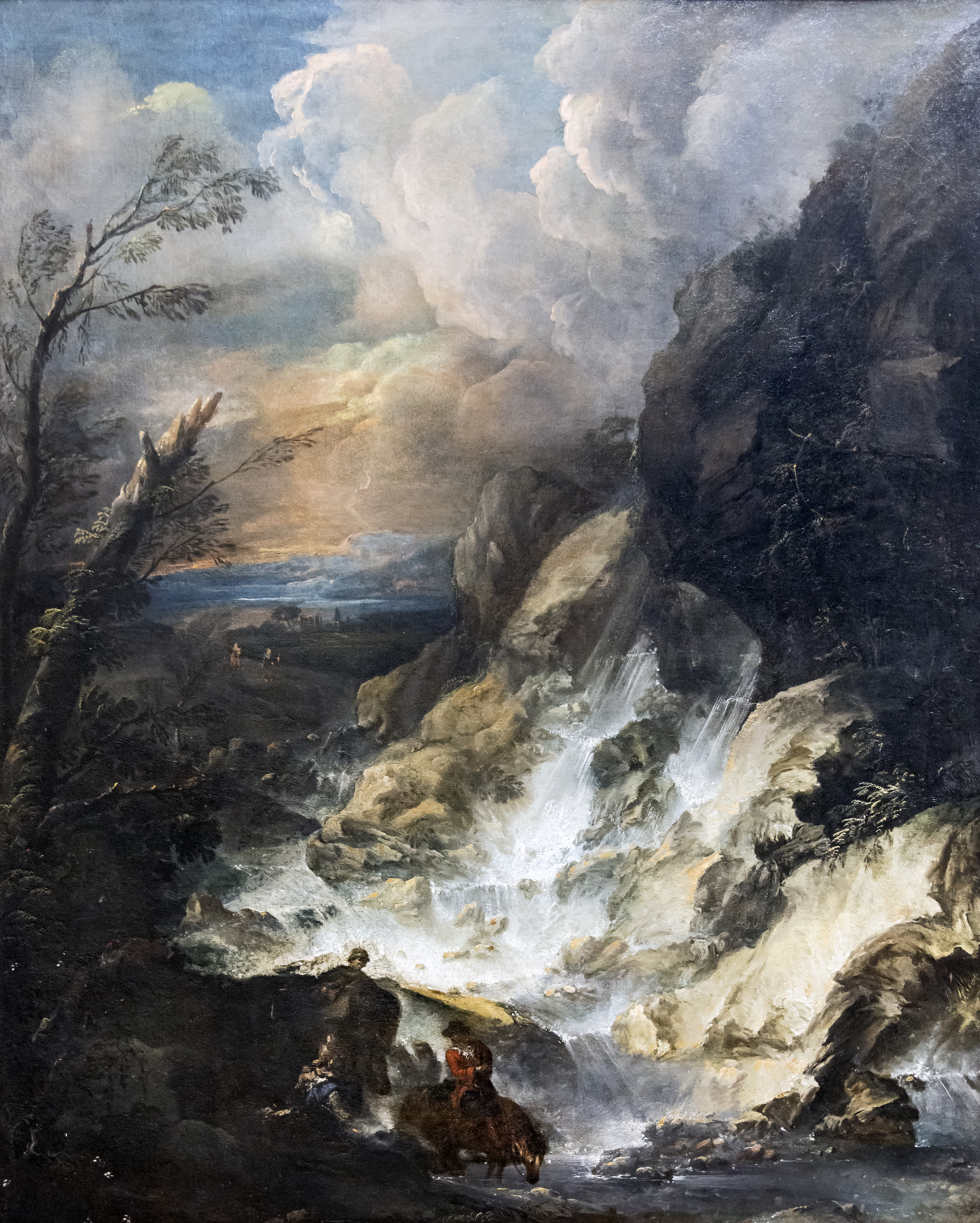
Waterfall, Gallerie dell'Accademia, Venice.

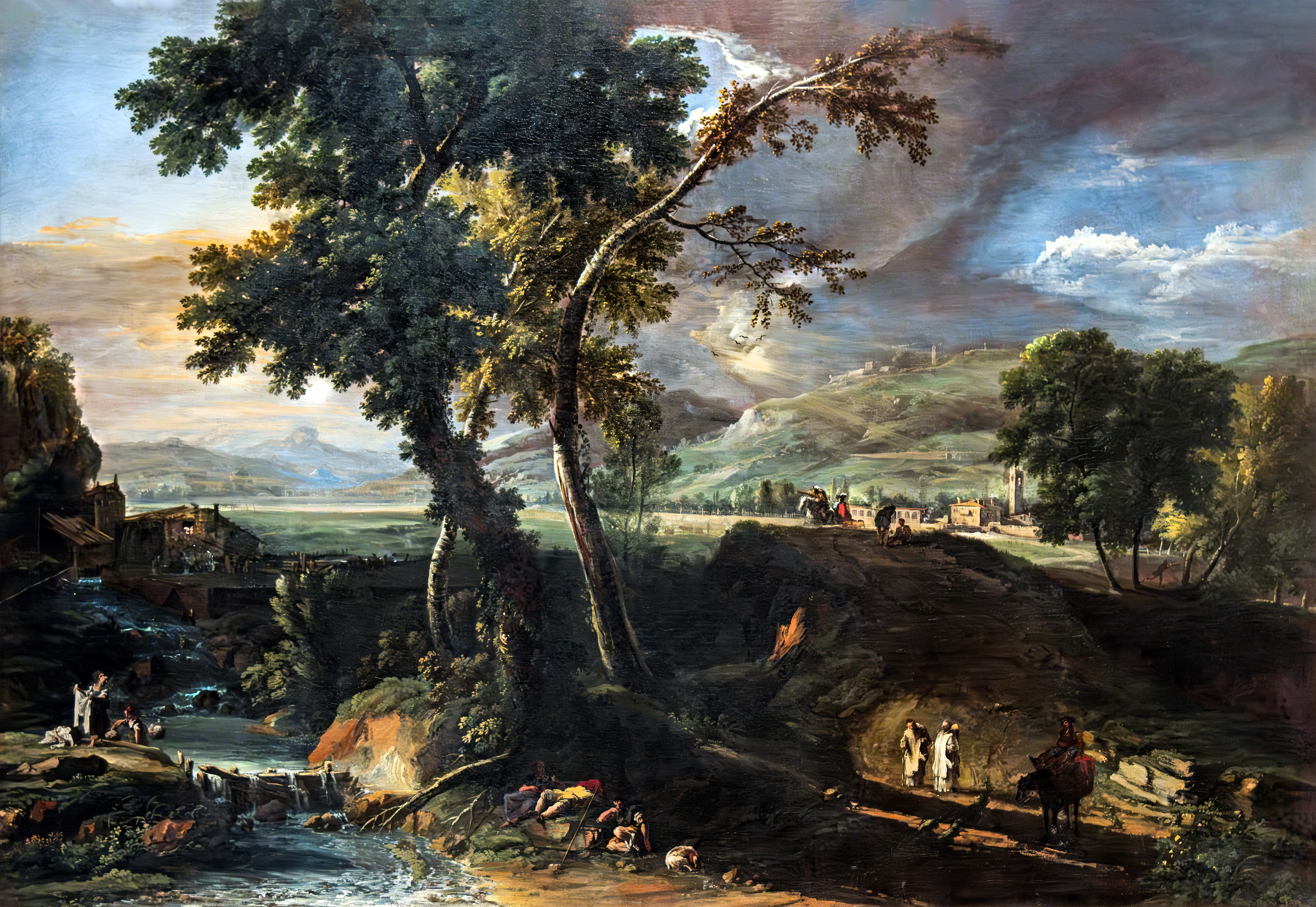
Landscape with River and Figures. 1715. Galleria dell'Accademia, Venice.

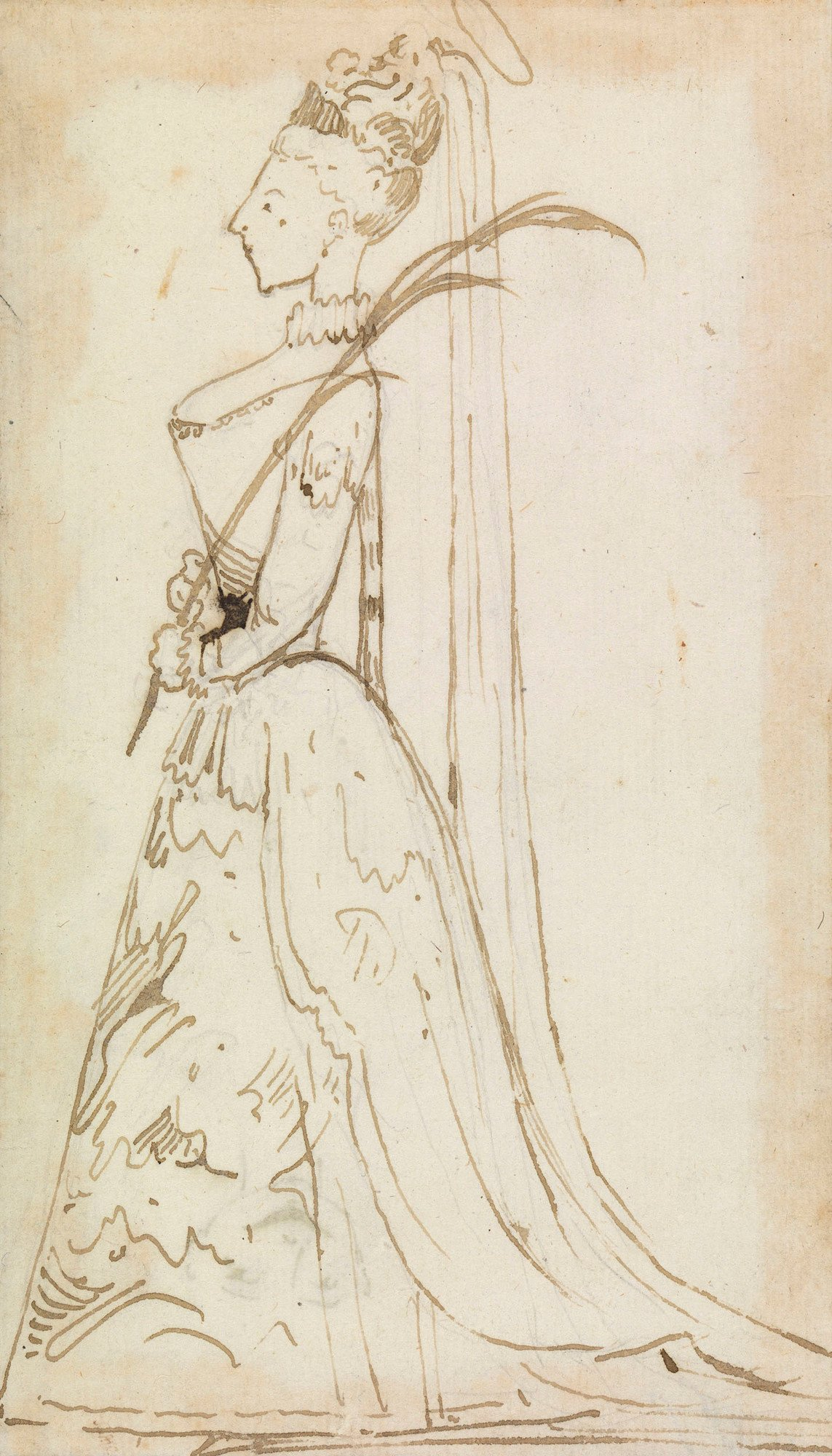
Caricature of opera singer Maria Giustina Turcotti, Print Room, Windsor
