= Tilley (surname) =

Tilley is an English surname. Notable people with the surname include:

- Arthur Augustus Tilley (1851–1942), academic of the University of Cambridge
- Benjamin Franklin Tilley (1848–1907), officer in the United States Navy
- Cecil Edgar Tilley (1894–1973), Australian–British petrologist and geologist.
- Christopher Tilley, British archaeologist
- Edward Tilley (Mayflower passenger) (1588–1620/1), Mayflower passenger and signer of the Mayflower Compact
- Elspeth Tilley, Australian playwright, actor and academic
- Jack L. Tilley (born 1948), 12th Sergeant Major of the U. S. Army
- John Tilley (Mayflower passenger) (1571–1621), Mayflower passenger and signer of the Mayflower Compact
- Sir John Tilley (1813–1898), Secretary to the General Post Office
- Sir John Anthony Cecil Tilley (1869–1952), British ambassador
- Kaat Tilley (1959–2012), Belgian fashion designer
- Leonard Percy de Wolfe Tilley (1870–1947), 21st Premier of New Brunswick
- Matt Tilley (born 1969), Australian radio presenter and comedian
- Patrick Tilley (1928–2020), British science fiction author
- Samuel Leonard Tilley (1818–1896), politician in the Canadas
- Sandra Tilley (1943–1981), U.S. R&B and soul singer
- Steven Tilley (born 1971), Speaker of the Missouri House of Representatives
- Vesta Tilley (1864–1952), English male impersonator

== Fictional characters ==
- Eustace Tilley, the mascot of The New Yorker
- Renet Tilley, character in Teenage Mutant Ninja Turtles
