= John Tilley =

John Tilley may refer to:

- John Tilley (Mayflower passenger) (1571–1620/1), pilgrim on the Mayflower signer of the Mayflower Compact
- John Tilley, whose invention in 1813 gave rise to the Tilley lamp
- Sir John Tilley (civil servant) (1813–1898), Secretary to the UK's General Post Office
- John Tilley (baseball) (1854–1927), baseball player
- Sir John Tilley (diplomat) (1869–1952), British diplomat to Brazil and Japan
- John Tilley (entertainer) (1898–1935), British comic monologuist
- John Tilley (Labour politician) (1941–2005), British Labour Party politician
- John Tilley (Kentucky politician), American politician
