= Theodosia Trollope =

English poet, translator and writer (1816–1865)

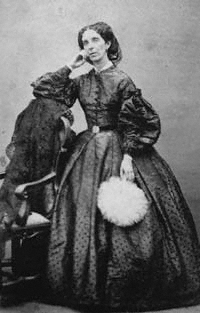
- Theodosia Trollope (from a book in Boston Library)
- Born: Theodosia Garrow; 28 November 1816; Torquay, Devon, England
- Died: 13 April 1865 (aged 48); Florence, Italy
- Occupation: Poet
- Spouse: Thomas Adolphus Trollope (m. 1848)
- Children: Beatrice Trollope
- Parent: Theodosia Abrams Fisher (mother)
- Relatives: Anthony Trollope (brother-in-law); Cecilia Tilley (sister-in-law); Frances Milton Trollope (mother-in-law); Harriett Abrams (aunt); Eliza Abrams (aunt)
- Writing career
- Genres: Poetry, translation, non-fiction

Theodosia Trollope (née Garrow; 28 November 1816 – 13 April 1865) was an English poet, translator, and writer known also for her marriage into the Trollope family. She married and bought a villa in Florence, Italy with her husband, Thomas Adolphus Trollope. Her hospitality made her home the centre of British society in the city. Her writings in support of the Italian nationalists are credited with changing public opinion.

== Early life ==
Theodosia Garrow was born in 1816 and raised in Torquay, Devon, England. Her parents were Joseph Garrow and the singer Theodosia Abrams Fisher. Her father was part Indian and he is known for making the first translation of La Vita Nuova by Dante Alighieri. Her mother was Jewish. This was the second marriage for her mother, who came to the marriage with two children from her deceased husband, a naval officer.

Garrow had her first poetry published in 1839 and she then contributed articles for a number of publications including Household Words published by Charles Dickens. Her poetry was lauded by Walter Savage Landor and compared to that of Elizabeth Barrett; however, Barrett herself did not feel the comparison was justified. Barrett wrote that Trollope's work was "flowingly & softly written, with no trace of the thing called genius".

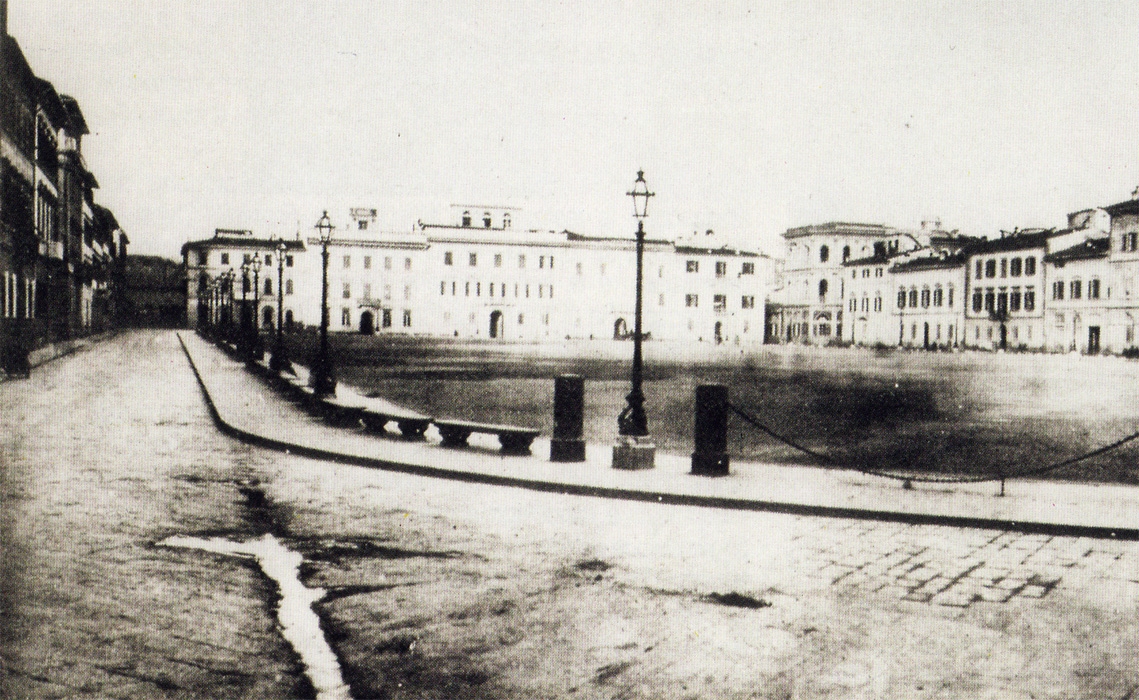
The Piazza Maria Antonia in 1860 when the Trollopes lived there

Trollope and her family went on a trip to Florence in 1844. Her father published his Dante translation in 1846. Whilst she was a guest of Fanny Trollope, she met and married Fanny's son Thomas Adolphus Trollope (brother of the writer Anthony Trollope).

== Personal life ==
After their marriage, they had a daughter, Beatrice, who was born in March 1853. The couple made their Italian household into a leading location; it was visited by the visiting British intelligentsia as well as leading Italian figures. "Mrs Trollope" was a celebrated hostess. She lived with her daughter, her husband and his mother at the Villino Trollope on the square that was then called the Piazza Maria Antonia and is now called the Piazza dell'Indipendenza in Florence. Their house was decorated by carved furniture, inlaid walls, majolica ceramics, marble floors and pillars, suits of armour and a 5,000-book library.

Their new villa was bought in part by Theodosia's inheritance. It was the Villino Trollope that was compared with the renown of Sir Horace Mann's house and hospitality. Their house was considered the centre of the ex-patriate society in Florence. Theodosia Trollope made one of the most well-known salons in Italy, which could be found in the "Villino Trollope".

The Trollopes' daughter played with Pen, the son of Robert and Elizabeth Barrett Browning, after they also took residence at Casa Guidi and became part of the Anglophone society of Florence in 1847. Comparisons of the two households concluded that the atmosphere of the Browning household was more intense whilst the Trollopes' was a more carefree environment. Theodosia was considered similar in character to Elizabeth Barrett Browning and all of her guests were in danger of appearing in some disguised way in Fanny's novels.

Theodosia Trollope died in 1865 and was buried in the English Cemetery in Florence where four other members of the Trollope family were interred. Her husband later went on to marry the American-born Frances Eleanor Trollope.

== Writing career ==
Theodosia was known for her poetry, her translations and her articles on household matters, although she also contributed letters to the Athenaeum advocating freedom for Italy. These articles, which pointedly disregarded the Pope, lauded the Italian nationalists. Her articles are credited with encouraging popular British support for the emergence of Italy as a nation. The American Atlantic Monthly reported in 1864 on Theodosia's poor health, citing it as the reason her intellectual gifts had not been more widely appreciated. Her gift for languages was noted in that she could understand Italian nearly as well as her first language. Before she married Thomas Adolphus Trollope, she published several works. Furthermore, her skills developed at a very young age. She became a famous and well-known writer quickly through her writings for the Italian independence. Most of her contributions were offered through different translations. Trollope translated an Italian nationalist play by Giovanni Battista Niccolini and excerpts from the poet Giuseppe Giusti and the activist Francesco Dall'Ongaro. Both of these writers were Italian nationalists and these excerpts from Trollope helped unite the English community with the Italian community.

== Works ==
=== Poems ===
==== Published in Countess of Blessington's Heath's Book of Beauty ====
- 1839 – The Gazelles and On Presenting a Young Invalid with a Bunch of Early Violets
- 1841 – Song of the Winter Spirits
- 1842 – On a Portrait of Her Majesty
- 1847 – The Cry of Romagna

==== Published in Keepsake ====
- 1841 – Imagine's Reward: A Legend of the Rhine
- 1842 – The Doom of Cheynholme
- 1843 – The Lady of Ashynn
- 1846 – She is not Dead but Sleepeth
- 1847 – Lethe Draught

=== Translations ===
- 1846 – Arnold of Brescia: A Tragedy. The original writer of this art work was the Italian poet and patriot Giovanni Battista Niccolini.
- 1847– The English Heart to the Roman Pontiff

=== Letters ===
• 1861 – Social Aspects of the Italian Revolution, in a Series of Letters from Florence: With a Sketch of Subsequent Events up to the Present Time

== Achievements ==
One of her greatest achievements occurred in 1861 when her twenty-seven papers, which were previously written for "Athanaeum", were reprinted and renamed as "Social Aspects of the Italian Revolution". This was an important achievement since it contributed towards the struggle for the Italian Freedom. Another one of her achievements was that she was able to inform other people about the events and problems during the Italian Revolution.
