= KAAT =

KAAT may refer to:

- the ICAO code for Alturas Municipal Airport
- KAAT (FM), a radio station (103.1 FM) licensed to Oakhurst, California, United States
- Kaat (given name)
- Jim Kaat (born 1938), American baseball broadcaster and former player
