= Trollope =

The name Trollope is derived from the place-name Troughburn, in Northumberland, England, originally Trolhop, Norse for "troll valley". The earliest recorded use of the surname is John Andrew Trolope (1427–1461) who lived in Thornlaw, Co. Durham and Sir Andrew Trollope (died 1461) who was an English soldier during the later stages of the Hundred Years' War and at the time of the Wars of the Roses.

Spelling variations of this family name include Trollop, Trollope, Trolloop, Trollup, Trollupe, and others.

Notable Trollopes include:

- Andrew Trollope (died 1461), English professional soldier
- Anthony Trollope (1815–1882), English novelist and civil servant
- Arthur William Trollope (1768–1827), English cleric, headmaster of Christ's Hospital
- Charles Trollope (1808–1888), British general
- Edward Trollope (1817–1893), English antiquary and Anglican Bishop of Nottingham
- Frances Eleanor Trollope (1835–1913), English novelist, second wife of Thomas Adolphus Trollope
- Frances Milton Trollope (1780–1863), English novelist, mother of Thomas Adolphus Trollope and Anthony Trollope
- Henry Trollope (1756–1839), Royal Navy admiral
- Joanna Trollope (1943–2025), English novelist
- John Trollope, 1st Baron Kesteven (1800–1874), President of the English Poor Law Board
- John Trollope (footballer) (born 1944), English association football player
- John Lightfoot Trollope (1897–1958), British First World War flying ace
- Mark Trollope (1862–1930), Anglican Bishop in Korea
- Paul Trollope (born 1972), Welsh football coach and former professional footballer
- Robert Trollope, 17th-century English architect
- Rowan Trollope (born 1972), Canadian business administrator, former Group President, Symantec Corporation
- Theodosia Trollope (1816–1865), English poet, translator and writer, first wife of Thomas Adolphus Trollope
- Thomas Trollope, 3rd Baron Kesteven (1891–1915), British aristocrat
- Thomas Adolphus Trollope (1810–1892), English writer
- William Trollope (1854–1895), English cricketer
