= Theodosia Abrams Fisher =

English contralto singer (1770–1849)

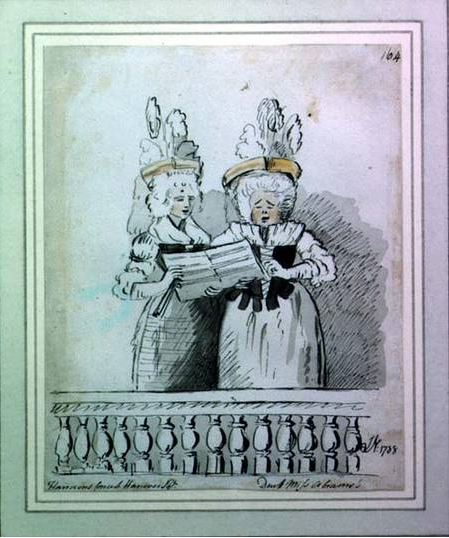
A duet by Miss Harriet and Miss Theodosia Abrams, Harrison's Concert, Hanover Square, by John Nixon

Theodosia Garrow (née Abrams, later Fisher, finally Garrow; ca. 1770 – 4 November 1849) was an English contralto who performed with her sisters, Harriett, Eliza and Jane Abrams. She was considered, with Margaret Kennedy, the leading female contralto of her time, and abandoned a promising career upon her marriage.

== Early life ==
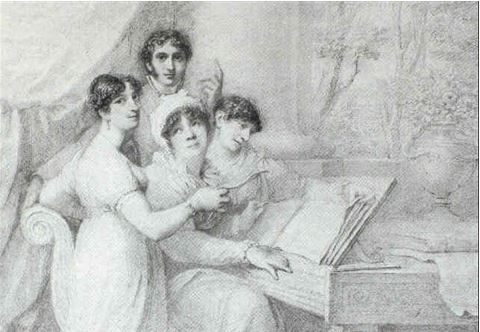
John Braham with Harriet Abrams and their two daughters, Harriet and Theodosia Abrams

The daughter of John Braham and Harriet Abrams, Theodosia Abrams was born into a Jewish family that probably moved to England following an Hanoverian minister to the English court. John Braham with Harriet Abrams and their two daughters, Harriet and Theodosia Abrams, were portrayed in a pencil with watercolour in around 1800s by Richard Cosway. All the family were interested in music and nine siblings were professional musicians. Harriett (ca. 1762–1821), Georgiana (Miss G.), Jane (ca. 1767–1814), Flora and Theodosia were singers, Eliza (born ca. 1777) was a singer and pianist, Charles and William were violinists, and David Abrahams (1775–1837) was a violinist and singer. Other siblings, John, Charlotte (born ca. 1758), who married John Lucas, and Thomas never performed in public.

In 1791 five of the Abrams sisters converted to the Catholic church: Charlotte, Harriett, Jane, Theodosia and Eliza.

== Career ==
Harriett Abrams made her debut on 28 October 1775 at Drury Lane, with a piece written for her by David Garrick and music by Thomas Arne. Her sister Miss G. joined her during the 1778–80 seasons. Harriett Abrams left the stage in 1780 and performed in concert series and festivals in London and the provinces. She appeared as soloist and with one of her sister, probably Georgiana and later Jane, who started her career in 1782.

In 1783 a concert of Ancient Music advertised the singers as Miss Abrams, Miss Abrams Jun. and Miss T. Abrams (probably Theodosia). Theodosia Abrams sang the contralto part in the quintet from Handel's Jephtha. Harriett, as soprano, and Theodosia, as contralto, sang again in 1784 Handel Memorial concerts at Westminster Abbey and the Pantheon. In 1785 Theodosia and Harriett Abrams were listed as main female singers in Charles Burney's An Account of the Musical Performances in Commemoration of Handel. In 1788 Theodosia Abrams was a soloist at the Oxford Music Room and at the Tottenham Street Concert House.

Eliza Abrams started her career as solo pianist in 1788 and from 1790 sang with Harriett and Theodosia.

In 1794 Joseph Doane lists in his Musical directory: Harriett Abrams, singer, Theodosia Abrams, singer, Charles Abrams, cellist, and William Abrams, violinist, all living at 73 Charlotte Street, Rathbone Place.

From 1781 to 1796, Harriett Abrams organised a yearly concert of Ancient Music, first at Tottenham street, then at Hanover Square, and for the last two years at the Opera House, Haymarket. Other than family members, Harriett Abrams employed leading singers and musicians: Joseph Haydn played the piano in 1792, 1794 and 1795. John Baptist Cramer, composer and pianist, was a soloist in 1782, and said that Theodosia Abrams "could pick out a wrong note on any instrument in a full orchestre".

Harriett Abrams was also a composer of glees and ballads like Orphan's Prayer and Crazy Jane, sung by her sister, Theodosia. Theodosia Abrams abandoned a promising career upon her marriage; she was considered, with Margaret Kennedy, the leading female contralto of her time. Harriett Abrams' last song in 1803 was dedicated to Queen Charlotte, "with Her Majesty's most Gracious Permission". The Abrams siblings were friends with brothers and actors John Philip Kemble, Charles Kemble and Sarah Kemble.

After Theodosia's marriage to Joseph Garrow, the family was involved with the St. John's Chapel, Torquay. In the late 1830s Joseph Garrow arranged Sacred Music for four voices, later printed in London with a dedication to John Sheepshanks, Archdeacon of Cornwall and former curate of St John's Chapel, Torquay, who formed the choir. It included music by Beethoven, Mozart, Weber and others, and also eight hymns tunes by Joseph Garrow and tunes or chants by Eliza Abrams, Theodosia Garrow, Theo Garrow (Theodosia and Joseph's daughter) and Harriett Fisher.

== Family ==
On 6 August 1794, at St Maurice, Plympton, Theodosia Abrams married Captain Thomas Fisher (1773 – June 1810) of the Devonshire Militia. He was the son of the rector of Little Torrington, North Devon, from 1773 to 1803. They had two sons, Charles (b. 1806) and Harriett Theodosia, named after Theodosia Abrams' sister. Harriett Theodosia Fisher, baptised at Plympton, Devon on 4 November 1809, died from smallpox in Florence on 12 November 1848, just seven months after she moved there to live with her sister. She is buried with her family at English Cemetery, Florence. Strangely for the time, her maid, Elizabeth Shinner (1811–1852), is buried beside her.

Theodosia Abrams secondly married a much younger man (by at least 19 years), Joseph Garrow, a magistrate in Torquay, on 17 March 1812 at St Margaret, Westminster. Joseph Garrow was born on 29 October 1789 at Fort St George, Madras, the son of Joseph Garrow, a secretary to the Commander-in-Chief for the East India Company, and an Indian woman, Sultana. He was orphaned when he was only three and raised by his father's sister, Eleanora Garrow. His grandfather was Rev. David Garrow, rector of Hadley, Middlesex, a schoolmaster for 50 years. His uncle was William Garrow, the English barrister. Joseph Garrow attended St John's College, Cambridge, and practiced as a lawyer at Lincoln's Inn starting in 1810. They had one daughter, Theodosia Garrow (1816–1865), who married Thomas Adolphus Trollope (1810–1892) in April 1848 in Florence.

Harriett and Eliza Abrams lived with their sister Theodosia at the Braddons, Torquay, while instead Jane Abrams moved from Devon to London, Park Lane.

Theodosia Garrow died on 4 November 1849 in Torquay. Joseph Garrow went back to live in Florence with his daughter Theodosia Trollope, and is buried there with his daughter and stepdaughter.
