= Kaat (given name) =

Kaat is a given name. Notable people with the name include:

- Kaat Dumarey (born 1999), Belgian acrobatic gymnast
- Kaat Hannes (born 1991), Belgian road cyclist
- Kaat Tilley (1959–2012), Belgian fashion designer
- Kaat Van Daele (born 1989), Belgian figure skater
- Kaat Van der Meulen (born 1995), Belgian racing cyclist
