= Francesco Dall'Ongaro =

Italian writer, poet and dramatist (1808–1873)

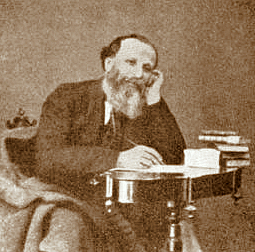
- Born: Francesco Dall'Ongaro (1808–1873)
- Occupations: Writer, poet, dramatist

Francesco Dall'Ongaro (Italian: [franˈtʃesko dalˈloŋɡaro]; 1808–1873) was an Italian writer, poet and dramatist.

== Biography ==
Born in Mansuè, on 19 June 1808, Dall'Ongaro was educated for the priesthood, but abandoned his orders, and taking to political journalism founded the Favilla at Trieste in the Liberal interest.

In 1848, he enlisted under Garibaldi, and next year was a member of the assembly which proclaimed the republic in Rome, being given by Mazzini the direction of the Monitor officiate.

On the downfall of the republic, he fled to Switzerland, then to Belgium and later to France, taking a prominent part in revolutionary journalism; it was not until 1860 that he returned to Italy, where he was appointed a professor of dramatic literature at Florence. He corresponded with Alexandre Dumas and collaborated with Niccolò Tommaseo. Subsequently, he was transferred to Naples, where he died on 10 January 1873.

His patriotic poems, Stornelli, composed in early life, had a great popular success; and he produced a number of plays, notably Fornaretto, Bianca Cappello, Fasma and Il Tesoro. Some of his work was translated into English by Theodosia Trollope. His collected Fantasie drammatiche e liriche were published in his lifetime. In 1863 Francesco Dall'Ongaro presented his Italian drama, The Resurrection of Prince Marko.
