= Richard Cosway =

English painter (1742–1821)

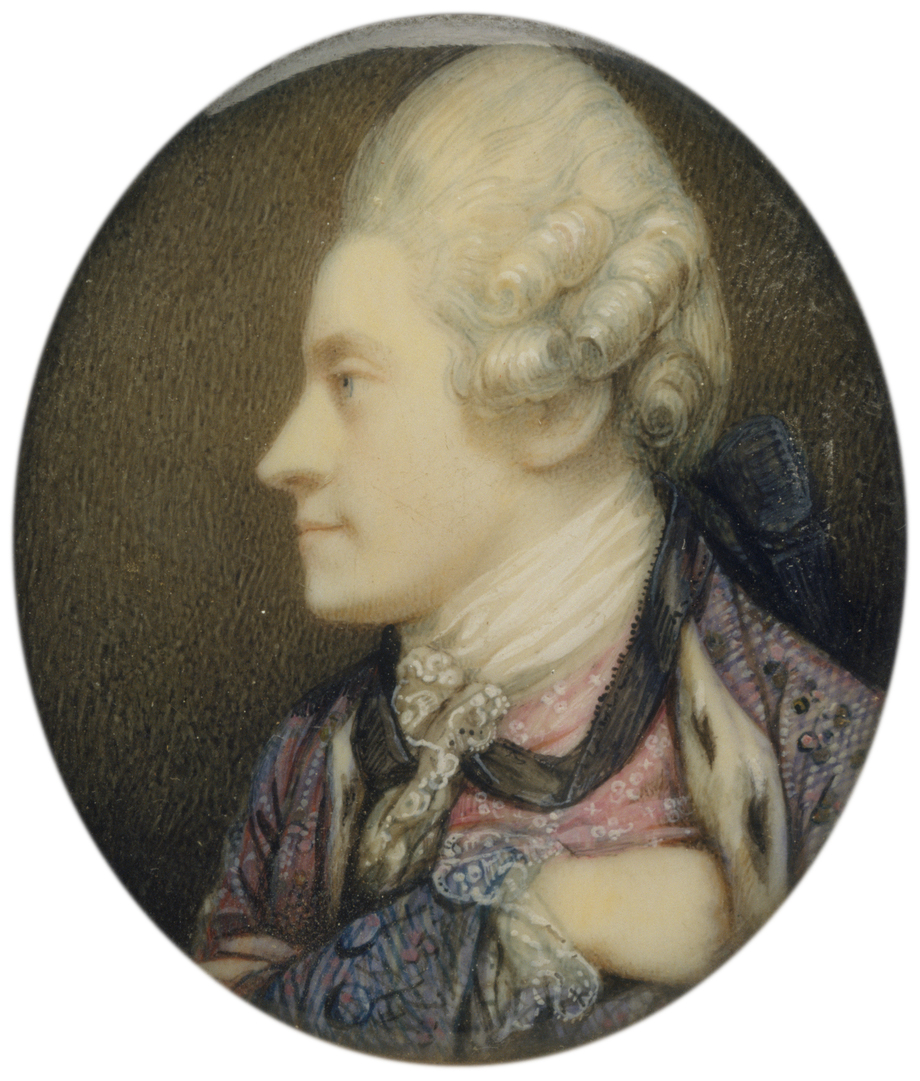
- Self-portrait in miniature, c. 1770
- Born: 5 November 1742; Tiverton, England
- Died: 4 July 1821 (aged 78); London, England
- Education: Thomas Hudson; William Shipley
- Known for: Painter of portrait miniatures
- Spouse: Maria Cosway (m. 1781)

Richard Cosway RA (5 November 1742 – 4 July 1821) was a leading English portrait painter of the Georgian and Regency era, noted for his miniatures. He was a contemporary of John Smart, George Engleheart, William Wood, and Richard Crosse. He befriended fellow Freemasons and Swedenborgians William Blake and Chevalier d'Éon. His wife was the Italian-born painter Maria Cosway, a close friend of Thomas Jefferson.

== Early years ==
Richard Cosway was born in Tiverton, Devon, the son of a schoolmaster. He was initially educated at Blundell's School, where his father was master, but at the age of twelve he was allowed to travel to London to take lessons in painting. Soon after his arrival, in 1754, he won a prize from the Society of Arts. He studied briefly with fellow Devonian Thomas Hudson, then with William Shipley, and by 1760 had established his own business. He exhibited his first works at the age of 20 in 1762 and was soon in demand.

He was one of the first group of associate members of the Royal Academy, elected in August 1770, and was elected a full member the following March, on the casting vote of the academy's president, Sir Joshua Reynolds. He is included in Johan Zoffany's group portrait of the members of the academy (begun in 1771); a late addition to the composition, he was painted on an extra strip of canvas, attached to the right-hand side of the painting.

== Career in art ==
He painted the future King George IV in 1780 and was appointed Painter to the Prince of Wales in 1785—the only time this title was ever awarded. His subjects included the Prince's first wife, Maria Anne Fitzherbert, and various English and French aristocrats, including Madame du Barry, mistress of King Louis XV.

Cosway's pupils included Andrew Plimer (1763–1837).

From 1995 to 1996, the National Portrait Gallery in London held an exhibition entitled Richard and Maria Cosway: Regency Artists of Taste and Fashion, with 250 works on display.

== Personal life ==
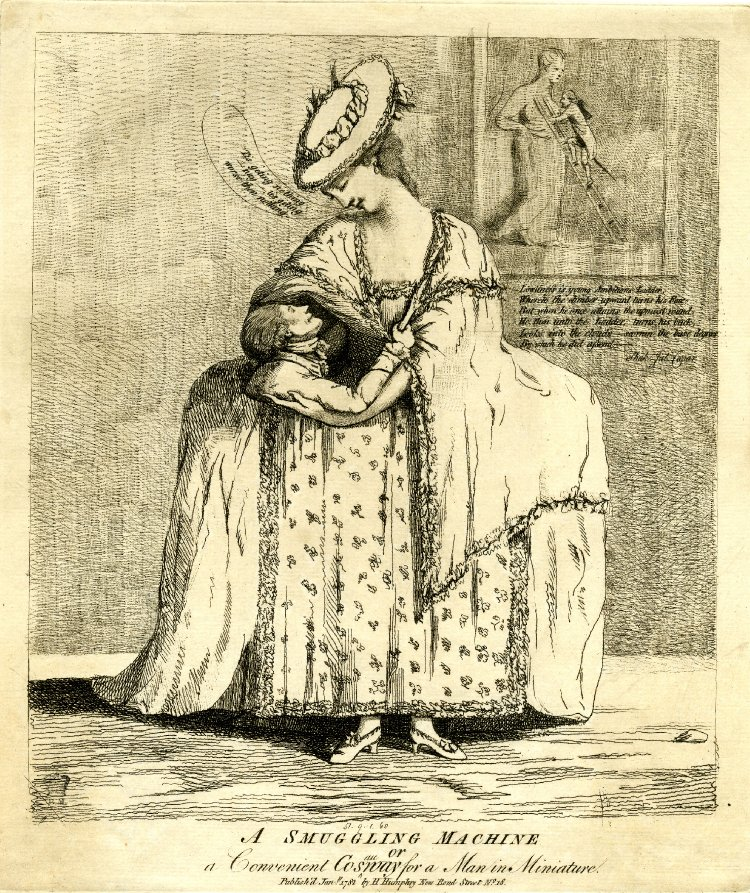
A SMUGGLING MACHINE or a Convenient Cos(au)way for a Man in Miniature. A 1782 etching satirising the relationship between Cosway and his wife. Published by Hannah Humphrey.

On 18 January 1781, Cosway married the Anglo-Italian artist Maria Hadfield. Maria was a composer, musician and authority on girls' education and was much admired by Thomas Jefferson, who wrote letters to her decrying her marriage to another man and kept an engraving made from one of Cosway's paintings of Maria at Monticello.

The Cosways' marriage is thought to have been an arranged marriage of convenience, and not only due to his being 20 years her senior. Richard Cosway was an effeminate Macaroni with "a mincing, affected air" dressed in the height of fashion: "His small plain person was to be seen in all the public places clothed in a mulberry silk coated embroidered with scarlet strawberries, with a sword and bag and small three-cornered hat perched on the top of his powdered toupée." It was also said he was "well known as a libertine and commonly described as resembling a monkey."

In 1784, the Cosways moved into Schomberg House, Pall Mall, which became a fashionable salon for London society. They employed the former slave Ottobah Cugoano as a servant. In 1791 they moved to a larger house in Stratford Place. In 1821, after selling most of the treasures he had accumulated, he went to reside in Edgware Road.

In later life, Cosway also suffered from mental disorders and spent some time in various institutions. He died in London in 1821 and was buried at St Marylebone Parish Church. Sir John Soane bought more than 30 objects put up for sale at auction after Cosway's death.

Cosway's wife Maria survived him many years, and died in Italy in January 1838, in a school for girls which she had founded, and which she had attached to an important religious order devoted to the cause of female education, known as the Dame Inglesi. She had been created a baroness of the Empire on account of her devotion to female education by the emperor Francis I of Austria in 1834.

== Examples of Cosway's work ==
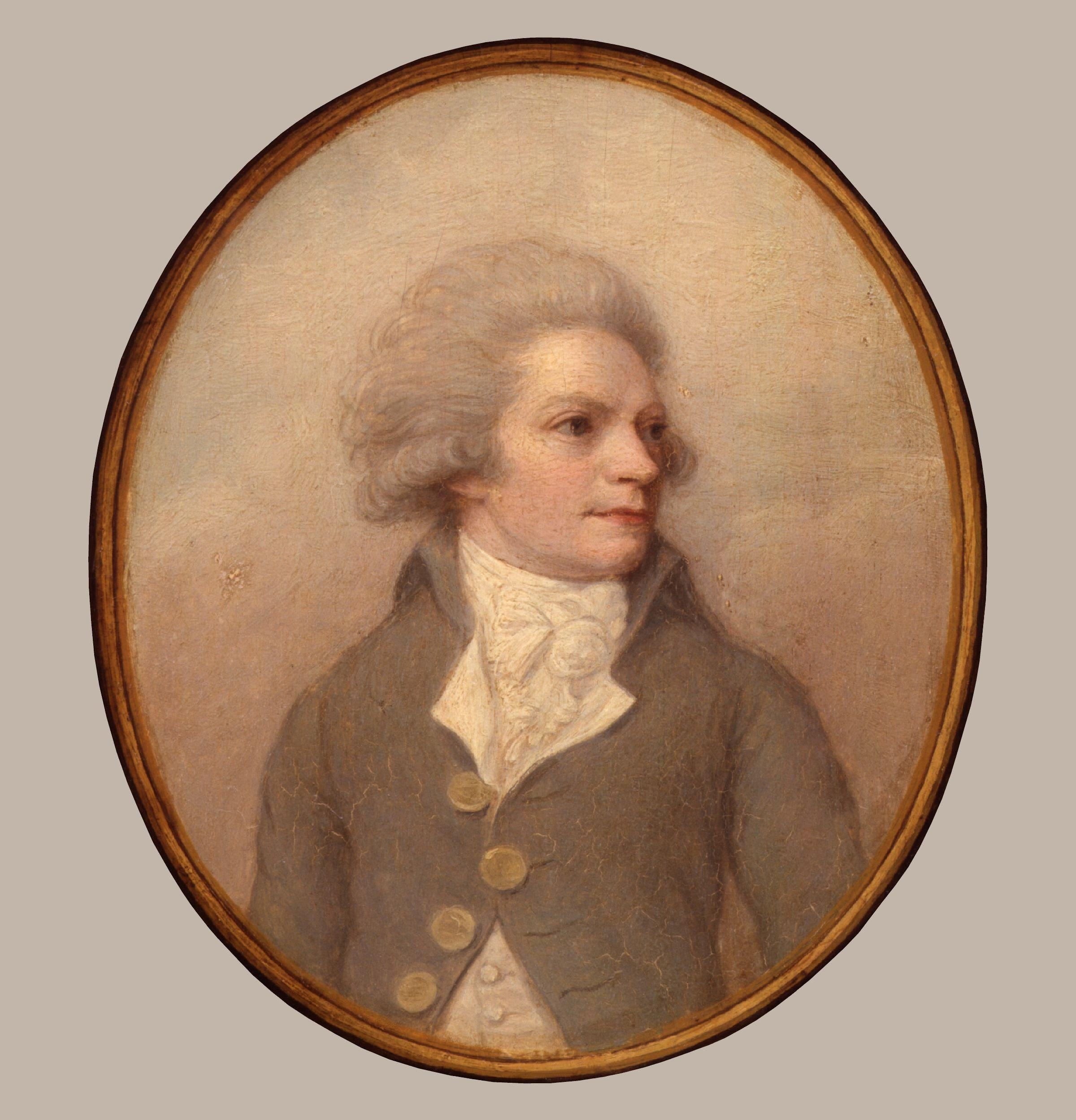
1790 copy of a Self-Portrait of Richard Cosway - National Portrait Gallery, London

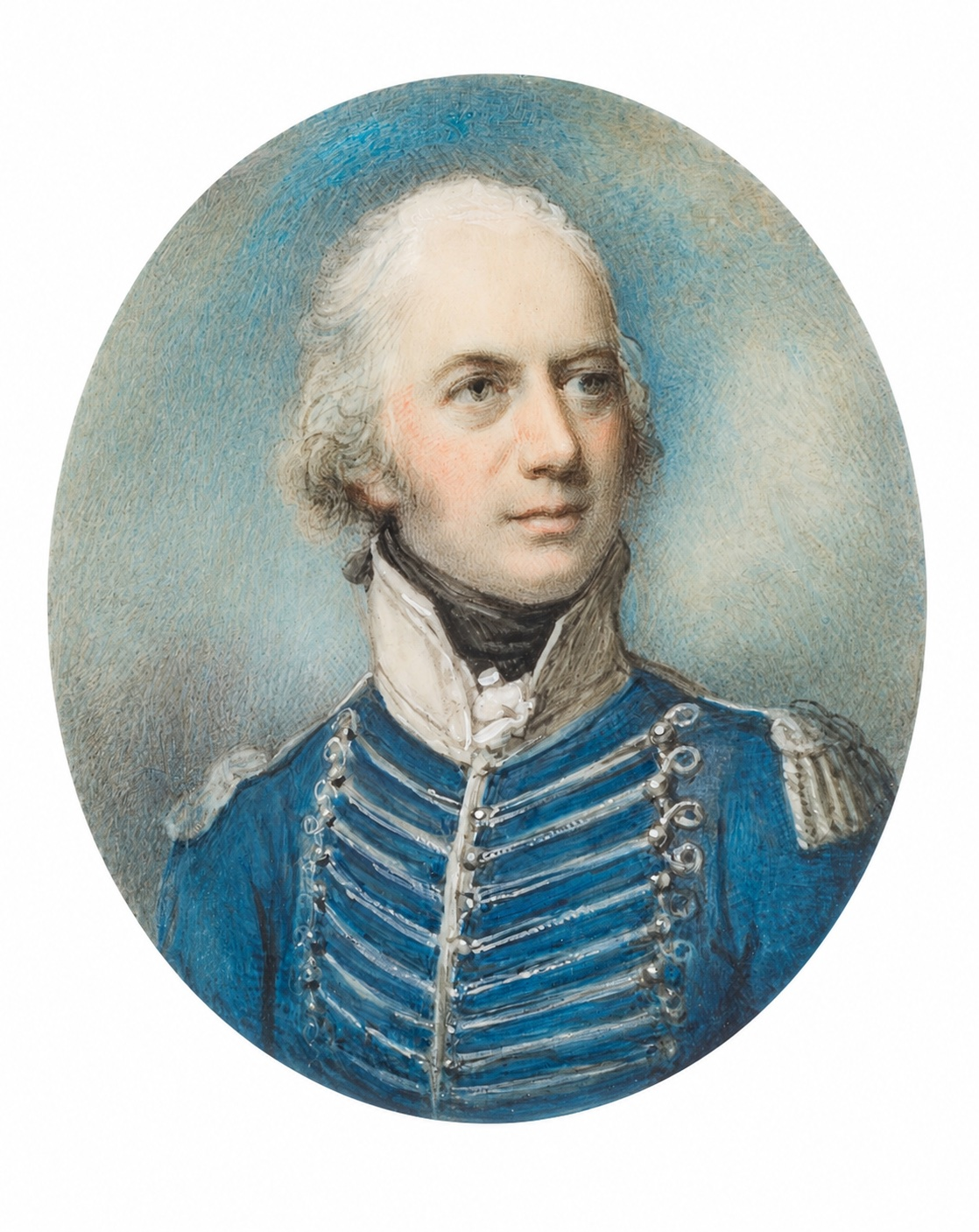
Portrait of General William Loftus, dated ca. 1794, Kunst Museum Winterhur.

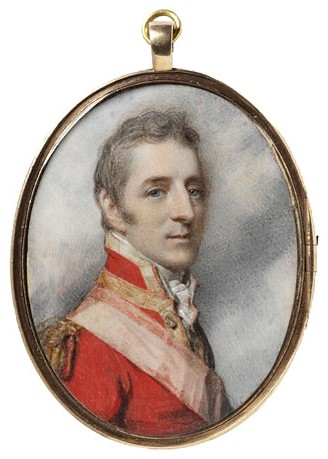
Portrait of Arthur Wellesley, later Duke of Wellington, Dated 1808, by Richard Cosway, RA, 1742–1821, Watercolour on ivory V&A Museum no. P.6-1941 Victoria and Albert Museum

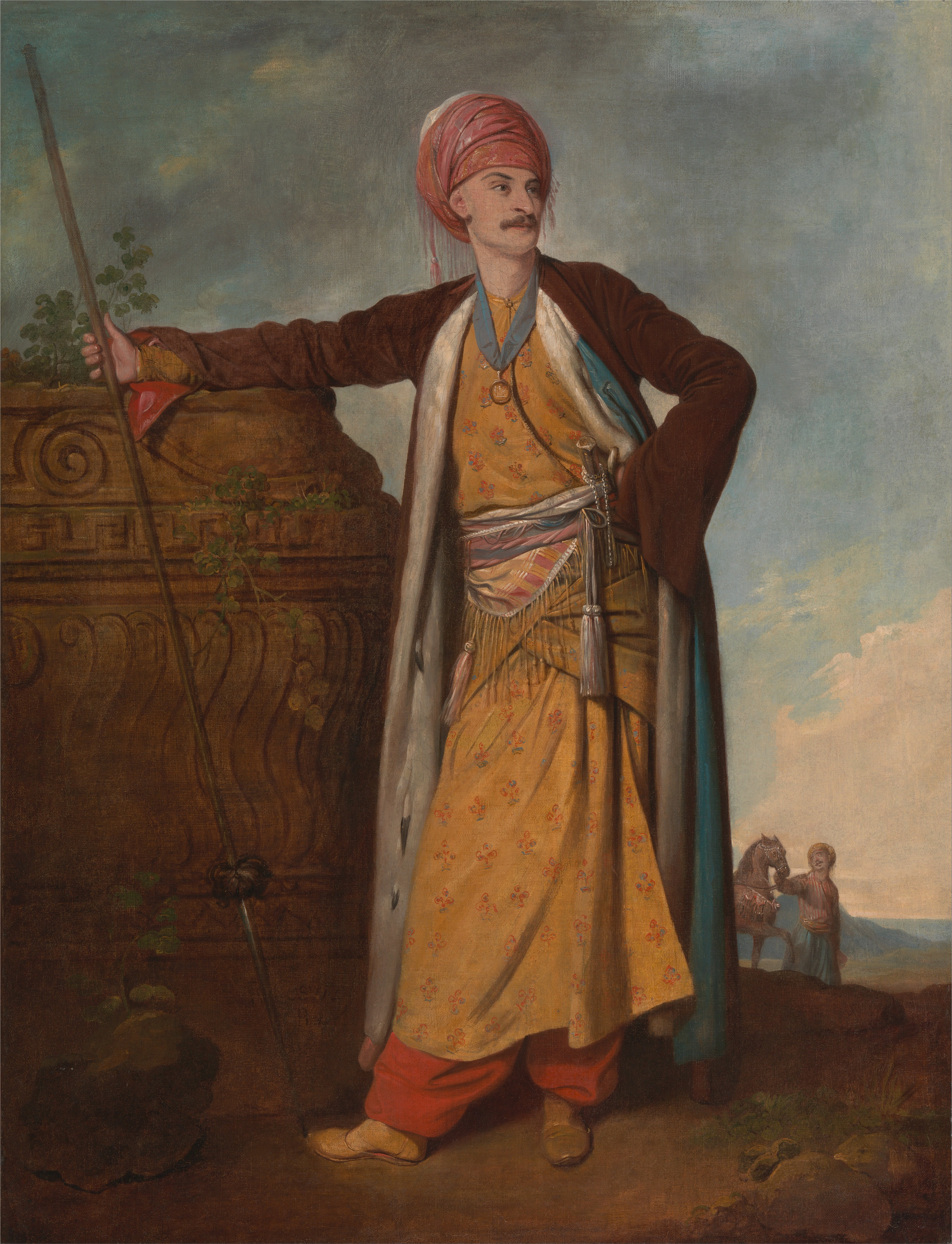
Portrait of an Armenian

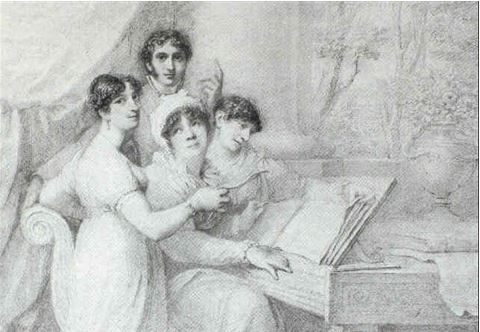
John Braham with Harriet Abrams and her two daughters, Harriett Abrams and Theodosia Abrams

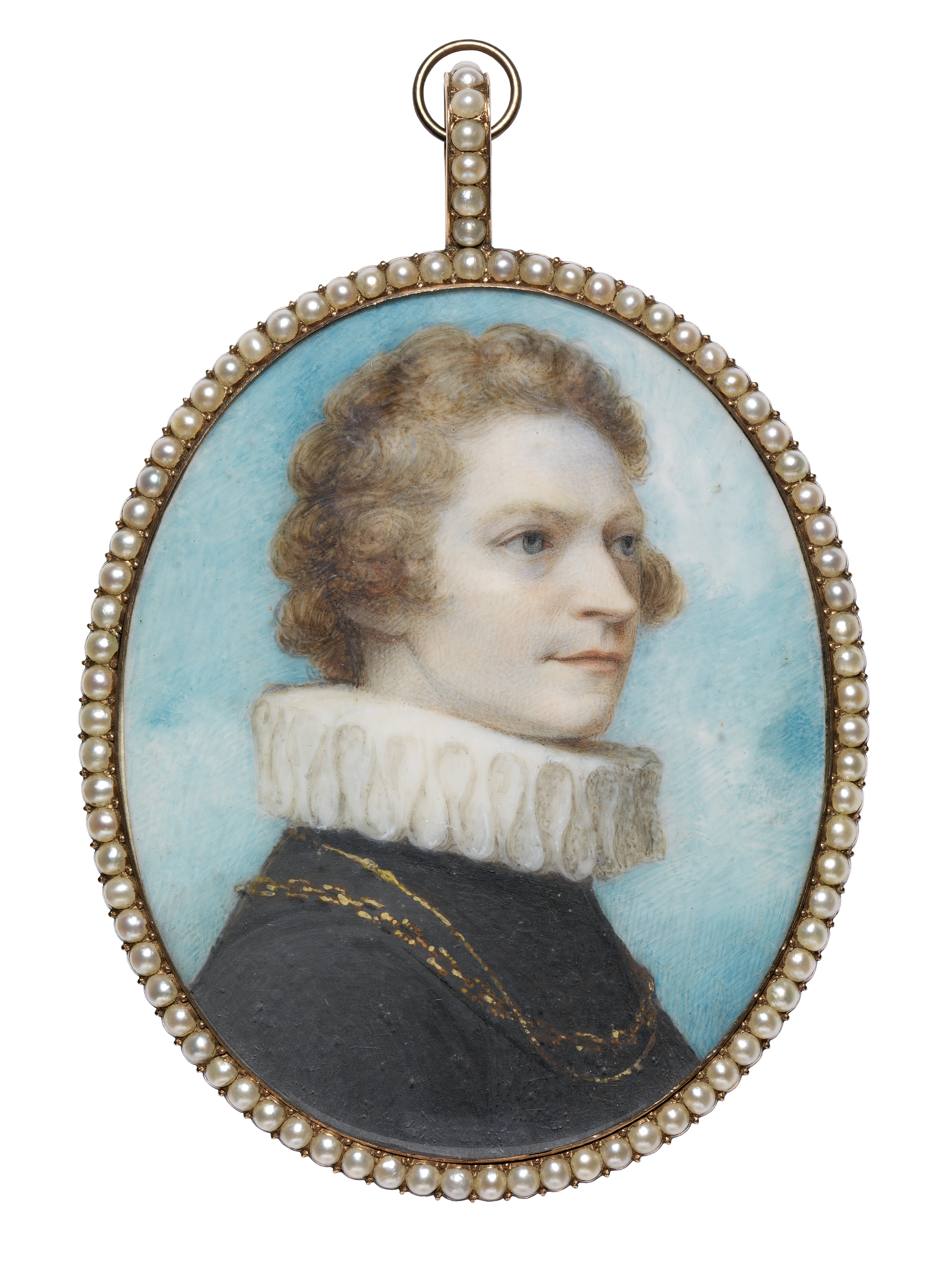
Self-Portrait in Elizabethan Costume, circa 1790
