= Little Boy Blue =

English nursery rhyme

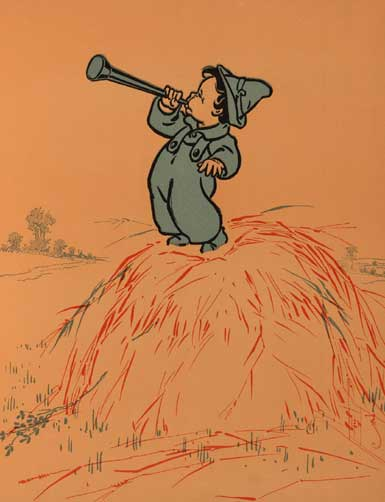
Illustration by William Wallace Denslow, 1901

"Little Boy Blue" is an English-language nursery rhyme. It has a Roud Folk Song Index number of 11318.

== Words ==
One version of the rhyme runs:

Little Boy Blue, come blow your horn.
The sheep's in the meadow, the cow's in the corn.
Where is the boy who looks after the sheep?
Under a haystack, fast asleep.
Will you wake him? No, not I,
For if I do, he will surely cry.

== Origins and meaning ==
The earliest printed version of the rhyme is in Tommy Thumb's Little Song Book (c. 1744), but the rhyme may be much older. It may be alluded to in Shakespeare's King Lear (III, vi) when Edgar, masquerading as Mad Tom, says:

Sleepest or wakest thou, jolly shepheard?
Thy sheepe be in the corne;
And for one blast of thy minikin mouth
Thy sheepe shall take no harme.

A suggestion that Little Boy Blue was intended to represent Cardinal Wolsey is rejected by the scholars Iona and Peter Opie in The Oxford Dictionary of Nursery Rhymes. Another suggestion by George Homans in English Villagers of the 13th Century, is that Little Boy Blue was a hayward: "The hayward's horn, his badge of office, must have been used to give warning that cattle or other trespassers were in the corn."

A published musical version of 1799, described as "a favourite glee for 3 voices composed by Miss Abrams", sets just the opening quatrain:

Little Boy Blue, come blow me your Horn,
The Cow's in the Meadow, the Sheep in the Corn,
What's gone with the Boy that looks after the Sheep?
He's under the haycock fast asleep.
