= Arthur Augustus Tilley =

British academic (1851–1942)

Arthur Augustus Tilley (1 December 1851 – 4 December 1942) was an academic of the University of Cambridge. An Old Etonian, his first subject at Cambridge was Classics, after which he began a career as a barrister. He returned to his old college to teach Classics, going on to specialise in French literature and becoming both a literary critic and a historian.

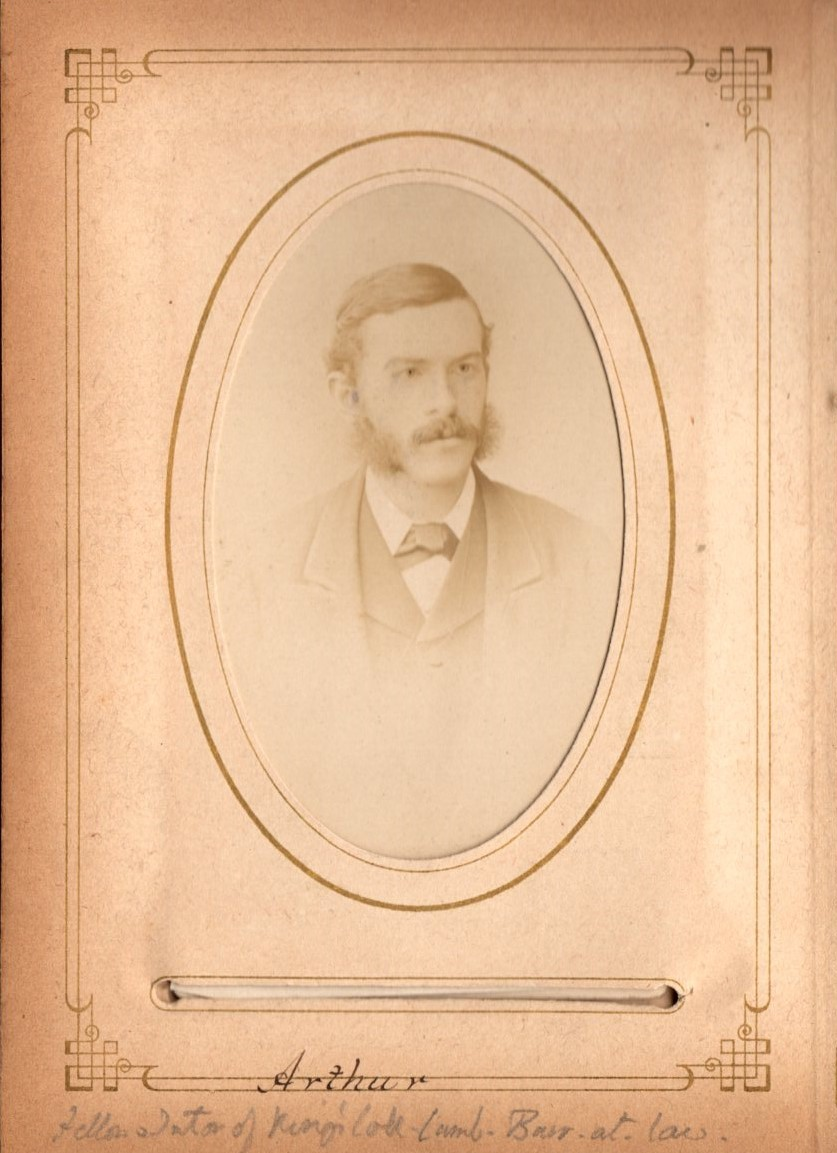
Arthur Augustus Tilley

Tilley is remembered at Cambridge for resisting the modernisation of behaviour and dress which he observed, describing the new elements in his college as "bounders".

== Early life ==
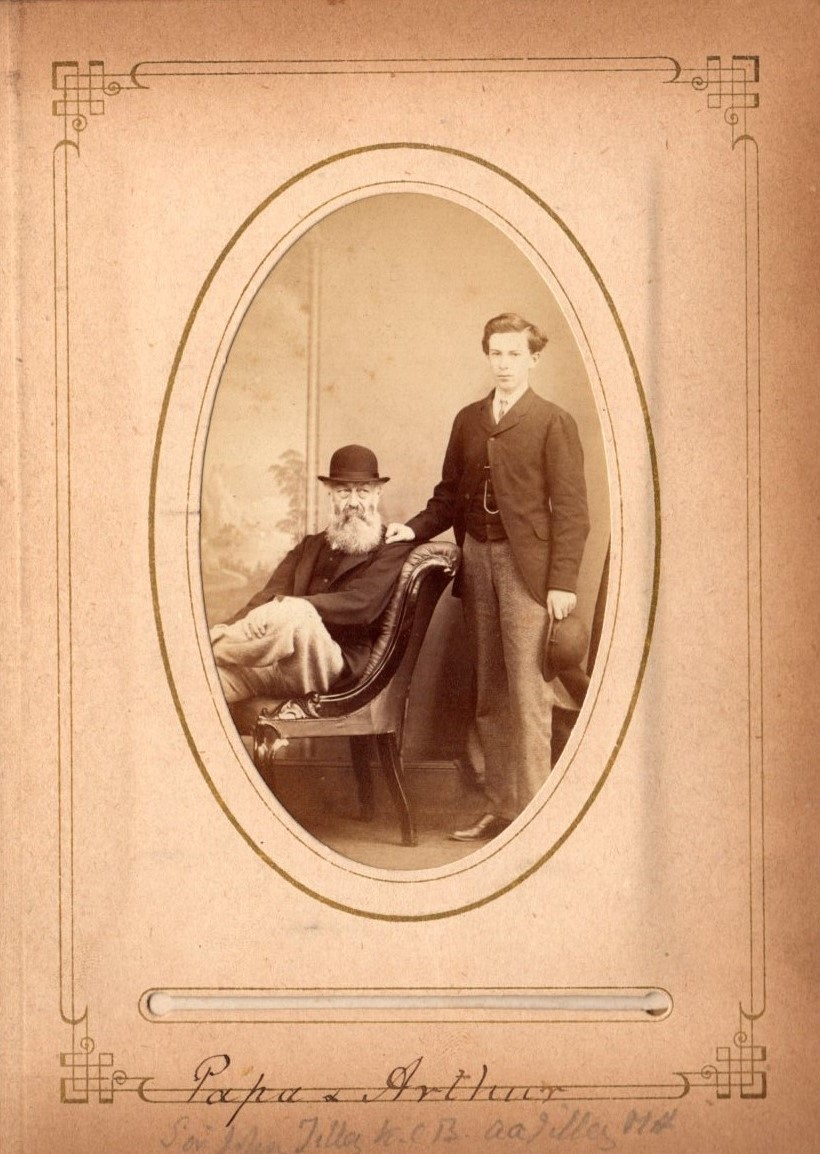
Sir John Tilley & Arthur Augustus Tilley

Tilley was the only child of Sir John Tilley, Secretary to the General Post Office, by his marriage to Mary Ann Partington, who was his second wife. Tilley's father had been married firstly, in 1839, to Cecilia Trollope, a favourite sister of the novelist Anthony Trollope, who sometimes stayed with the Tilleys in Cumberland. Cecilia Tilley had died in 1849, having had five children, of whom four died soon after her. In 1861 Tilley's father married thirdly Susannah Anderson Montgomerie, with whom he had one daughter and two further sons, Tilley's half-brothers: William George Tilley, born in 1863, and John Anthony Cecil Tilley, later a British ambassador, born in 1869.

The young Tilley was educated at Eton College, where he was celebrated as "Scholar of the Year" for 1871, winning both the Newcastle Scholarship for Classics and the Tomline Mathematical Prize. Tilley went on to King's College, Cambridge, where in 1875 he came second in the Classical Tripos. He was then admitted to the Inner Temple, studied for a career in the law, and was called to the Bar.

== Career ==
Tilley was elected a Fellow of his old college, King's, in 1876 and later was also a lecturer there. He did not turn his back on the law until 1882, when Anthony Trollope wrote to his wife Rose: "Arthur has given up the bar for good & all: – is to live at Cambridge." In 1883, he became Junior Tutor of King's. Although not a reactionary, he was very keen on good form and correct dress, and was critical of the behaviour of the growing number of members of the college who failed to respect them. As Junior Tutor he invited all sorts to dinner, as he felt he should do, but after one such occasion said to Arthur Benson "Thank God my bounders' dinner is over!"

In 1884, Tilley was still a tutor and lecturer for the Classical Tripos, and in that year he penned a valedictory:

The old type of scholarship, the name by which we have been accustomed to know 'a minute acquaintance with the niceties of the dead languages', is rapidly passing away from us. No longer is the skilful emendation of a Greek play the royal road to a bishopric; no longer do grave statesmen and men of learning beguile their leisure moments with doing Humpty Dumpty into Latin verse; a classical quotation in the House of Commons is almost an event; a false quantity falls there on unheeding ears.

In 1890, Tilley resigned as Junior Tutor of King's College after being held responsible for inciting the throwing into the college fountain of the "long-haired Kingsman" Robbie Ross. Ross developed pneumonia as a result of the incident and subsequently left Cambridge without graduating.

Apart from a number of important literary studies, Tilley was editor of the academic journals Medieval France and Modern France. In 1903 he published a history of the Reformation in France, as part of the Cambridge Modern History.

His later work included two chapters for the Cambridge Medieval History, one entitled The Early Renaissance (in volume 7, 1932) and the other The Renaissance in Europe (in volume 8, 1936). Denys Hay later commented that "Looking back on this presentation of the Renaissance the most striking feature is its desultory character... an amalgam of assertions of broad principles with antiquarian observation of detail, in which the structure of society and politics was all but ignored... In short, the Renaissance is neither explained nor interpreted".

Tilley married Margaret, daughter of J. A. Clutton-Brock, and they had one son and three daughters. Their son, Captain John Tilley, 7th Bn. Norfolk Regiment, died on 28 November 1916 and was buried at Faubourg D'Amiens Cemetery, Arras, France. Arthur died on 4 December 1942, three days after his 91st birthday, and at the time of his death was living at number 2, Selwyn Gardens, Cambridge.

== Major publications ==
- The Literature of the French Renaissance (1904)
- François Rabelais (1907)
- From Montaigne to Molière (1908)
- The Dawn of the French Renaissance (1918)
- Cambridge Readings in French Literature (1920)
- Molière (1921)
- Studies in the French Renaissance (1922)
- The decline of the age of Louis XIV: or, French literature, 1687–1715
- Three French Dramatists: Racine, Marivaux, Musset (1933); 2016 pbk reprint. ISBN 978-1-316-62604-7.
- Madame de Sévigné: some aspects of her life and character
- Medieval France: a companion to French studies, vol. 5 (1922)
- The Reformation in France in Cambridge Modern History vol. II The Reformation: The end of the Middle Ages (1903)
- The Early Renaissance in Cambridge Mediaeval History, vol. 7 (1932)
- The Renaissance in Europe in Cambridge Mediaeval History, vol. 8 (1936)
