= Cecilia Tilley =

British novelist (1816–1849)

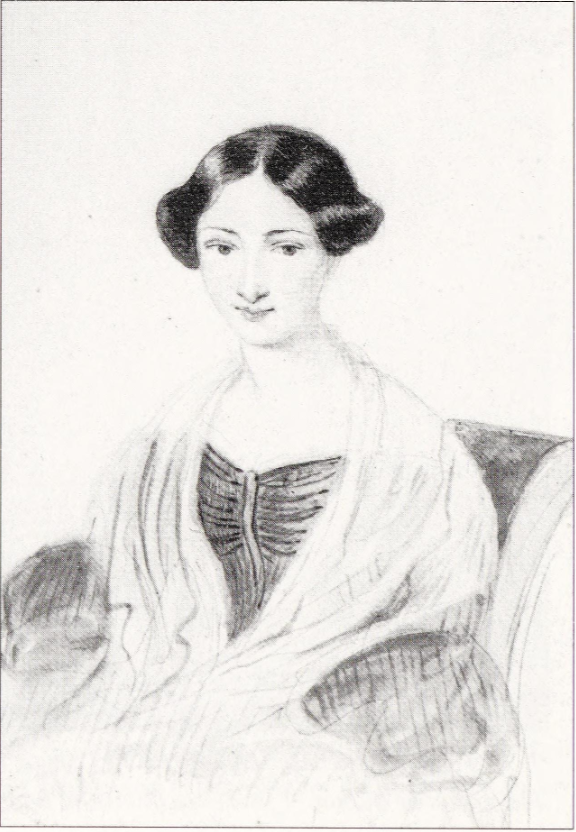
- portrait by Auguste Hervieu
- Born: 1816
- Died: 4 April 1849 (aged 32–33); Kensington
- Occupation: Novelist
- Spouse(s): John Tilley
- Children: 5
- Parent(s): Thomas Trollope; Frances Milton Trollope
- Relatives: Anthony Trollope, Thomas Adolphus Trollope

Cecilia Frances Trollope Tilley (1816 – 10 April 1849) was a British novelist. She was the daughter of novelist Fanny Trollope and the sister of novelist Anthony Trollope.

Cecilia Trollope was one of seven children of Fanny Trollope and her husband, barrister Thomas Anthony Trollope. In 1839, she married John Tilley, a friend of her brother Anthony who later became Secretary to the General Post Office of the United Kingdom. They had five children.

Tilley published a single book under the pseudonym "By a Lady", the high church novel Chollerton: A Tale of Our Own Times (1846).

Cecilia Tilley died of tuberculosis on 10 April 1849 in Kensington.
