= John Tilley (entertainer) =

- Born: John Mounsey Thomson; 1898; Edmonton, Middlesex, England
- Died: 3 August 1935 (aged 36); Hemel Hempstead, Hertfordshire, England
- Occupation: Comic entertainer
- Years active: 1932–1935

John Mounsey Thomson (1898 – 3 August 1935), who performed as John Tilley, was a British stage and radio comic monologuist.

He was born in Edmonton, London; his father J. F. Thomson was a Scottish international amateur footballer. He served in the Gordon Highlanders and Royal Flying Corps, before losing money in an antiques business venture. He then studied medicine, but failed his examinations, and worked in various jobs including bank clerk, salesman, and advertising man. He attempted to sell advertising space to a theatre manager, who spotted his potential, and suggested that he perform his rambling, "inconsequential and lugubrious monologues" on stage.

He took the stage name Tilley in memory of an old friend, and his performances became an immediate success. He appeared at the Windmill Theatre, and married Kathleen More, one of the theatre staff. He first broadcast on BBC radio in early 1932, billed as "The Mutterer". He also made several recordings of his monologues between 1933 and 1935, including "The Loch Ness Monster", "London Transport Board", "Cycling", and "The Scoutmaster", for the Columbia record label. The actor Eric Barker praised Tilley for his "subtlety and his meticulously considered characters", and called him "a great comedian".

Tilley became ill in 1934, and underwent a kidney operation, but died in Hemel Hempstead in 1935, aged 36, after a career in entertainment of less than three years.
