= Harriett Abrams =

English soprano and composer

Harriett Abrams (c. 1758 – 8 March 1821) was an English soprano and composer. Particularly praised for her performances in the repertoire of George Frideric Handel, Abrams enjoyed a successful concert career in London during the 1780s. Music historian Charles Burney praised the sweetness of her voice and her tasteful musical interpretations.

== Biography ==
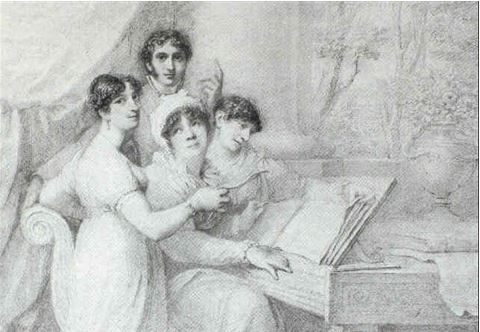
John Braham with Harriet Abrams and her two daughters, Harriet and Theodosia Abrams by Richard Cosway

Abrams was born in Torquay into a large musical family of Jewish descent. Her younger sister Theodosia Abrams Fisher (d Torquay, 4 November 1849) was a professional contralto and her youngest sister Eliza Abrams (d Torquay, 21 August 1831) was also a concert soprano and pianist. Other family relatives included Miss G. Abrams, who sang at the Theatre Royal, Drury Lane with Harriett's for two seasons and sang in concerts in the early 1780s; Jane Abrams, who first sang in a benefit concert organized by Harriet in 1782; William Abrams, who played the violin; and Charles Abrams, who played the cello. The violinist Flora Abrams may have also been a relative but the connection is uncertain.

Abrams studied singing, music theory, and composition with composer Thomas Arne before make her professional opera début as the little gypsy in May-Day, or The Little Gipsy on 28 October 1775 at the Theatre Royal, Drury Lane in London. The opera was written specifically for her by librettist David Garrick and Arne who composed the music. Although possessing a fine voice, Abrams had little stage personality and spent most of her career as a concert performer.

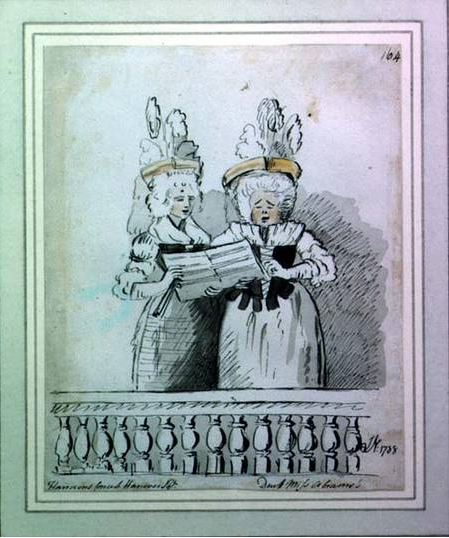
A duet by Miss Harriet and Miss Theodosia Abrams, Harrison's Concert, Hanover Square, by John Nixon

After five years performing at Drury Lane, Abrams became a principal singer at the fashionable London concerts and provincial festivals, appearing regularly from 1780 to 1790. She notably sang annually in the Handel Commemoration in Westminster Abbey in 1784 and annually in the Handel festivals from 1784 to 1787. She also sang at the opening of the Concerts of Ancient Music in 1776 and returned there frequently through 1790. Abrams also appeared in various concert series organized by John Ashley, Venanzio Rauzzini, and Johann Peter Salomon and often performed in concerts and recitals with her sister Theodosia. The Public Advertiser, while praising Harriett's work as a soloist, commented in 1783 that the "Forte of the Sisters … lives manifestly in Duettos". During the 1790s Harriet's public performances became infrequent and she mostly appeared in private concerts with both her sisters. She did, however, give annual benefit concerts open to the public in 1792, 1794 and 1795 which were accompanied by Joseph Haydn on the piano.

Abrams composed several songs, two of which, "The Orphan's Prayer" and "Crazy Jane", became very popular; she was also responsible for setting the nursery rhyme Little Boy Blue as a glee for three voices. In addition, she published two sets of Italian and English canzonets, a collection of Scottish songs and glees harmonized for two and three voices, and more than a dozen songs, mainly sentimental ballads. A collection of songs published in 1803 was dedicated by Harriett to Queen Charlotte.
