= John Tilley (diplomat) =

British diplomat (1869–1952)

Sir John Tilley GCMG GCVO CB PC
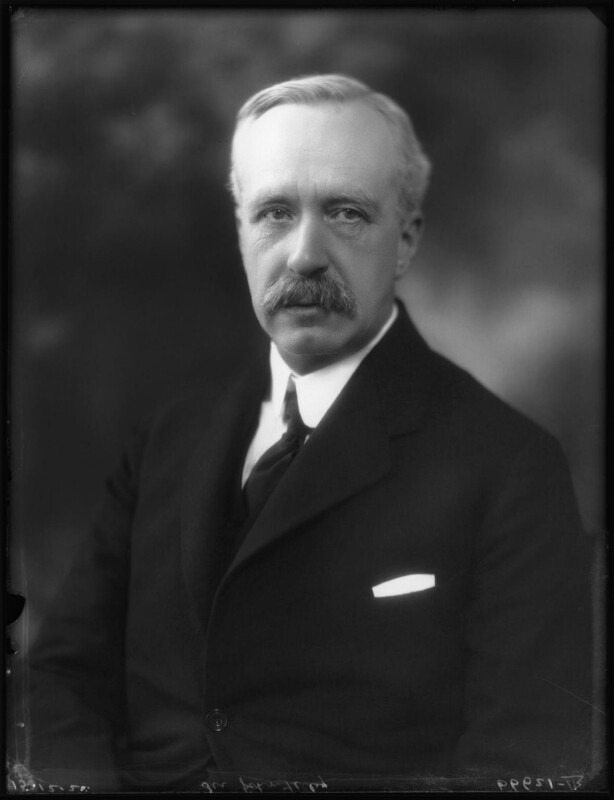
- Tilley in 1925

British Ambassador to Japan
- In office 1926–1931
- Monarch: George V
- Prime Minister: Stanley Baldwin; Ramsay MacDonald
- Preceded by: Sir Charles Eliot
- Succeeded by: Sir Francis Oswald Lindley

British Ambassador to Brazil
- In office 1921–1925
- Monarch: George V
- Prime Minister: David Lloyd George; Bonar Law; Stanley Baldwin; Ramsay MacDonald
- Preceded by: Sir Ralph Paget
- Succeeded by: Sir Beilby Alston

Personal details
- Born: January 1869
- Died: 5 April 1952 (aged 83)
- Spouse: Edith Honoria Montgomery-Cuninghame (m. 1901)
- Parent: Sir John Tilley (father)
- Education: King's College, Cambridge (BA, MA)

Sir John Anthony Cecil Tilley GCMG GCVO CB PC (January 1869 – 5 April 1952) was a British diplomat. He was British Ambassador to Brazil from 1921 to 1925, and Ambassador to Japan from 1926 to 1931.

== Early life ==
Born on 21 or 31 January 1869, Tilley was the ninth child and fourth son of Sir John Tilley, Secretary to the General Post Office, by his third marriage, to Susannah Anderson Montgomerie. She was the grand daughter of Alexander Montgomerie; daughter of William Eglinton Montgomerie of Annick Lodge and Greenville, Ayrshire by his marriage to Susanna Fraser Anderson and great niece of Hugh Montgomerie, 12th Earl of Eglinton. Tilley was the half brother of Arthur Augustus Tilley. and godson of Anthony Trollope.

Before being awarded a scholarship to Eton, Tilley attended a preparatory school at Thorpe Mandeville, Northamptonshire, and on 8 October 1887 entered King's College, Cambridge, where he graduated BA in 1890, proceeding MA in 1894. Between 1887 and 1889 he was editor of the Cambridge Review, an undergraduate magazine. He then prepared for the Foreign Office entrance examination. To improve his "moderately good" French he spent three months in a village near Tours, France. He then moved to live with a family in Dresden, Germany, to learn German, where he also learnt some Spanish. From Dresden, he returned to England and attended Scoones where he crammed for the Foreign Office entrance examination

On 7 September 1901 Tilley married Edith Honoria Montgomery-Cuninghame (1870–1949), eldest child of Sir William Montgomery-Cuninghame, 9th Baronet, by his marriage to Elizabeth Hartopp, daughter of Edward Bourchier Hartopp.

== Career ==
In 1893, Tilley took the Foreign Office examination and was appointed to the only available vacancy, where he was assigned as a junior to the Eastern Department "…dealing with the affairs of the Near and Middle East, including Russia, the Turkish Empire and Egypt." A year later, he was transferred to the Far Eastern Department. In 1899 he was appointed Second Secretary in Paris and, having done much of the preparatory translation work for the frontier dispute between Great Britain and Venezuela, also Secretary to the British Agent for the Boundary Arbitration (Venezuela Crisis of 1895) between British Guiana and Venezuela, also based in Paris. At the end of 1898, Tilley returned to the Foreign Office to work in the Consular Department.

In 1902, he became Secretary to the Committee on Consular Service, and in 1903 Secretary to the Committee of Imperial Defence. This was a temporary appointment and ended in June 1904 when George Clarke, 1st Baron Sydenham of Combe was appointed permanently to the position. On 3 August 1906 he was appointed Acting First Secretary in His Majesty's Diplomatic Service. In 1906, having obtained an exchange with a member of the Diplomatic Service Tilley was assigned as the First Secretary at the British Embassy in Constantinople, where he remained until 1908. Here he served under Nicholas Roderick O'Conor for whom Tilley felt great affection and admiration.

After promotion early in 1909, he was made Head of the African Department. At the end of 1909, he became British Plenipotentiary at the Brussels Arms Conference and at the beginning of 1910 Delegate to the Conference respecting frontiers between Uganda, German East Africa and Congo, held in Brussels. The representing Minister at this conference was Arthur Henry Hardinge. In 1912 he was Delegate to the African Liquor Conference, which was also held in Brussels. In October 1913 he was promoted to the Chief Clerk at the Foreign Office. He was also appointed Foreign Office representative on the Governing Body at the School of Oriental Studies.

1916 saw the formation of a committee to consider reform of the Diplomatic Service. As Chief Clerk, Tilley was appointed to this committee which resulted in the merger of the Diplomatic and Foreign Office Services and for the first time, allowances were paid to men serving abroad. Between 1919 and 1920 he remained in the Foreign Office as Assistant Secretary. Sir John attended Buckingham Palace on 21 December 1920, where he was sworn of his Majesty's Most Honourable Privy Council of the United Kingdom. Between 1921 and 1925 he was a head of mission as British ambassador to Brazil.

After a long leave, his final posting, from 1926 to 1931, was as Ambassador to Japan. Appointed Special Ambassador at the funeral of the Emperor of Japan (Emperor Taisho) when he received the Grand Cordon of the Rising Sun and later, at the enthronement of the new Emperor Hirohito, he was appointed Special Ambassador and the Paulownia Leaves were added to the Grand Cordon of the Rising Sun.

Tilley's final ceremonial duty before leaving Japan was to lay the foundation stone of Christ Church, Yokohama, built to replace the original church destroyed in an earthquake. Tilley and his family left Japan on 18 October 1930 taking a long journey via a number of countries home, into retirement.

In retirement, he lived at Felsham House, Bury St Edmunds, Suffolk, and was appointed a Justice of the Peace for the county.

== Selected works ==
- The Foreign Office (1933), 3 editions
- London to Tokyo (1942), 7 editions, the last in 1973

== Honours ==
- 1916: Companion of the Order of the Bath (CB)
- 1919: Knight Commander of the Order of St Michael and St George (KCMG)
- 1920: Privy Counsellor (PC)
- 1927: Knight Grand Cross of the Order of St Michael and St George (GCMG)
- 1927 Order of the Rising Sun, Grand Cordon
- 1928 Order of the Rising Sun, Grand Cordon with Paulownia Leaves
- 1929 Knight Grand Cross of the Royal Victorian Order (GCVO)

== See also ==
- List of Ambassadors from the United Kingdom to Japan
- Anglo-Japanese relations

== Notes ==
Diplomatic posts
Preceded by Sir Ralph Paget	British Ambassador to Brazil; 1921–1925	Succeeded by Sir Beilby Alston
Preceded by Sir Charles Eliot	British Ambassador to Japan; 1926–1931	Succeeded by Sir Francis Oswald Lindley
