= Kaat Tilley =

Belgian fashion designer

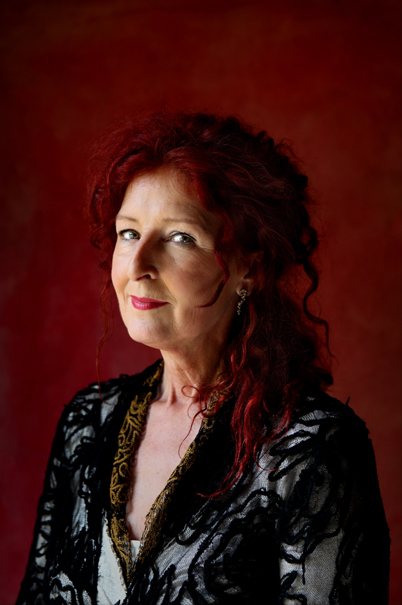
- Born: 20 September 1959; Mechelen, Belgium
- Died: 22 June 2012 (aged 52); Asse, Belgium

Kaat Tilley (20 September 1959 – 22 June 2012) was a Belgian Flemish fashion designer. Her work was characterized by dreamy and fairy-like designs with soft and flowing lines. Tilley grew up in Kapelle-op-den-Bos and was crazy about fairy tales as a child. The inaccessibility, strength, beauty and fragility of the fairy tale figure Snow White became her trademark. Tilley would regularly refer to this in her later visual work. Tilley was known for her romantic to fairy tale clothing, but she also designed jewellery collections, lighting, furniture, interior fabrics, uniforms and costumes for films and musicals.

== Early life and education ==
Born in Mechelen and raised in Kapelle-op-den-Bos, Tilley studied visual arts and painting at Sint-Lucas Brussels. Afterwards she followed the Fashion and Theatre Costume course at the Antwerp Fashion Academy. In 1983 she graduated Cum Laude with the collection "Mahler and Venice". She was a Laureate of the Golden Play and of the International Linen Competition 'Fil d’Or'.

== Career ==
In 1989, Tilley was diagnosed with lymphatic cancer which she overcame. Earlier that same year, she also opened a shop in the King's Gallery in Brussels. She had various clothing collections, including Back Lines, a collection with wedding and party clothes and Inner & Earthings, a ready-to-wear women's collection. In addition, there was the Escape line, a collection that was released in a cheaper fabric, Jersey, and design. In 1993, she designed the costumes for the film Antoine. Her children's line Frederiek was launched in 1995. This children's collection is named after her father, as the collection was launched shortly after her father's death. This children's collection was also sold in Galeries Lafayette in Paris. In addition, she had her first show at the Parisian prêt-à-porter week in 1997.

Tilley not only designed clothing, she also entered into a collaboration with Ad Lumen. For this, she designed her first lighting collection that matched the style of her clothing. The lamps were characterized by expressive and flowing lines. The lamps are made of copper and stainless steel. The glass for the lamps was mouth-blown, which ensured that they were always unique and different in shape. The copper was given an intense red color in different shades by heating, where there is no uniformity and depth was created. The lighting collection was part of a new way of working by Ad Lumen. They called on designers who have nothing to do with design and lighting. In addition, she also created a Fashion room for the Royal Windsor hotel, characterized by a chalky white color. In the meantime, she became an established name, as evidenced by the retrospective exhibition organized in the Gaasbeek Castle in 2005. Her new winter collection was inspired by the last resident of the castle; Marchioness Arconati Visconti.

In 2007, Tilley collaborated again with a brand outside the fashion scene. She was asked to embellish the Elnett hairspray spray can by L’Oréal with a drawing. She wanted to show a sophisticated, exceptionally feminine but above all liberated woman in her design. From 2007 onwards, Tilley organized exhibitions/experiences on her domain, a former water mill, in Asbeek (Asse). During these events, her creations were exhibited, but prototypes and paintings of hers were also sold. In 2009, the central theme of this exhibition/experience was Albino. While the exhibitions of the previous two years were mainly retrospective, in 2009 she showed exclusively new creations.

After the bankruptcy of her shops in Brussels and Antwerp in 2009, a relaunch was started after two years. Under the name Salon de Rencontre Belle Boudoir, a complete experience world/experience was created. Tilley wanted to offer party and bridal wear, jewelry, the children's collection, lighting and furniture at an exclusive room level. In the salons, a permanent collection was for sale, with new creations added every month that were organized thematically. The clothing was handmade and could be made to measure.

== Death and legacy ==
Tilley died unexpectedly on 22 June 2012 of pneumonia by pneumococcus. Her funeral took place on 28 June in an intimate setting at her estate in Asbeek. Before her death, she still had several ongoing projects. For example, she designed the uniforms for the cabin crew of Thomas Cook Airlines Belgium and there was the collection for the clothing chain JBC. In addition, she was still working on the costume design for the musical Peter Pan. The designs were further completed by her daughters Rebekka and Epiphany.

In September 2012, the two daughters organised a sale of collection and archive items as a farewell. They also took over the fashion company and created, among other things, the prêt-à-porter collections Heaven in 2013 and Earth in 2014. The Heaven collection was made in the style and atmosphere of Kaat Tilley. With this, the daughters wanted to show that the Kaat Tilley label would continue to exist. The Earth collection of 2014 showed the vision and the personal perspective of the two daughters on the label.

In 2014, the non-profit organization Het Forum van Vlaamse vrouwen organized the overview exhibition “Tussen Hemel en Aarde” around Kaat Tilley. This took place in the Augustinian monastery in Ghent. With this, her daughters wanted to pay tribute to their deceased mother. Fashion creations, paintings, sculptures and sketchbooks were shown at the exhibition.

In 2017, Rebekka and Epiphany decided to put the fashion brand on hold to go their own way. In connection with this, their mother's domain in Asbeek was also sold.
