= Thomas Adolphus Trollope =

English writer (1810–1892)

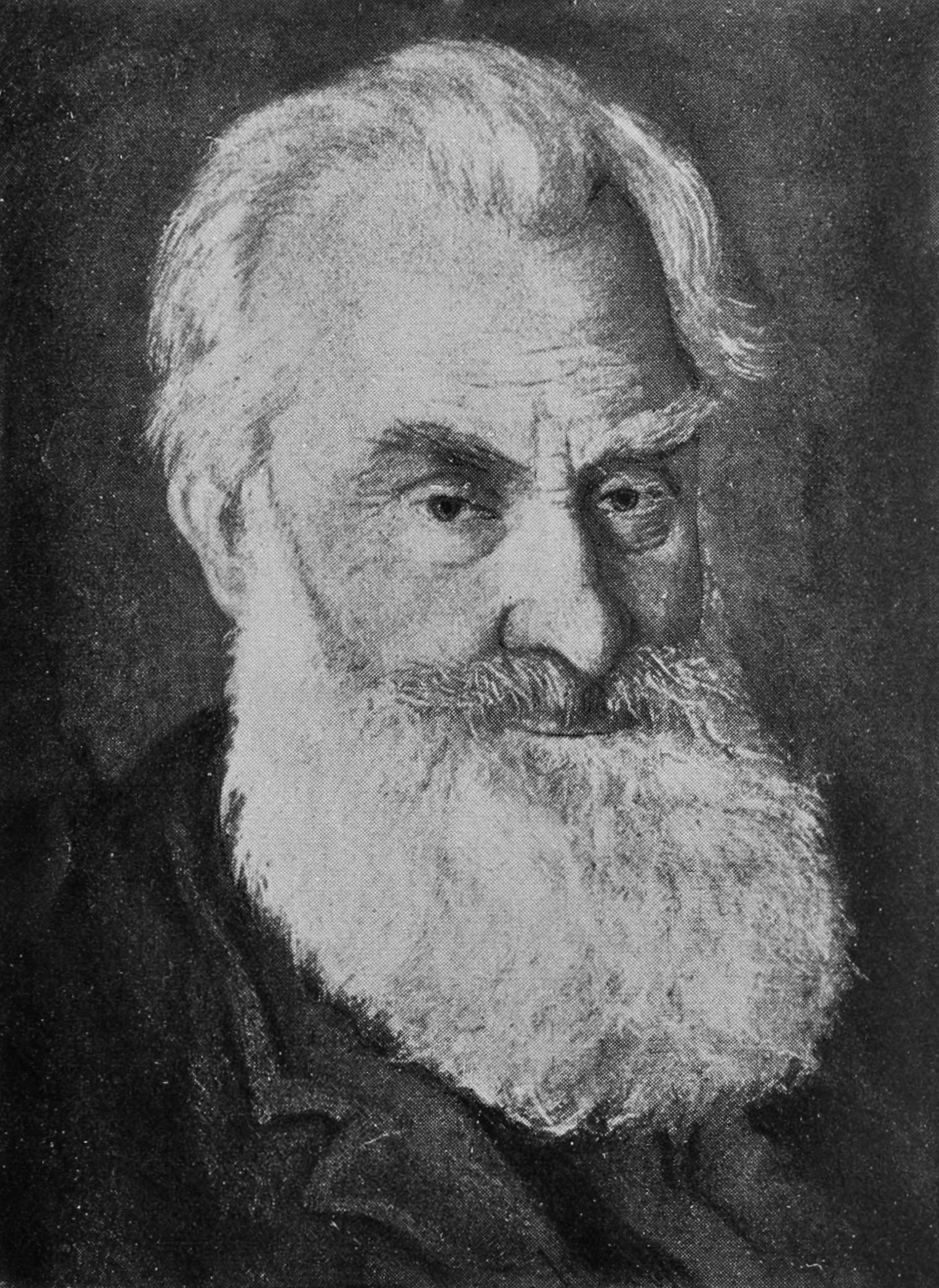
- Thomas Adolphus Trollope (from a painting by Maria Taylor)
- Born: 29 April 1810; Bloomsbury, London, England
- Died: 11 November 1892 (aged 82); Clifton, Bristol, England
- Occupation: Writer
- Spouses: Theodosia Garrow (m. 1848) Frances Eleanor Trollope (m. 1866)
- Parents: Thomas Anthony Trollope (father); Frances Milton Trollope (mother)
- Relatives: Anthony Trollope (brother); Cecilia Tilley (sister)

Thomas Adolphus Trollope (29 April 1810 – 11 November 1892) was an English writer who was the author of more than 60 books. He lived most of his life in Italy creating a renowned villa in Florence with his first wife, Theodosia, and later another centre of British society in Rome with his second wife, the novelist Frances Eleanor Trollope. His mother, brother and both wives were known as writers. He was awarded the Order of Saints Maurice and Lazarus by Victor Emmanuel II of Italy.

== Life ==
Trollope was born in Bloomsbury, London on 29 April 1810, the eldest son of Thomas Anthony and Frances Milton Trollope. (A younger brother was Anthony Trollope, the novelist.) He was educated at Harrow School and Winchester College. He first started writing before he went to Oxford University after a trip to New York with his father. He matriculated at St Alban Hall, Oxford, in 1829, aged 19, and graduated B.A. from Magdalen Hall, Oxford, in 1835. He taught briefly at Birmingham's King Edward's Grammar School, before he gave in to his mother's idea of forming a writing partnership. They travelled to Italy, which gave rise to some of the material for the 60 volumes of travel writing, history and fiction that he wrote that decade. This was in addition to a large amount of periodical and journalistic work.

Trollope married twice: his first wife was the writer Theodosia Garrow who was staying with his mother, Fanny Trollope, in Florence. The newly married couple had one daughter, Beatrice. Their home was visited by travelling British intelligentsia as well as by leading Italian nationalist figures. They lived at the Villino Trollope on the square that was then called the Piazza Maria Antonio, now the Piazza dell'Indipendenza, in Florence. Their house was decorated with carved furniture, inlaid walls, majolica ceramics, marble floors and pillars, suits of armour and a 5,000-book library.

Their new villa was bought in part with Theodosia's inheritance. Their house was considered the centre of the expatriate society in Florence. Theodosia was known for her poetry, her translations and her articles on household matters, and she also contributed letters to the Athenaeum advocating freedom for Italy.

The Trollopes' daughter played with Pen, the son of Robert and Elizabeth Browning, when they too became part of the Anglophone society in 1847. Comparisons of the two households showed the Browning household as more intense, with the Trollopes more carefree. All of her guests were in danger of appearing, in some disguised way, in his mother's novels.

His second wife was the novelist Frances Eleanor Ternan, whom he married on 29 October 1866: they then lived at the Villa Ricorboli. From 1873 the new couple again created a house known for its hospitality, but this time in Rome. Trollope lived in Italy for most of his adult life, but retired to Devon, England, in 1890. He died at Clifton, near Bristol, on 11 November 1892. His memoirs, What I Remember, were published in three volumes between 1887 (vols. 1 & 2) and 1889 (vol. 3).

== Selected works ==
- A Summer in Brittany (1840) edited by Frances Milton Trollope
- A Summer in Western France (1841) edited by Frances Milton Trollope
- Impressions of a Wanderer in Italy, Switzerland, France and Spain (1850)
- The Girlhood of Catherine De' Medici (1856)
- A Decade of Italian Women (1859)
- Life of Vittoria Colonna (1859)
- Filippo Strozzi; a History of the Last Days of the Old Italian Liberty (1860)
- La Beata; A Tuscan Romeo & Juliet (1861)
- Paul the Pope and Paul the Friar. A Story of an Interdict (1861)
- Marietta (1862)
- A Lenten Journey in Umbria and the Marches (1862)
- Giulio Malatesta (1863)
- Beppo the Conscript (1864)
- Lindisfarn Chase (1864)
- A History of the Commonwealth of Florence (1865)
- Gemma (1866)
- Artingale Castle (1867)
- The Dream Numbers (1868)
- Leonora Casaloni; or, the Secret Marriage (1868)
- The Garstangs of Garstang Grange (1869)
- The Sealed Packet (1870)
- A Siren (1870)
- Durnton Abbey (1871)
- The Stilwinches of Combe Mavis (1872)
- Diamond Cut Diamond. A Story of Tuscan Life; and other stories (1874)
- The Papal Conclaves; As They Were and As They Are (1876)
- The Story of the Life of Pius the Ninth (1877)
- A Peep Behind the Scenes at Rome (1877)
- A Family Party in the Piazza of St. Peter; and other stories (1877)
- Italy from the Alps to Mount Etna (1877) editor; translated by Frances Eleanor Trollope
- The Homes and Haunts of the Italian Poets (1881) with Frances Eleanor Trollope
- On the Rhine, and other Sketches of European Travel (1881) contributor
- What I Remember (1887)
- Further Reminiscences (1889)
