= John Tilley (civil servant) =

English civil servant (1813–1898)

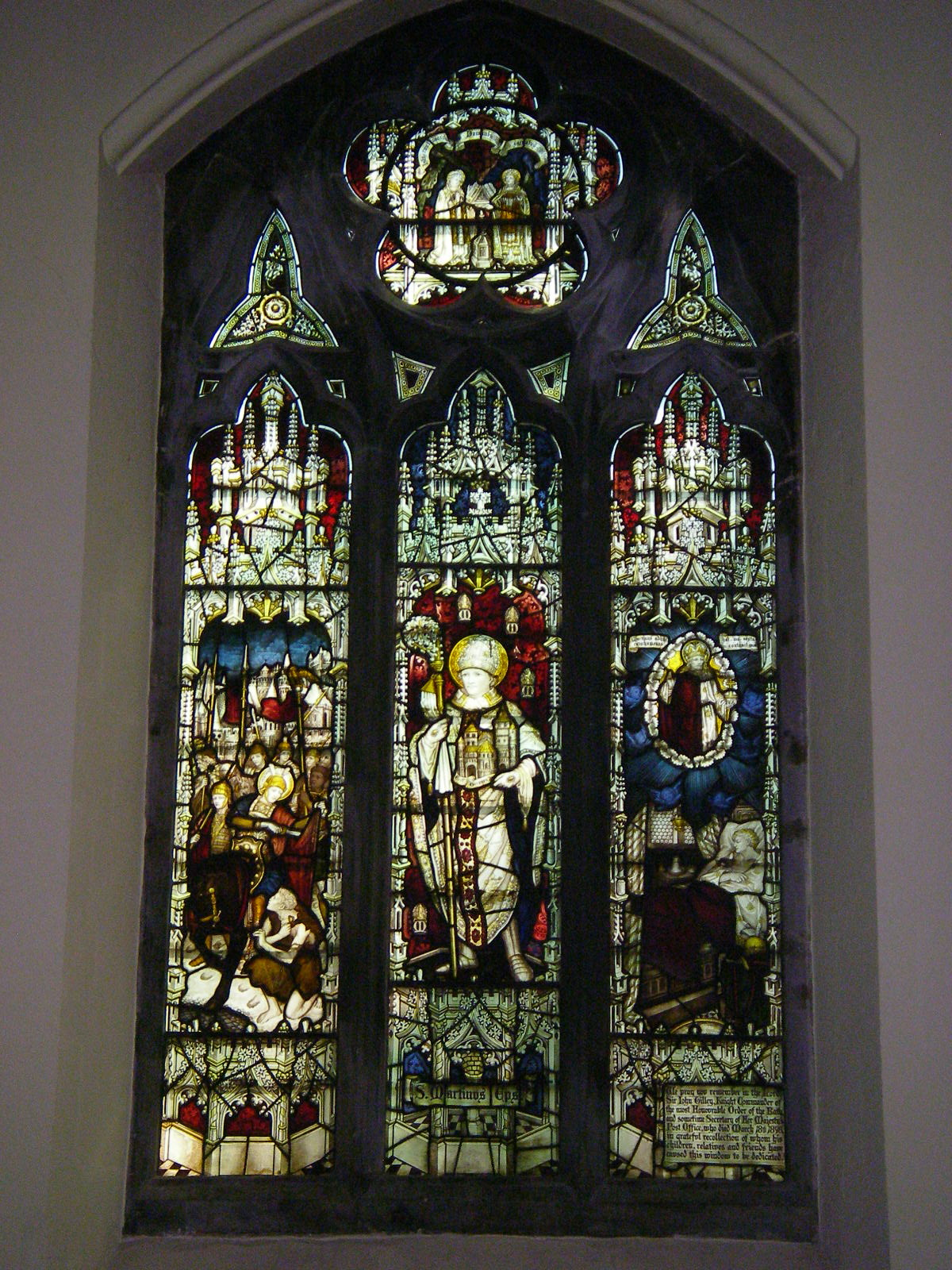
The Sir John Tilley stained glass window in St Saviour, Pimlico

Sir John Tilley KCB (20 January 1813 – 18 March 1898) was Secretary to the General Post Office of the United Kingdom.

== Early life and family ==
Tilley's father had died before he was born. His mother was Elizabeth Fraser, daughter of Thomas Fraser of Lane Son & Fraser (sometimes spelt 'Frazer'). He was educated privately at Bromley, Kent.

== Career ==
Tilley entered the service of the General Post Office on 11 February 1829 as a clerk in the Secretary's Office in Lombard Street, London, having been nominated by a friend of his mother, the then Secretary, Francis Freeling, and appointed to the Secretary's office by the Postmaster General, the Duke of Manchester.

He remained with the Post Office throughout his working life, rising from clerk to Secretary, the position he held on his retirement at the age of sixty-seven in 1880.

In 1838, at the relatively young age of 27, and after only ten years with the Post Office, Tilley was appointed Surveyor of the Northern District of England on the nomination of the then Secretary of the Post Office, Colonel Maberly, while the Appointment Books show that he was formally appointed on 25 October 1838 by the Postmaster General, the Earl of Lichfield.

Tilley spent ten years as Surveyor of the Northern District of England, moving to Lytham (now known as Lytham St. Annes), Lancashire where he organised the distribution of mail until on 29 September 1848 he was promoted to the position of Assistant Secretary of the Post Office. Tilley's wife Cecilia was at that time suffering from consumption, and brief mention is made of the sad family circumstances Tilley was experiencing at this time, which made him happy to return to London.

Despite this, Tilley was involved in the organisation of The Great Exhibition held in Hyde Park, London in 1851.

In 1854 a Commission of Enquiry into the establishment of the Post Office was set up which brought about a number of changes in the London establishment. The Postmaster General of the day, Lord Canning, sent Tilley to Edinburgh and Dublin to revise the establishments there. Tilley is credited with having ensured that the clerks, sorters and postmen received better pay.

Tilley had been a great supporter of the Savings Bank Act (1861). This enabled the Post Office to offer savings accounts to less wealthy citizens with more security than banks could offer, resulting in the present-day National Savings and Investments.

In 1864, when Sir Rowland Hill vacated the position of Secretary of the Post Office, Tilley was appointed to succeed him. However, this appears to be contradicted by the existence of a letter dated 8 August 1860 which suggests that Tilley had been appointed Secretary earlier.

Throughout Tilley's time at the Post Office, his close friendship with his brother-in-law, Anthony Trollope, continued. In 1888, Trollope described Tilley as one of his "oldest and dearest friends".

On 16 April 1880, at the age of 67, Tilley retired from the Post Office. He was described by a colleague, Edmund Yates, in his Recollections and Experiences as a "shrewd, caustic and clever man, bred in the Post Office service and knowing it thoroughly; by no means a crocheteer, but with his public office experience, tempered by plenty of worldly knowledge, and as unimpressionable as an oyster" Further description of his "remarkable" personality is given by one of Tilley's oldest official friends, but unidentified by name, who described him as "a hard man in official relations, yet genial. He was truthful, courageous and unaffected, generally a sound judge of character, and always ready to admit and correct a mistake. He was clear sighted, just and absolutely fearless, with a strong sense of duty; always wanting to do right."

== Charitable and public work ==
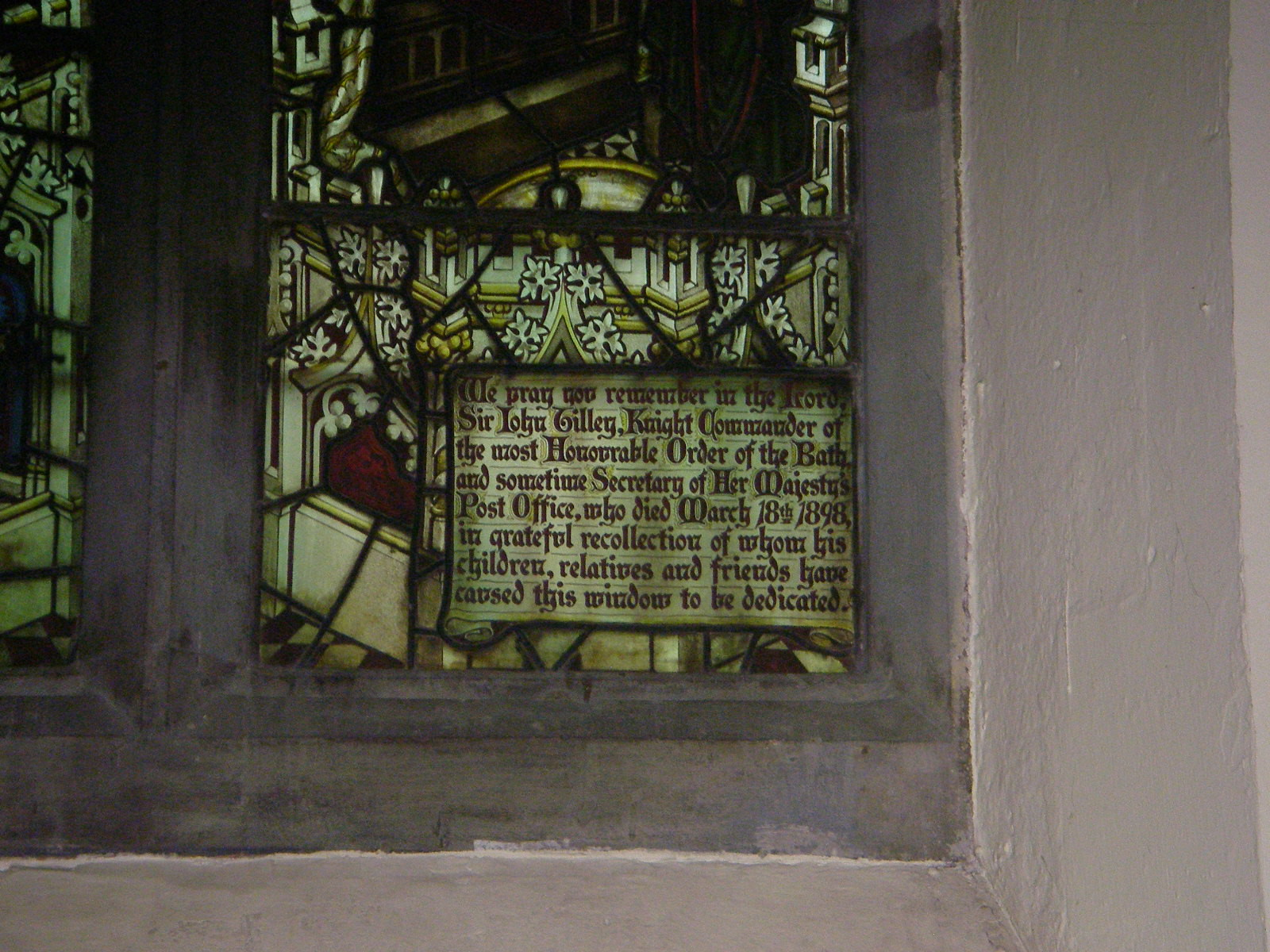
Sir John Tilley dedication in St Saviour, Pimlico

Having retired from the Post Office, Tilley did not retire from public life. For fifteen years he was a member of the Board of Guardians of St George's, Hanover Square, of which he became vice-chairman and later chairman. He also chaired the Relief Committee, engaged in the distribution of outdoor relief to the deserving poor, and the Fulham Road Workhouse Committee, responsible for the care and conduct of one of the largest workhouses in the country.

He was a Manager and member of the finance committee of the Metropolitan Asylums Board, a Manager of the West London Schools, and in 1891 Chairman of the Eastern Hospital, during an Inquiry into maladministration at the hospital.

He was also Treasurer of the Metropolitan Convalescent Institution, in which he took a special interest, and was also a Justice of the Peace for London and Middlesex.

In January 1889, Tilley was nominated to the first London County Council.

For many years, he was one of the churchwardens of St Saviour, Pimlico, in St George's Square, while the Rev. Henry Washington was vicar. There, on 18 December 1898, a window was dedicated in his memory.

== Marriages and children ==
On 4 February 1839 Tilley married Cecilia Frances Trollope at St Mary's, Bryanston Square. Marriage record in parish register of St Mary's Church, Bryanstone Square She was the daughter of Thomas Anthony Trollope and of Frances Trollope and the sister of Anthony Trollope.

They had five children, of whom only one survived to adulthood.

1. Frances Trollope Tilley (1839–1851)
2. Cecilia Isabel Tilley (1840–1850)
3. Ann Jane Tilley (1842–1850)
4. Arthur William Tilley (1845–1850)
5. Edith Diane Mary Tilley (1846–1925)

John and Cecilia Tilley lived for a number of years at Carlton Hill, Penrith, having purchased the property from Cecilia's mother. When they returned to London in 1848, they lived at Allen Place where Cecilia Tilley died on 4 April 1849.

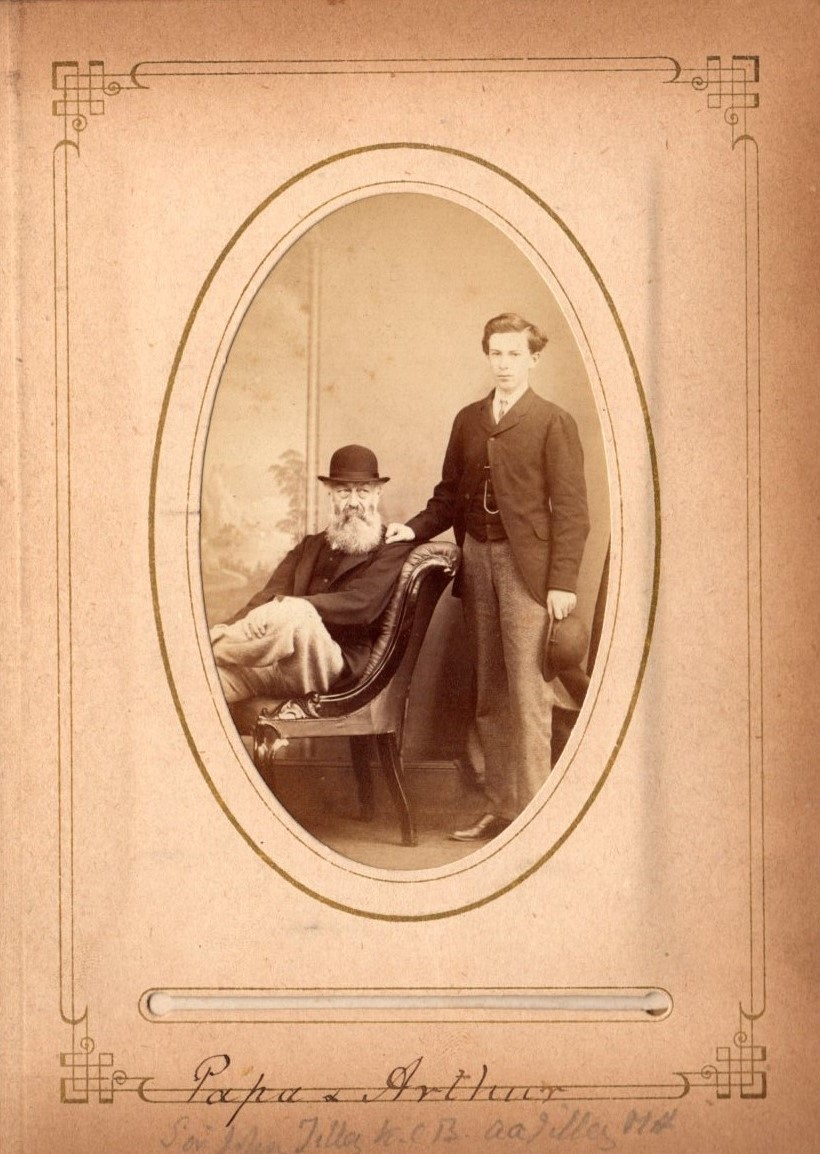
Sir John Tilley & Arthur Augustus Tilley

On 18 May 1850, Tilley married secondly, at Kensington, Mary Anne Partington, the daughter of Thomas Partington and of Penelope Ann Trollope, so a first cousin of Cecilia Frances Trollope. They had one child, Arthur Augustus Tilley (1851–1942), a Classical scholar who became a lecturer in Roman History at King's College, Cambridge, and a historian.

Mary Anne Tilley died 3 weeks after the birth of their son in 1851, and on 7 February 1861 Tilley married thirdly Susannah Anderson Montgomerie, the daughter of William Eglinton Montgomerie of Annick Lodge and Greenville, Ayrshire, by his marriage to Susanna Fraser Anderson, and a granddaughter of Alexander Montgomerie. in Kilmarnock, Ayrshire. They had three children:

- Cecilia Montgomerie Tilley (1862–1868)
- William George Tilley (1863 – 28 June 1887)
- John Anthony Cecil Tilley (1869–1952), who joined the Foreign Office and became British Ambassador to Brazil and later Japan.

Dame Susannah Anderson Tilley

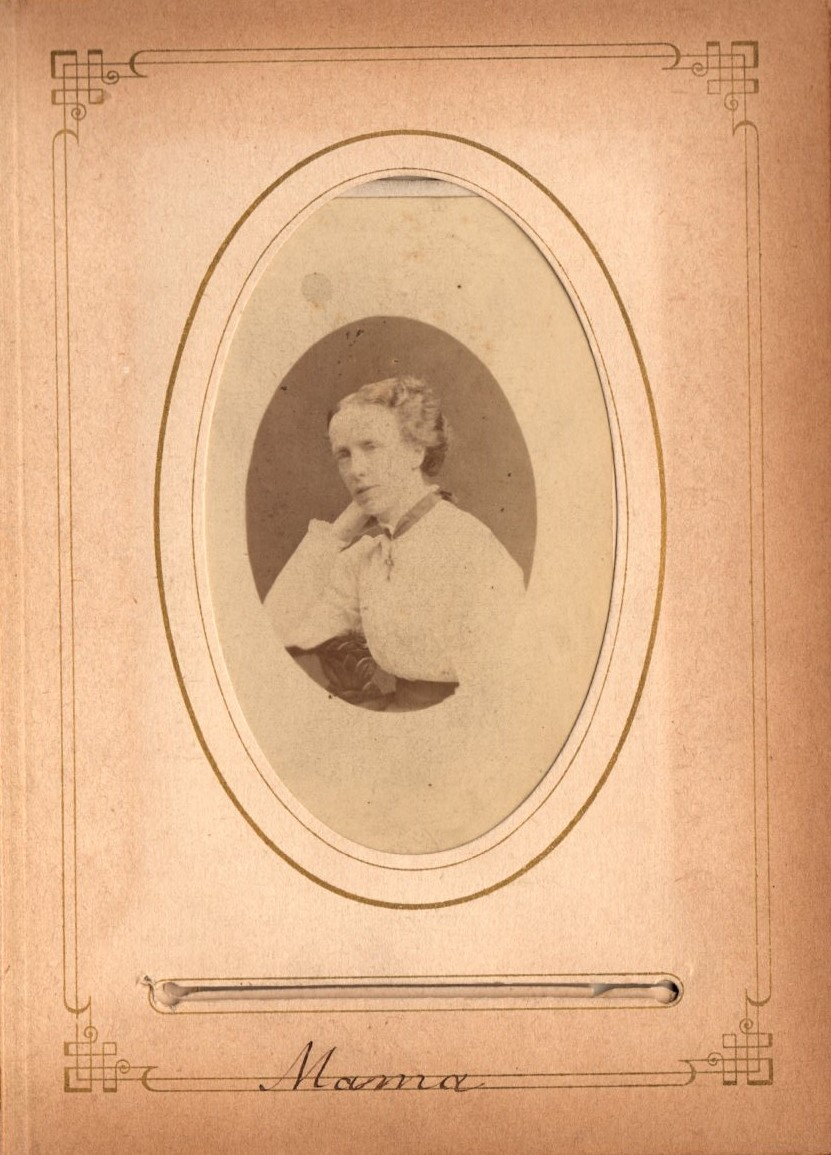
Susannah Anderson Tilley nee Montgomerie

died on 4 March 1880.

== Death ==
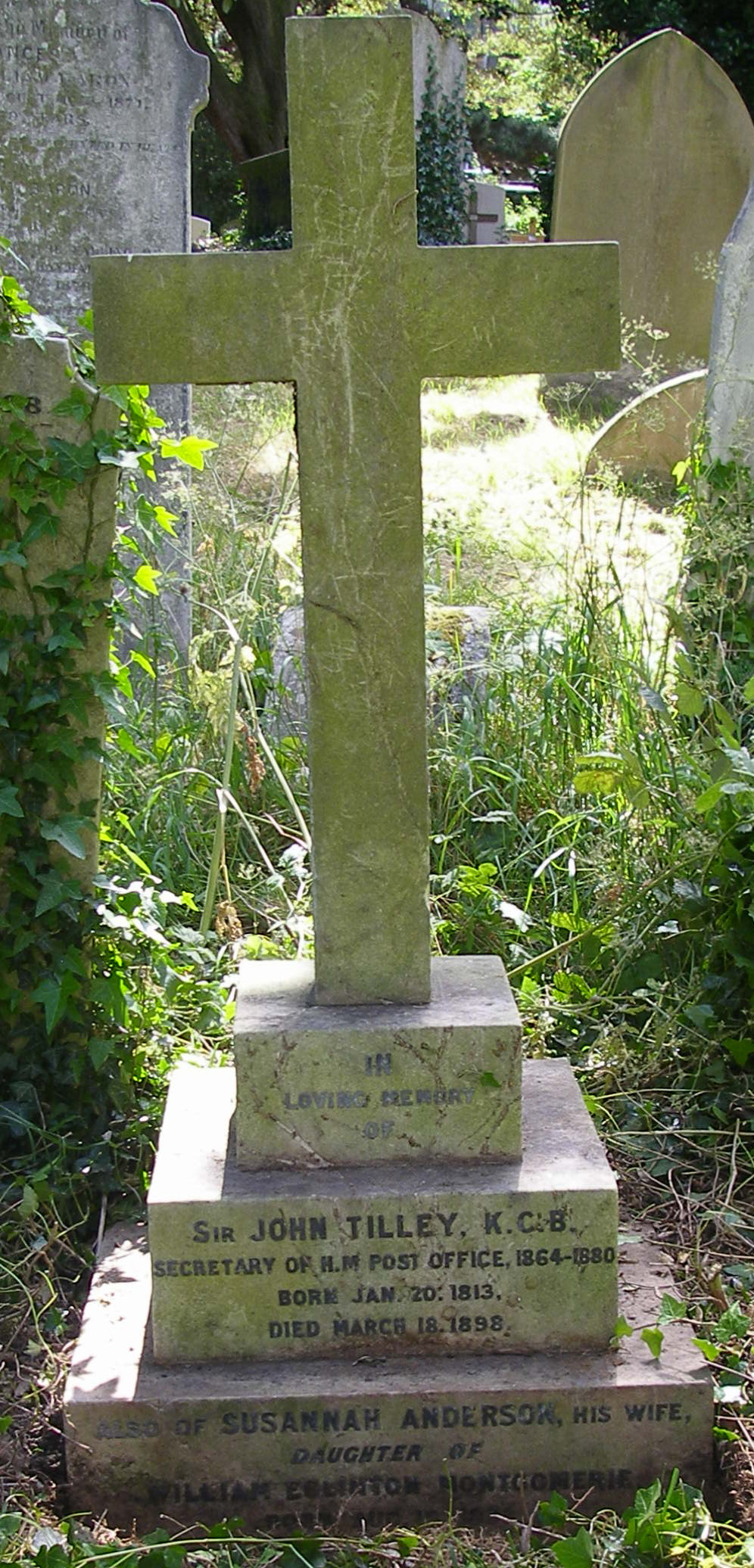
Tilley's gravestone in Brompton Cemetery

After a long illness, Tilley died on 18 March 1898 at his home, 73 St George's Square, London, where he had lived since 1856. He is buried in Brompton Cemetery, near Earl's Court in South West London, with his third wife, Susannah.

== Honours ==
- 1871: Companion of the Order of the Bath
- 1880: Knight Commander of the Order of the Bath
